= Ludwigs Corner, Pennsylvania =

Unincorporated community in Pennsylvania, US

- Unincorporated community
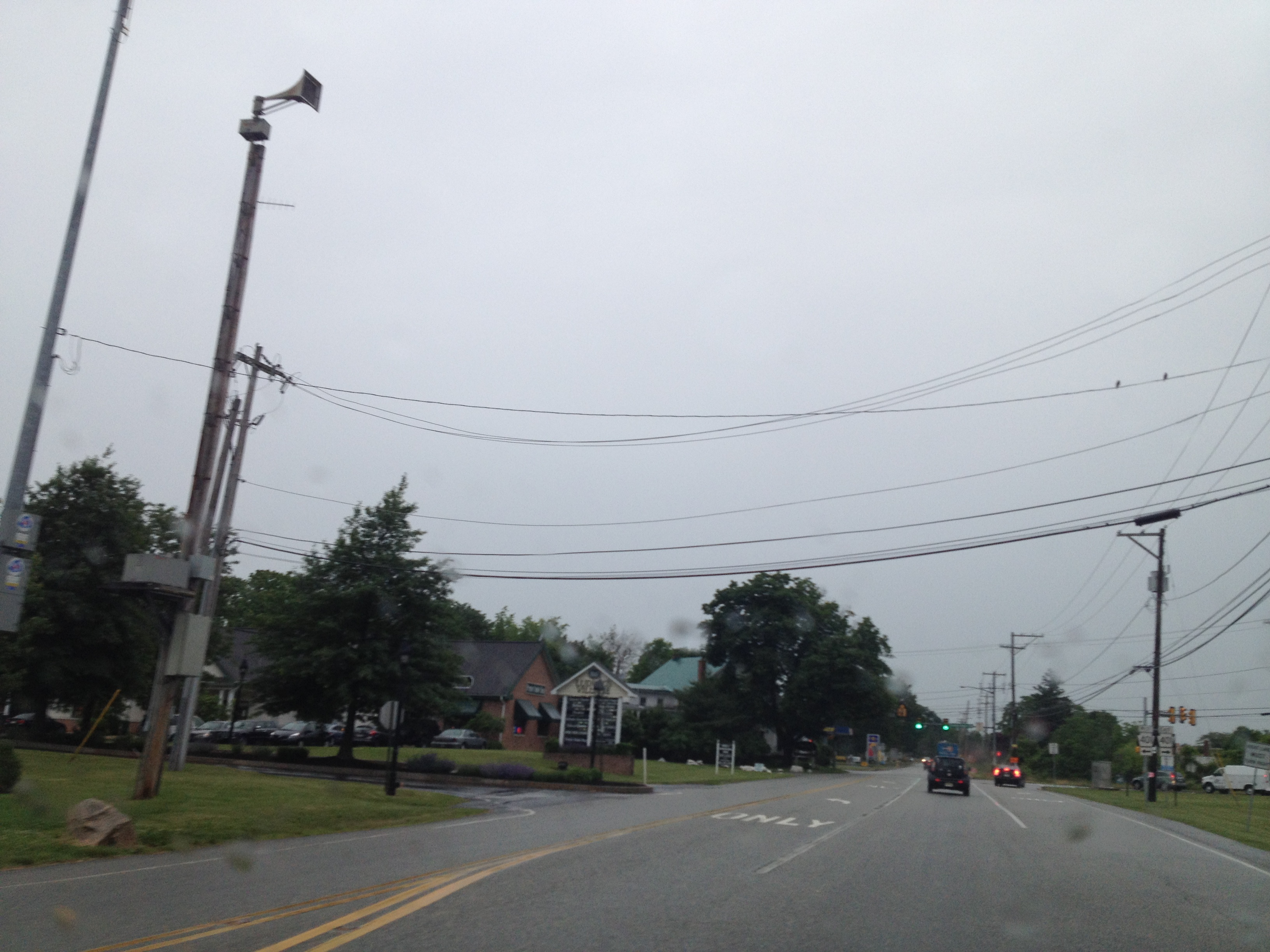
- Ludwigs Corner lies the intersection of PA Route 100 and PA Route 401 in Chester County, Pennsylvania.

- Location of Ludwigs Corner in Pennsylvania Ludwigs Corner (the United States)
- Coordinates: 40°06′56″N 75°41′38″W
- Country: United States
- State: Pennsylvania
- County: Chester
- Township: West Vincent
- Elevation: 627 ft (191 m)
- Time zone: UTC-5 (EST)
  - Summer (DST): UTC-4 (EDT)
- Area code: 610

Ludwigs Corner is an unincorporated village located in West Vincent Township, Pennsylvania, United States. It is four miles north of Eagle.

== Geography ==
Ludwigs Corner is a community in Chester County, Pennsylvania, located at latitude 40.116 and longitude -75.694 with an elevation of 627 feet.

== Transportation ==
Ludwigs Corner is located at the junction of PA Route 100 and PA Route 401.

Pennsylvania Route 401 is also known as Conestoga Road. In the colonial era, this route was known as the Conestoga Turnpike and was a main path of travel between Philadelphia and western towns such as Lancaster. Many of the wagons were of a flat but arched design that would float when fording creeks and rivers with high water. They were known as Conestoga wagons.

== History ==
Ludwigs Corner is the home of St. Andrews Episcopal Church, organized in 1832. Within the walled cemetery is the grave of Owen Josephus Roberts, United States Supreme Court Justice from 1930 - 1945.

Ludwigs Corner is known for being the host of the annual Ludwig's Corner Horse Show & Country Fair held over Labor Day Weekend.

The village is named after early settler Hannah Ludwig
