= Pennsylvania Route 401 =

State highway in Pennsylvania, US

Pennsylvania Route 401
- Conestoga Road
- PA 401 in red and PA 401 Truck in blue

Route information
- Maintained by PennDOT
- Length: 20.175 mi (32.469 km)

Major junctions
- West end: PA 23 near Elverson
- PA 82 in Elverson; PA 345 in East Nantmeal Township; PA 100 in West Vincent Township; PA 113 in West Pikeland Township; US 202 in East Whiteland Township
- East end: US 30 in East Whiteland Township

Location
- Country: United States
- State: Pennsylvania
- Counties: Berks, Chester

Highway system
- Pennsylvania State Route System; Interstate; US; State; Scenic; Legislative
← PA 399	→ PA 402

Pennsylvania Route 401 (PA 401) is a 20.2-mile-long (32.5 km) east–west state route in Berks and Chester counties, located in southeast Pennsylvania. The western terminus is at PA 23 in Caernarvon Township, across the county line from Elverson. The eastern terminus is at U.S. Route 30 (US 30) in East Whiteland Township, a short distance west of Malvern. PA 401 is called Conestoga Road its entire length and runs through rural areas with suburban development toward the eastern part of the route. PA 401 follows a former turnpike chartered in 1809 known as the Little Conestoga Turnpike. PA 401 was designated along Conestoga Road between PA 29 (Phoenixville Pike) and US 30/PA 1 in 1928. The route was extended west to PA 23 in the 1930s, at which time the entire length was paved.

== Route description ==
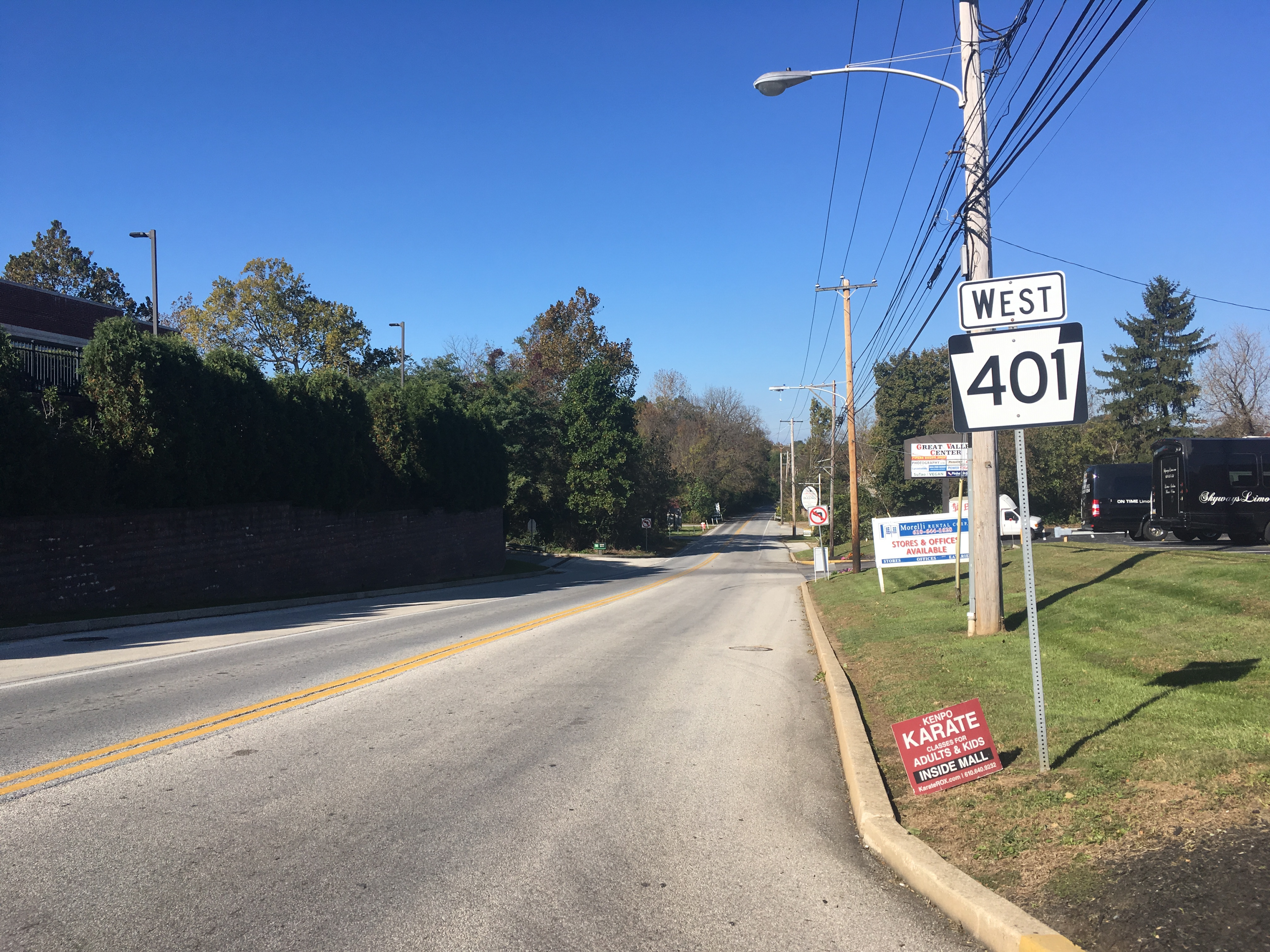
PA 401 westbound past its eastern terminus at US 30 in East Whiteland Township

PA 401 begins at an intersection with PA 23 in Caernarvon Township, Berks County, heading southeast on two-lane undivided Conestoga Road. The route heads into agricultural areas as it crosses into the borough of Elverson in Chester County, where it runs between farmland to the north and rural areas of woods and homes to the south, crossing PA 82. After this junction, the road runs between housing developments to the north and rural areas to the south, crossing into West Nantmeal Township. PA 401 continues into forested areas with some farm fields as it enters East Nantmeal Township and comes to the PA 345 intersection. At this point, the route continues southeast through more woods before heading into farmland and turning south. The road crosses into forests and turns sharply to the east, entering areas of farms with a few residences. Farther east, PA 401 heads into more wooded areas of homes as it crosses into West Vincent Township and reaches the PA 100 junction.

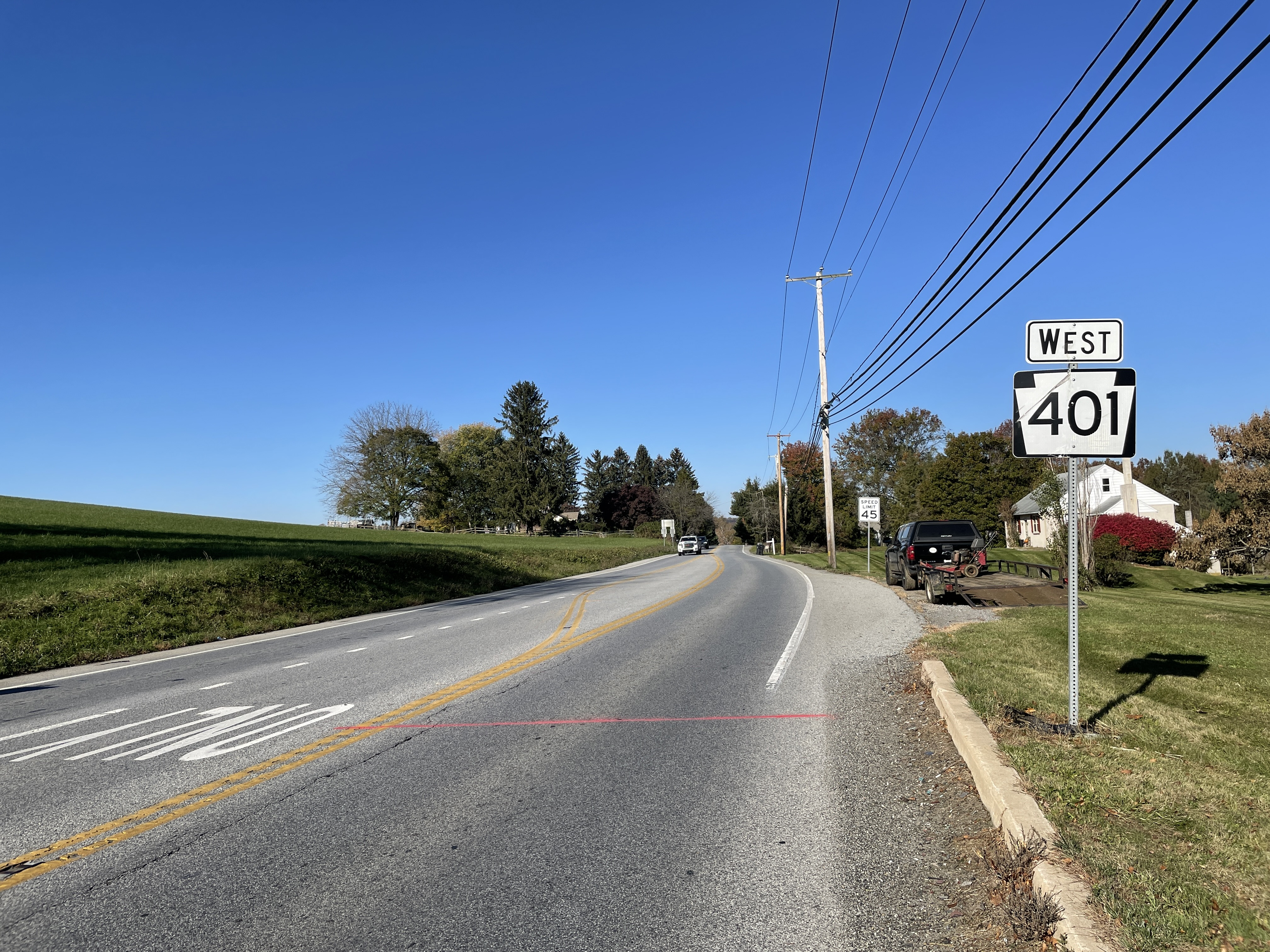
PA 401 westbound past PA 113 in West Pikeland Township

The route continues southeast past a mix of farms, woods, and housing developments, briefly crossing into Upper Uwchlan Township before heading back into West Vincent Township. The road curves south before continuing southeast into West Pikeland Township, where it crosses Pickering Creek before intersecting PA 113. Past this intersection, PA 401 passes through wooded areas of residential development, passing under the Pennsylvania Turnpike (Interstate 76). A short distance later, the route comes into Charlestown Township and passes more forested areas of homes before turning east into East Whiteland Township. The route runs past more housing developments and crosses Valley Creek before it widens to four lanes at the Phoenixville Pike intersection and reaches a diamond interchange with the US 202 freeway, where it is briefly a divided highway. The route narrows back to a two-lane undivided road past this interchange and crosses the Chester Valley Trail before continuing southeast to the eastern terminus at US 30 (Lancaster Avenue) in Frazer.

== History ==
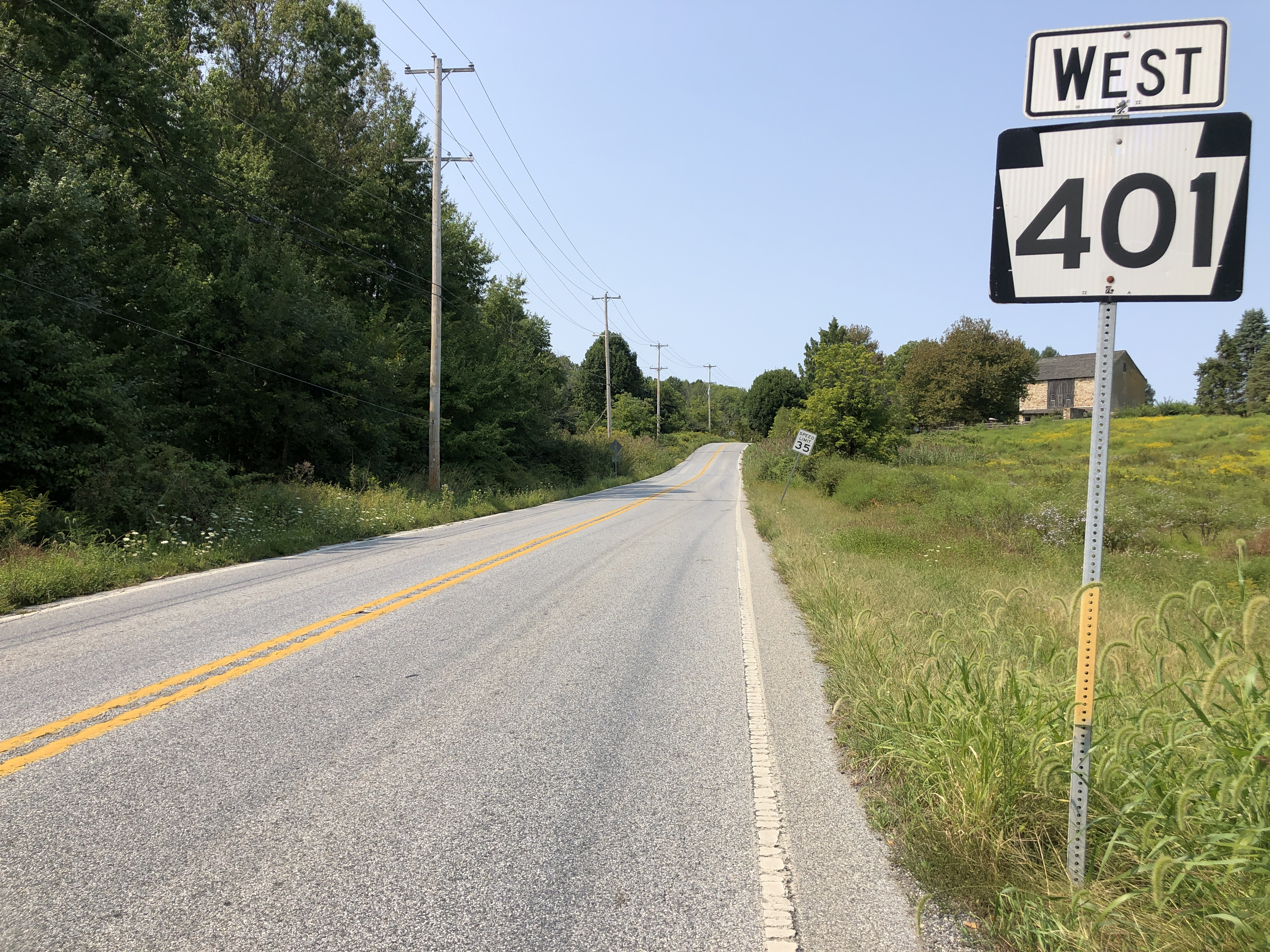
PA 401 westbound in Upper Uwchlan Township

A turnpike called the Little Conestoga Turnpike was chartered on March 16, 1809 to run from the Philadelphia and Lancaster Turnpike near the Warren Tavern in Malvern northwest toward Berks County, where it intersected a junction between roads leading to Morgantown and Reading. When Pennsylvania first legislated routes in 1911, the current route of PA 401 was not legislated as a route. PA 401 was designated in 1928 to run along Conestoga Road between PA 29 (Phoenixville Pike) and US 30/PA 1 while the road west from PA 29 to PA 23 remained unnumbered. At this time, the entire length of Conestoga Road, including the part designated PA 401, was unpaved. During the 1930s, PA 401 was extended west along Conestoga Road from PA 29 to its current western terminus at PA 23. At this time, the entire length was paved. PA 401 has remained on the same alignment since.

== Major intersections ==
County	Location	mi	km	Destinations	Notes
Berks	Caernarvon Township	0.000	0.000	PA 23 – Morgantown, Elverson, Phoenixville	Western terminus
Chester	Elverson	0.748	1.204	PA 82 (South Chestnut Street / North Manor Road) – Elverson, Coatesville	
Chester	East Nantmeal Township	3.052	4.912	PA 345 – Warwick, Coatesville	
Chester	West Vincent Township	9.493	15.278	PA 100 (Pottstown Pike) – Pottstown, Lionville	
Chester	West Pikeland Township	13.776	22.170	PA 113 (Kimberton Road) – Phoenixville, Lionville	
Chester	East Whiteland Township	18.258	29.383	US 202 – King of Prussia, West Chester	Interchange
Chester	East Whiteland Township	20.175	32.469	US 30 (Lancaster Pike) – Paoli, Frazer	Eastern terminus
1.000 mi = 1.609 km; 1.000 km = 0.621 mi

== PA 401 Alternate Truck ==
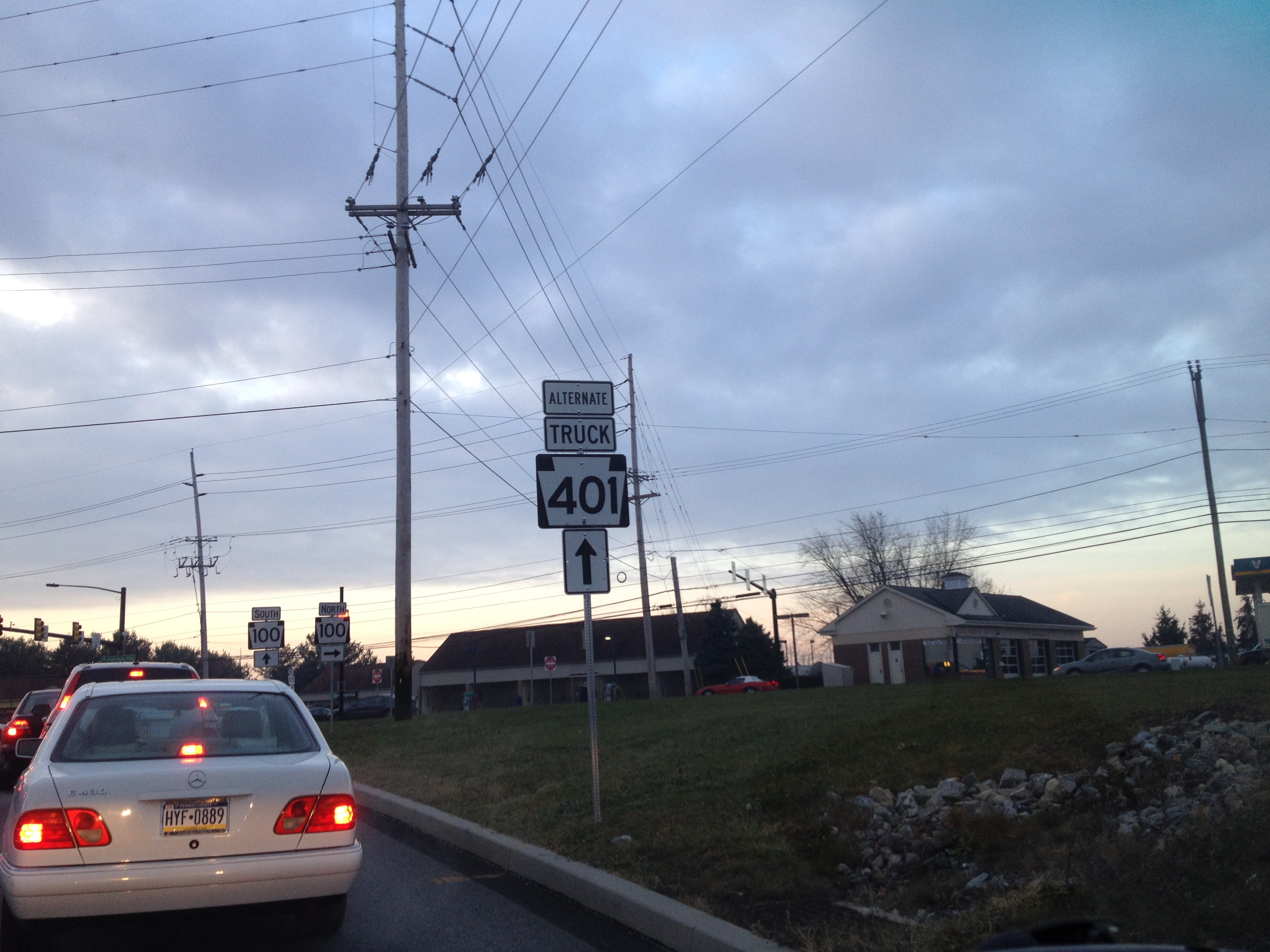
PA 401 Alternate Truck at intersection with PA 100 in Eagle.

PA Route 401 Alternate Truck
- Location: Upper Uwchlan, Pennsylvania
- Length: 6.2 mi (10.0 km)
- Existed: 2013–present

Pennsylvania Route 401 Alternate Truck is a truck route around a weight-restricted bridge over a branch of the Pickering Creek in West Pikeland Township, on which trucks over 32 tons and combination loads over 40 tons are prohibited. It was signed on November 1, 2013 and is routed on Byers Road, Graphite Mine Road, PA 100, and PA 113. It has an interchange the Pennsylvania Turnpike at exit 312, running concurrent with PA 100.
