= Pickering Creek =

Coordinates: 40.10654°N 75.59811°W

Pickering Creek is a 15.3-mile-long (24.6 km) tributary of the Schuylkill River in Chester County, Pennsylvania.

Pickering Creek's source is located in Upper Uwchlan Township, close to the intersection of Pottstown Pike (Pennsylvania Route 100) and Graphite Mine Road, near Eagle, Pennsylvania. It flows through West Pikeland Township, East Pikeland Township, Charlestown Township, and Schuylkill Township.

The creek's tributaries include Pine Creek and Pigeon Run. It is impounded to form the Pickering Creek Reservoir in Schuylkill Township, near the borough of Phoenixville, just above the creek's confluence with the Schuylkill River.

The Pickering Creek Trail follows the creek for part of its length. The Pickering Valley Railroad formerly ran in the valley as well.

== See also ==
- List of rivers of Pennsylvania
