= Heidelberg Township, Lehigh County, Pennsylvania =

Township in Pennsylvania, US

Heidelberg Township
- Township
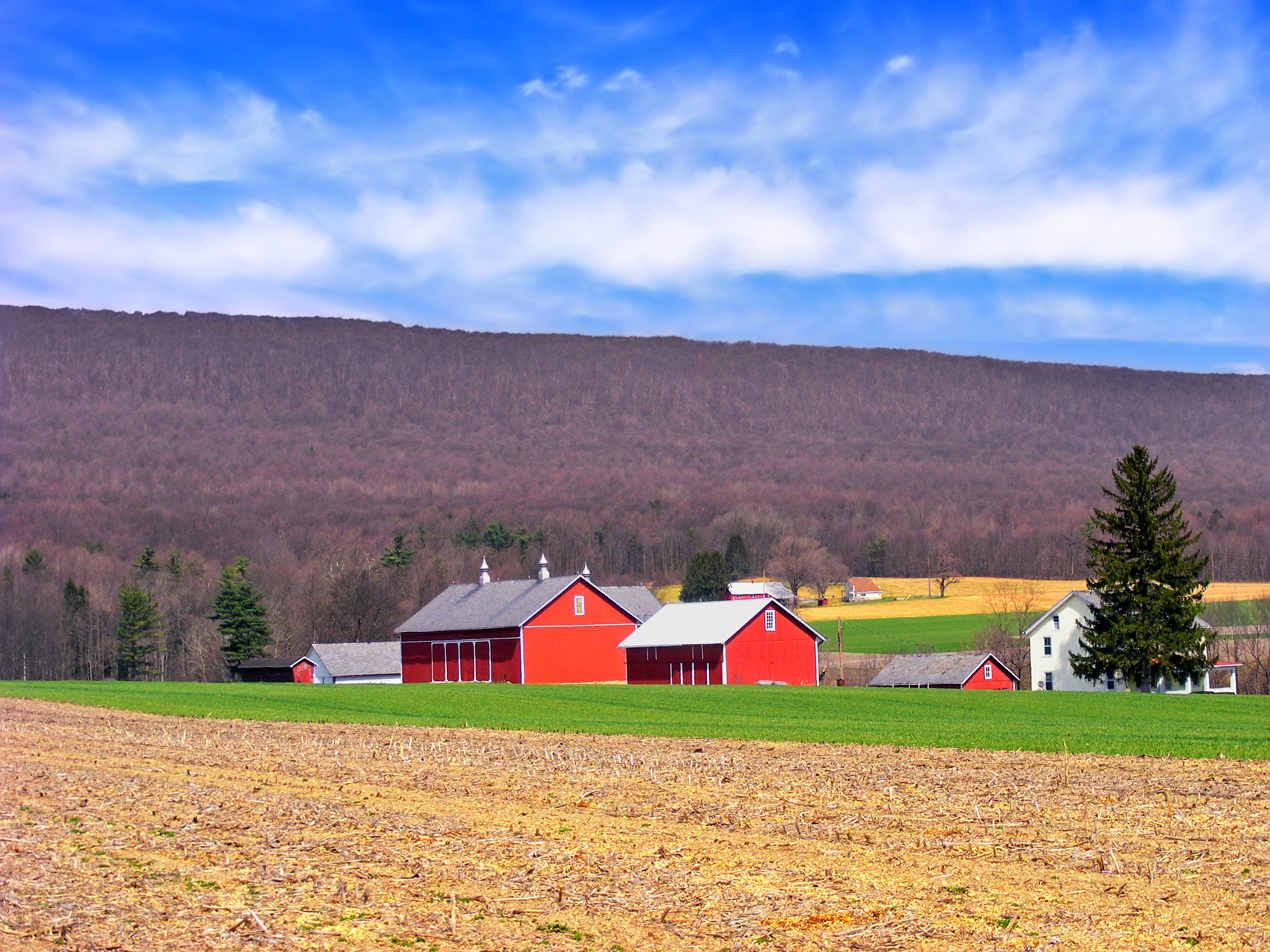
- A farm in Heidelberg Township in March 2010

- Seal

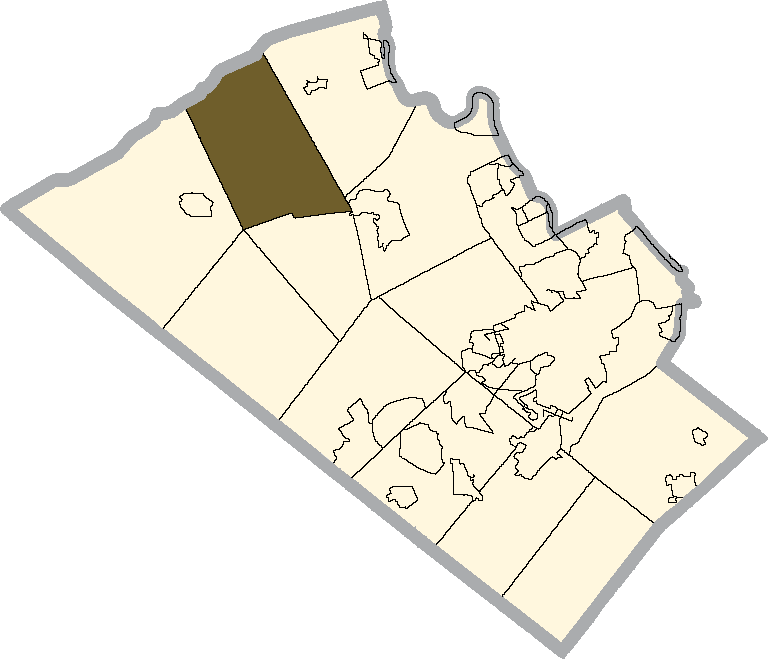
- Location of Heidelberg Township in Lehigh County, Pennsylvania

- Location in Pennsylvania Location in the United States
- Coordinates: 40°43′30″N 75°45′05″W
- Country: United States
- State: Pennsylvania
- County: Lehigh

Area
  - Township: 24.73 sq mi (64.05 km^{2})
  - Land: 24.64 sq mi (63.83 km^{2})
  - Water: 0.085 sq mi (0.22 km^{2})
- Elevation: 797 ft (243 m)

Population (2010)
  - Township: 3,416
  - Estimate (2016): 3,498
  - Density: 142/sq mi (54.8/km^{2})
  - Metro: 865,310 (US: 68th)
- Time zone: UTC-5 (EST)
  - Summer (DST): UTC-4 (EDT)
- Area code: 610
- FIPS code: 42-077-33616
- GNIS feature ID: 1216688
- Primary airport: Lehigh Valley International Airport
- Major hospital: Lehigh Valley Hospital–Cedar Crest
- School district: Northwestern Lehigh
- Website: www.heidelberglehigh.org

Heidelberg Township is a township in Lehigh County, Pennsylvania, United States. The population of Heidelberg Township was 3,416 at the 2010 census. It is a suburb of Allentown in the Lehigh Valley, which had a population of 861,899 and was the 68th-most populous metropolitan area in the U.S. as of the 2020 census.

== Geography ==
The township is located in northern Lehigh County, and Blue Mountain separates it from Carbon County to its north. The township's portion includes Bake Oven Knob, the highest elevated location in Lehigh County at 1,585 feet (483 m). Its villages include Diebertsville, Germans Corners, Germansville (both pronounced with a hard "g",) Jordan Valley, Lochland (also in Lynn Township), Pleasant Corners, and Saegersville.

According to the U.S. Census Bureau, Heidelberg Township has a total area of 24.7 square miles (64.1 km^{2}), of which 24.6 square miles (63.8 km^{2}) are land and 0.1 square miles (0.2 km^{2}), or 0.33%, are water. The township is located in the Delaware River watershed. Almost all of it drains into the Lehigh River (mainly by Jordan Creek which starts in Heidelberg), except for a very small area in the southwest portion that is drained by tributaries of Ontelaunee Creek leading to the Schuylkill River.

=== Adjacent municipalities ===
- Washington Township (east)
- North Whitehall Township (southeast)
- Lowhill Township (south)
- Weisenberg Township (tangent to the southwest)
- Lynn Township (west)
- West Penn Township (tangent to the northwest)
- East Penn Township (north)

=== Climate ===
The township has a humid continental climate (Dfa/Dfb) and the hardiness zones are 6a and 6b. Average monthly temperatures in Germansville range from 27.6 °F (−2.4 °C) in January to 72.4 °F (22.4 °C) in July.

== Transportation ==
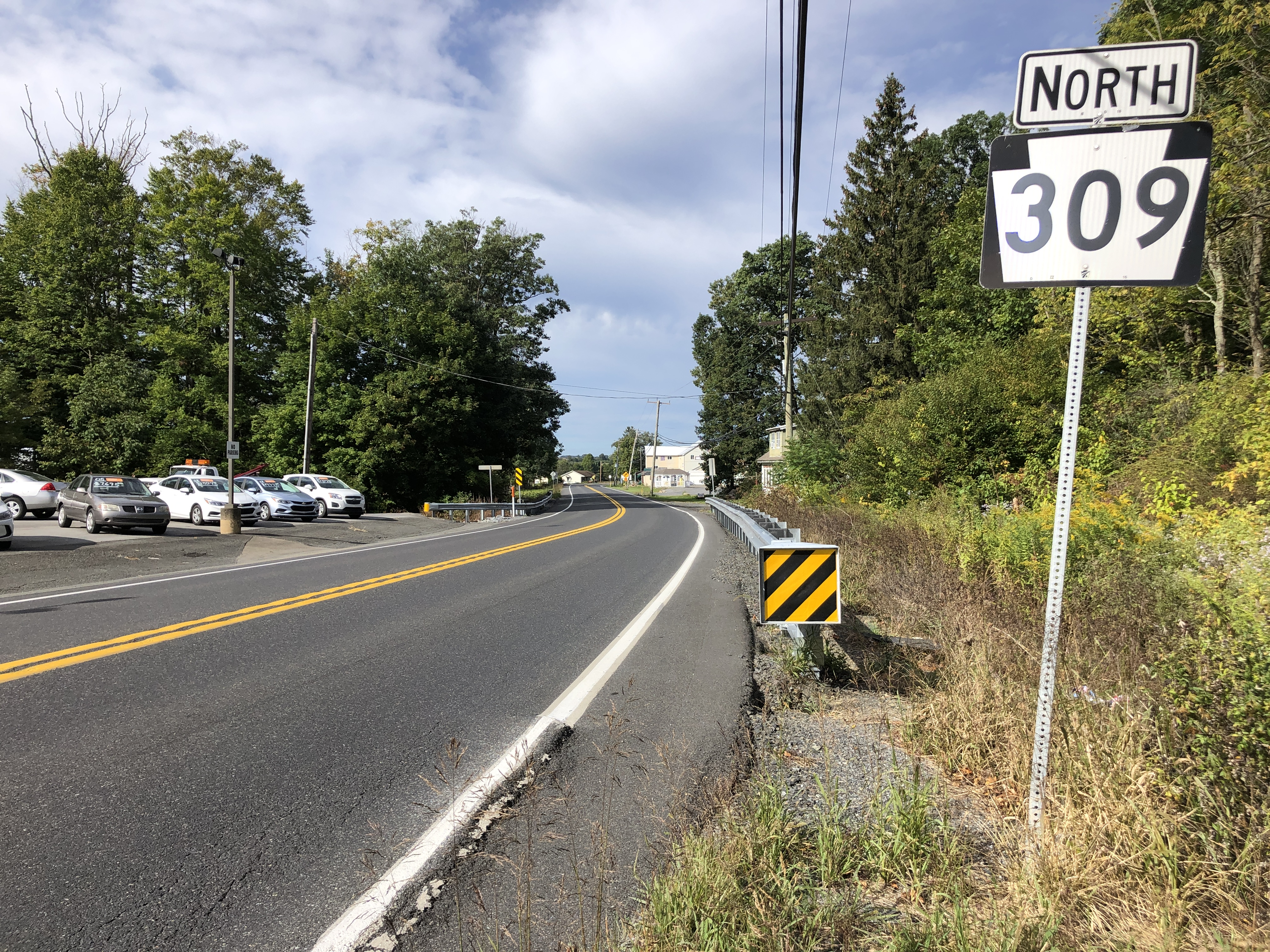
PA Route 309 North in Heidelberg Township

As of 2015, there were 83.18 miles (133.87 km) of public roads in Heidelberg Township, of which 35.32 miles (56.84 km) were maintained by the Pennsylvania Department of Transportation (PennDOT) and 47.86 miles (77.02 km) were maintained by the township.

Numbered routes in Heidelberg Township are Pennsylvania Route 100 and Pennsylvania Route 309. PA 100's northern terminus is on PA 309 at Pleasant Corners.

== Demographics ==
Historical population
Census	Pop.	Note	%±
2000	3,279		—
2010	3,416		4.2%
2016 (est.)	3,498		2.4%
U.S. Decennial Census

As of the 2000 census, there were 3,279 people, 1,187 households, and 943 families residing in the township. The population density was 132.7 inhabitants per square mile (51.2/km^{2}). There were 1,234 housing units at an average density of 50.0 per square mile (19.3/km^{2}). The racial makeup of the township was 98.69% White, 0.27% African American, 0.06% Native American, 0.30% Asian, 0.21% from other races, and 0.46% from two or more races. Hispanic or Latino of any race were 0.88% of the population.

There were 1,187 households, out of which 38.6% had children under the age of 18 living with them, 67.9% were married couples living together, 7.6% had a female householder with no husband present, and 20.5% were non-families. 15.2% of all households were made up of individuals, and 4.9% had someone living alone who was 65 years of age or older. The average household size was 2.76 and the average family size was 3.08.

In the township, the population was spread out, with 26.5% under the age of 18, 6.5% from 18 to 24, 32.0% from 25 to 44, 26.4% from 45 to 64, and 8.7% who were 65 years of age or older. The median age was 37 years. For every 100 females, there were 104.0 males. For every 100 females age 18 and over, there were 99.9 males. The median income for a household in the township was $55,030, and the median income for a family was $57,019. Males had a median income of $40,062 versus $29,205 for females. The per capita income for the township was $23,521. About 7.0% of families and 6.5% of the population were below the poverty line, including 6.2% of those under age 18 and 6.9% of those age 65 or over.

United States presidential election results for Heidelberg Township, Lehigh County, Pennsylvania
Year	Republican		Democratic		Third party(ies)	
Year	No.	%	No.	%	No.	%
2024	1,460	69.10%	640	30.29%	13	0.62%
2020	1,341	67.59%	621	31.30%	22	1.11%
2016	1,167	67.42%	492	28.42%	72	4.16%
2012	968	62.21%	563	36.18%	25	1.61%
2008	889	55.15%	699	43.36%	24	1.49%
2004	953	58.65%	653	40.18%	19	1.17%

== Public education ==
The township is served by the Northwestern Lehigh School District.
