= Pennsylvania Route 100 =

State highway in Pennsylvania, US

Pennsylvania Route 100

Route information
- Maintained by PennDOT
- Length: 59.409 mi (95.610 km)
- Existed: 1932–present

Major junctions
- South end: US 202 near West Chester
- US 30 in Exton; PA 113 in Lionville; I-76 Toll / Penna Turnpike near Lionville; PA 401 in Ludwigs Corner; PA 23 in Bucktown; US 422 near Pottstown; PA 73 in Gilbertsville; PA 29 from Hereford to Shimerville; US 222 in Trexlertown; I-78 / US 22 in Fogelsville
- North end: PA 309 in Pleasant Corners

Location
- Country: United States
- State: Pennsylvania
- Counties: Chester, Montgomery, Berks, Lehigh

Highway system
- Pennsylvania State Route System; Interstate; US; State; Scenic; Legislative
← PA 99	→ PA 101
← US 62	PA 62	→ PA 63

Pennsylvania Route 100 (PA 100) is a 59.4-mile (95.6 km) long state highway in the U.S. state of Pennsylvania that runs from U.S. Route 202 (US 202) near West Chester north to PA 309 in Pleasant Corners. The route runs between the western suburbs of Philadelphia and the Lehigh Valley region of the state, serving Chester, Montgomery, Berks, and Lehigh counties. PA 100 intersects several important highways, including US 30 in Exton, the Pennsylvania Turnpike (I-76) near Lionville, US 422 near Pottstown, US 222 in Trexlertown, and I-78/US 22 in Fogelsville. Several sections of PA 100 are multi-lane divided highway with some interchanges, including between US 202 and the Pennsylvania Turnpike in Chester County between south of Pottstown and New Berlinville, and between Trexlertown and Fogelsville.

PA 100 was originally designated as PA 62 in 1927, running between the Delaware border south of Chadds Ford and US 309/PA 312 in Allentown. PA 62 was rerouted to reach its northern end at PA 29 (now PA 309) in Pleasant Corners a year later. A northern section of PA 62 was designated between PA 15 in Wilkes-Barre and US 106/PA 7 (now US 6) in Tunkhannock in 1927, being replaced with PA 92 a year later. In 1932, PA 62 was renumbered to PA 100 to avoid duplication with US 62. In the 1950s, the route was realigned between south of Bechtelsville and Bally. PA 100 was moved to its four-lane alignment between south of Pottstown and New Berlinville in the 1960s.

Between the 1950s and 1960s, the northern terminus was cut back to Fogelsville with US 309 replacing the route north of there. The section of the route between Exton and Lionville was widened between the 1950s and the 1970s. A freeway along the route in Chester County was proposed in the 1960s, with a short section built between PA 100 south of Exton and US 202 north of West Chester. The southern terminus of PA 100 was moved from Delaware Route 100 (DE 100) at the state line, and placed at the south end of the freeway connector to US 202, in 2003 in order to reduce through traffic in West Chester. PA 100 was rerouted to bypass Trexlertown in 2005. A bypass of Eagle called Graphite Mine Road was completed in 2009, but PA 100 remained on its original alignment after the bypass was built.

== Route description ==
=== Chester County ===
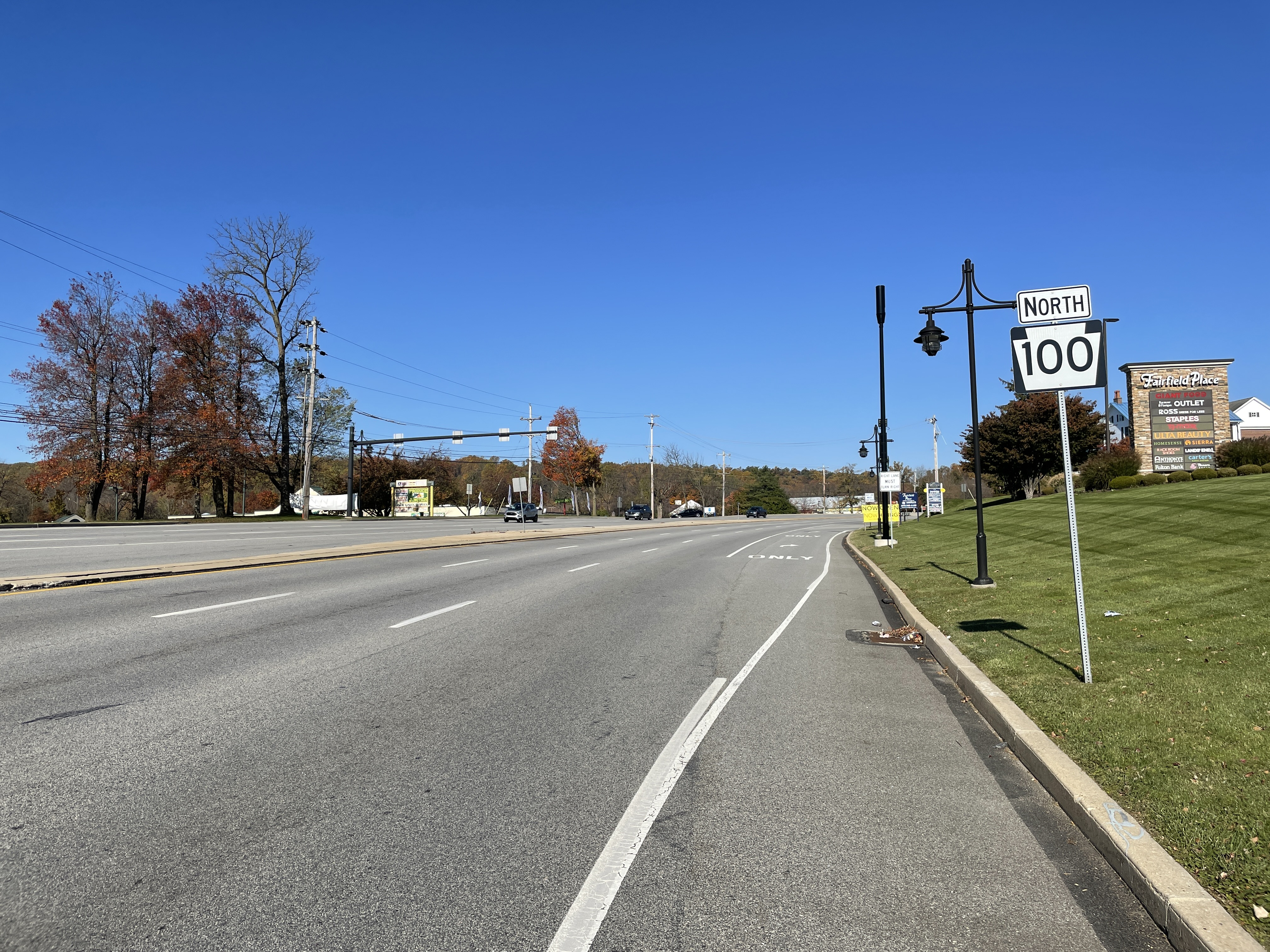
PA 100 northbound in Exton

PA 100 begins at a partial interchange with the US 202 freeway north of West Chester in West Goshen Township, Chester County, with access to southbound US 202 and from northbound US 202. From this interchange, the route heads northwest as a four-lane freeway past suburban development, crossing the East Branch Chester Creek before heading into West Whiteland Township. PA 100 comes to a southbound exit and northbound entrance with Pottstown Pike, at which point PA 100 becomes part of Pottstown Pike. The road passes under Amtrak's Keystone Corridor railroad line west of the Exton station, which serves Amtrak and SEPTA's Paoli/Thorndale Line trains, and an abandoned railroad line before coming to an interchange with the US 30 freeway, where PA 100 becomes a four-lane arterial road.

Past the US 30 interchange, the route heads north-northwest into Exton as a six-lane arterial road and passes commercial development, running to the east of the Main Street at Exton shopping center. PA 100 crosses US 30 Bus. (Lincoln Highway) and passes to the west of Exton Square Mall. From here, the route continues north as a divided roadway with several intersections controlled by jughandles. The road heads north past more commercial development and narrows to four lanes as it heads into more wooded areas with some development, crossing into Uwchlan Township. PA 100 passes a northbound weigh station before it comes to an intersection with Marchwood Road/Ship Road. The route curves to the northwest and continues near suburban residential and commercial development, turning to the west and intersecting PA 113 in Lionville. PA 100 heads northwest between woods to the southwest and fields to the northeast as it reaches a double trumpet interchange providing access to the Pennsylvania Turnpike (I-76) at the Downingtown interchange. The road passes near business parks and enters Upper Uwchlan Township as it crosses under the Pennsylvania Turnpike and reaches Eagle.

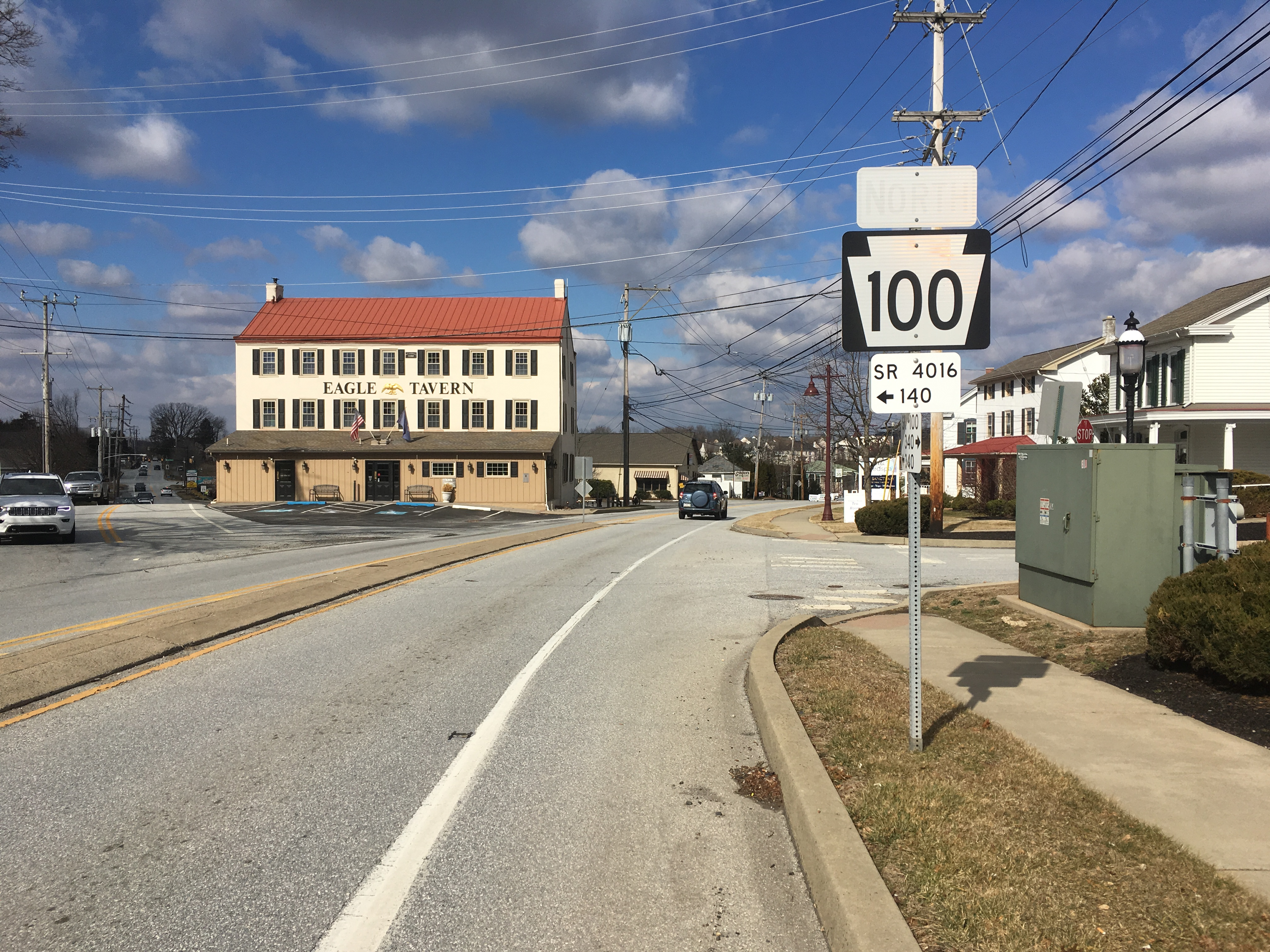
PA 100 northbound in Eagle

Upon reaching Eagle, PA 100 becomes a five-lane road with a center left-turn lane before it turns northwest to remain on two-lane undivided Pottstown Pike, with Graphite Mine Road continuing straight to bypass Eagle to the east. The route passes businesses in the center of Eagle, where it meets Little Conestoga Road adjacent to the Eagle Tavern and briefly becomes a divided highway. From here, PA 100 heads north as a undivided road and intersects with Graphite Mine Road again. The road continues past a mix of residential subdivisions with some farm fields and businesses. PA 100 crosses into West Vincent Township, where it gains a second northbound lane as it passes through woods. The route becomes a three-lane road with a center left-turn lane as it passes commercial development and comes to an intersection with PA 401 in the village of Ludwigs Corner. Following this, PA 100 becomes a two-lane road and runs through a mix of farmland and woodland, crossing into East Nantmeal Township. The road curves northeast through forested areas and enters South Coventry Township, where it turns north and briefly reenters East Nantmeal Township before continuing back into South Coventry Township. The route continues through rural areas with some development, crossing French Creek and passing through Pughtown before it comes to the PA 23 junction in Bucktown.

After this intersection, PA 100 heads north through wooded areas with some farm fields and residences as a three-lane road with a center turn lane. The road crosses Pigeon Creek into North Coventry Township and passes farm fields before entering commercial areas. The route widens into a divided highway as South Hanover Street splits off to the northeast. At this point, the road becomes a partially controlled access highway with at-grade intersections, some grade separations, and no private driveways. PA 100 turns into a two-lane undivided road and passes over Neiman Road on a bridge as it runs through a mix of rural land and development, widening into a four-lane divided highway. The route comes to an interchange with PA 724 to the west of South Pottstown and to the east of The Shoppes at Coventry. A short distance later, the road reaches a cloverleaf interchange with the US 422 freeway.

=== Montgomery and Berks counties ===
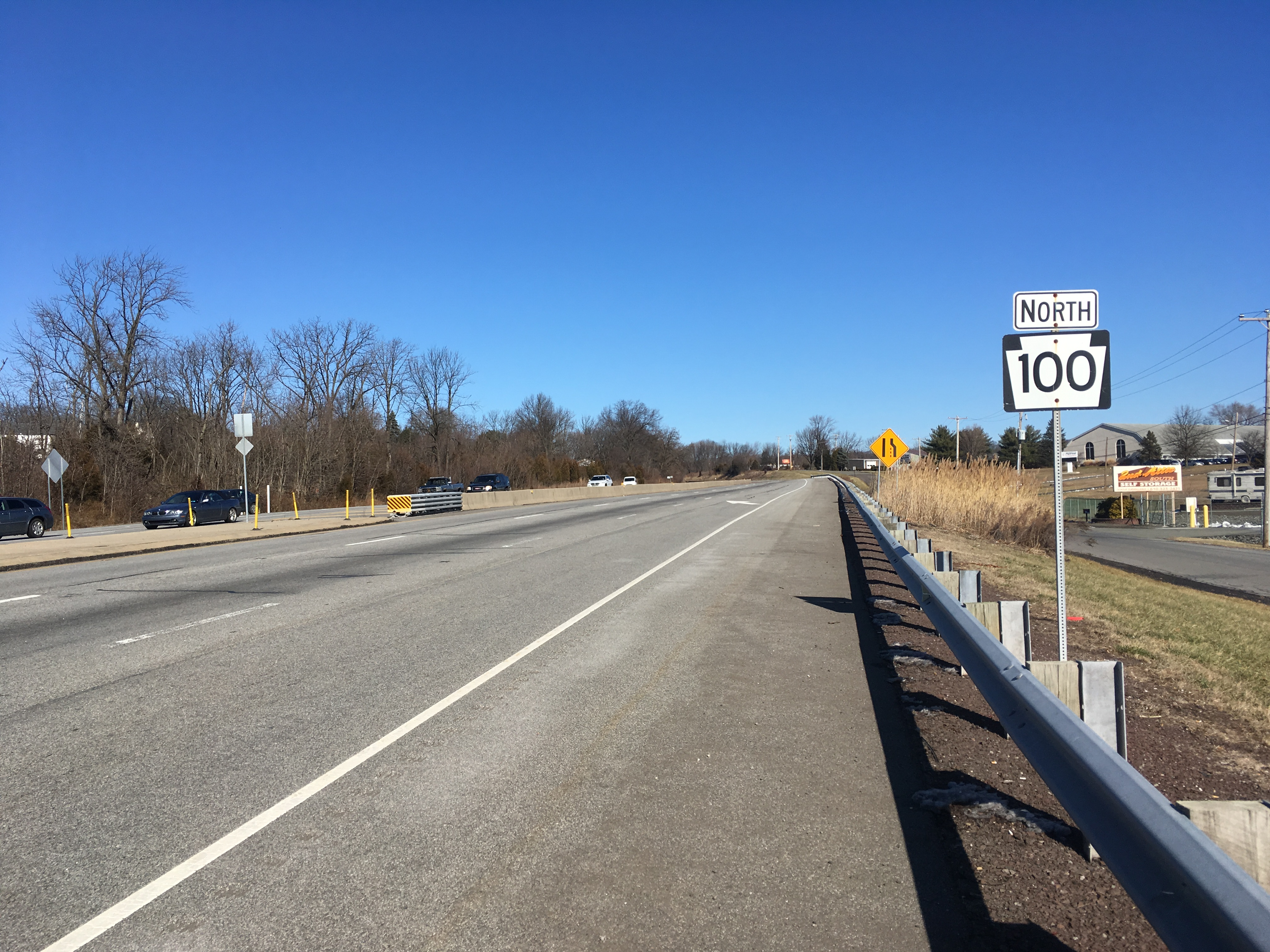
PA 100 northbound in Upper Pottsgrove Township

Upon crossing River Road and the Schuylkill River on a bridge, PA 100 enters Pottstown in Montgomery County, where it heads through woods and passes over the Schuylkill River Trail and Keystone Boulevard before coming to a bridge over Norfolk Southern's Harrisburg Line. The road reaches a partial interchange with West High Street, with access from northbound PA 100 to westbound West High Street and from eastbound West High Street to southbound PA 100. Immediately after, the route passes west of the Pottsgrove Manor historic house museum and intersects the southern terminus of PA 663, which heads east on West King Street. The road runs past businesses and curves northeast, crossing the Colebrookdale branch operated by the Colebrookdale Railroad at-grade and passing over Manatawny Creek and Manatawny Street. PA 100 runs near residential and commercial development, heading through a corner of West Pottsgrove Township before it enters Upper Pottsgrove Township. The road continues north through wooded areas with some nearby homes and businesses, coming to a bridge over Pine Ford Road before reaching a diamond interchange with Farmington Avenue. The route heads northeast through a mix of farmland and woodland, curving north into Douglass Township. PA 100 heads northeast through rural land with some development and turns north to encounter PA 73 at a diamond interchange in Gilbertsville. Past this interchange, the road continues north near commercial development.

Upon crossing County Line Road, PA 100 enters Colebrookdale Township in Berks County and heads north through rural areas with some development as an unnamed road, curving northwest to an interchange with Montgomery Avenue near New Berlinville that provides access to Boyertown and PA 562. Following this interchange, the partially controlled access highway section ends as the route narrows to a two-lane undivided road and passes by businesses. The road heads east of a quarry and enters Washington Township upon crossing Swamp Creek, bypassing Bechtelsville to the east. PA 100 turns to the northeast and passes through a mix of woods and fields with some residential and commercial development. The road intersects Limekiln Road/Passmore Road, with Passmore Road leading east to Grandview Speedway. The route heads through Schultzville before it enters Bally. Upon entering Bally, the road becomes Main Street and passes several homes along with a few businesses. PA 100 leaves Bally for Washington Township again and becomes unnamed, running through farmland with some woods and homes. Upon reaching Clayton, the route crosses into Hereford Township and becomes Chestnut Street, continuing through agricultural areas and crossing Perkiomen Creek before coming to an intersection with PA 29 in Hereford. At this point, PA 29 turns north for a concurrency with PA 100, and the two routes head north into woodland with some fields and residences.

=== Lehigh County ===
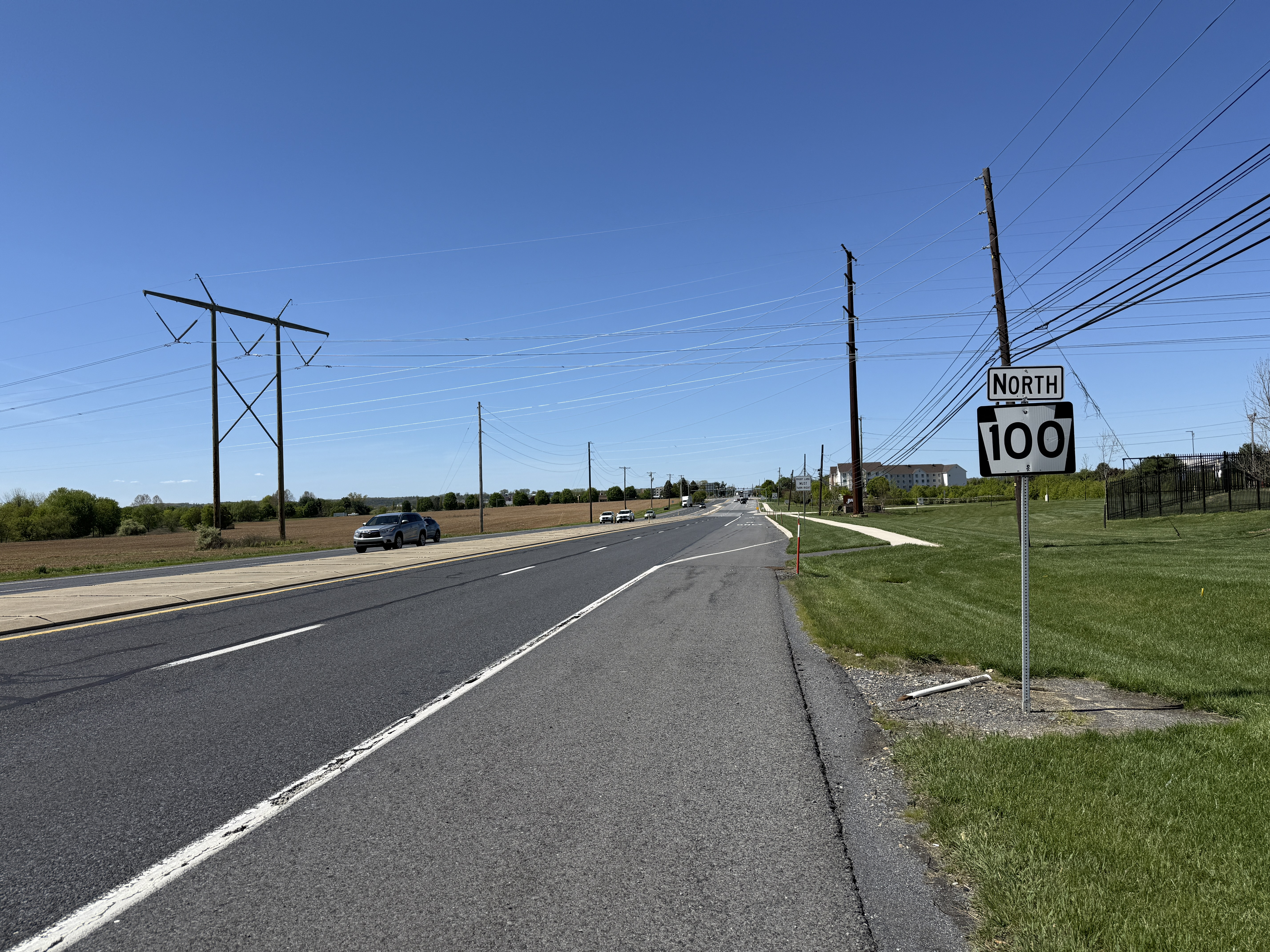
PA 100 northbound past split with US 222 in Trexlertown

PA 29/PA 100 crosses into Upper Milford Township in Lehigh County, which is in the Lehigh Valley, curving northeast through wooded areas with some farmland and development in the South Mountain range. The road turns north near Old Zionsville before it passes through Shimerville. PA 100 splits from PA 29 by turning northwest onto North Kings Highway, with PA 100 Truck heading north along PA 29. The route begins a winding path to the northwest as it descends a hill through a mix of farms and trees. The road heads northwest into Macungie, where it becomes Main Street, a three lane road with a center left-turn lane that passes several homes. PA 100 Truck rejoins at the Chestnut Street intersection and PA 100 continues past more residences and businesses in Macungie.

The route crosses Norfolk Southern's Reading Line at-grade and Swabia Creek, passing more commercial establishments as it enters Lower Macungie Township and becomes an unnamed road. The road heads west through a mix of farmland and residential and commercial development, curving to the northwest and losing the center turn lane. PA 100 crosses Little Lehigh Creek and Norfolk Southern's C&F Secondary railroad line at-grade before it intersects Spring Creek Road, at which point it becomes a two-lane divided expressway that bypasses Trexlertown to the west. The route continues northwest near farmland and residential subdivisions into Upper Macungie Township and intersects Weilers Road, which heads north to Hamilton Boulevard. A short distance later, PA 100 meets US 222 at a partial interchange, where northbound US 222 merges with northbound PA 100 and southbound US 222 splits from southbound PA 100. All other connections between PA 100 and US 222 are provided by Weilers Road and Hamilton Boulevard.

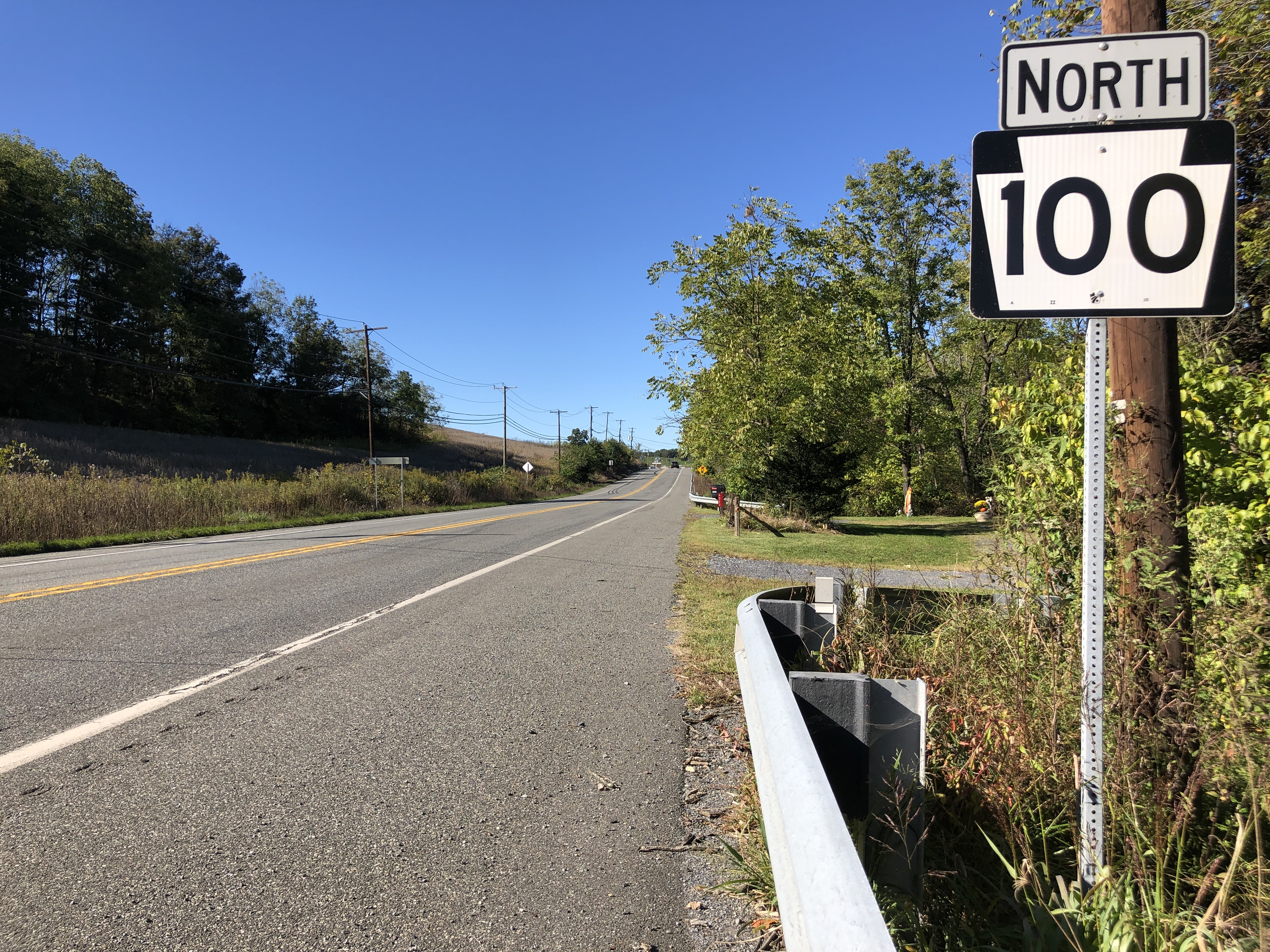
PA 100 northbound in Heidelberg Township

US 222 and PA 100 continue north concurrent as a four-lane divided expressway called the Frederick J. Jaindl Jr. Memorial Highway, passing near homes and intersecting Grim Road/Cetronia Road at-grade. The road curves northeast and runs between warehouses to the northwest and housing developments to the southeast. PA 100 splits from US 222 at a diamond interchange, at which point PA 100 continues north and Trexlertown Road heads south. The route runs north-northwest through a mix of farm fields and an industrial/warehouse area as an unnamed four-lane divided highway. The road passes businesses and crosses Schantz Road and a Norfolk Southern Railroad branch at-grade before reaching a cloverleaf interchange with I-78/US 22. Past this, PA 100 heads into Fogelsville and crosses Main Street/Tilghman Street. The route passes through commercial areas and narrows to a two-lane undivided road, continuing through wooded areas and turning to the northwest.

The road enters Lowhill Township and runs through a mix of farmland and woodland with some development, passing through Claussville. PA 100 winds northwest through more rural areas, running through Lyon Valley. The road heads north into more wooded areas and crosses the Jordan Creek in Lowhill Township. The route runs alongside the creek and winds northwest into Heidelberg Township. PA 100 continues north to its northern terminus at a T-intersection with PA 309 in Pleasant Corners.

== History ==
Pennsylvania Route 62
- Location: Pennsbury Township–Pleasant Corners
- Existed: 1927–1932

When Pennsylvania first legislated routes in 1911, what would become PA 100 was legislated as Legislative Route 282 between the Delaware border and Lenape, Legislative Route 134 between Lenape and West Chester, Legislative Route 147 between West Chester and Pottstown, Legislative Route 284 between Pottstown and Hereford, and Legislative Route 158 between Hereford and Shimerville. At this time, the road was paved between Boyertown and north of Bally. By 1926, the entire length of the road between Chadds Ford and north of Hereford was paved. PA 62 was designated in 1927 to run from the Delaware border south of Chadds Ford north to US 309/PA 312 in Allentown.

The route followed the Brandywine Creek through Chadds Ford to Lenape, where it ran concurrent with PA 52 to West Chester. From here, PA 62 headed north along Pottstown Pike to Pottstown, where it passed through West Chester on Hanover Street. The route continued north on Farmington Avenue to Boyertown and ran through Bechtelsville and Barto on its way to Bally. PA 62 ran north along present-day PA 100 to Shimerville, where it continued to Allentown. A northern section of PA 62 was designated between PA 15 in Wilkes-Barre and US 106/PA 7 (now US 6) in Tunkhannock. A year later, PA 62 was realigned at Shimerville to head north through Macungie, Trexlertown, and Fogelsville to its new northern terminus at an intersection with PA 29 (now PA 309) in Pleasant Corners. PA 29 replaced the PA 62 designation between Shimerville and Allentown. By this time, the route was paved from north of Bally to Macungie. The northern section of PA 62 was decommissioned in 1928 and replaced with PA 92 (now PA 309 south of Bowman Creek and PA 29 north of Bowman Creek). By 1930, the route was paved between the Delaware border and Chadds Ford and between Macungie, and Fogelsville. At this time, the road was under construction from Fogelsville to north of Claussville.

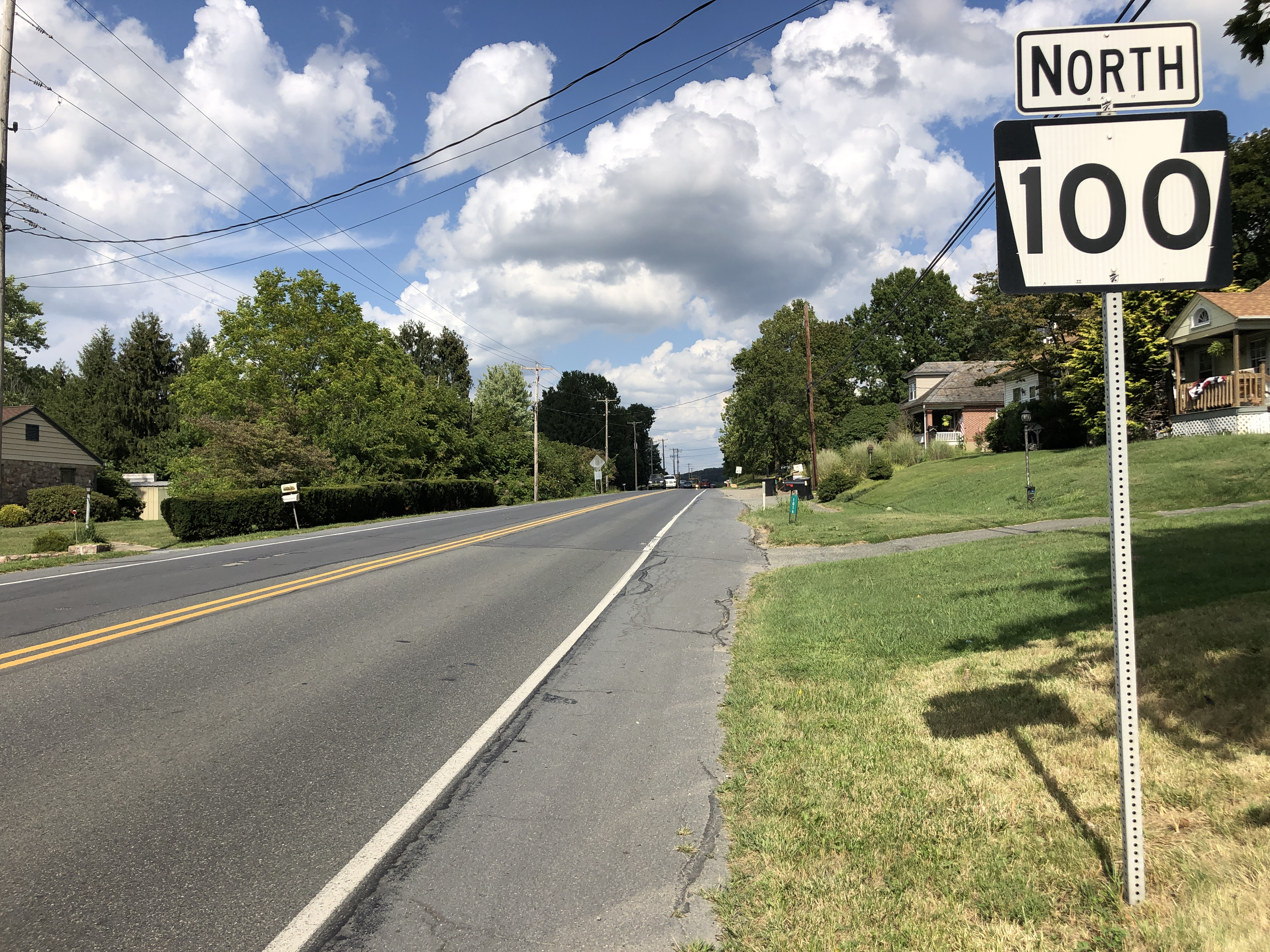
PA 100 northbound in Washington Township

PA 62 was renumbered to PA 100 on June 1, 1932, in order to avoid conflicting with US 62, which was designated in the northwestern part of the state. The road was paved between Fogelsville and Pleasant Corners during the 1930s. At the Delaware border, PA 100 connected to DE 100, which was designated in 1938. By 1953, PA 100 was realigned to its current straight alignment between south of Bechtelsville and Bally, bypassing Bechtelsville and Barto to the east. The former alignment is now known as Main Street and Old Route 100.

In 1954, the current alignment between Hanover Street in North Coventry Township and Farmington Avenue in Upper Pottsgrove Township was built, with interchanges at PA 83 (now PA 724) and US 422 (High Street). At this time, PA 100 still continued through Pottstown on Hanover Street and Farmington Avenue. In the 1950s, a realigned US 309 replaced the PA 100 designation between US 22 in Fogelsville and Pleasant Corners. By 1959, PA 100 was widened into a divided highway between Boot Road and US 30 (now US 30 Bus.) in Exton.

The northern terminus of PA 100 was extended back to Pleasant Corners at US 309 in 1962, replacing the former US 309 designation between Fogelsville and Pleasant Corners that was realigned to present-day PA 309 between Allentown and Pleasant Corners.

In 1964, the current divided highway alignment of PA 100 was built between Farmington Avenue in Upper Pottsgrove Township and New Berlinville, which included interchanges at Farmington Avenue, PA 73, and Montgomery Avenue. PA 100 was rerouted to the new alignment between Hanover Street in North Coventry Township and New Berlinville; the former alignment is now Hanover Street, Farmington Avenue, PA 562, and Reading Avenue.

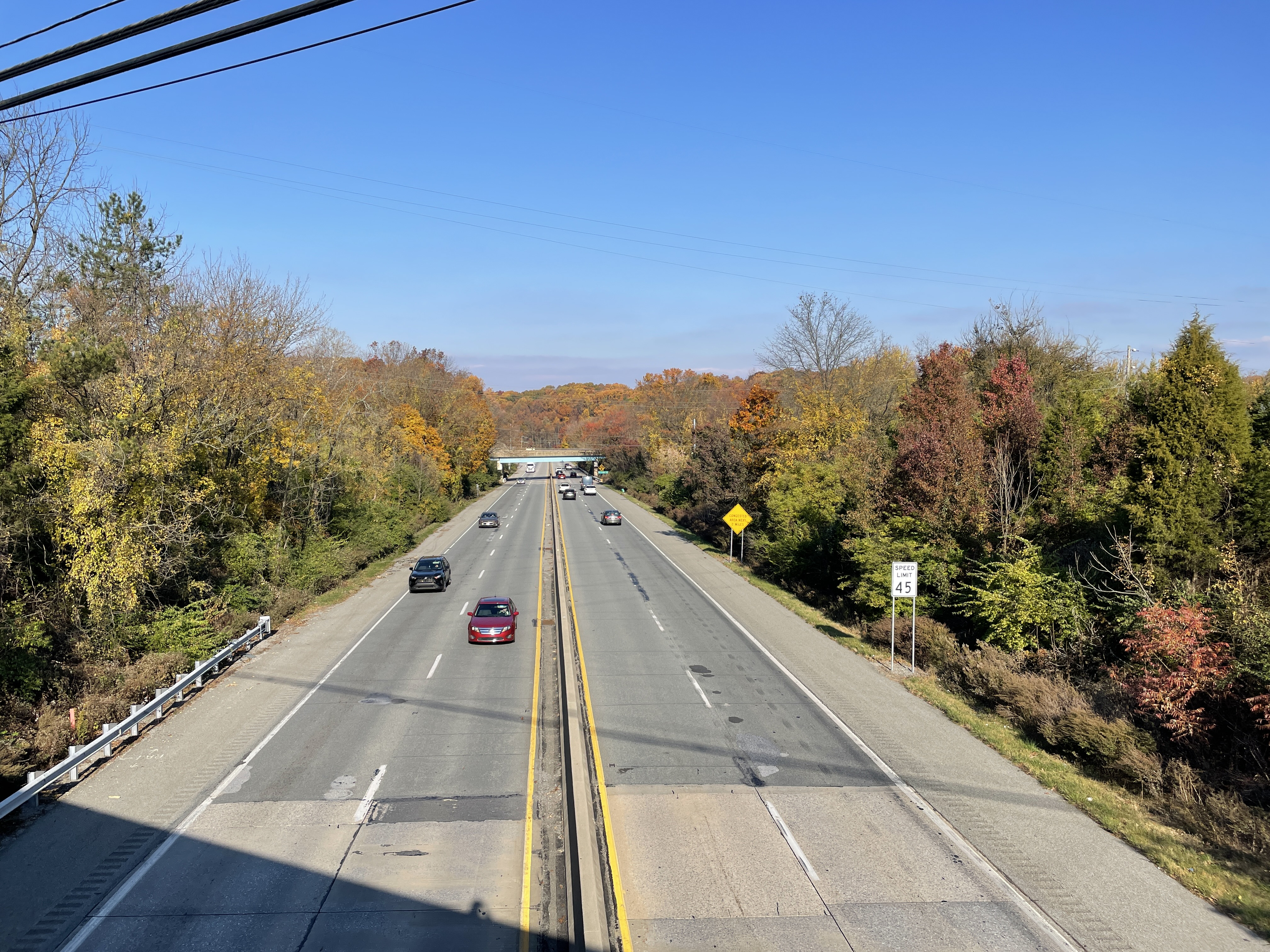
PA 100 freeway northbound in West Whiteland Township

In the 1960s, the Pennsylvania Department of Highways planned for an expressway just east of the PA 100 corridor that would run from the Pennsylvania Turnpike interchange in Uwchlan Township to US 202 near West Chester, though these plans were never fully realized. However, in 1968, a 2-mile (3.2 km) long, four-lane freeway was built connecting PA 100 south of Exton to US 202 north of West Chester. The freeway was officially unsigned, but was colloquially referred to as the "PA 100 Spur" and was designated as State Route 2023 (SR 2023) when the Location Referencing System was established in 1987. In the 1970s, PA 100 was widened into a divided highway between Exton and Lionville.

In 1988, plans were made to bypass the section of PA 100 through the village of Eagle, which was narrow and suffered from traffic congestion. After years-long delays due to funding issues, construction on the Eagle Bypass began in 2003. The bypass was completed between Byers Road and PA 100 north of Eagle in fall 2005, and the remainder of the bypass south to PA 100 south of Eagle was completed on August 19, 2009. The bypass was named Graphite Mine Road and is designated as SR 1055 from PA 100 south of Eagle north to Byers Road and is a local township road from Byers Road north to PA 100 north of Eagle. PA 100 continues to follow Pottstown Pike through the center of Eagle.

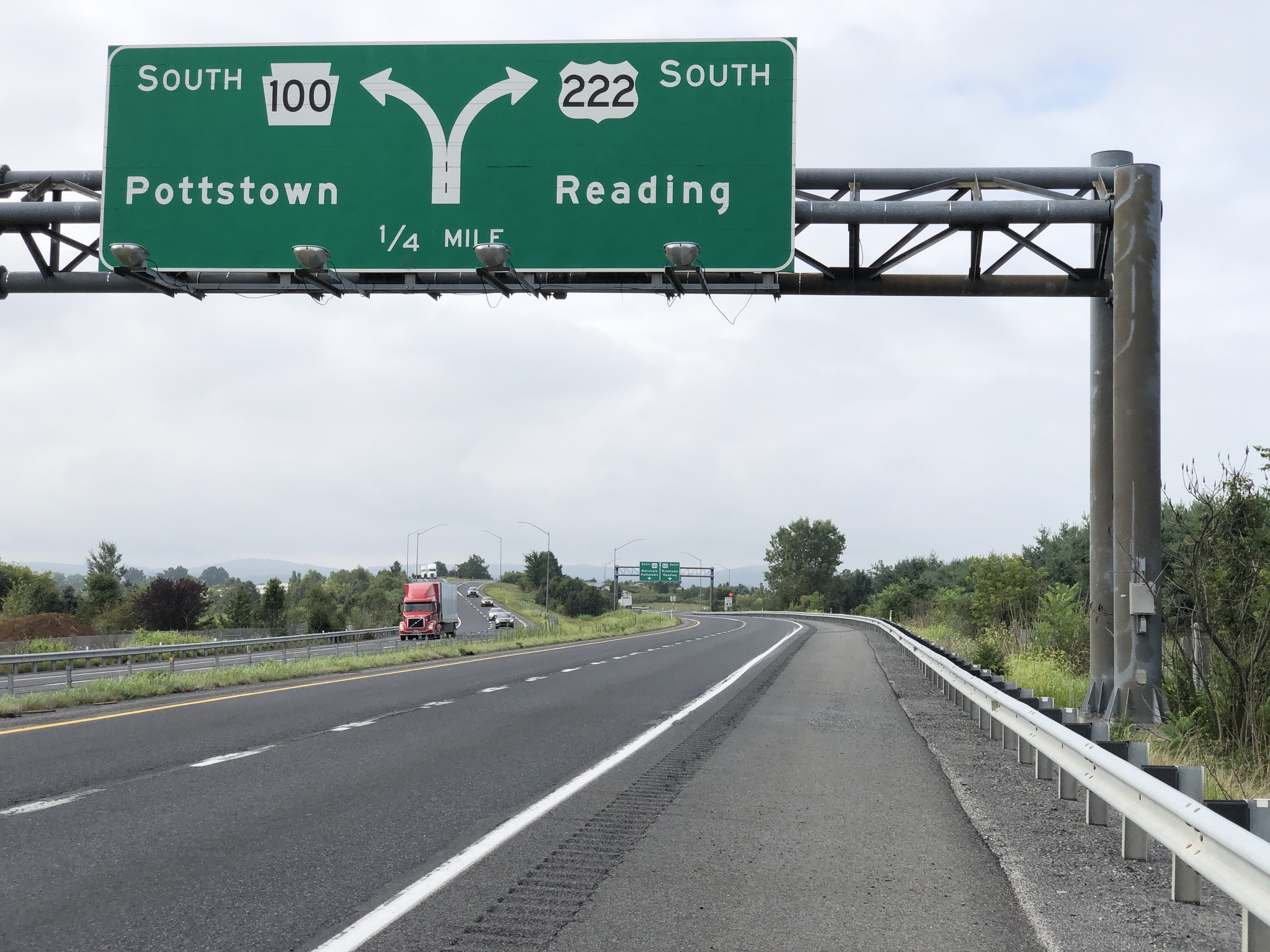
PA 100 southbound at split with US 222 in Trexlertown

In 2002, construction began on the Trexlertown Bypass, a four-lane divided highway route for PA 100 and US 222 that would bypass Trexlertown to the west. PA 100 was rerouted onto the bypass upon its completion on September 29, 2005. The former alignment through Trexlertown became known as Trexlertown Road, which is designated SR 6100. US 222 was moved onto the bypass on September 28, 2007, following the opening of an extension of the bypass east that allowed US 222 to bypass Trexlertown. The bypass cost $144 million to build.

In 2003, the southern terminus of PA 100 was moved from the Delaware border to its current location at an interchange with US 202, being rerouted to follow the former "PA 100 Spur" freeway connecting US 202 to Exton. PA 100 was truncated in order to reduce truck traffic along the streets of downtown West Chester and the rural roads south of the borough. Plans to remove the PA 100 designation along this stretch dated back to 1990 when the municipalities along the route, with support from the West Chester Regional Planning Commission, passed resolutions to remove the designation. The plan was approved by the Chester County Planning Commission in 1999 and was approved by PennDOT in 2002. The sudden truncation of the route caused confusion to motorists and affected businesses along the route, resulting in Chadds Ford Township placing "Old Route 100" signs along the former alignment to reduce motorist confusion. The former route of PA 100 between the Delaware border and south of Exton was designated SR 3100 in Chester County and SR 3101 in Delaware County, following Chadds Ford Road, Creek Road, Lenape Road, Price Street, High Street, and Pottstown Pike. Delaware continues to designate DE 100 starting at the state line where PA 100 formerly was and continuing south 9 miles (14 km) to its terminus at DE 4 south of Elsmere.

== Major intersections ==
County	Location	mi	km	Destinations	Notes
Chester	West Goshen Township	0.000	0.000	US 202 south	Southern terminus; access to West Chester University
Chester	West Whiteland Township	2.891	4.653	Pottstown Pike south	Southbound exit and northbound entrance; former PA 100
Chester	West Whiteland Township	2.891	4.653	Northern end of freeway section	
Chester	West Whiteland Township	3.277	5.274	US 30 – Downingtown, Lancaster, King of Prussia, Philadelphia	Interchange
Chester	West Whiteland Township	3.837	6.175	US 30 Bus. (Lincoln Highway) – Downingtown, Frazer	
Chester	Uwchlan Township	5.137	8.267	Weigh station (northbound)	
Chester	Uwchlan Township	6.769	10.894	PA 113 (Uwchlan Avenue) – Downingtown, Phoenixville	
Chester	Uwchlan Township	7.710	12.408	Penna Turnpike	Exit 312 (Downingtown) on Penna Turnpike
Chester	West Vincent Township	11.710	18.845	PA 401 (Conestoga Road) – Elverson, Malvern	
Chester	South Coventry Township	16.562	26.654	PA 23 (Ridge Road) – Saint Peters, Phoenixville	
Chester	North Coventry Township	20.675	33.273	PA 724 – Birdsboro, Kenilworth, Phoenixville	Interchange; signed for Kenilworth northbound, Phoenixville southbound
Chester	North Coventry Township	21.115	33.981	US 422 – King of Prussia, Reading	Interchange
Montgomery	Pottstown	21.751	35.005	High Street west	Interchange; northbound access to High Street westbound and southbound access from High Street eastbound
Montgomery	Pottstown	21.784	35.058	PA 663 north (King Street)	Southern terminus of PA 663
Montgomery	Upper Pottsgrove Township	24.813	39.933	Farmington Avenue	Interchange
Montgomery	Douglass Township	27.787	44.719	PA 73 (East Philadelphia Avenue) – Boyertown, Gilbertsville	Interchange
Berks	Colebrookdale Township	29.159	46.927	New Berlinville	Interchange; access via Montgomery Avenue; to PA 562
Berks	Hereford Township	37.539	60.413	PA 29 south (Gravel Pike) – East Greenville	Southern terminus of PA 29 concurrency
Lehigh	Upper Milford Township	41.611	66.966	PA 29 north / PA 100 Truck north – Emmaus, Allentown	Northern terminus of PA 29 concurrency
Lehigh	Macungie	43.367	69.792	PA 100 Truck south (Chestnut Street) – Emmaus	
Lehigh	Upper Macungie Township	47.913	77.108	US 222 south – Kutztown, Reading	Interchange; southbound exit and northbound entrance; southern terminus of US 222 concurrency
Lehigh	Upper Macungie Township	49.224	79.218	US 222 north – Allentown; Trexlertown Road – Trexlertown	Interchange; northern terminus of US 222 concurrency
Lehigh	Upper Macungie Township	50.904	81.922	I-78 / US 22 – Allentown, Harrisburg	Exit 49 on I-78/US 22
Lehigh	Heidelberg Township	59.409	95.610	PA 309 – Tamaqua, Hazleton, Allentown	Northern terminus
1.000 mi = 1.609 km; 1.000 km = 0.621 mi: Concurrency terminus; Electronic toll collection; Incomplete access

== PA 100 Truck ==
Pennsylvania Route 100 Truck
- Location: Macungie
- Length: 3.1 mi (5.0 km)

Pennsylvania Route 100 Truck is a truck bypass of a winding portion of PA 100 between the north end of the PA 29 concurrency and Macungie on which trucks with trailers over 45 feet are not allowed. The route heads north on PA 29 before heading west along Buckeye Road and Chestnut Street concurrent with PA 29 Truck.
