= New Berlinville, Pennsylvania =

Unincorporated community in Pennsylvania, US

- Census-designated place
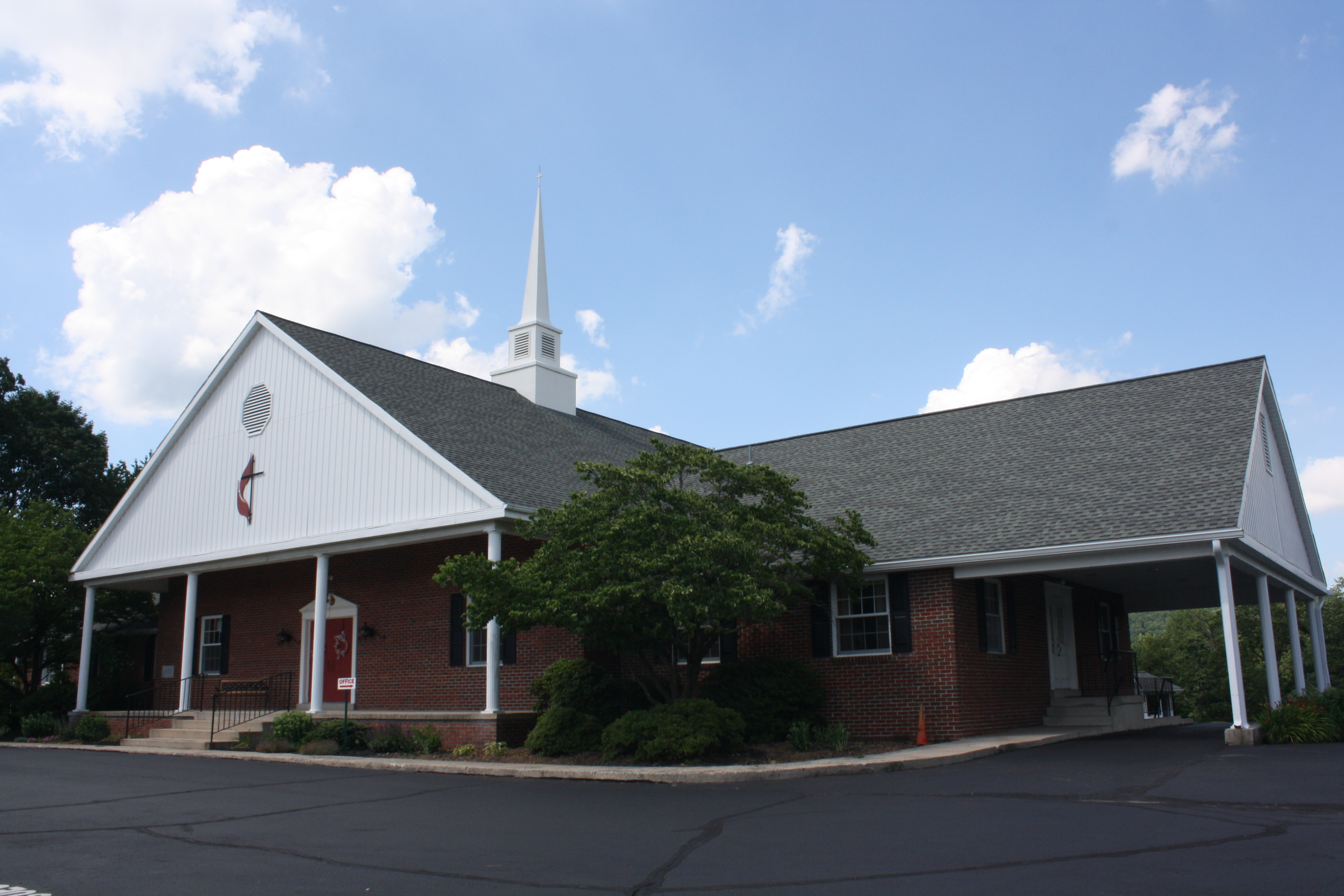
- St. Andrew United Methodist Church in New Berlinville

- Location within Pennsylvania Location within the United States
- Coordinates: 40°20′43″N 75°37′59″W
- Country: United States
- State: Pennsylvania
- County: Berks
- Township: Colebrookdale

Area
  - Total: 1.51 sq mi (3.91 km^{2})
  - Land: 1.51 sq mi (3.90 km^{2})
  - Water: 0.0039 sq mi (0.01 km^{2})
- Elevation: 390 ft (120 m)

Population (2020)
  - Total: 1,382
  - Density: 917.2/sq mi (354.12/km^{2})
- Time zone: UTC-5 (Eastern (EST))
  - Summer (DST): UTC-4 (EDT)
- ZIP code: 19545
- Area codes: 610 & 484
- FIPS code: 42-53208
- GNIS feature ID: 1182285

New Berlinville is a census-designated place (CDP) in Colebrookdale Township, Pennsylvania. It is located along Pennsylvania Route 100, approximately one mile northeast of the borough of Boyertown. As of the 2010 census, the population was 1,368 residents.

Historical population
Census	Pop.	Note	%±
2020	1,382		—
U.S. Decennial Census
