= Bake Oven Knob =

Mountain in Pennsylvania, United States of America

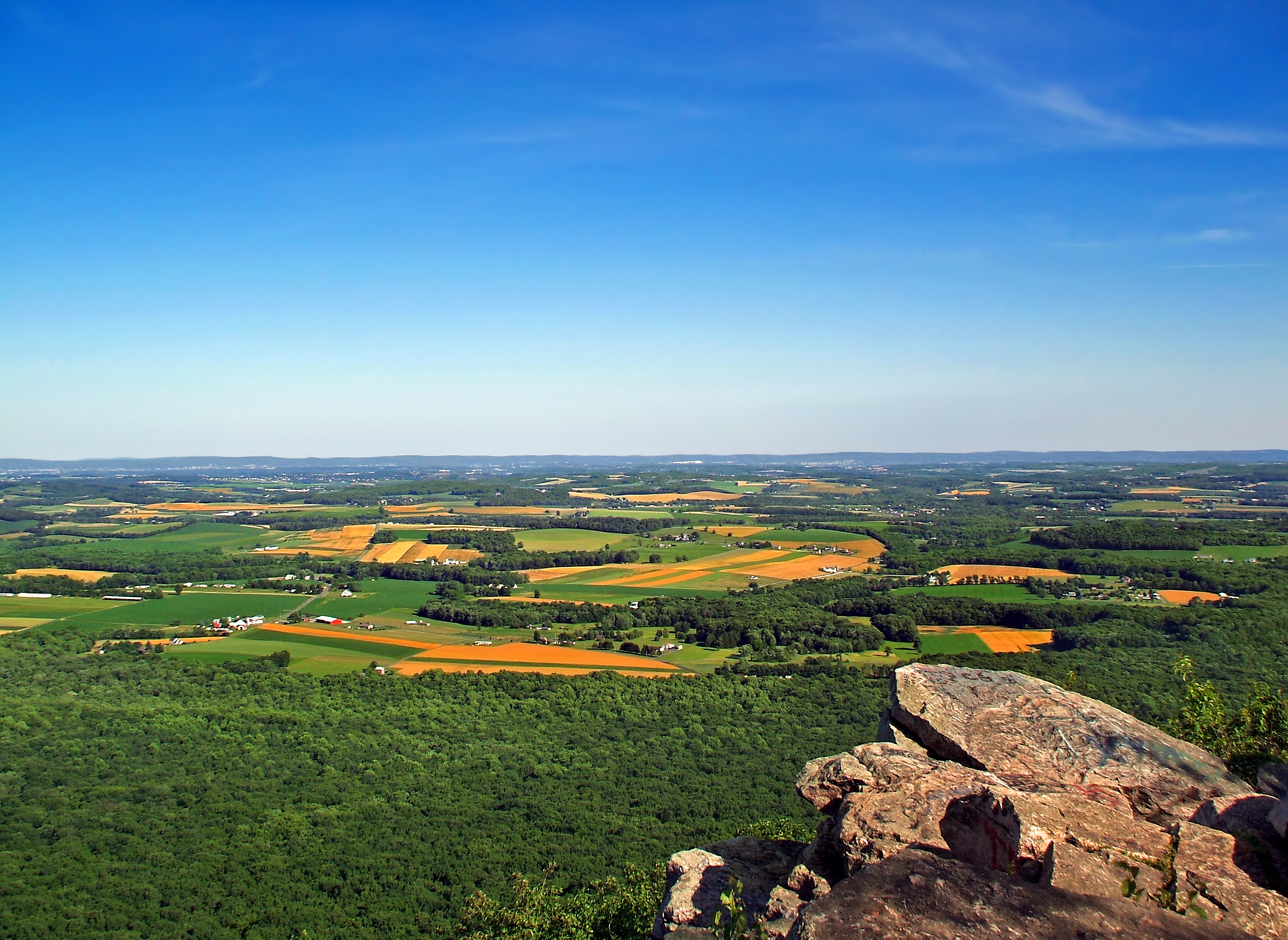
- View of the Lehigh Valley from the Appalachian Trail at Bake Oven Knob, June 2007

Highest point
- Elevation: 1,595 ft (486 m)
- Prominence: 160 ft (49 m)
- Coordinates: 40°44′55″N 75°44′02″W

Geography
- Location within Pennsylvania
- Location: Carbon County, Pennsylvania

Climbing
- Easiest route: Appalachian Trail, from nearby parking in Germansville, Pennsylvania

Bake Oven Knob is a high point on the Blue Mountain ridge of the Appalachian Mountains near Germansville, Pennsylvania. Due to its location on the Appalachian Trail and proximity to many towns in the Lehigh Valley metropolitan area, it has become a popular spot for hiking.

== Hiking ==
Bake Oven Knob is a relatively accessible location on the Appalachian Trail. Parking is located just 0.4 miles (0.64 km) from the site. The hike has an elevation gain of about 40 feet (12 m). The hike is rocky, which a few points that require some scrambling, especially when attempting to reach certain lookouts.

== Lookouts ==
Bake Oven Knob offers views on either side of the Appalachian Trail, facing north and south, making the spot popular for hawk and eagle watching. However, due to their accessibility, these lookouts are often crowded, and have become heavily vandalized.

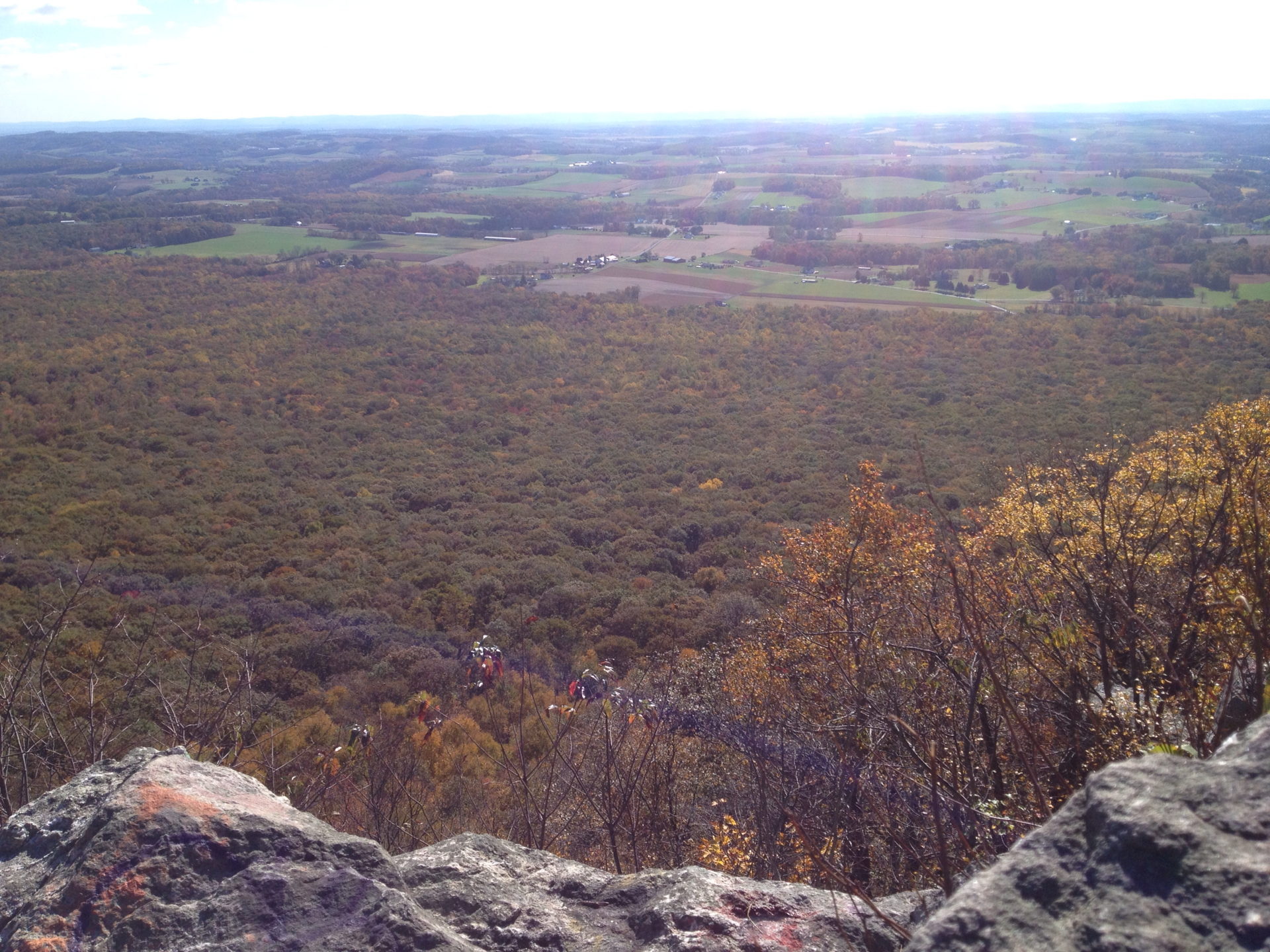

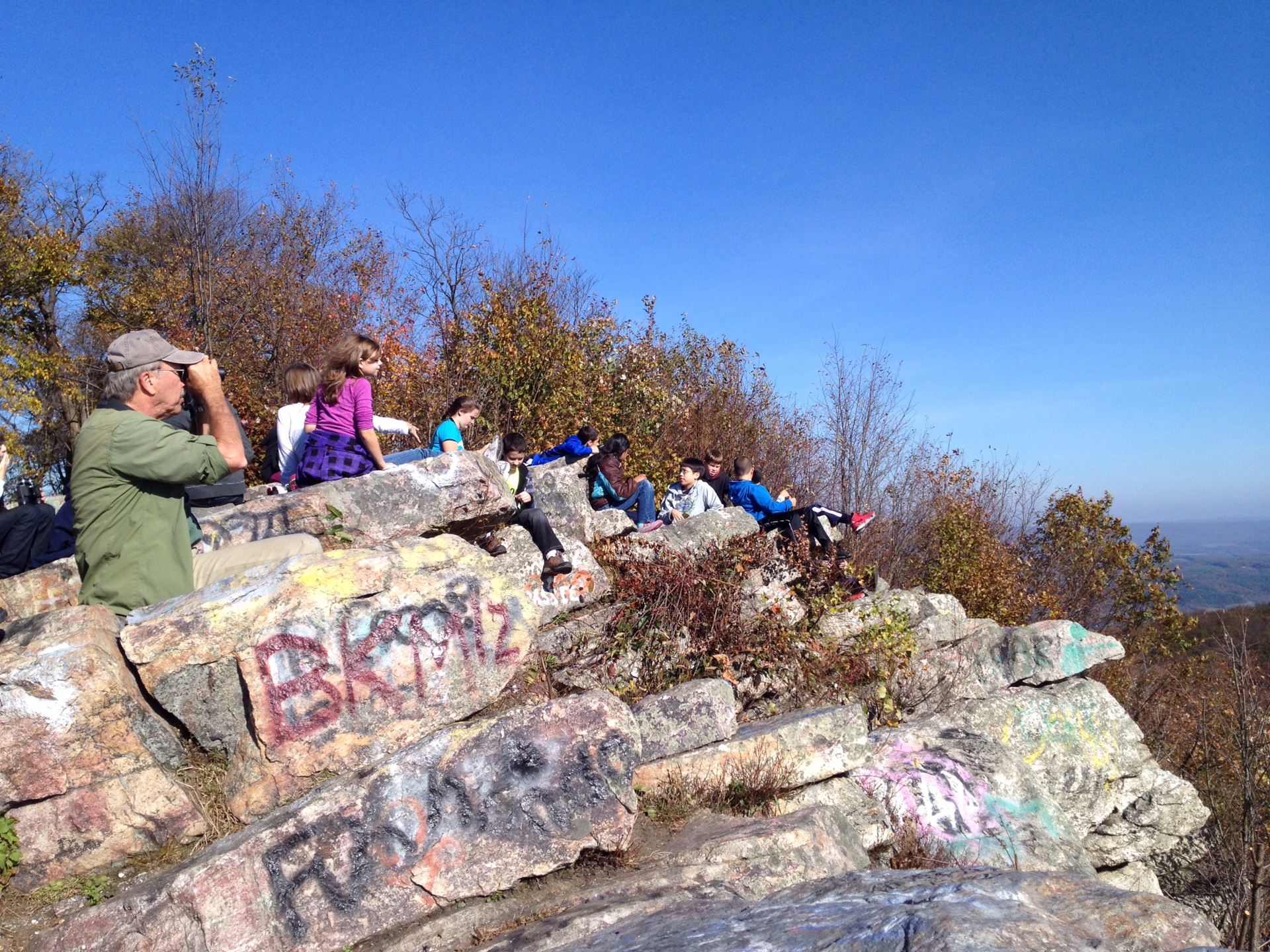

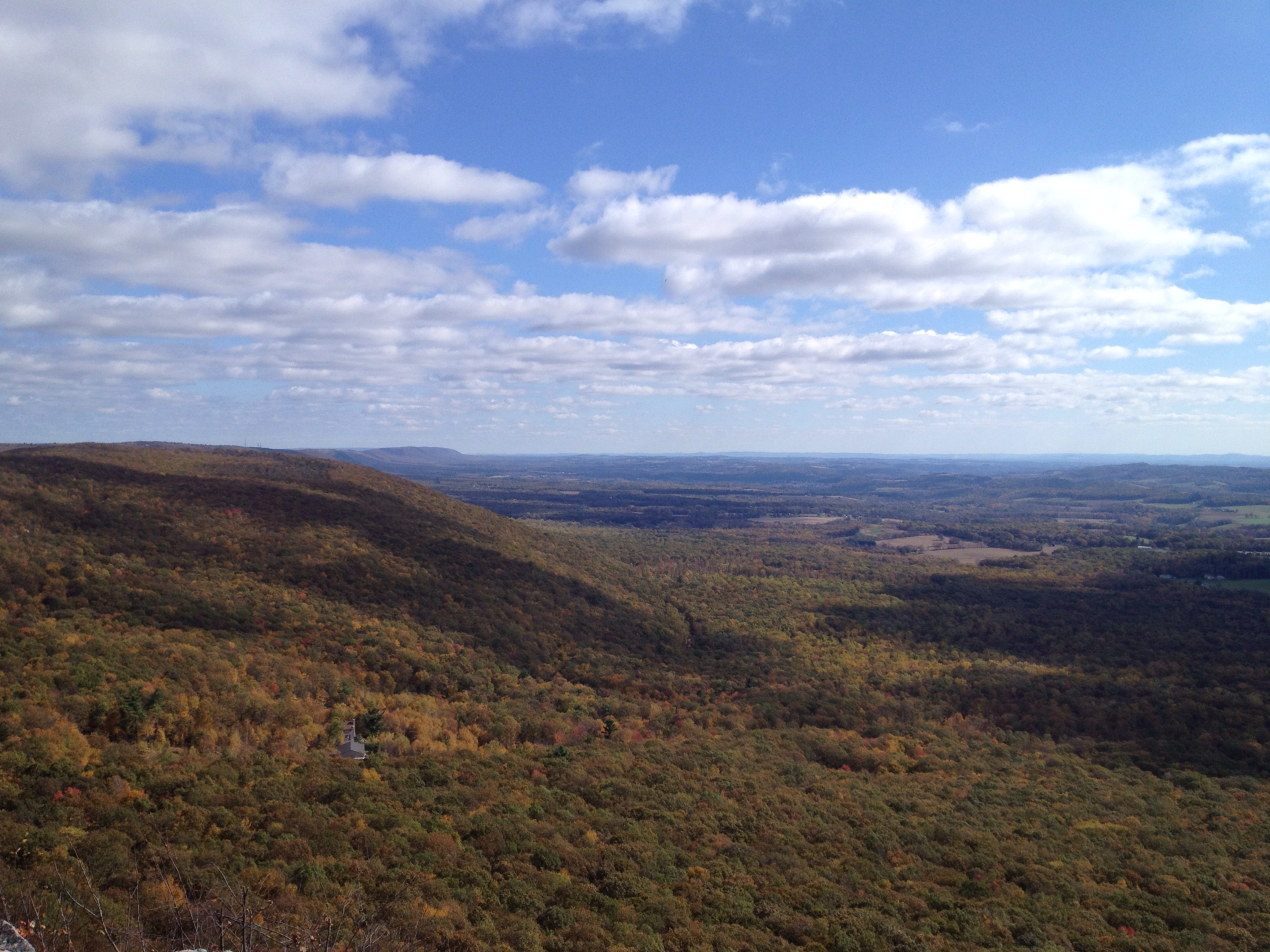

== Shelter ==
The Bake Oven Shelter is located about 0.5 miles (0.80 km) north from Bake Oven Knob on the Appalachian Trail. The shelter is one of the oldest of its kind in Pennsylvania, having been constructed in 1937. It has accommodations for about six people, but has no outhouse. There is a spring at the site of the shelter, but it is occasionally dry. Another spring can be found about 0.1 miles (0.16 km) north on the Trail.
