= Germansville, Pennsylvania =

Unincorporated community in Pennsylvania, US

- Unincorporated community
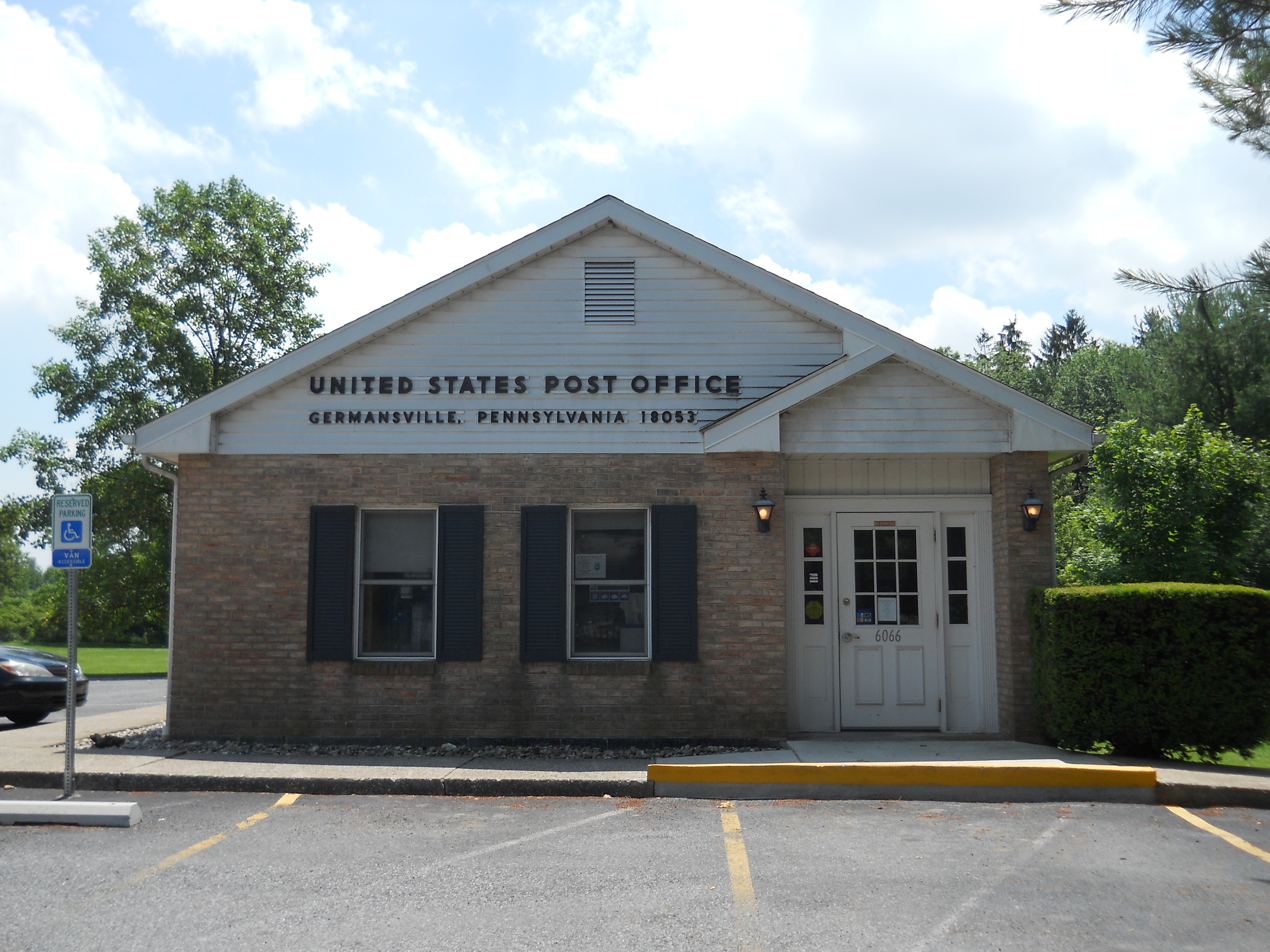
- The U.S. Post Office in Germansville, June 2013

- Location within Pennsylvania Location within the United States
- Coordinates: 40°42′05″N 75°42′25″W
- Country: United States
- State: Pennsylvania
- County: Lehigh
- Township: Heidelberg
- Elevation: 604 ft (184 m)

Population
  - Metro: 865,310 (US: 68th)
- Time zone: UTC-5 (EST)
  - Summer (DST): UTC-4 (EDT)
- ZIP Code: 18053
- Area codes: 610 and 484
- GNIS feature ID: 1175559

Germansville (/ˈɡɜːrmənsvɪl/ GER-məns-vil) is an exurban, unincorporated community which is located in Heidelberg Township in Lehigh County, Pennsylvania.

It is part of the Lehigh Valley, which has a population of 861,899 and was the 68th-most populous metropolitan area in the U.S. as of the 2020 census.

== Geography ==
Situated on Jordan Creek, it is located approximately two miles (3.2 km) north of Pleasant Corners and 20 miles (32 km) northwest of Allentown.
