= Pleasant Corners, Lehigh County, Pennsylvania =

Unincorporated community in Pennsylvania, US

Pleasant Corners, Pennsylvania
- Unincorporated community
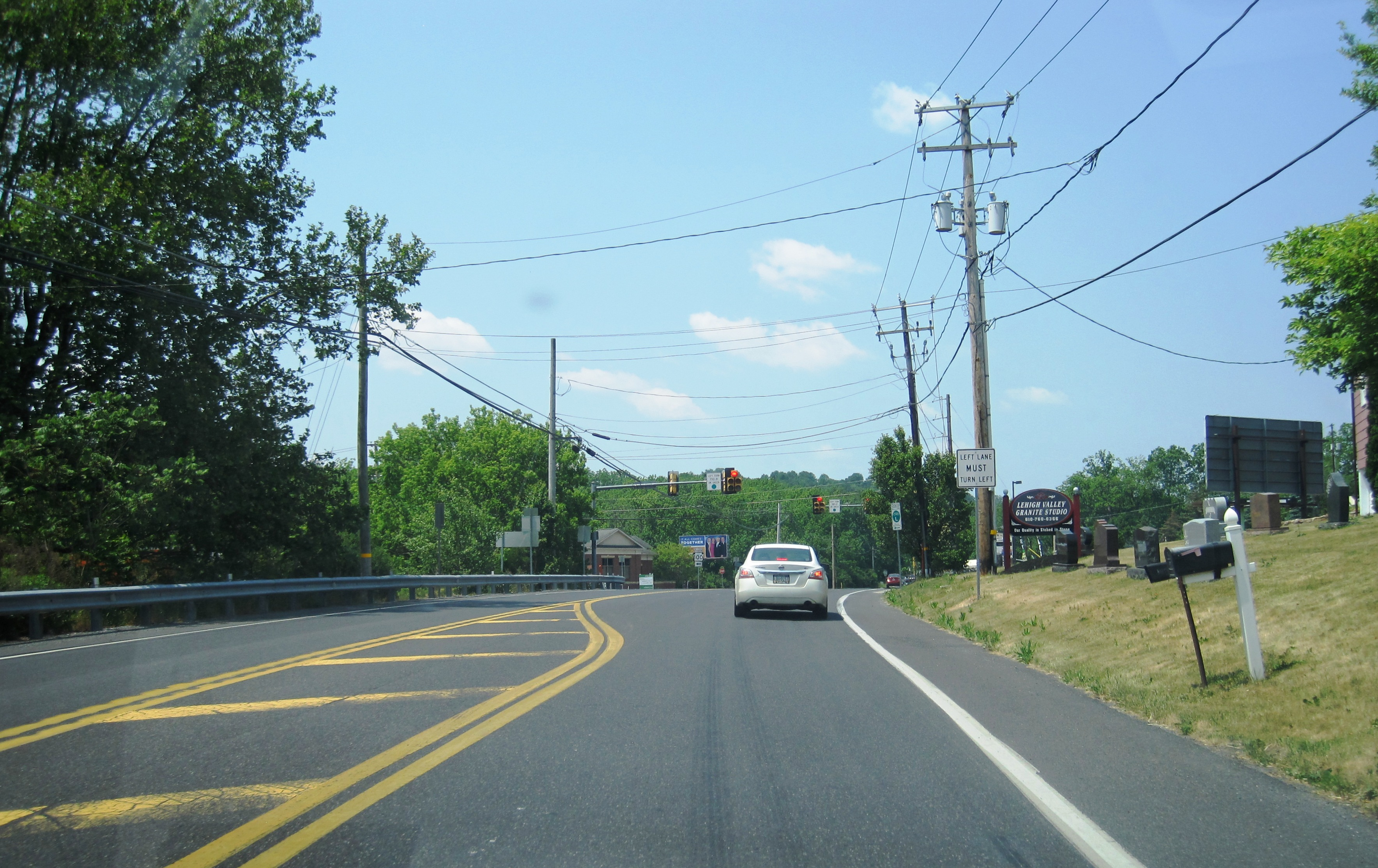
- PA 309 at PA 100 in Pleasant Corners

- Location within Pennsylvania Location within the United States
- Coordinates: 40°41′0″N 75°41′26″W
- Country: United States
- State: Pennsylvania
- County: Lehigh
- Township: Heidelberg
- Elevation: 568 ft (173 m)

Population
  - Metro: 865,310 (US: 68th)
- Time zone: UTC-5 (Eastern (EST))
  - Summer (DST): UTC-4 (EDT)
- Area codes: 610 and 484
- GNIS feature ID: 1199318

Pleasant Corners is an unincorporated community in Heidelberg Township, Lehigh County, Pennsylvania, United States. Pleasant Corners is located at the intersection of state routes 100 and 309 between New Tripoli and Schnecksville. Pleasant Corners is part of the Lehigh Valley, which has a population of 861,899 and is the 68th-most populous metropolitan area in the U.S. as of the 2020 census.

Jacob Holben erected a foundry in 1850 and the settlement was named Holbensville in his honor. In 1857, it was renamed Pleasant Corners.
