= Conestoga Road =

Historic road in Pennsylvania, United States

Coordinates: 40.02880°N 75.35920°W

Route information
- Existed: 1684–present

Major junctions
- West end: Allegheny Valley
- East end: Allegheny Avenue in Philadelphia

Location
- Country: United States
- State: Pennsylvania

Highway system
- Pennsylvania State Route System; Interstate; US; State; Scenic; Legislative

Conestoga Road, also called "Conestoga Pike" or "Allegheny Path", is a historic road dating from at least 1684 in what is now the U.S. state of Pennsylvania. It starts as Allegheny Avenue in Philadelphia to the west through Morgantown, Harrisburg and west towards the Allegheny Valley. Originally the road was a walking path that was 12–18 inches in width. During the era of horse drawn Conestoga wagons, the road was widened. During most of its existence as a turnpike, it served as the alternate route to the Lancaster Pike and Ridge Road (present day Pennsylvania Route 23). The route gained notoriety as the shortest route from Philadelphia to Harrisburg.

== Route description ==
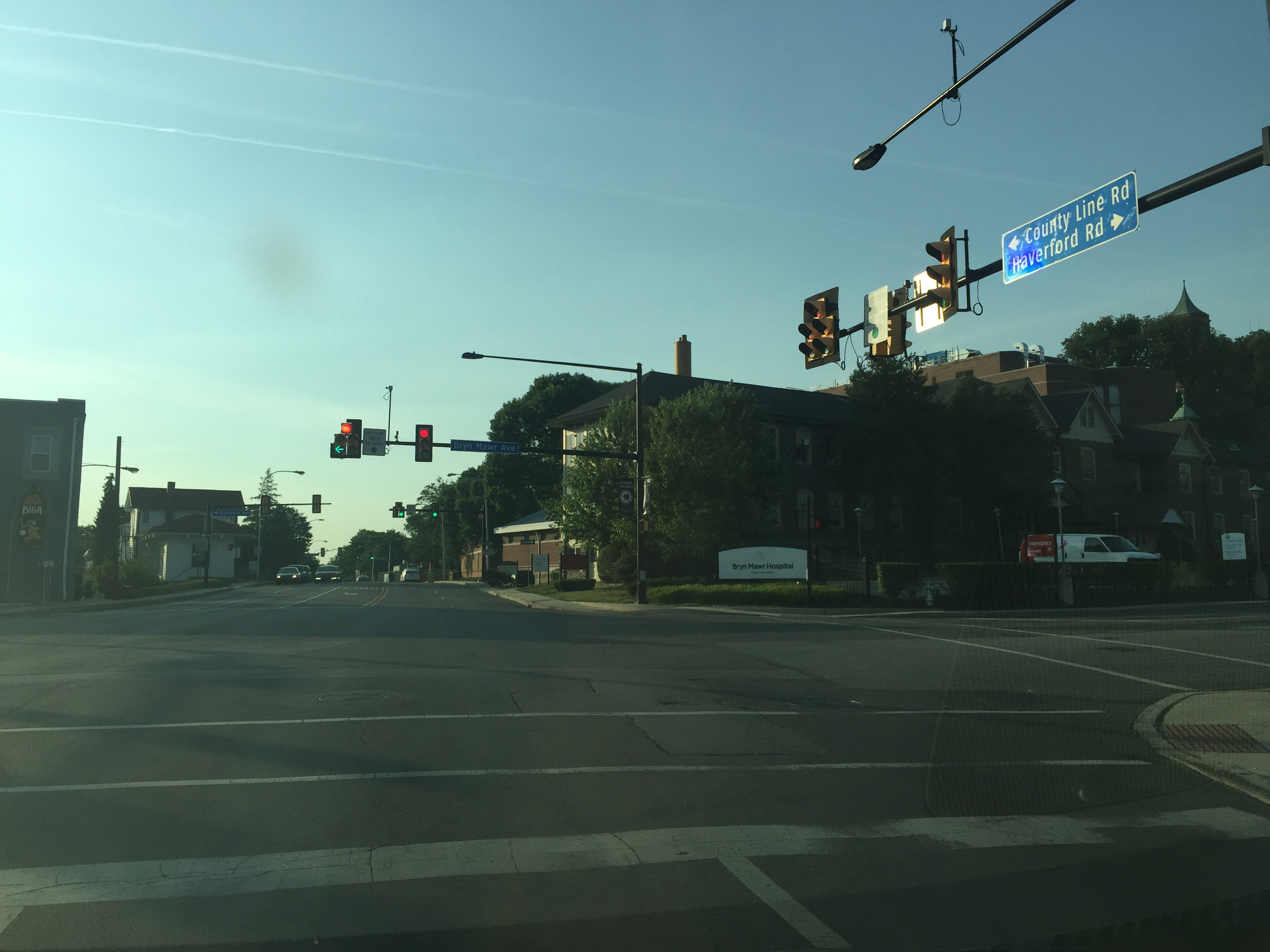
Conestoga Road passing by Bryn Mawr Hospital as County Line Road

From Philadelphia, the road follows modern-day Montgomery Avenue through Wynnewood, Ardmore, and Haverford. In Haverford, Conestoga Road then follows Old Lancaster Road in Bryn Mawr where it is briefly concurrent with Lancaster Avenue (then called “the turnpike”) and follows Old Lancaster Road again past the Bryn Mawr Hospital to County Line Road, where it becomes Conestoga Road. In modern day Wayne, the road merges again with Lancaster Avenue before splitting back off as East and West Conestoga Road in Devon. The road merges back onto Old Lancaster Road and eventually back to Lancaster Avenue (Lancaster Pike) near the Daylesford train station. The road today is discontinuous at this point due to the road being useless between Berwyn and East Whiteland Township where today it traverses many local roads. Conestoga Road continues as Pennsylvania Route 401 until Elverson.

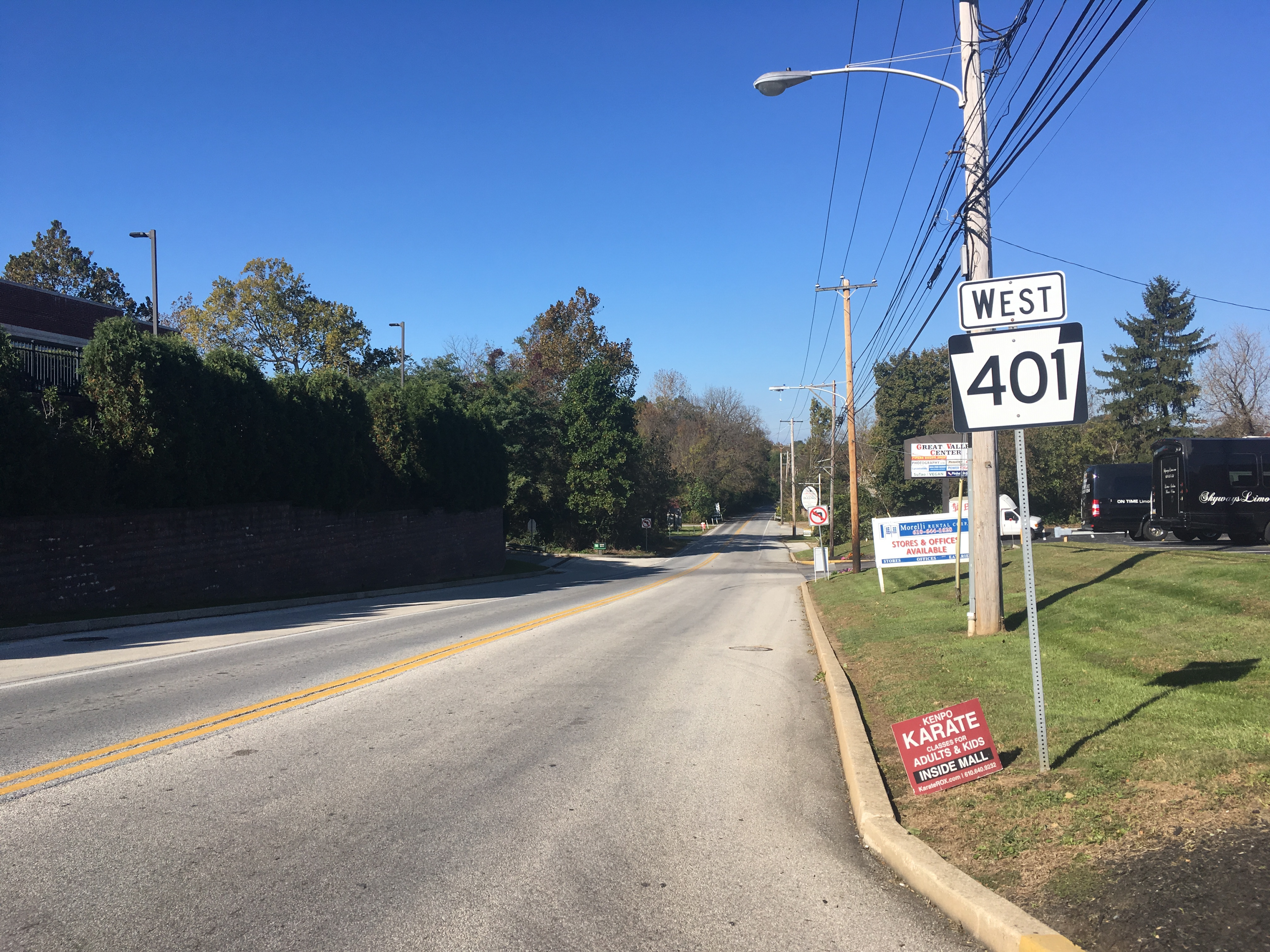
Conestoga Road as PA 401 westbound past its eastern terminus at US 30 in East Whiteland Township

From Elverson, the road continues to Harrisburg and the Allegheny Valley according to sources. As a turnpike, the road was the fourth in Pennsylvania. Routing-wise, the road bypassed the town of Lancaster.

== History ==
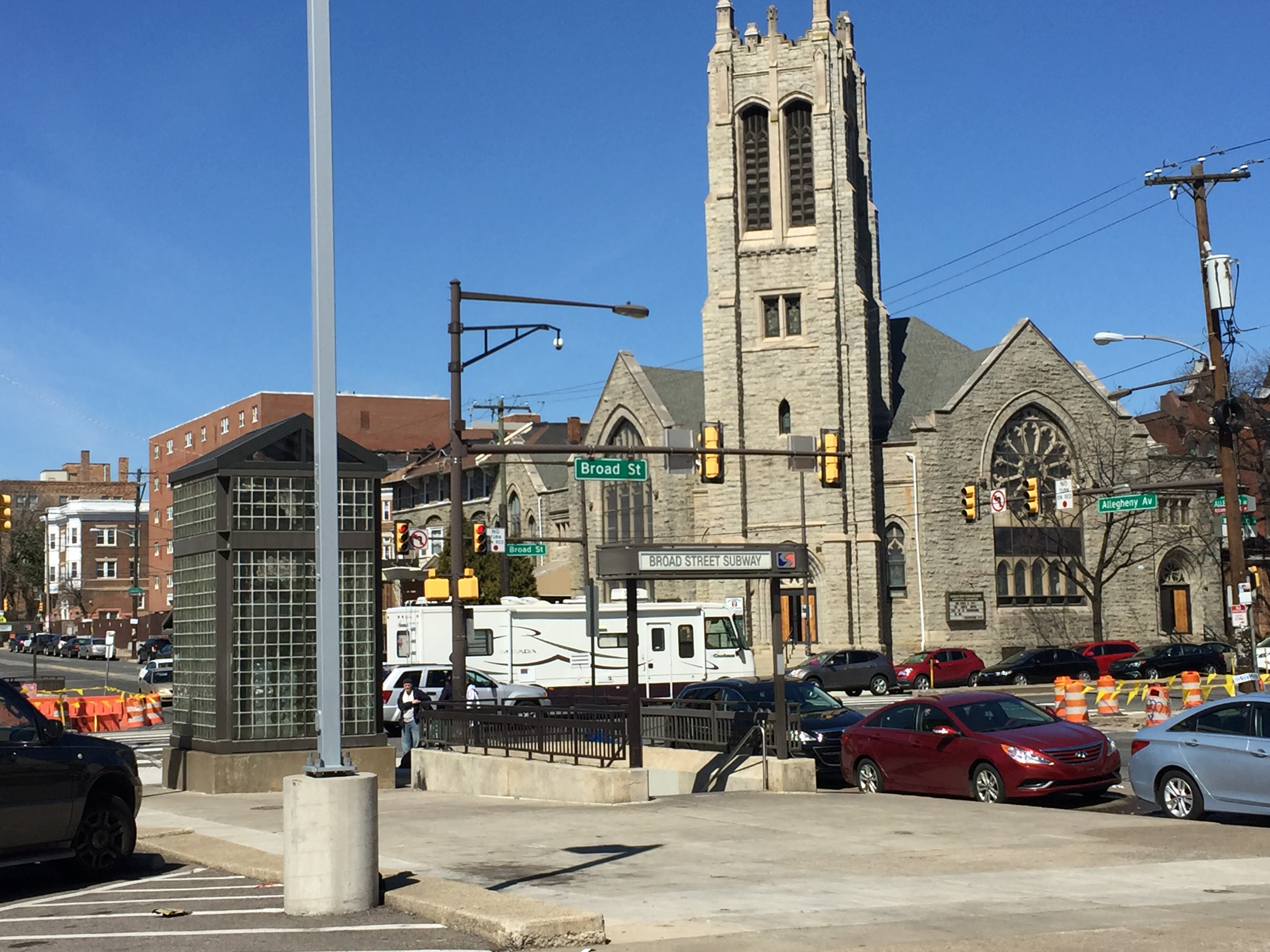
Conestoga Road in Philadelphia as Allegheny Avenue at Broad Street

The Conestoga Road dates back to 1684, when the Allegheny Path ran from Philadelphia west to the Allegheny Valley; this path became known as the Conestoga Pike or Old Conestoga Road. The path was used by the Susquehannock and other Native American tribes to trade with people in Philadelphia in the 1700s. The eastern section of the road closer to Philadelphia was improved by settlers of the Welsh Tract. A road petition was granted in 1718 to improve a portion of the road in present-day Chester County. The Conestoga Pike was incorporated in 1811 as a turnpike. The turnpike was 20 feet (6.1 m) wide to carry wagon traffic. The Little Conestoga Turnpike Company was formed in 1809 to construct a turnpike from the Lancaster Pike west to the base of the Welsh Mountains near Morgantown, where connecting turnpikes would continue west to Lancaster. The turnpike, which was built to be 60 feet (18 m) wide, was completed in 1819. The turnpike was not profitable and after 30 years the Little Conestoga Turnpike Company was disbanded and the toll gates were removed.
