= Eagle, Pennsylvania =

Unincorporated community in Pennsylvania, US

- Census-designated place
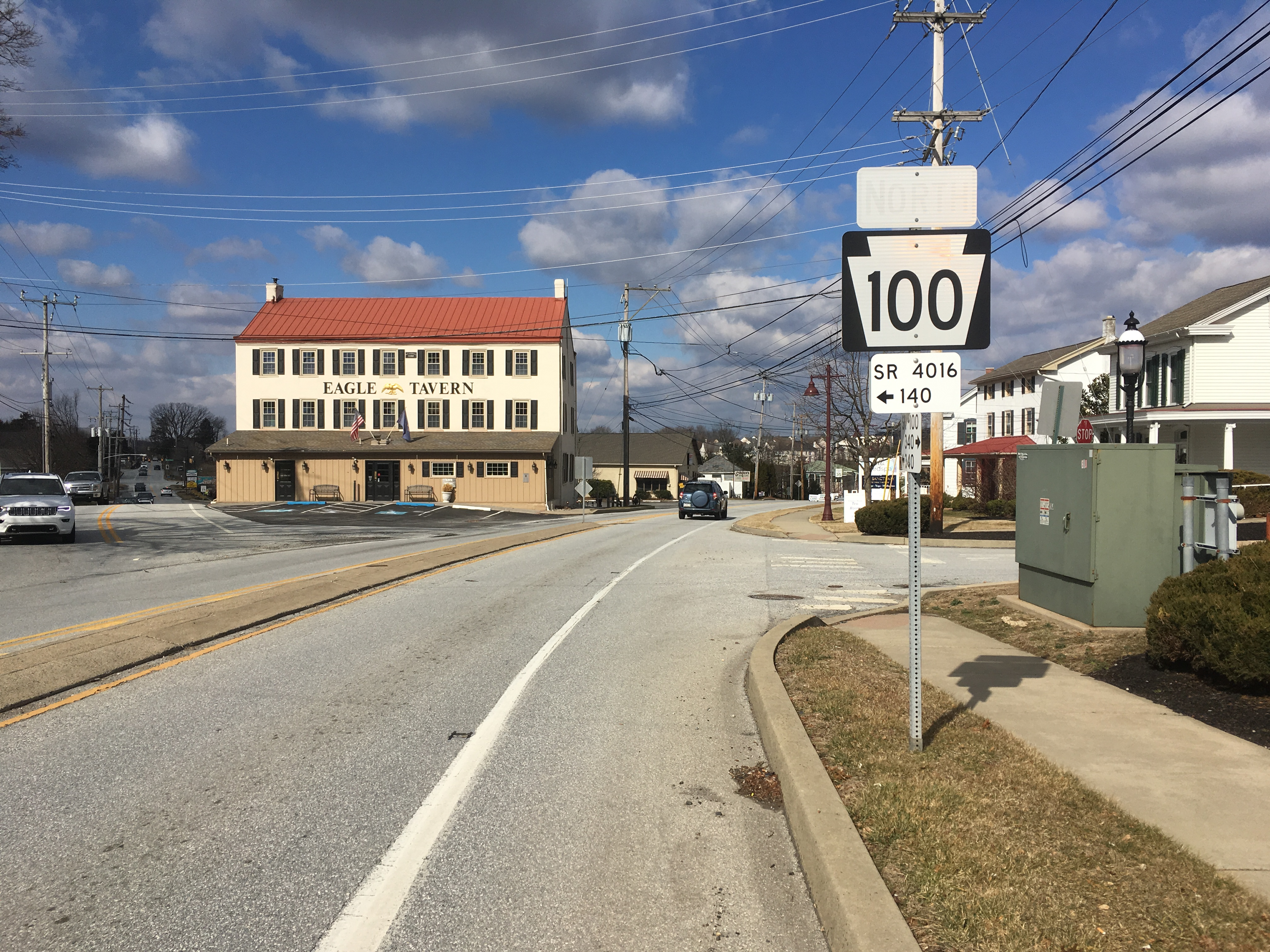
- Intersection of Pottstown Pike and Little Conestoga Road in Eagle

- Location of Eagle in Chester County, Pennsylvania (top) and of Chester County in Pennsylvania (below)

- Location of Eagle in Pennsylvania Eagle (the United States)
- Coordinates: 40°04′38″N 75°41′15″W
- Country: United States
- State: Pennsylvania
- County: Chester
- Township: Upper Uwchlan
- Elevation: 256 ft (78 m)

Population (2020)
  - Total: 498
- Time zone: UTC-5 (EST)
  - Summer (DST): UTC-4 (EDT)
- Area code: 610

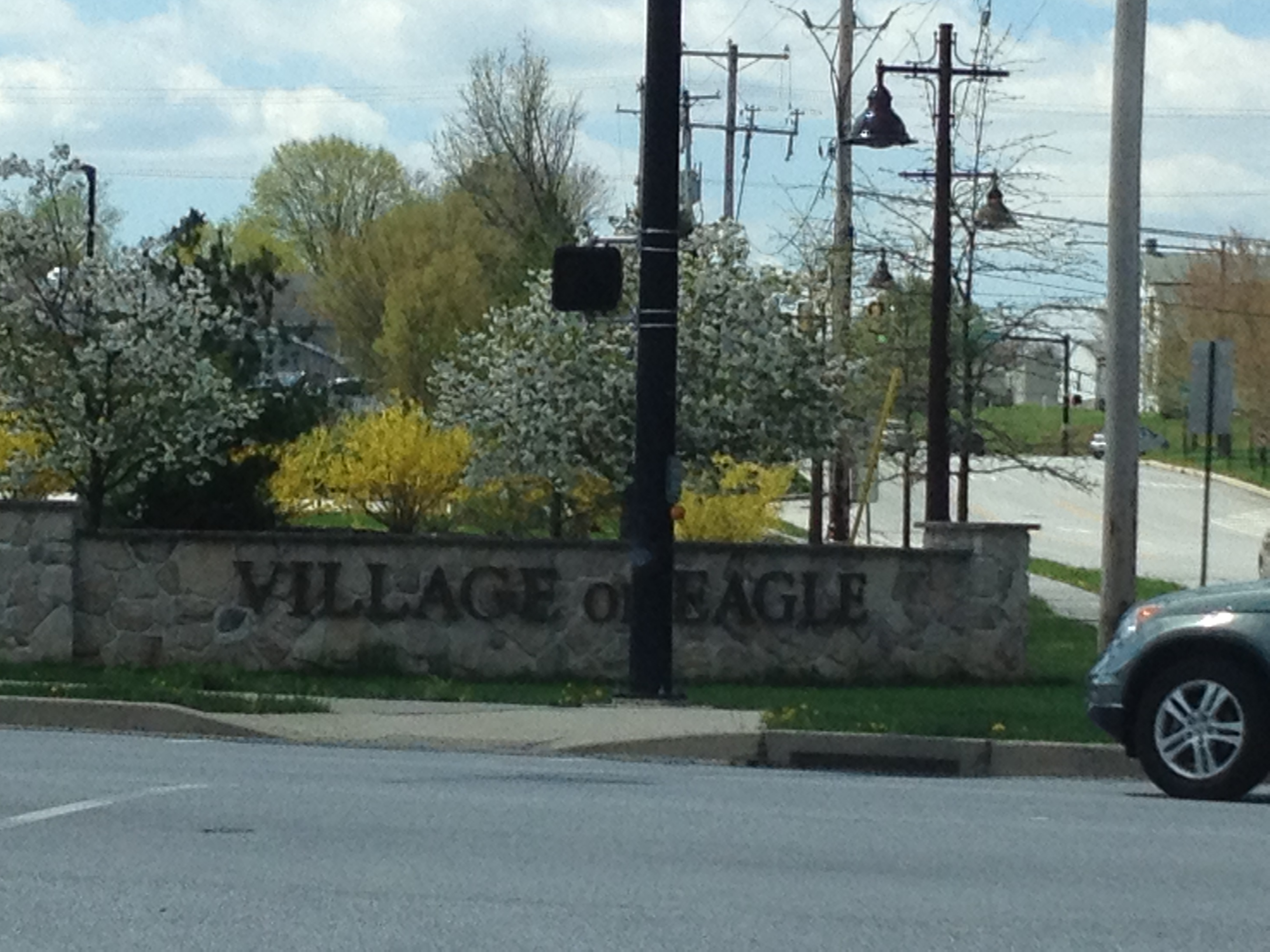
The welcome sign for Eagle at the corner of Station Blvd./Park Rd. and PA Route 100

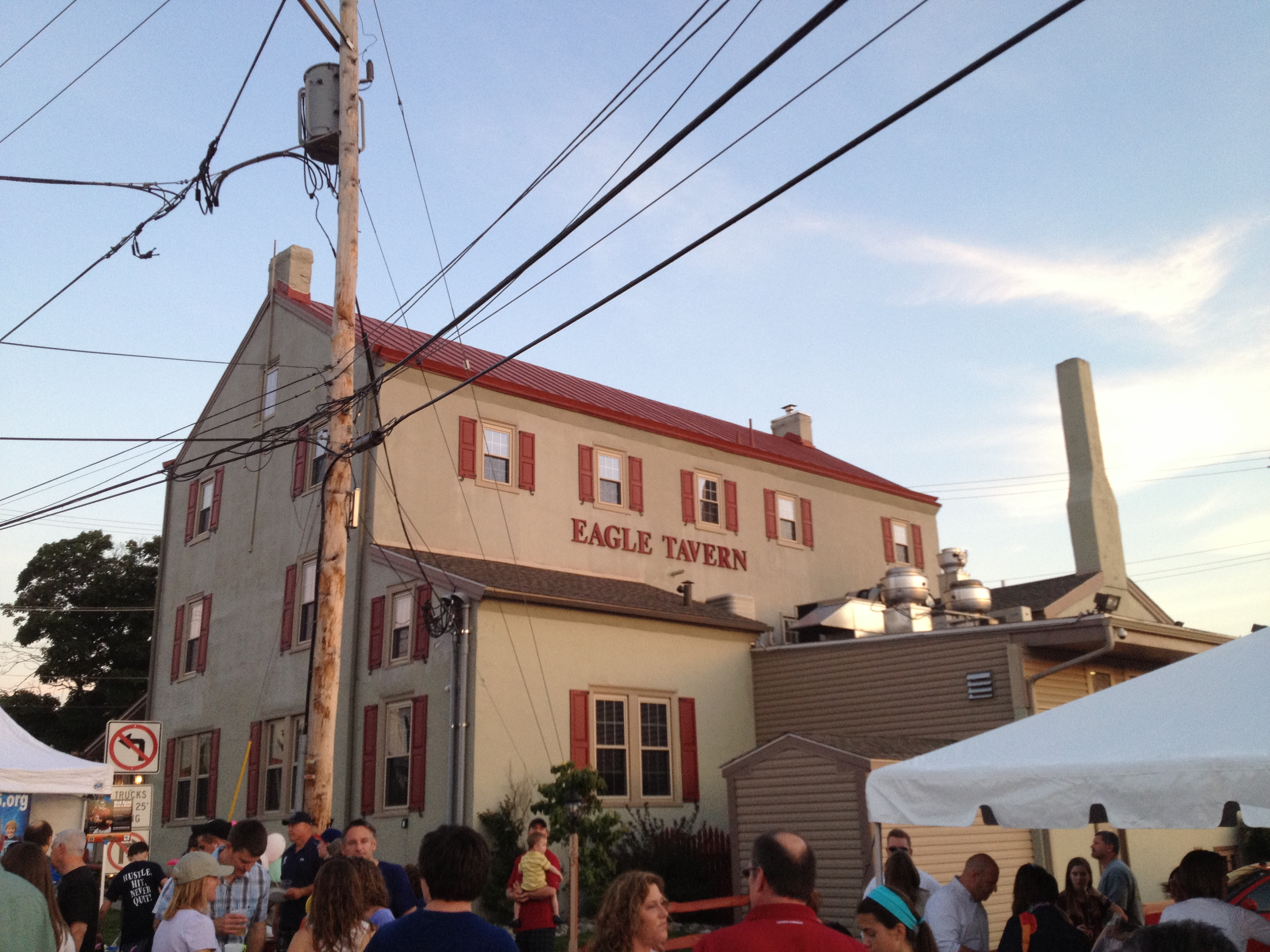
Eagle Tavern at Little Conestoga Rd. and Route 100

Eagle (also "Uwchland", "Windsor" or the "Village of Eagle") is an unincorporated community and census-designated place in Upper Uwchlan Township, Pennsylvania, United States. As of 2020, Eagle had a population of 498.

Located at 40°4′40″N 75°41′16″W, the center of the village is the intersection of Pottstown Pike (Pennsylvania Route 100) and Little Conestoga Road, where the historic Eagle Tavern is located. Eagle has recently experienced tremendous development in the surrounding areas. A bypass of Route 100 was constructed in the 2000s to reduce traffic and preserve historic structures such as the Eagle Tavern.
