= Special routes of U.S. Route 322 =

Special routes of U.S. Route 322

Highway system
- United States Numbered Highway System; List; Special; Divided

A total of at least five special routes of U.S. Route 322 currently exist.

== State College business route ==
U.S. Route 322 Business
- Location: State College, Pennsylvania
- Existed: 1985–present

U.S. Route 322 Business is a 9-mile (14 km) route following the original alignment of its parent. After the mainline of the route was shifted on to the Mount Nittany Expressway (whose western portion is now also part of Interstate 99), the business designation came into place. The entire route is known as Atherton Street, which begins in the west as a four-lane road that is mostly bordered by residential development. After passing by the southern entrance to Penn State University, the highway narrows to two lanes through the town center. West of downtown, the route is four lanes and offers a mix of periodic commercial development and more rural scenes.

== Chester County alternate truck route ==
U.S. Route 322 Alternate Truck
- Location: Caln Township, Pennsylvania–West Goshen Township, Pennsylvania
- Existed: 2025–present

U.S. Route 322 Alternate Truck (US 322 Alt. Truck) is a 9.6-mile (15.4 km) truck route of US 322 from Caln Township, Pennsylvania to West Goshen Township, Pennsylvania. The route bypasses a low-clearance underpass in West Goshen Township. The route begins at the US 322/US 30 interchange in Caln Township, then heads east along the US 30 freeway. The route exits the freeway at the US 30 interchange with PA 100 in West Whiteland Township, turning south along PA 100 and becoming a freeway before merging onto the US 202 freeway. After a brief concurrency with US 202, the route terminates at the US 202/US 322 interchange in West Goshen Township.

Major intersections

The entire route is in Chester County.

Location	mi	km	Destinations	Notes
Caln Township			US 322 – West Chester, Honey Brook US 30 west – Coatesville, Lancaster	Western terminus; west end of US 30 overlap
Downingtown			To PA 282 (Wallace Avenue)	Westbound exit and eastbound entrance; access via Norwood Road
Downingtown–East Caln Township line			PA 113 to PA 100 – Downingtown, Lionville	Eastbound exit and westbound entrance
East Caln Township			US 30 Bus. (Lancaster Avenue)	
West Whiteland Township			US 30 east – King of Prussia, Philadelphia PA 100 north (Pottstown Pike) – Exton	Eastern end of US 30 concurrency; western end of PA 100 concurrency
West Whiteland Township			Pottstown Pike	Eastbound exit and westbound entrance
West Goshen Township			PA 100 ends US 202 north – King of Prussia	Westbound exit and eastbound entrance; southern terminus of PA 100; eastern end of US 202 concurrency
West Goshen Township			US 202 south / US 322 east – West Chester	Eastern terminus
1.000 mi = 1.609 km; 1.000 km = 0.621 mi: Concurrency terminus; Incomplete access

== Downingtown alternate truck route ==
U.S. Route 322 Alternate Truck
- Location: Downingtown, Pennsylvania
- Existed: 2013–present

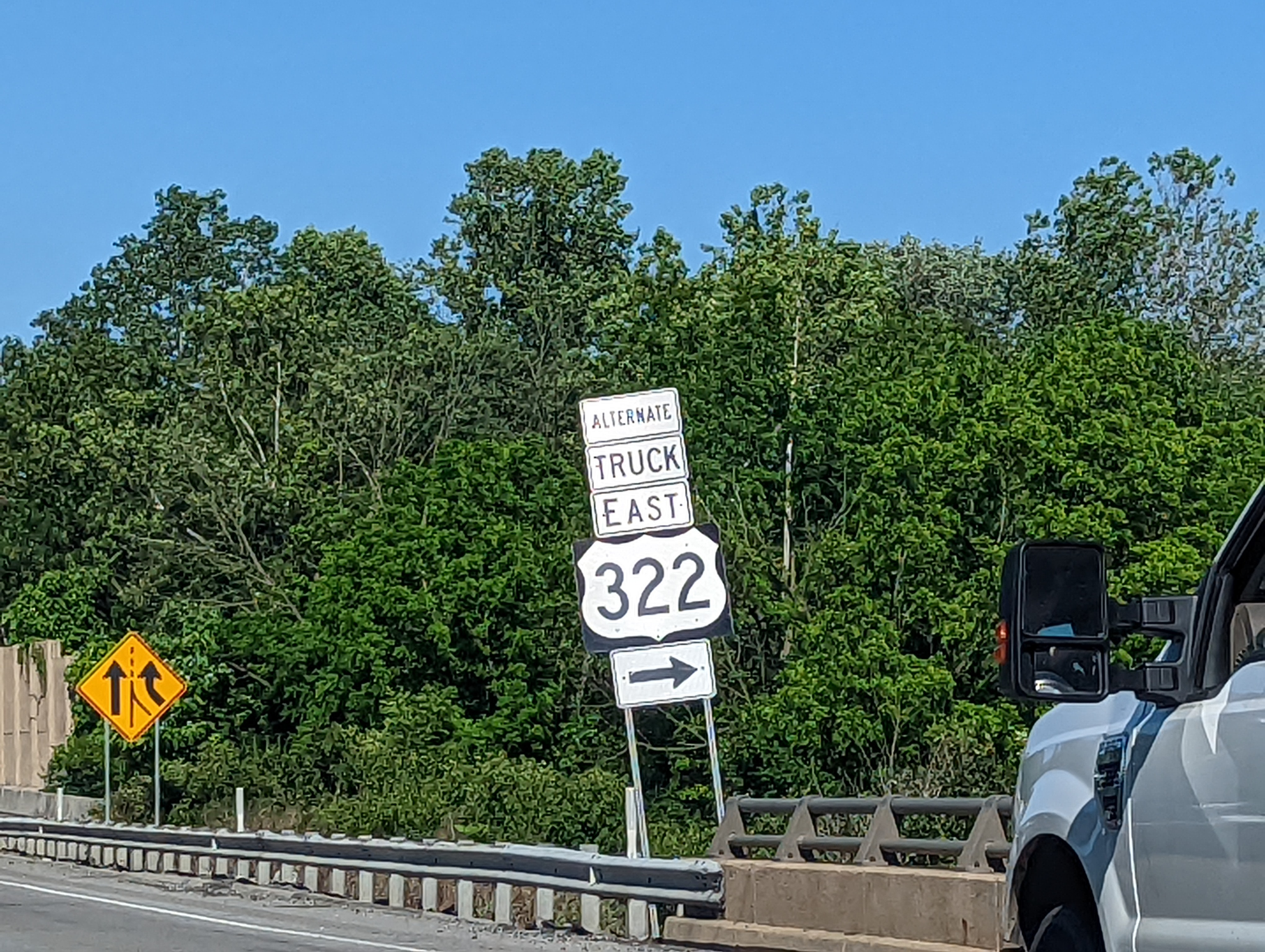
US 322 Alternate Truck eastbound leaving US 30 near Downingtown.

U.S. Route 322 Alternate Truck (US 322 Alt. Truck) is a truck route of US 322 around a weight-restricted bridge over the East Branch Brandywine Creek in Downingtown, Pennsylvania, on which trucks over 36 tons and combination loads over 40 tons are prohibited. The route follows the US 30 freeway, PA 113, and US 30 Bus./US 322 Truck. US 322 Alt. Truck runs concurrent with US 30 Bus. Alt. Truck along US 30 and PA 113.

Major intersections

The entire route is in Chester County.

Location	mi	km	Destinations	Notes
Caln Township			West end of freeway	
Caln Township			US 322 – West Chester, Honey Brook US 30 west – Coatesville, Lancaster	Western terminus; west end of US 30 overlap
Downingtown			To PA 282 (Wallace Avenue)	Westbound exit and eastbound entrance; access via Norwood Road
East Caln Township			US 30 east – Exton PA 113 north to PA 100 – Lionville	Eastbound exit and westbound entrance; east end of US 30 overlap; west end of PA 113 overlap
East Caln Township			East end of freeway	
Downingtown			US 30 Bus. east (East Lancaster Avenue) – Exton PA 113 ends	East end of PA 113 overlap; west end of US 30 Bus. overlap
Downingtown			PA 282 west (Green Street)	Eastern terminus of PA 282
Downingtown			US 322 east (Brandywine Avenue)	
Downingtown			US 322 west / US 30 Bus. west (East Lancaster Avenue)	Continuation west
1.000 mi = 1.609 km; 1.000 km = 0.621 mi: Concurrency terminus; Incomplete access

== Downingtown truck route ==
U.S. Route 322 Truck
- Location: Downingtown, Pennsylvania
- Existed: 2002–present

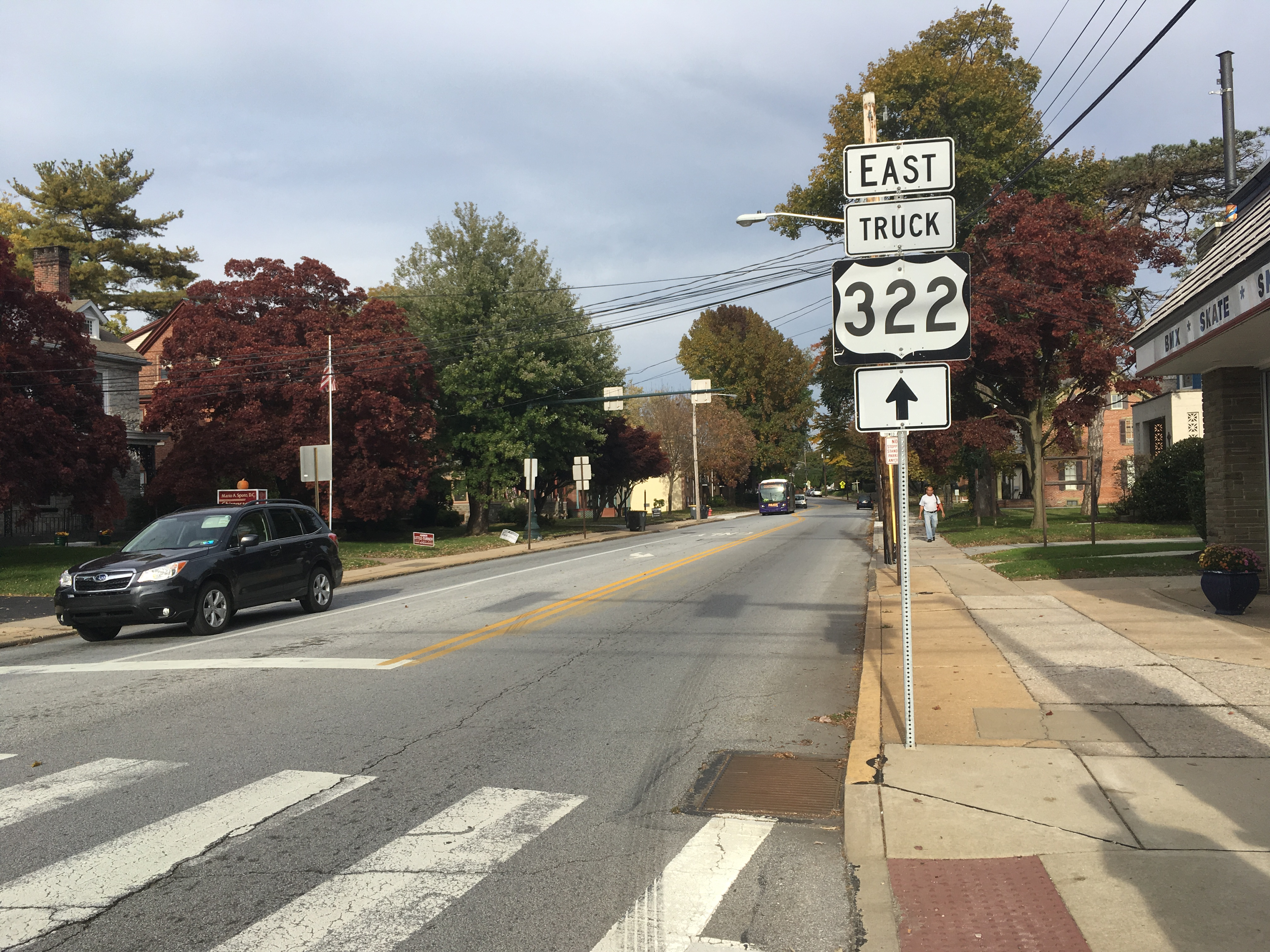
US 322 Truck eastbound concurrent with US 30 Bus. eastbound past PA 282 in Downingtown

U.S. Route 322 Truck is a 4.5-mile (7.2 km) bypass of Downingtown, Pennsylvania that provides a route for trucks around a low-clearance underpass. The route travels east from the mainline along U.S. Route 30 Business (Lancaster Avenue), which is lined with shopping centers. It then turns south onto Quarry Road near an interchange with U.S. Route 30, and travels west past industrial development on Boot Road.

Major intersections

The entire route is in Chester County.

Location	mi	km	Destinations	Notes
Downingtown			US 322 west (East Lancaster Avenue) / US 30 Bus. west	Continuation west; west end of US 30 Bus. overlap
Downingtown			US 322 east (Brandywine Avenue)	
Downingtown			PA 282 west (Green Street)	Eastern terminus of PA 282
Downingtown			PA 113 north (West Uwchlan Avenue) to Penna Turnpike	Southern terminus of PA 113
East Caln Township			US 30 Bus. east (Lancaster Avenue) to US 30 west	East end of US 30 Bus. overlap
East Caln Township			US 30 east – King of Prussia	Interchange; access to and from US 30 east
Downingtown			US 322 (Brandywine Avenue)	Eastern terminus
1.000 mi = 1.609 km; 1.000 km = 0.621 mi: Concurrency terminus; Incomplete access

== West Chester business route ==
U.S. Route 322 Business
- Location: West Chester, Pennsylvania
- Length: 3.229 mi (5.197 km)
- Existed: 1964–present

U.S. Route 322 Business (US 322 Bus.) is a business route of US 322 in the borough and surrounding townships of West Chester in Chester County, Pennsylvania. US 322 bypasses West Chester to the north and east on the West Chester Bypass while US 322 Bus. heads through the downtown area. The business route begins at US 322 northwest of the borough and heads southeast, entering West Chester on Hannum Avenue. US 322 Bus. heads east into downtown West Chester along the one-way pair of West Market and West Chestnut streets. In the center of town, the route heads south along South High Street, passing through the West Chester University campus as it leaves the borough. US 322 Bus. comes to its eastern terminus at an interchange with US 202/US 322 at the southern terminus of the bypass.

In the 1920s, the current routing of US 322 Bus. was designated PA 5 heading northwest of West Chester and US 122/PA 29 (later US 202) along High Street. In the 1930s, US 322 was designated to run through the borough along Hannum Avenue, Gay Street, and High Street, replacing PA 5 and running concurrent with US 202. US 322 was moved to a bypass of West Chester in the 1950s, and US 322 Bus. was assigned to the former alignment of the route through the borough. US 202 was moved to the bypass by 1970, eliminating the concurrency it had with US 322 Bus. The concurrent PA 100 designation along High Street between downtown and PA 52 was removed in 2003.

== Mullica Hill business route ==
U.S. Route 322 Business
- Location: Mullica Hill, New Jersey
- Length: 1.47 mi (2.37 km)
- Existed: 2012–present

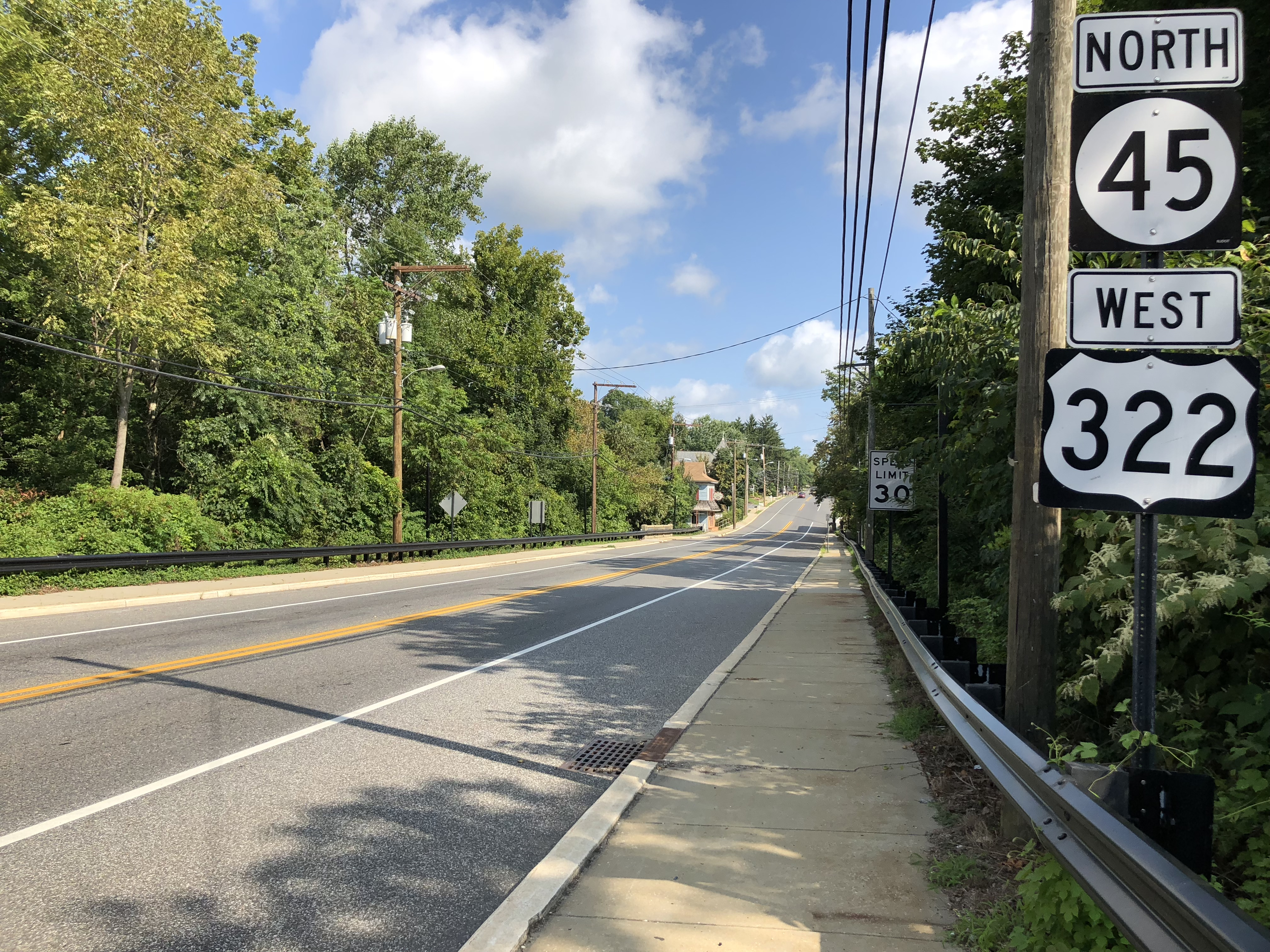
View west along US 322 Bus. and north along Route 45 just northwest of their junction in Mullica Hill

U.S. Route 322 Business (US 322 Bus.) is a 1.47-mile (2.37 km) business route following the former alignment of US 322 through the community of Mullica Hill in Harrison Township, Gloucester County, New Jersey. The route begins at an intersection with US 322/CR 536/CR 536A and Route 45 north of Mullica Hill, heading south concurrent with Route 45/CR 536 on two-lane undivided Main Street. The road passes homes and some businesses in the community. In the center of Mullica Hill, US 322 Bus./CR 536 splits from Route 45 by heading east on Mullica Road and then turns right onto Mullica Hill Road. The route continues through a mix of woods, fields, and residential subdivisions. US 322 Bus. reaches its eastern terminus at an intersection with US 322/CR 536A and CR 623, at which point Mullica Hill Road continues east as US 322/CR 536. US 322 Bus. is county-maintained its entire length and is unsigned. US 322 Bus. was created following the rerouting of US 322 onto the Mullica Hill Bypass in 2012.

Major intersections

The entire route is in Harrison Township, Gloucester County.

mi	km	Destinations	Notes
0.00	0.00	US 322 (Swedesboro Road) / Route 45 north to Route 55 – Commodore Barry Bridge, Bridgeport, Shore Points, Glassboro, Woodbury	US 322 is unsigned CR 536 west / CR 536A east; western terminus of Route 45 / CR 536 overlap
0.38	0.61	Route 45 south to Route 77 – Woodstown, Salem	Eastern terminus of Route 45 overlap
1.47	2.37	US 322 (Mullica Hill Road) – Richwood, Jefferson	US 322 is unsigned CR 536A west / CR 536 east; eastern terminus of CR 536 overlap
1.000 mi = 1.609 km; 1.000 km = 0.621 mi: Concurrency terminus

== See also ==
- List of special routes of the United States Numbered Highway System
