= List of U.S. Routes in Pennsylvania =

United States Numbered Highways of the Pennsylvania State Route System
- Route markers for U.S. Route 6, U.S. Route 30, and U.S. Route 322

System information
- Notes: All routes are assigned State Route (SR X) numbers, usually corresponding to the signed numbers. U.S. Routes are generally state-maintained.

Highway names
- US Highways: U.S. Route X (US X)
- Special Routes: U.S. Route X Alternate (US X Alt.); U.S. Route X Alternate Truck (US X Alt. Truck); U.S. Route X Business (US X Bus.); U.S. Route X Bypass (US X Byp.); U.S. Route X Truck (US X Truck)

System links
- Pennsylvania State Route System; Interstate; US; State; Scenic; Legislative

In the U.S. state of Pennsylvania, U.S. Routes are maintained by the Pennsylvania Department of Transportation (PennDOT).

== Mainline highways ==
Number	Length (mi)	Length (km)	Southern or western terminus	Northern or eastern terminus	Formed	Removed	Notes
US 1	81	130	US 1 near Nottingham	US 1 at Morrisville	1926	current	
US 6	403	649	US 6 near North Richmond, OH	US 6 at Port Jervis, NY	1926	current	
US 6N	21.04	33.86	Erie	Union City	1931	1935	Now PA 97 (north)
US 6N	28	45	US 20 in Springfield Township	US 6/US 19 in LeBoeuf Township	1935	current	
US 11	248	399	US 11 at Antrim Township	US 11 at Great Bend Township	1926	current	
US 13	49	79	US 13 at Marcus Hook, Pennsylvania	US 1 in Falls Township	1926	current	
US 15	195	314	US 15 near Gettysburg	US 15 near Lawrenceville	1926	current	
US 19	188	303	US 19 at Perry Township	US 20 in Erie	1925	current	
US 20	45	72	US 20 near West Springfield	US 20 near North East	1926	current	
US 22	338	544	US 22 at Hanover Township	US 22 at the Easton-Phillipsburg Toll Bridge in Easton	1926	current	
US 30	324	521	US 30 at Greene Township	US 30 at the Benjamin Franklin Bridge in Philadelphia	1913	current	
US 40	83	134	US 40 at Donegal Township	US 40 at Addison Township	1926	current	
US 46	1	1.6	US 611 at Portland	US 46 at Delaware River near Portland	1936	1954	Temporarily replaced by US 611
US 62	119	192	Ohio border in Sharon	New York border in Pine Grove Township	1932	current	
US 106	87	140	US 309 at Wyalusing	US 106 border near Darbytown	1928	1972	Now PA 106, PA 652, and PA 706
US 111	50	80	US 111 at Shrewsbury	US 22 in Progress	1928	1953	Replaced by I-83
US 119	133	214	US 119 at Springhill Township	US 219 in Sandy Township	1926	current	
US 120	104	167	US 219/PA 948 in Ridgway	US 220 in Lock Haven	1926	1967	Now PA 120
US 122	91	146	US 11/US 15 in Sunbury	PA 23 in Morgantown	1935	1963	Now PA 10 and PA 61
US 140	12	19	US 15 in Gettysburg	US 140 near Littlestown	1928	1979	Now PA 97 (south)
US 202	59	95	US 202 at Bethel Township	US 202 near New Hope	1935	current	
US 206	0.4	0.64	US 209 in Milford	US 206 at Delaware River near Milford	1934	current	
US 209	146	235	PA 147 in Millersburg	US 209 at Matamoras	1926	current	
US 219	207	333	US 219 near Salisbury	US 219 border near Limestone, NY	1926	current	
US 220	248	399	US 220 in Cumberland Valley Township	I-86/NY 17 in South Waverly	1926	current	NY 17 is briefly in Pennsylvania in the borough of South Waverly
US 222	90	140	US 222 in Fulton Township	I-78/PA 222/PA 309 in Dorneyville, PA	1926	current	
US 224	10	16	US 224 in Mahoning Township	PA 18 in New Castle	1933	current	
US 230	40	64	US 22 in Harrisburg	US 30 in Lancaster	1928	1967	Now PA 230 and PA 283
US 309	138	222	US 611 in Philadelphia	US 6 in Tunkhannock	1926	1968	Now PA 309 and PA 29 (north)
US 322	370	600	US 322 at West Shenango Township	US 322 at Chester	1926	current	
US 422	113	182	US 422 at Pulaski Township	US 219 in Cambria Township	1926	current	
US 422	88	142	US 322 in Derry Township	US 202 in Tredyffrin Township	1927	current	
US 522	128	206	US 522 near Warfordsburg	US 11/US 15 in Selinsgrove	1943	current	
US 611	124	200	PA 291 in Philadelphia	I-81 in Scranton	1926	1972	Now PA 611 and PA 435
US 622	55	89	US 622 at Thompson Township	US 22 in Mount Union	1927	1928	Now PA 928 and US 522
US 711	97	156	US 11 in Northumberland	New York in South Waverly	1927	1928	Replaced by PA 147, PA 405, and US 220
Former

== Auxiliary routes ==
Number	Length (mi)	Length (km)	Southern or western terminus	Northern or eastern terminus	Formed	Removed	Notes
US 1 Bus.	8	13	US 1 in Oxford	US 1 in Falls Township	1989	current	Original route of US 1 that was replaced by an expressway
US 6 Bus.	4	6.4	US 6 in Warren	US 6 in Mead Township	1989	current	Original route of US 6 that was replaced by a bypass on the south side of the Allegheny River
US 6 Bus.	2	3.2	US 6 in Tunkhannock Township	US 6 in Tunkhannock	2000	current	Original route of US 6 through downtown Tunkhannock that was replaced by a wider bypass
US 6 Bus.	14	23	I-81/US 6/US 11 in Scranton	US 6 in Carbondale Township	1999	current	Original route of US 6 that was replaced by an expressway
US 13 Bus.	3	4.8	US 13/PA 291 in Trainer	US 13 in Chester	2022	current	Created when US 13 was rerouted to improve truck traffic
US 15 Bus.	14	23	Maryland state line in Freedom Township	US 15/PA 394 in Straban Township	1964	current	Original route of US 15 that was replaced by an expressway
US 15 Bus.	4	6.4	US 15/PA 660 in Richmond Township	US 15 in Richmond Township	2005	current	Original route of US 15 through downtown Mansfield that was replaced by an expressway
US 19 Truck	19.5	31.4	US 19 in Mount Lebanon	US 19 in McCandless	1946	current	
US 22 Bus.	5	8.0	US 22 / I-376 in Churchill	US 22 / I-376 in Monroeville	1963	current	Original route of US 22 in Monroeville, changed to business route when the main route was added to I-376
US 22 Bus.	5	8.0	US 22/US 522 in Granville Township	US 22/US 322 in Derry Township	2005	current	Original route of US 22 through downtown Lewistown that was replaced by an expressway
US 30 Bus.	3	4.8	US 30 in Bedford Township	US 30 in Bedford Township	1970	current	Original route of US 30 through downtown Bedford that was replaced by an expressway
US 30 Bus.	2	3.2	US 30 in Everett	US 30 in West Providence Township	1982	current	Original route of US 30 through downtown Everett that was replaced by an expressway
US 30 Bus.	19	31	US 30 in Sadsbury Township	US 30/US 202 in Glenloch	1963	current	Original route of US 30 in Chester County designated as a business route in several segments as expressway was extended
US 30 Bus. Alt. Truck	4	6.4	US 30 Bus./US 322 in Downingtown	US 30 Bus./PA 113 in Downingtown	2013	current	Designated to bypass a weight-restricted bridge over East Branch Brandywine Creek
US 40 Bus.	2	3.2	US 40 in Redstone Township	US 40 in Redstone Township	2009	current	Designated when a segment of the original US Route was realigned to provide access to the PA 43 expressway
US 40 Bus.	5	8.0	US 40/US 119 in Uniontown	US 40 in Hopwood	1993	current	Original route of US 40 through Uniontown that was replaced by an expressway
US 62 Bus.	4	6.4	US 62 in Sharon	US 62 in Hermitage	1958	current	Original route of US 62 that was replaced by a wider parallel route
US 202 Truck	0.4	0.64	US 202 in Norristown	US 202 in Norristown	—	—	Designated to bypass a truck-restricted district
US 202 Alt. Truck	6	9.7	US 202 in Whitpain Township	US 202/PA 63 near North Wales	2013	current	Original route of US 202 that was replaced by an expressway
US 202 Bus.	9	14	PA 611 near Doylestown	US 202 near Montgomeryville	2015	current	Original route of US 202 through Montgomeryville and Doylestown that was replaced by an expressway
US 209 Bus.	14	23	US 209 in Sciota	US 209 near Marshalls Creek	1962	current	Original route of US 209 through the Stroudsburg area, designated when main route was moved onto expressways and a new two-lane segment east of the city
US 219 Bus.	4	6.4	US 219 in Summit Township	US 219 in Summit Township	1999	current	Original route of US 219 through Meyersdale that was replaced by an expressway
US 219 Alt.	23	37	US 219 in Carrolltown	US 219 in Mahaffey	—	—	Proposed in 2009 to alleviate traffic on US 219 but not yet signed; to be mostly concurrent with PA 36
US 219 Truck	3	4.8	US 219 near Ridgway	PA 120 in Ridgway	1990	current	One-way only (northbound)
US 220 Bus.	12	19	US 220 in Bedford Township	I-99/US 220/PA 56 in Cessna	1973	current	Former route of US 220 through the Bedford area that was replaced by an expressway
US 220 Bus.	37	60	I-99/US 220 near Sproul	I-99/US 220 in Bald Eagle	1996	current	Former route of US 220 in Blair County that was replaced by an expressway
US 220 Alt.	22	35	I-99/US 220 near Port Matilda	I-80/I-99/US 220/PA 26 in Spring Township	2002	current	Former route of US 220 in Centre County that was replaced by an expressway; partially concurrent with I-80
US 222 Bus.	12	19	US 222 in Cumru Township	US 222 in Ontelaunee Township	1977	current	Former route of US 222 through the Reading area that was replaced by multiple expressways
US 322 Bus.	9	14	I-99/US 220/US 322 near State College	US 322 near Boalsburg	1985	current	Former route of US 322 through State College and Boalsburg that was replaced by an expressway
US 322 Truck	4	6.4	US 30 Bus./US 322 in Downingtown	US 30 Bus./PA 113 in Downingtown	2013	current	Designated to bypass a weight-restricted bridge over East Branch Brandywine Creek
US 322 Bus.	3	4.8	US 322 in East Bradford Township	US 220/US 322 in West Goshen Township	1964	current	Former route of US 322 through West Chester that was replaced by multiple expressways
US 422 Bus.	7	11	US 422 in Union Township	US 422 in Shenango Township	1977	current	Former route of US 422 through New Castle that was replaced by an expressway
US 422 Bus.	5	8.0	US 422/PA 28/PA 268 in East Franklin Township	US 422/PA 28/PA 66 in Manor Township	2001	current	Former route of US 422 through the Kittanning area that was replaced by an expressway
US 422 Bus.	7	11	US 422 in White Township	US 119 in White Township	1997	current	Partially follows a former route of US 422 south of Indiana
US 422 Bus.	7	11	US 222/US 422 in Wyomissing	US 422 in Reiffton	1964	current	Former route of US 422 through the Reading area that was replaced by multiple expressways
