= Philadelphia and Lancaster Turnpike =

Highway in Pennsylvania, United States

Coordinates: 40.0367°N 76.3122°W

Route information
- Maintained by PennDOT
- Length: 73.33 mi (118.01 km) Route to Columbia included (10.86 mi)
- Existed: 1792–present
- Component highways: Lincoln Highway from Columbia to Lower Merion; PA 462 from Columbia to Lancaster PA 23 in Lancaster US 30 from Lancaster to Sadsbury Township US 30 Bus. from Sadsbury Township to East Whiteland Township; US 30 from East Whiteland Township to Philadelphia • SR 3012 and SR 3005 in Philadelphia • Lancaster Walk (a pedestrian walkway) at Drexel University campus between 34th and Market Streets

Major junctions
- West end: PA 462 in Columbia
- East end: PA 3 in Philadelphia

Location
- Country: United States
- State: Pennsylvania
- Counties: Lancaster, Chester, Delaware, Montgomery, Philadelphia

Highway system
- Pennsylvania State Route System; Interstate; US; State; Scenic; Legislative

Pennsylvania Historical Marker
- Designated: November 20, 1999

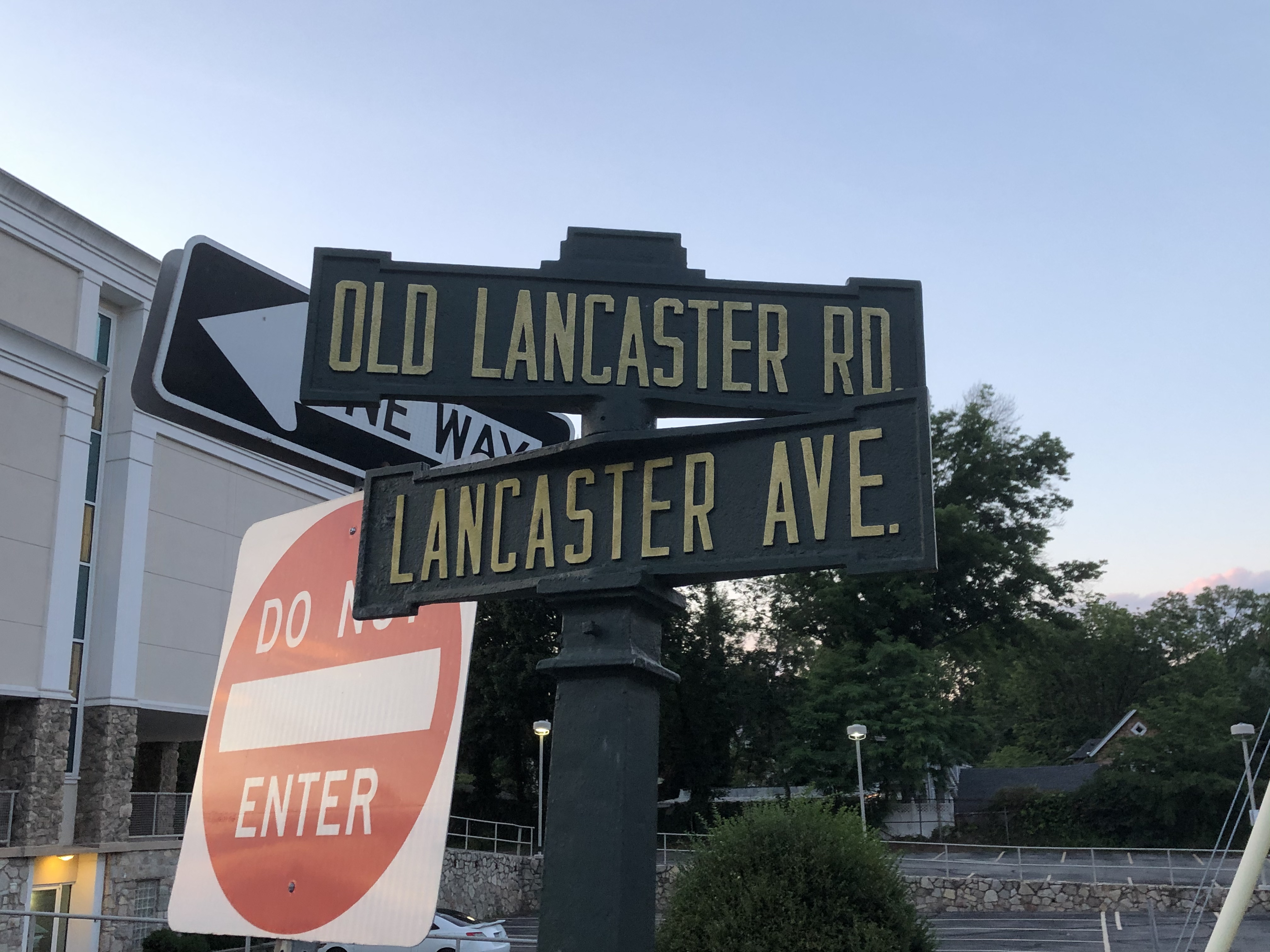
Old Lancaster Road and Lancaster Avenue in Lower Merion Township

The Philadelphia and Lancaster Turnpike, first used in 1795, is the first long-distance paved road built in the United States, according to engineered plans and specifications. It links Lancaster, Pennsylvania, and Philadelphia at 34th Street, stretching for sixty-two miles. It was later extended by the Lancaster and Susquehanna Turnpike to the Susquehanna River in Columbia. The route is now designated Pennsylvania Route 462 from the western terminus to US 30 just southeast of Lancaster, at which point US 30 (and US 30 Business in Chester County) follows the route to Philadelphia, with this stretch of the roadway commonly known as Lancaster Avenue or Lancaster Pike. The US 30 portion ends at Girard Avenue in the Parkside neighborhood of Philadelphia, where State Route 3012 is designated on the road to Belmont Avenue. At Belmont Avenue, the road changes designation to State Route 3005 and runs to the eastern terminus at 34th Street. Historically, Lancaster Pike terminated at Market Street before Drexel University took over the stretch between 32nd and 34th Streets and turned the road into a pedestrian walkway known as Lancaster Walk.

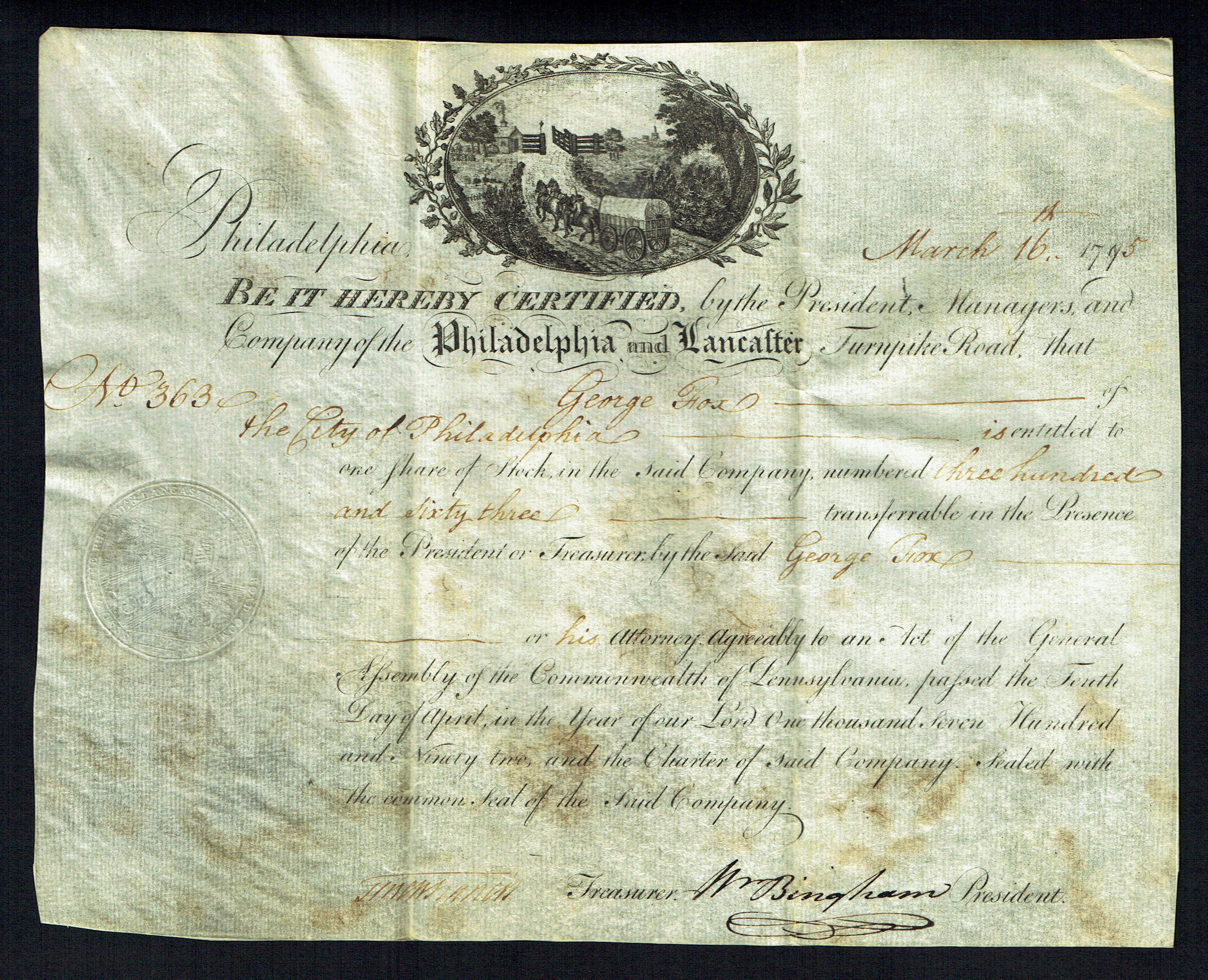
Share of the "Company of the Lancaster and Turnpike Road", issued 16 March 1795

It was the first turnpike of importance, and because the Commonwealth of Pennsylvania could not afford to pay for its construction, it was privately built by the Philadelphia and Lancaster Turnpike Road Company, making it an early example of a public-private partnership for American infrastructure. Credited as the country's first engineered road, its ground was broken in 1792. By the 1840s, the use of railroads and canals dealt a serious blow to the companies who specialized in the manufacture of wagons and coaches. During the next fifty years, the road suffered from lack of use and maintenance, but later saw recovery with the invention of the automobile.

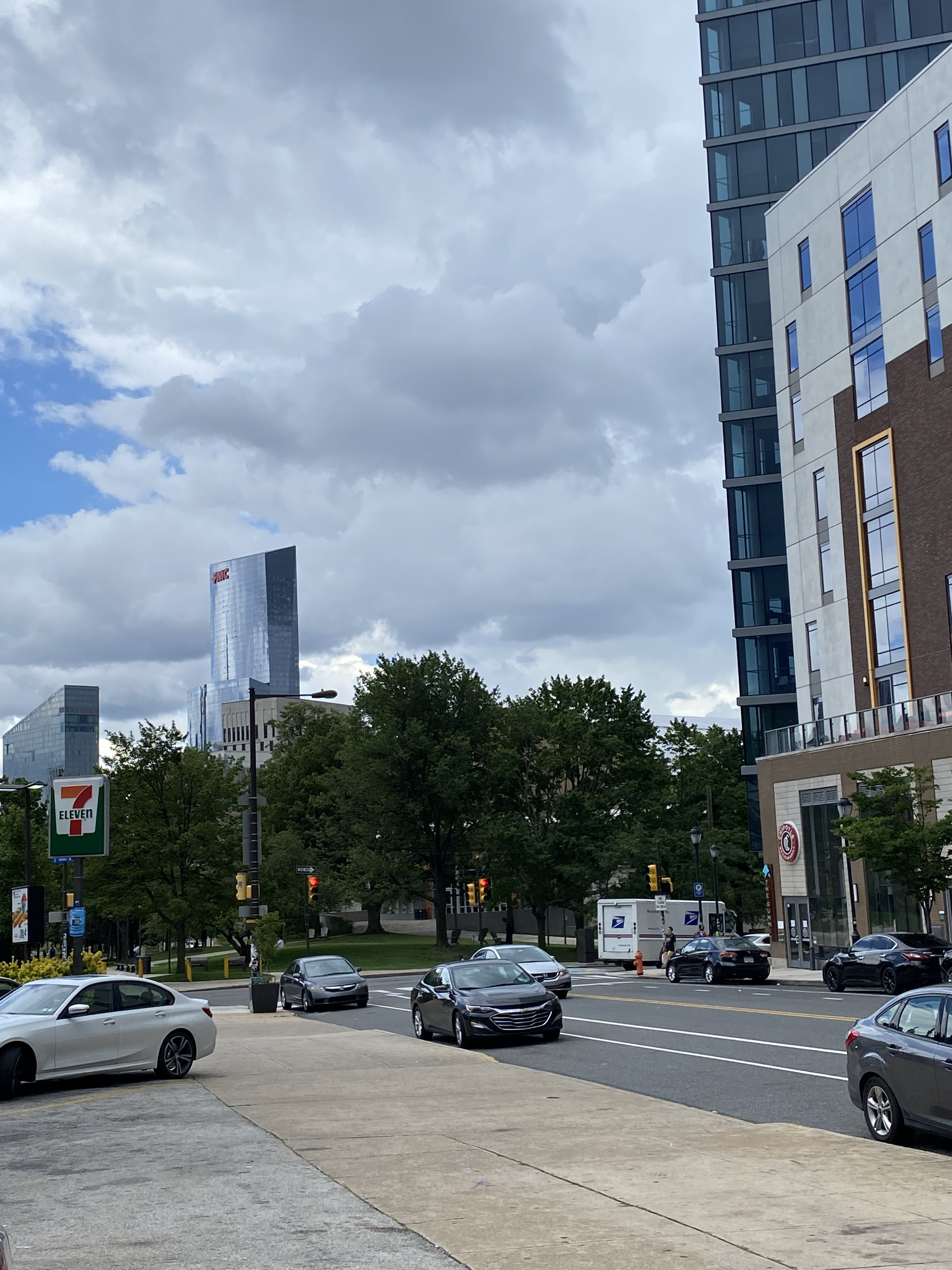
Near the end at 34th Street. Lancaster Avenue ends as a road, but continues as the “Lancaster Walk” pedestrian walkway on the campus of Drexel University

In 1876, the parallel Pennsylvania Railroad bought the turnpike from 52nd Street in Philadelphia west to Paoli for $20,000 (equal to $604,688 today) to prevent competing streetcar companies from building along it. In 1913, the turnpike became part of the transcontinental Lincoln Highway, and tolls continued to be collected until 1917, when the State Highway Department bought it for $165,000, equal to $4,146,429 today. In 1926 it was designated as part of U.S. Route 30 along with the rest of the original United States Numbered Highways.

== Major intersections ==
County	Location	mi	km	Destinations	Notes
Lancaster	Columbia	0.00	0.00	PA 462 west (Chestnut Street) – Wrightsville	Continuation west into Wrightsville on the Columbia-Wrightsville Bridge
Lancaster	Columbia	0.00	0.00	North 3rd Street to PA 441 – Washington Boro, Marietta	
Lancaster	Lancaster Township	7.73	12.44	PA 741 (Rorherstown Road / Millersville Road) – East Petersburg, New Danville	
Lancaster	Lancaster	9.76	15.71	PA 23 west (College Avenue)	West end of PA 23 westbound overlap
Lancaster	Lancaster	10.48	16.87	PA 999 west (Manor Street)	Eastern terminus of PA 999; eastbound access only
Lancaster	Lancaster	10.74	17.28	US 222 south / PA 272 south (Prince Street)	Southbound one-way pair of US 222/PA 272
Lancaster	Lancaster	10.86	17.48	PA 72 north (Queen Street)	Northbound one-way PA 72
Lancaster	Lancaster	11.10	17.86	US 222 south / PA 272 north (Lime Street)	Northbound one-way pair of US 222/PA 272
Lancaster	Lancaster	11.84	19.05	PA 23 east (Broad Street)	East end of PA 23 westbound overlap
Lancaster	Lancaster	12.74	20.50	PA 340 east (Old Philadelphia Pike)	Western terminus of PA 340
Lancaster	East Lampeter Township	14.54	23.40	US 30 west to PA 283 west – York, Harrisburg PA 462 ends	Interchange; eastern terminus of PA 462; west end of US 30 overlap
Lancaster	Ronks	17.03	27.41	PA 896 (Eastbrook Road / Hartman Bridge Road) – Strasburg	
Lancaster	Gap	25.92	41.71	PA 772 west (Newport Road)	Eastern terminus of PA 772
Lancaster	Gap	26.32	42.36	PA 41 south (Gap–Newport Pike) – Wilmington, DE	Northern terminus of PA 41
Lancaster	Gap	26.66	42.91	PA 897 north (White Horse Road)	Southern terminus of PA 897
Chester	West Sadsbury Township	31.10	50.05	PA 10 (Octorara Trail) – Honey Brook, Parkesburg	
Chester	West Sadsbury Township	31.50	50.69	US 30 east (Coatesville–Downingtown Bypass) – Coatesville, Downingtown US 30 Bus. begins	Interchange; eastbound exit and westbound entrance; east end of US 30 overlap; western terminus of US 30 Bus.
Chester	Coatesville	36.59	58.89	PA 82 south (Strode Avenue)	West end of PA 82 overlap
Chester	Coatesville	37.00	59.55	PA 82 north (North 1st Avenue) to US 30	East end of PA 82 overlap
Chester	Thorndale	41.24	66.37	PA 340 west (Bondsville Road) – Wagontown	Eastern terminus of PA 340
Chester	Downingtown	43.48	69.97	US 322 west (Manor Avenue) to US 30	West end of US 322 overlap
Chester	Downingtown	43.66	70.26	US 322 east (Brandywine Avenue) – West Chester US 322 Truck begins	East end of US 322 overlap; west end of US 322 Truck overlap
Chester	Downingtown	43.80	70.49	PA 282 west (Green Street)	Eastern terminus of PA 282
Chester	Downingtown	44.18	71.10	PA 113 north (West Uwchlan Avenue) to Penna Turnpike	Southern terminus of PA 113
Chester	East Caln Township	45.26	72.84	Quarry Road (US 322 Truck east) to US 30 east – King of Prussia	Eastern end of US 322 Truck concurrency
Chester	East Caln Township	45.41	73.08	US 30 west (Coatesville–Downingtown Bypass) – Coatesville, Lancaster	Interchange; access to and from westbound US 30
Chester	Exton	47.98	77.22	PA 100 (Pottstown Pike) to Penna Turnpike – Pottstown, West Chester	
Chester	West Whiteland Township	50.29	80.93	US 30 west (Exton Bypass) – Downingtown; US 202 – King of Prussia, West Chester US 30 Bus. ends	Interchange; eastern terminus of US 30 Bus.; west end of US 30 overlap
Chester	Frazer	51.65	83.12	PA 352 south (Sproul Road) – Chester, Immaculata University	Northern terminus of PA 352
Chester	Malvern	53.21	85.63	PA 401 west (Conestoga Road) – Elverson	Eastern terminus of PA 401
Chester	Malvern	53.62	86.29	PA 29 north (Morehall Road) to US 202 – Phoenixville	Southern terminus of PA 29
Chester	Paoli	56.14	90.35	PA 252 (Bear Hill Road / Leopard Road) – Valley Forge, Newtown Square	
Delaware	Villanova	62.93	101.28	I-476 (Mid-County Expressway) – Plymouth Meeting, Chester	Exit 13 on I-476
Delaware	Villanova	63.26	101.81	PA 320 (North Spring Mill Road / Sproul Road)	
Montgomery	No major junctions				
Delaware	No major junctions				
Montgomery–Philadelphia county line	Lower Merion Township–Philadelphia line	69.35	111.61	US 1 (City Avenue) – Bala Cynwyd, Upper Darby	
Philadelphia	Philadelphia	71.56	115.16	US 30 east (Girard Avenue); SR 3012 begins	East end of US 30 overlap; western terminus of SR 3012
Philadelphia	Philadelphia	72.00	115.87	SR 3005 (Belmont Avenue) / 44th Street; SR 3012 ends	Eastern terminus of SR 3012; west end of SR 3005 overlap
Philadelphia	Philadelphia	73.04	117.55	US 13 (Powelton Avenue)	
Philadelphia	Philadelphia	73.33	118.01	North 34th Street; SR 3005 ends	Eastern terminus of SR 3005; route transitions to pedestrian walkway called “Lancaster Walk”
Philadelphia	Philadelphia	74.33	119.62	PA 3 (Market Street)	Eastern terminus
Philadelphia	Philadelphia	1.000 mi = 1.609 km; 1.000 km = 0.621 mi: Concurrency terminus; Incomplete access; Route transition			

== See also ==
- Great Wagon Road
- Lincoln Highway
- "The Colossus", 1813 bridge
