= Pennsylvania Route 282 =

State highway in Chester County, Pennsylvania, US

Pennsylvania Route 282

Route information
- Maintained by PennDOT
- Length: 11.814 mi (19.013 km)

Major junctions
- West end: PA 82 in West Nantmeal Township
- East end: US 30 Bus. in Downingtown

Location
- Country: United States
- State: Pennsylvania
- Counties: Chester

Highway system
- Pennsylvania State Route System; Interstate; US; State; Scenic; Legislative
← PA 281	→ I-283

Pennsylvania Route 282 (PA 282) is an 11.8-mile-long (19.0 km) state highway in Chester County, Pennsylvania. First signed in 1928, the east–west route runs from PA 82 in West Nantmeal Township southeast to the intersection of Pennsylvania Avenue and Wallace Avenue in Downingtown. PA 282 follows Creek Road, a two-lane undivided road that winds along the East Branch Brandywine Creek through rural areas, for most of its length. The route passes through the communities of Glenmoore and Lyndell along the way.

== Route description ==
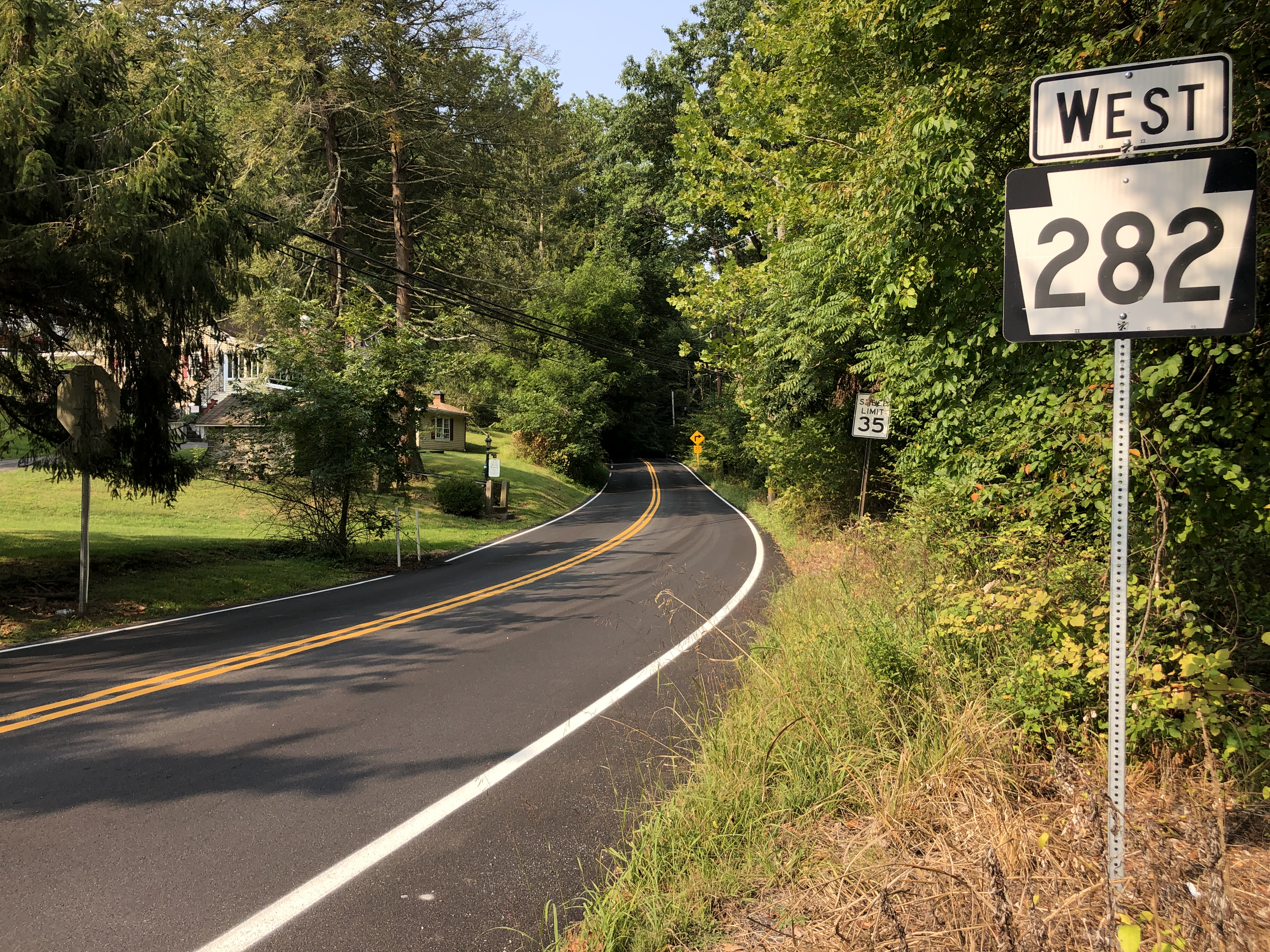
PA 282 westbound in Wallace Township

PA 282 begins at an intersection with PA 82 in West Nantmeal Township, Chester County, heading east on two-lane undivided Creek Road. The road passes through wooded areas with some fields, entering Wallace Township. Here, the route heads to the southeast and crosses the East Branch Brandywine Creek before it reaches the residential community of Glenmoore. Past here, PA 282 continues south through forested areas along the west bank of the East Branch Brandywine Creek. Near Springton Manor Farm, the road winds south before it makes a sharp turn to the northeast. The route curves to the southeast and passes to the west of Marsh Creek State Park as it enters East Brandywine Township.

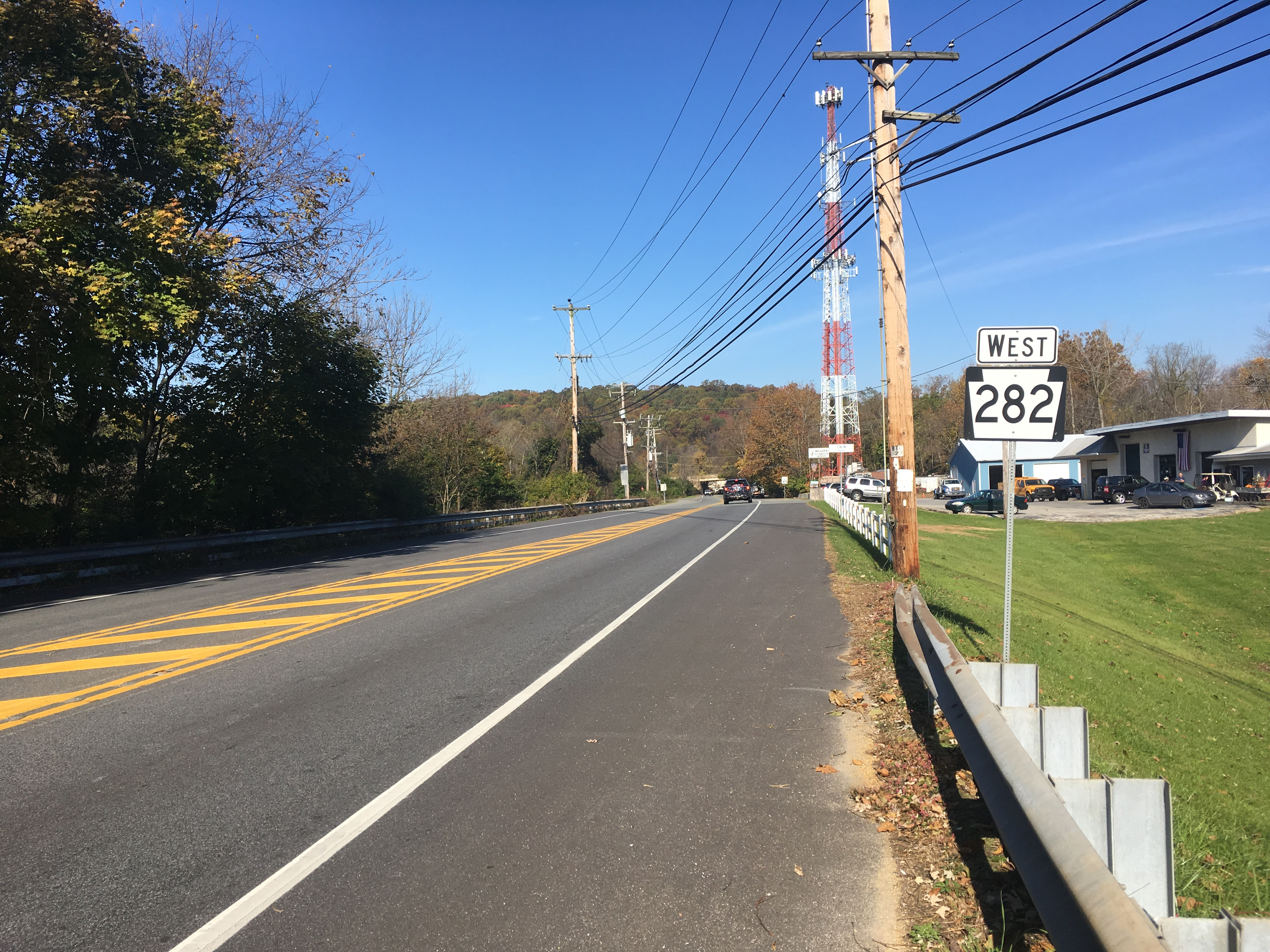
PA 282 westbound near Downingtown

Here, PA 282 runs through the community of Lyndell and continues through rural areas alongside the creek, turning to the east. The road curves northeast and then southeast as it comes to the community of Dorlan. At this point, the route curves south and continues along the west bank of the East Branch Brandywine Creek while the Struble Trail runs along the east bank. PA 282 continues south through wooded areas and crosses into Caln Township, where it passes under the US 30 freeway. The route crosses the East Branch Brandywine Creek into East Caln Township and becomes Wallace Avenue. Here, PA 282 intersects Norwood Road, which heads north to a partial interchange providing access to eastbound US 30 and from westbound US 30. The road heads into commercial areas and enters the borough of Downingtown. Here, the route turns northeast onto Pennsylvania Avenue before a turn to the southeast onto Green Street. PA 282 reaches its eastern terminus at an intersection with US 30 Bus. (Lancaster Avenue).

== History ==
When Pennsylvania first legislated routes in 1911, present-day PA 282 was not given a route number. In 1928, PA 282 was designated onto Creek Road and Wallace Avenue, running between PA 82 northwest of Glenmoore and US 30/PA 1 (now US 30 Bus.) in Downingtown. Upon designation, the entire length of the route was paved.

The eastern terminus of PA 282 was historically the intersection of Wallace Avenue and Lancaster Avenue (US 30 Bus.). However, by 2003, a segment of Wallace Avenue from Lancaster Avenue to Mill Alley was changed to a one-way street serving northbound traffic only, and the PA 282 designation was removed from this segment. According to PennDOT straight-line diagrams and highway classification maps, the route's eastern terminus is at the intersection of Wallace Avenue and Pennsylvania Avenue. However, on physical signage, the route's designation turns off of Wallace Avenue and heads northeast onto Pennsylvania Avenue, then turns southeast onto Green Street before terminating at Lancaster Avenue.

== Major intersections ==
The entire route is in Chester County.

Location	mi	km	Destinations	Notes
West Nantmeal Township	0.000	0.000	PA 82 (North Manor Road)	Western terminus
Downingtown	11.145	17.936	Norwood Road to US 30 east	
Downingtown	11.814	19.013	US 30 Bus. (East Lancaster Avenue)	Eastern terminus
1.000 mi = 1.609 km; 1.000 km = 0.621 mi

== PA 282 Alternate Truck ==
=== Downingtown ===
PA Route 282 Alternate Truck
- Location: Upper Uwchlan, Pennsylvania
- Existed: 2013–2021

Pennsylvania Route 282 Alternate Truck was a route bypassing a weight-restricted bridge over East Branch Brandywine Creek in which trucks over 30 tons and combination loads over 40 tons are prohibited. It followed PA 113, US 30, and Norwood Road. It was signed in 2013, but it was decommissioned in 2021 following a bridge repair.

=== Eagle ===
PA Route 282 Alternate Truck
- Location: Upper Uwchlan, Pennsylvania
- Existed: 2013–2019

Pennsylvania Route 282 Alternate Truck was a truck route around a weight-restricted bridge over the East Branch Brandywine Creek in Eagle, Pennsylvania. It followed Moore Road, PA 100 and PA 113. Along PA 100, it ran concurrent with PA 401 Alternate Truck. The route was signed in 2013, but it was decommissioned in 2019 following a bridge repair.

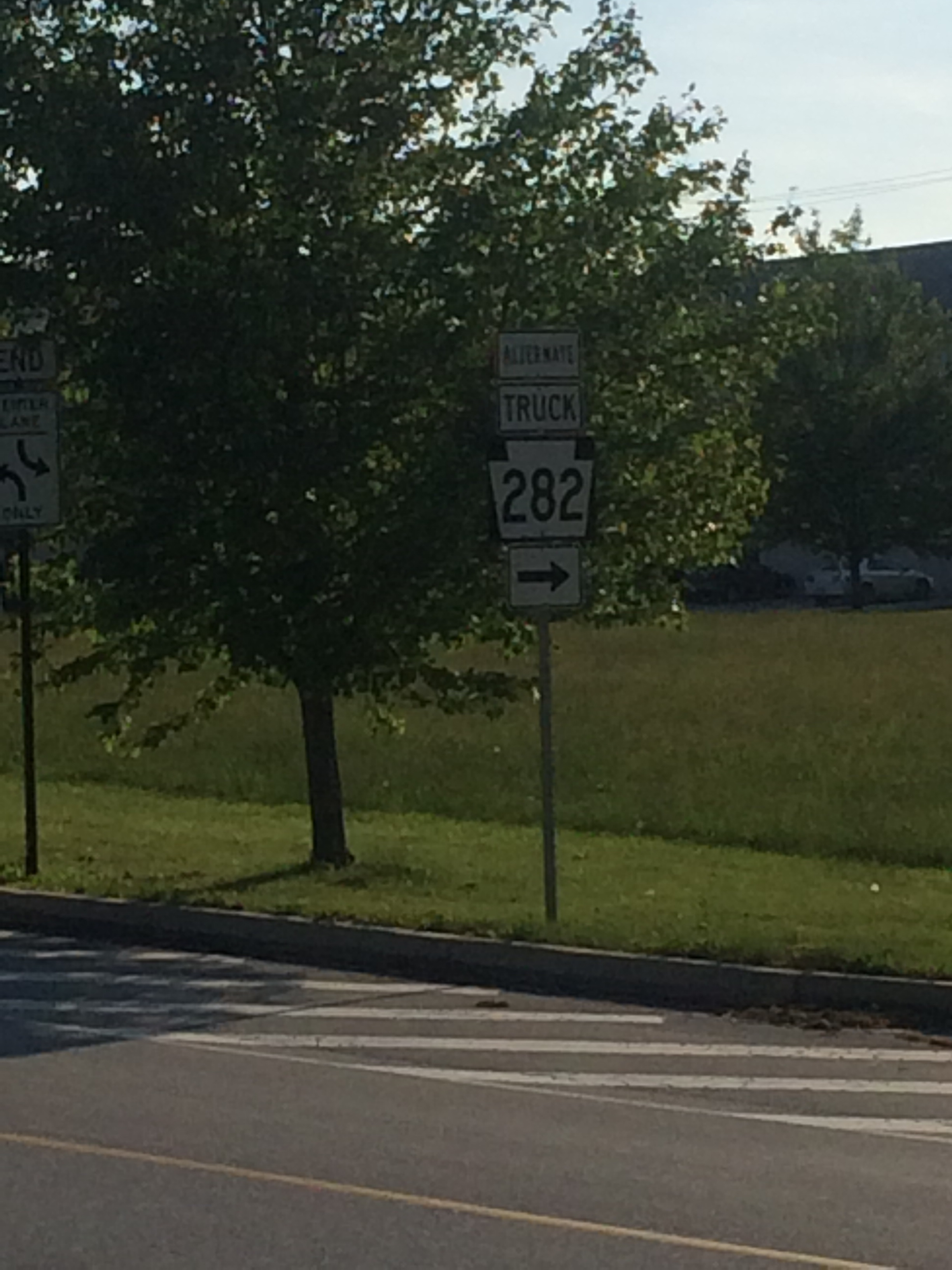
PA 282 Alternate Truck in Eagle, Pennsylvania.
