= U.S. Route 30 Business (Chester County, Pennsylvania) =

Highway in Pennsylvania

U.S. Route 30 Business
- Lincoln Highway; Lancaster Avenue
- US 30 Bus. highlighted in red US 30 Bus. Alt. Truck highlighted in blue

Route information
- Auxiliary route of US 30
- Maintained by PennDOT
- Length: 18.79 mi (30.24 km)

Major junctions
- West end: US 30 in Sadsbury Township
- PA 82 in Coatesville; PA 340 in Thorndale; US 322 in Downingtown; PA 282 in Downingtown; PA 113 in Downingtown; US 30 in East Caln Township; PA 100 in Exton
- East end: US 30 / US 202 in Glenloch

Location
- Country: United States
- State: Pennsylvania
- Counties: Chester

Highway system
- United States Numbered Highway System; List; Special; Divided; Pennsylvania State Route System; Interstate; US; State; Scenic; Legislative

U.S. Route 30 Business (US 30 Bus.) is a 19-mile (31 km) business route of US 30 in Chester County, Pennsylvania. The route follows the former alignment of US 30 between Sadsbury Township and East Whiteland Township, passing through Coatesville, Downingtown, and Exton. US 30 follows a freeway bypass between these two points. The present alignment of US 30 Bus. was originally part of a turnpike called the Philadelphia and Lancaster Turnpike that was completed in 1794. The state took over the turnpike at the beginning of the 20th century. In 1913, present-day US 30 Bus. was incorporated into the Lincoln Highway, an auto trail that ran from San Francisco east to New York City. The Lincoln Highway through Pennsylvania became Pennsylvania Route 1 (PA 1) in 1924. US 30 was designated concurrent with PA 1 west of Philadelphia in 1926, with the PA 1 designation removed two years later. US 30 was widened into a multilane road through Chester County in the 1930s. In the 1960s, US 30 was moved to a freeway bypass around Coatesville and Downingtown, with US 30 Bus. designated onto the former alignment of US 30. In 1995, US 30 Bus. was extended east when the US 30 freeway was extended to bypass Exton.

== Route description ==
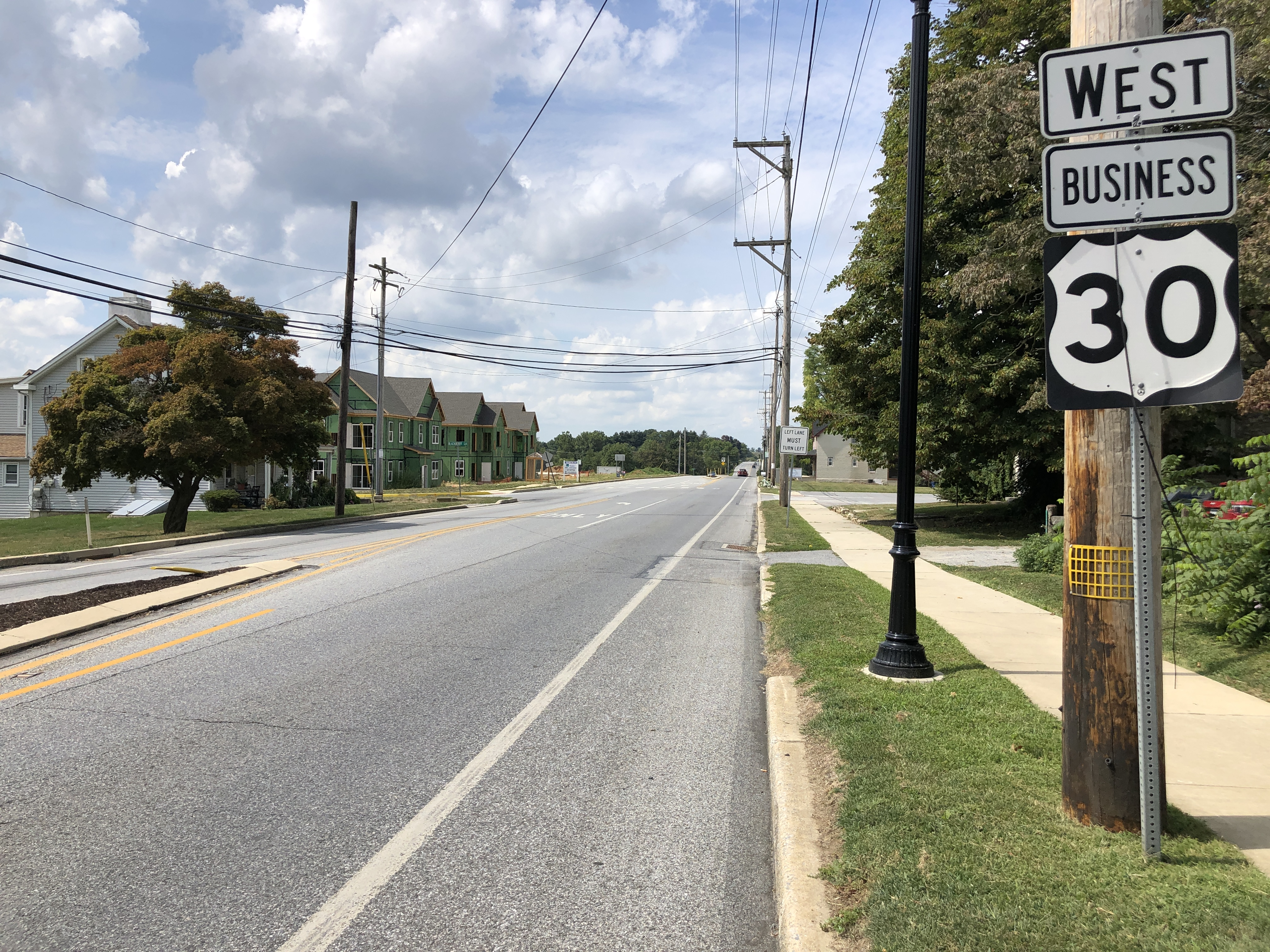
US 30 Bus. westbound in Sadsburyville

US 30 Bus. begins at an interchange with US 30 at the western terminus of the freeway section a short distance east of US 30's intersection with PA 10 in Sadsbury Township. This interchange has access from westbound US 30 Bus. to westbound US 30 and access from eastbound US 30 to eastbound US 30 Bus. From this interchange, US 30 Bus. heads east on Lincoln Highway, a four-lane divided highway that soon becomes a three-lane road with a center left-turn lane as it runs through a mix of farm fields and homes, crossing Buck Run. The road passes through the community of Sadsburyville, where there are alternating stretches of center turn lane and divided highway, and continues through a mix of fields and residential and commercial development, crossing into Valley Township. US 30 Bus. passes to the north of Chester County G. O. Carlson Airport and heads east past residences and some businesses in the community of Hayti, turning to the southeast and narrowing to a two-lane undivided road. The route comes to a bridge over Amtrak's Keystone Corridor railroad line and enters the city of Coatesville, curving to the east-northeast and passing through urban residential areas. US 30 Bus. comes to an intersection with PA 82, where that route turns east for a concurrency with US 30 Bus. on Lincoln Highway. The road runs past more homes before passing to the north of a Cleveland-Cliffs (formerly Lukens Steel Company) steel plant. The road crosses the West Branch Brandywine Creek and a Brandywine Valley Railroad line at-grade before PA 82 splits from US 30 Bus. by heading northwest on North 1st Avenue. US 30 Bus. continues east through the commercial downtown of Coatesville before heading past a mix of urban homes and businesses.

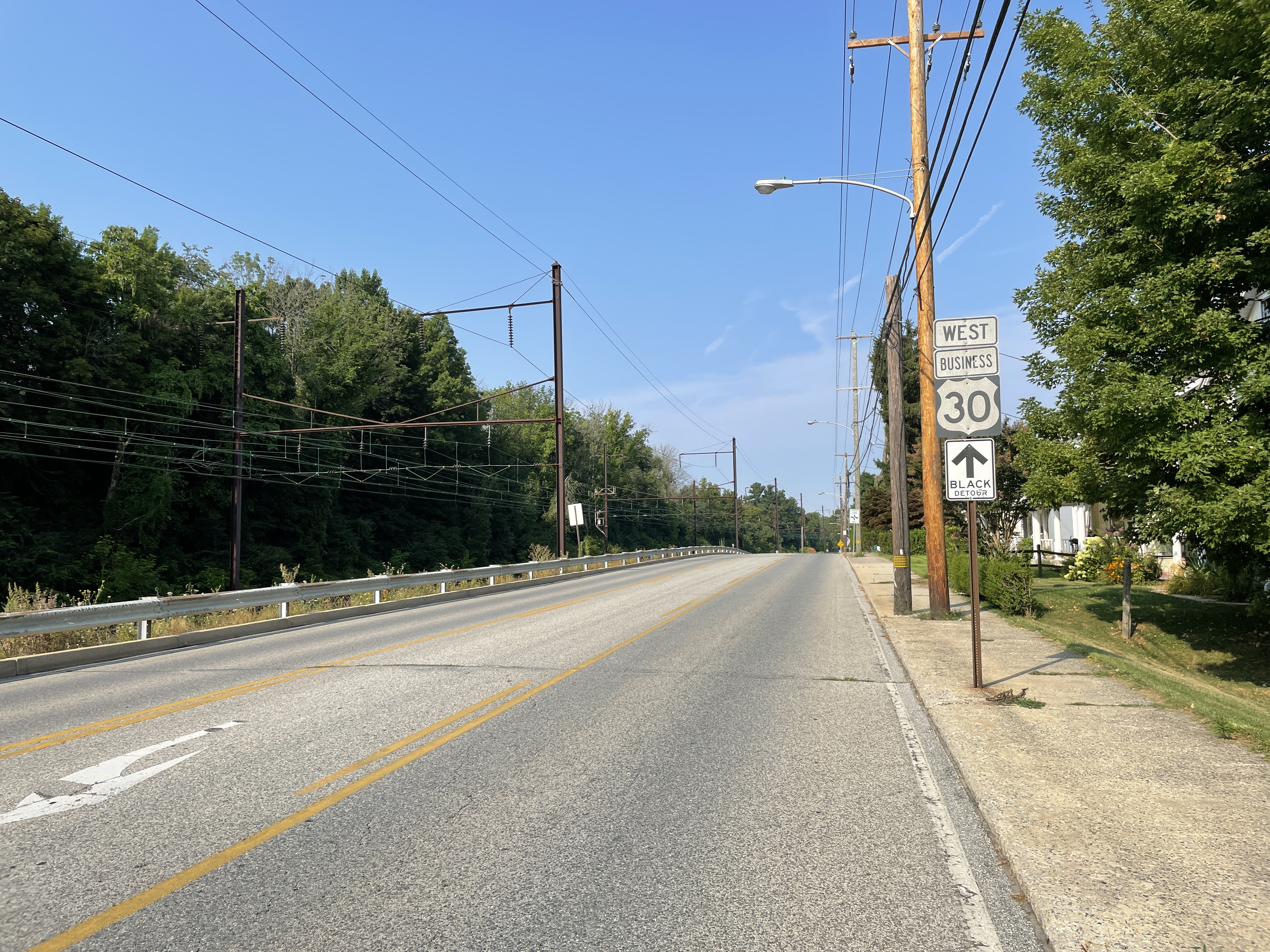
US 30 Bus. westbound in Downingtown

The road leaves Coatesville for Caln Township and comes to another bridge over Amtrak's Keystone Corridor. From here, the route gains a center left-turn lane and runs past businesses a short distance to the north of the Amtrak line, passing through the community of Caln. US 30 Bus. heads into the community of Thorndale and passes north of the Thorndale station, which serves as the terminus of SEPTA's Paoli/Thorndale Line that follows Amtrak's Keystone Corridor. A short distance later, the route comes to an intersection with the eastern terminus of PA 340. The road continues east past a mix of homes and businesses to the north of the parallel Amtrak line, passing through the community of Gallagherville. US 30 Bus. enters the borough of Downingtown, where the name becomes West Lancaster Avenue, and curves to the northeast, heading between residential areas to the north and the railroad tracks to the south and narrowing to two lanes. The road passes north of the Downingtown station serving Amtrak and SEPTA trains before Amtrak's Keystone Corridor splits further south from the road. The route heads past a mix of homes and businesses before it comes to an intersection with US 322, where US 322 turns northeast for a concurrency with US 30 Bus. The road heads across the East Branch Brandywine Creek and curves east into the commercial downtown of Downingtown on East Lancaster Avenue, where US 322 splits to the south and US 30 Bus. becomes concurrent with US 322 Truck. US 30 Bus. continues through the downtown area and turns northeast, coming to an intersection with the eastern terminus of PA 282. Following this intersection, the road runs through residential areas and reaches a junction with the southern terminus of PA 113. The route continues northeast past a mix of homes and businesses.

US 30 Bus. becomes the border between East Caln Township to the north and Downingtown to the south, gaining a center left-turn lane. The roadway fully enters East Caln Township and heads into business areas, becoming a four-lane undivided road and bending to the east. US 322 Truck splits from US 30 Bus. by heading south onto Quarry Road as US 30 Bus. reaches an interchange with the US 30 freeway. Past this interchange, the road becomes a four-lane divided highway and passes more commercial development. The route becomes undivided as it crosses into West Whiteland Township and continues east through a mix of residential and commercial areas on Lincoln Highway, turning into a five-lane road with a center left-turn lane and running through the community of Whitford. US 30 Bus. heads into the community of Exton and passes through business areas, coming to an intersection with PA 100. Past this intersection, the route heads to the south of the Exton Square Mall and narrows to a three-lane road with a center left-turn lane, crossing the Chester Valley Trail. The road continues east through a mix of fields, woods, and commercial development. US 30 Bus. reaches its eastern terminus at an interchange with US 30 at the eastern terminus of the freeway section and the US 202 freeway in the community of Glenloch on the border of West Whiteland Township and East Whiteland Township, where the road continues east as part of US 30 into the community of Frazer.

== History ==
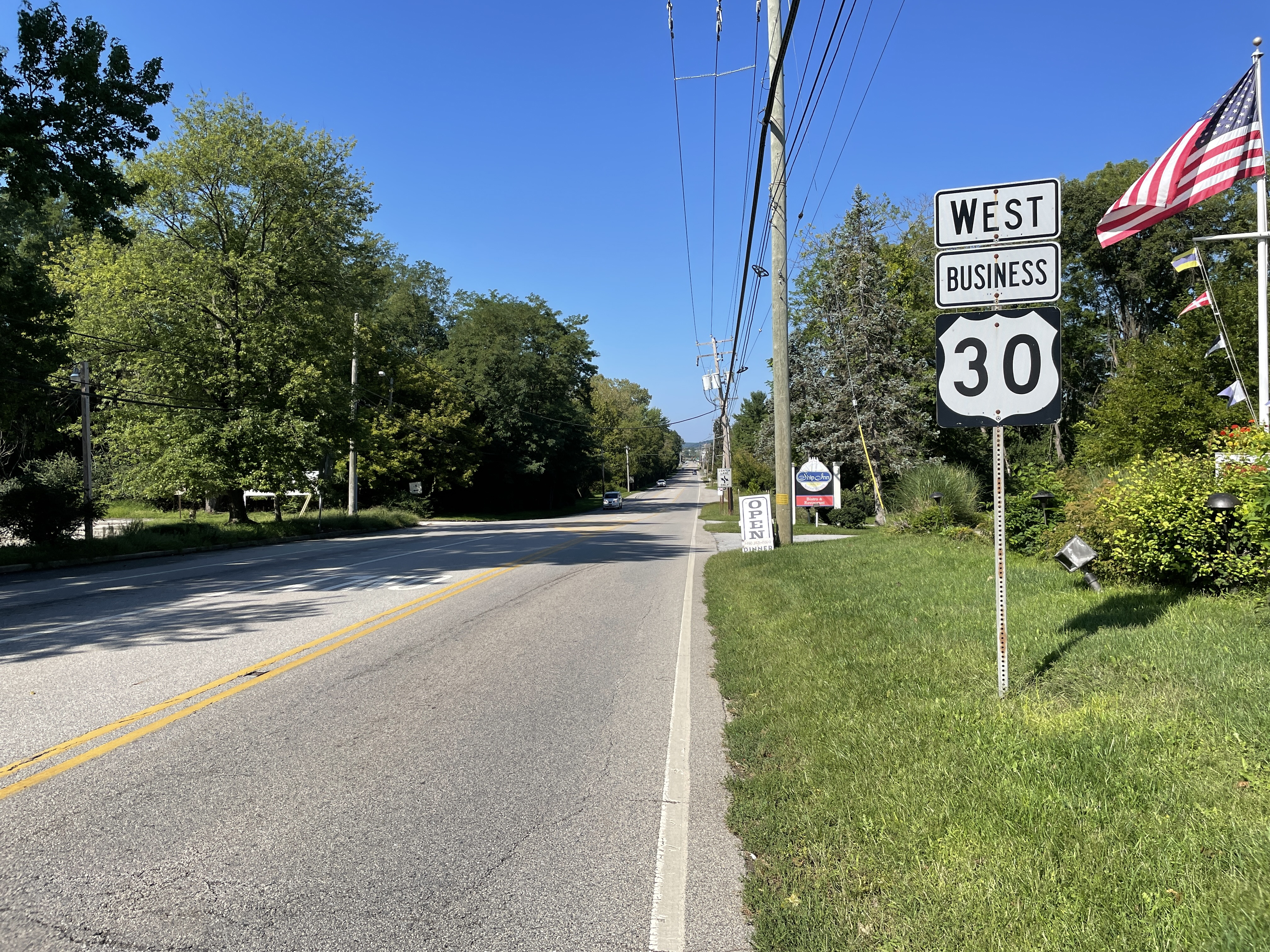
US 30 Bus. westbound in Exton

The present-day alignment of US 30 Bus. was constructed as part of the Philadelphia and Lancaster Turnpike, a turnpike connecting Lancaster to Philadelphia. The turnpike company was incorporated in 1792 and the road was completed in 1794. The Philadelphia and Lancaster Turnpike was built with a stone and gravel surface and was the first long-distance turnpike constructed in the United States, leading to a movement to improve roads across the country. The turnpike also opened up settlement to the Northwest Territory past the Ohio River and provided cheap transportation between the coastal areas and the "bread basket" region around Lancaster. By 1843, the rise of the railroads and the canals reduced the use of the Philadelphia and Lancaster Turnpike, and the road fell into disrepair and saw decreased usage through the later part of the 19th century. The state acquired the Philadelphia and Lancaster Turnpike at the beginning of the 20th century.

Following the passage of the Sproul Road Bill in 1911, the present-day alignment of US 30 Bus. was designated as part of Legislative Route 142, which ran from Lancaster east to Philadelphia. In 1913, the current routing of US 30 Bus. became part of the Lincoln Highway, an auto trail that ran from San Francisco east to New York City. The Lincoln Highway within Pennsylvania was designated as PA 1 in 1924. With the creation of the United States Numbered Highway System in 1926, US 30 was designated concurrently with PA 1 on the Lincoln Highway west of Philadelphia. The concurrent PA 1 designation was removed from US 30 in 1928.

In the 1930s, the section of US 30 through Chester County was widened to a multilane road. By 1960, a freeway bypass for US 30 was proposed to run from just east of the PA 10 intersection to east of Downingtown. In 1963, the freeway bypass of US 30 between east of PA 10 and east of Downingtown was completed, with US 30 Bus. designated onto the former alignment of US 30. In December 1995, the US 30 freeway was extended east to bypass Exton, ending at an interchange with the US 202 freeway. As a result, US 30 Bus. was extended east through Exton along the former alignment of US 30 to its current eastern terminus.

== Major intersections ==
The entire route is in Chester County.

Location	mi	km	Destinations	Notes
Sadsbury Township	0.00	0.00	US 30 west	Continuation west
Coatesville	5.09	8.19	PA 82 south (Strode Avenue)	Western end of PA 82 concurrency
Coatesville	5.50	8.85	PA 82 north (1st Avenue) to US 30	Eastern end of PA 82 concurrency
Caln Township	9.74	15.68	PA 340 west (Bondsville Road) – Wagontown	Eastern terminus of PA 340
Downingtown	11.98	19.28	US 322 west (Manor Avenue) to US 30	Western end of US 322 concurrency
Downingtown	12.16	19.57	US 322 east (Brandywine Avenue) – West Chester US 322 Truck begins	Eastern end of US 322 concurrency; western end of US 322 Truck concurrency
Downingtown	12.30	19.79	PA 282 west (Green Street)	Eastern terminus of PA 282
Downingtown	12.68	20.41	PA 113 north (West Uwchlan Avenue) to Penna Turnpike	Southern terminus of PA 113
East Caln Township	13.86	22.31	US 322 Truck east (Quarry Road) to US 30 east – King of Prussia	Eastern end of US 322 Truck concurrency
East Caln Township	13.91	22.39	US 30 west – Coatesville, Lancaster	Interchange; access to and from westbound US 30
West Whiteland Township	16.48	26.52	PA 100 (Pottstown Pike) to Penna Turnpike – Pottstown, West Chester	
West Whiteland Township–East Whiteland Township line	18.79	30.24	US 30 west – Downingtown	Interchange
West Whiteland Township–East Whiteland Township line	18.79	30.24	US 202 south – West Chester	Interchange; access to and from southbound US 202
West Whiteland Township–East Whiteland Township line	18.79	30.24	US 30 east to US 202 north – Frazer, King of Prussia	Continuation east
1.000 mi = 1.609 km; 1.000 km = 0.621 mi: Concurrency terminus; Incomplete access

== U.S. Route 30 Business Alternate Truck ==
=== Coatesville ===
U.S. Route 30 Business Alternate Truck
- Location: Coatesville, Pennsylvania
- Existed: 2025–present

U.S. Route 30 Business Alternate Truck (US 30 Bus. Alt. Truck) is a truck route of US 30 Bus. around a weight-restricted bridge over the West Branch Brandywine Creek in Coatesville, on which trucks over 30 tons are prohibited. The route follows Airport Road, US 30, and PA 82. Signs were posted in 2025.

=== Downingtown ===
U.S. Route 30 Business Alternate Truck
- Location: Downingtown, Pennsylvania
- Existed: 2013–present

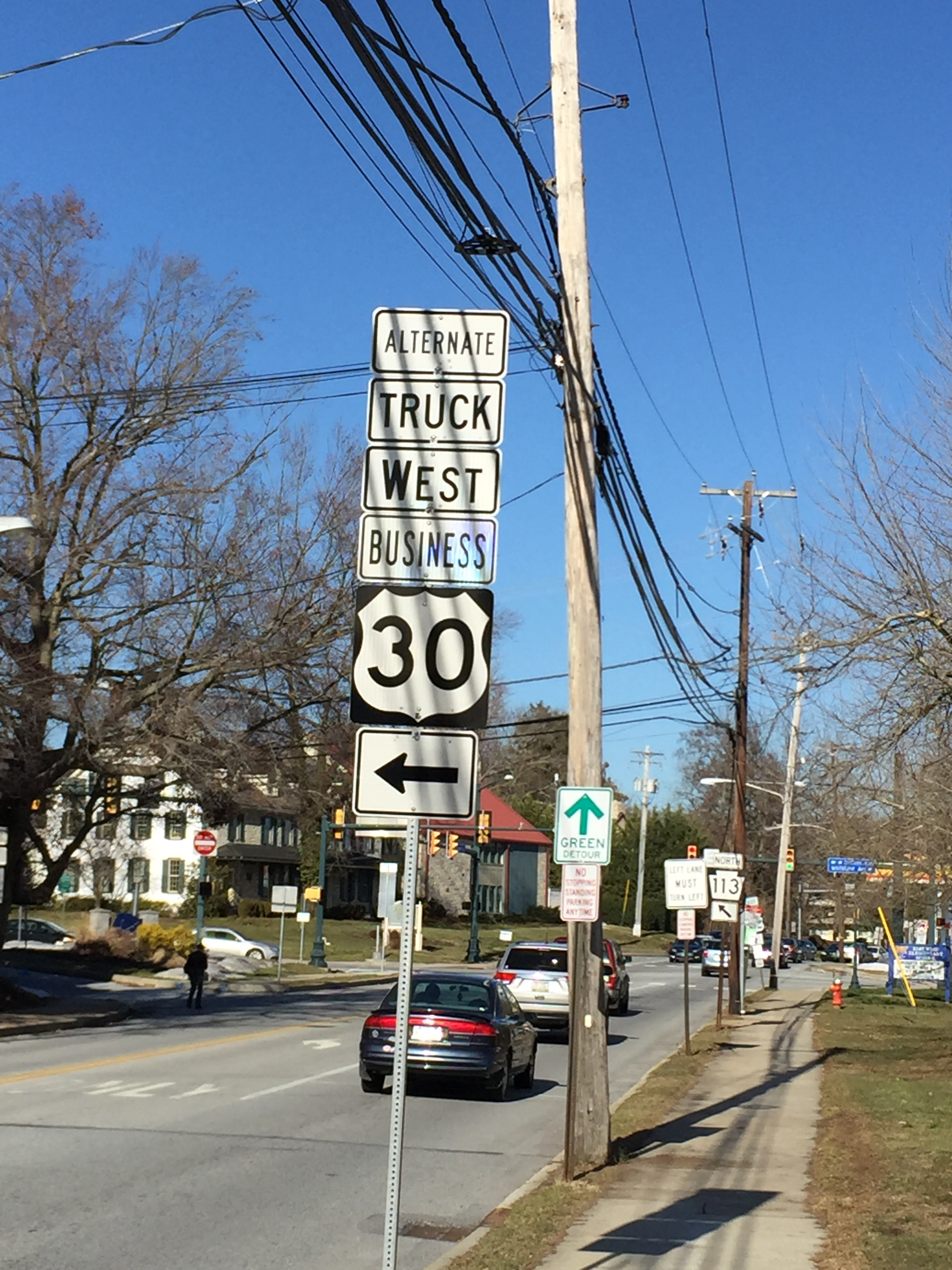
US 30 Bus. Alt. Truck In Downingtown

U.S. Route 30 Business Alternate Truck (US 30 Bus. Alt. Truck) is a truck route of US 30 Bus. around a weight-restricted bridge over the East Branch Brandywine Creek in Downingtown, Pennsylvania, on which trucks over 36 tons and combination loads over 40 tons are prohibited. The route follows US 322, the US 30 freeway, and PA 113. US 30 Bus. Alt. Truck runs concurrently with US 322 Alt. Truck along US 30 and PA 113.
