= Special route =

Type of United States road

Types of special routes found in the United States

In road transportation in the United States, a special route is a road in a numbered highway system that diverts a specific segment of related traffic away from another road. They are featured in many highway systems; most are found in the Interstate Highway System, U.S. highway system, and several state highway systems. Each type of special route possesses generally defined characteristics and has a defined relationship with its parent route. Typically, special routes share a route number with a dominant route, often referred as the "parent" or "mainline", and are given either a descriptor which may be used either before or after the route name, such as Alternate or Business, or a letter suffix that is attached to the route number. For example, an alternate route of U.S. Route 1 may be called "Alternate U.S. Route 1", "U.S. Route 1 Alternate", or "U.S. Route 1A". Occasionally, a special route will have both a descriptor and a suffix, such as U.S. Route 1A Business.

== Nomenclature ==
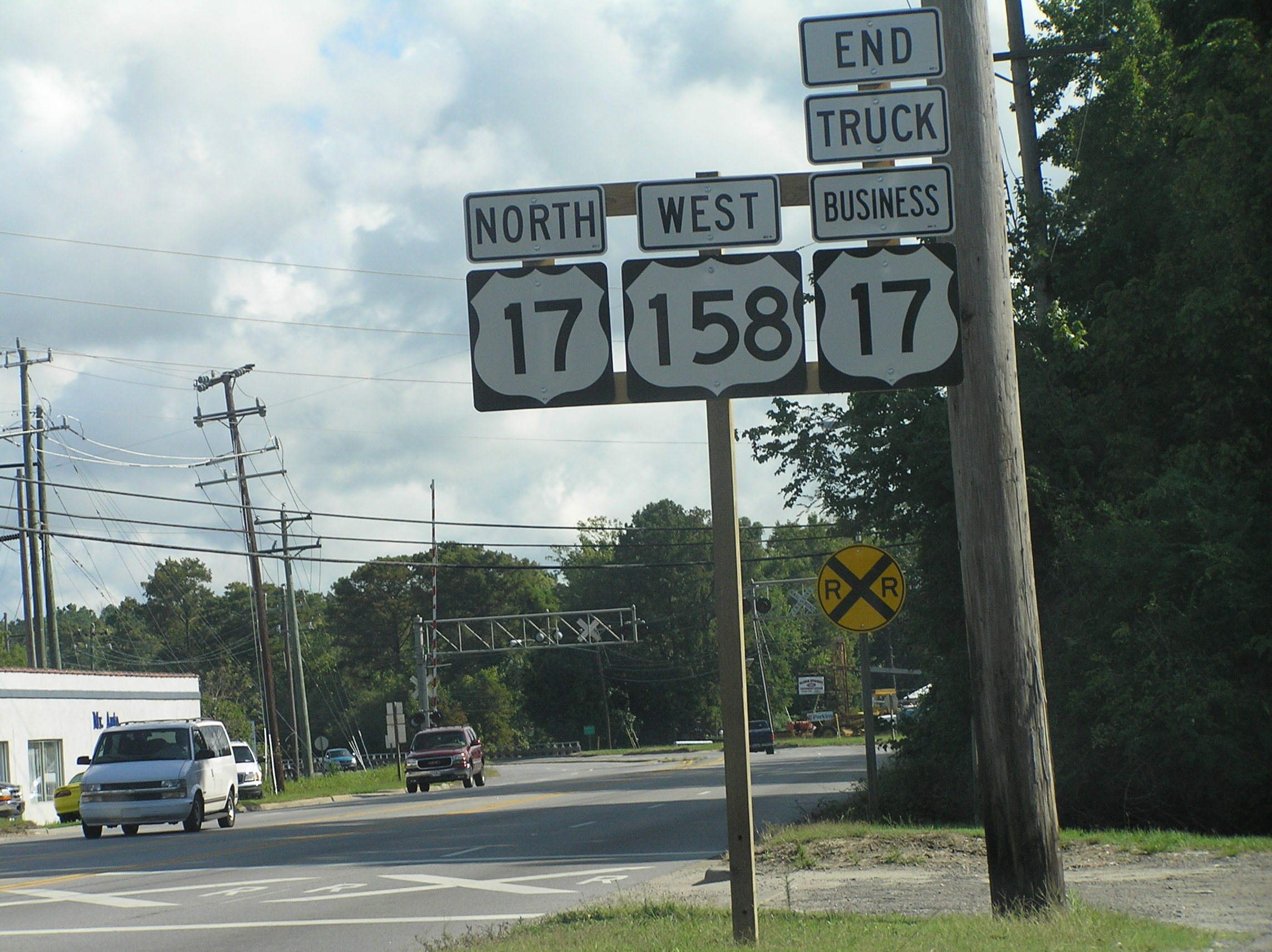
Truck Business US 17 ends at its parent in Elizabeth City, North Carolina

In the field, the special route is typically distinguished from the parent route with the use of auxiliary words or suffix letters placed on the route shield or on an adjacent sign, known as a "route sign auxiliary sign" according to the Manual on Uniform Traffic Control Devices (MUTCD).

The American Association of State Highway and Transportation Officials (AASHTO) sets the nationwide precedent for special routes, particularly for U.S. Numbered Highways. As of 2009, the standards organization only advocates four types of special routes: business, bypass, alternate, and temporary. AASHTO suggests that transportation authorities of the United States remove other types of special routes and/or replace such obsolete designations with another type of route.

Some old alignments of routes may also be informally known as special routes (despite some that do not intersect the parent route). These older alignments may be given street names like "Old U.S. Highway 52", or in some rare cases, be signed with route shields attached to "Old" or "Historic" sign plates (such as decommissioned sections of former U.S. Route 66 that are still driveable).

In the case of U.S. state route systems, special routes are generally restricted to primary state routes, not secondary state routes, though Missouri has seven supplemental routes with short spur routes, and the 500-series county routes in New Jersey have alternate, bypass, spur, and truck routes.

A few highways have two special route designations, such as Business Alternate, Alternate Business, Truck Business, and Alternate Truck. There is also an example of a route with three special route designations: U.S. Route 30 Business Alternate Truck provides an alternate truck bypass of U.S. Route 30 Business in Downingtown, Pennsylvania.

== Special route types and respective behavior ==
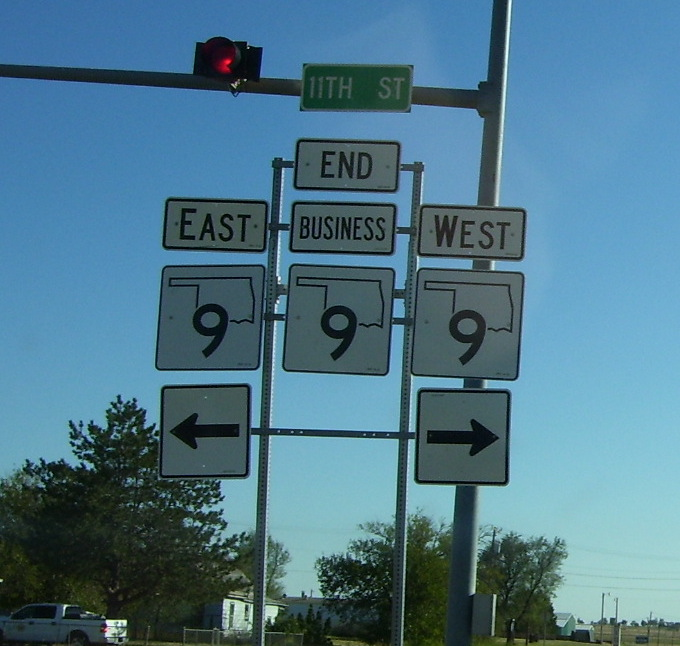
Business SH-9 in Hobart, Oklahoma ends at its parent route. The center SH-9 shield is topped with a typical "BUSINESS" sign.

Routes with special designations in the U.S. have typical behavior that distinguishes them from other routes. There are, however, many exceptions to the common behavior, depending on the situation.

=== Business, City, and Bypass routes ===
Business routes (also known as city routes) can be loops or spurs and generally traverse through or near population centers (usually towns and small cities). They are usually signed with "business" or "bus" auxiliaries or a "B" suffix. Most business routes are the former alignments of their parent. Bypass routes (rarely known as "Relief routes") typically go around population centers and are newer and faster than their mainline and/or business route counterparts.

In some cases, due to urban sprawl over time, land around bypasses can become developed, expanding the population center outward and creating a misnomer with the term "bypass". Approaching a population center, it is common for the parent route to split between a business route and a bypass route and rejoin to form the parent on the other side.

AASHTO defines a business route for U.S. highways as

...a route principally within the corporate limits of a city which provides the traveling public an opportunity to travel through that city, passing through the business part of the city; while the regular number is used to obviate passing through the congested part of the city. This "Business Route" connects with the regular numbered route at the opposite side of the city limits.

AASHTO defines bypass or relief routes for U.S. highways as:

...a route which is established for the purpose of designating a route which entirely by-passes a city or congested area and joins in with the regular numbered route beyond the city or congested area.

==== Business Interstates ====
Business Loop Interstate 85

AASHTO defines a category of special routes separate from primary and auxiliary Interstate designations known as Interstate Business routes. These routes do not have to comply to Interstate construction standards, but are routes that may be identified and approved by the association. The same route marking policy applies to both U.S. Numbered Highways and Interstate highways; however, business route designations are sometimes used for Interstate highways.

Known as Business Loops and Business Spurs, these routes that principally travel through the corporate limits of a city, passing through the central business district of the city. Business routes are used when the regular route is directed around the city. They sport green Interstate shields, as opposed to the normal red and blue, with the word "Business" replacing the normal "Interstate" word on the upper portion of the shield.

==== Truck routes ====
U.S. Route 1/9 Truck in New Jersey

Truck routes were initially known as Bypass routes, and were loops created as a means to divert through truck traffic away from population centers, but the designation was changed to "bypass" in 1959–1960 by AASHTO. Today, Truck routes exist as alternatives for the mainline routes that are ill-suited for large truck travel with obstacles (such as low clearance bridges, sharp turns, or steep grades) or with conditions that could create dangerous situations to smaller vehicles. An example of such a route is U.S. Route 1/9 Truck in New Jersey, which bypasses the segment of U.S. Route 1/9 that uses the Pulaski Skyway, on which trucks are banned.

=== Alternate Truck Routes ===
There are alternate truck routes in several counties in southeastern Pennsylvania. They bypass weight-restricted bridges over creeks and rivers. They are mainly routed on major highways and freeways and other roads they intersect to bypass that specific bridge. An example of an alternate truck route is Pennsylvania Route 82 Alternate Truck which bypasses a weight-restricted bridge over East Branch of Red Clay Creek. Most of the alternate truck routes were signed in 2013, though some were signed as recently as 2023.

=== Alternate and Optional routes ===
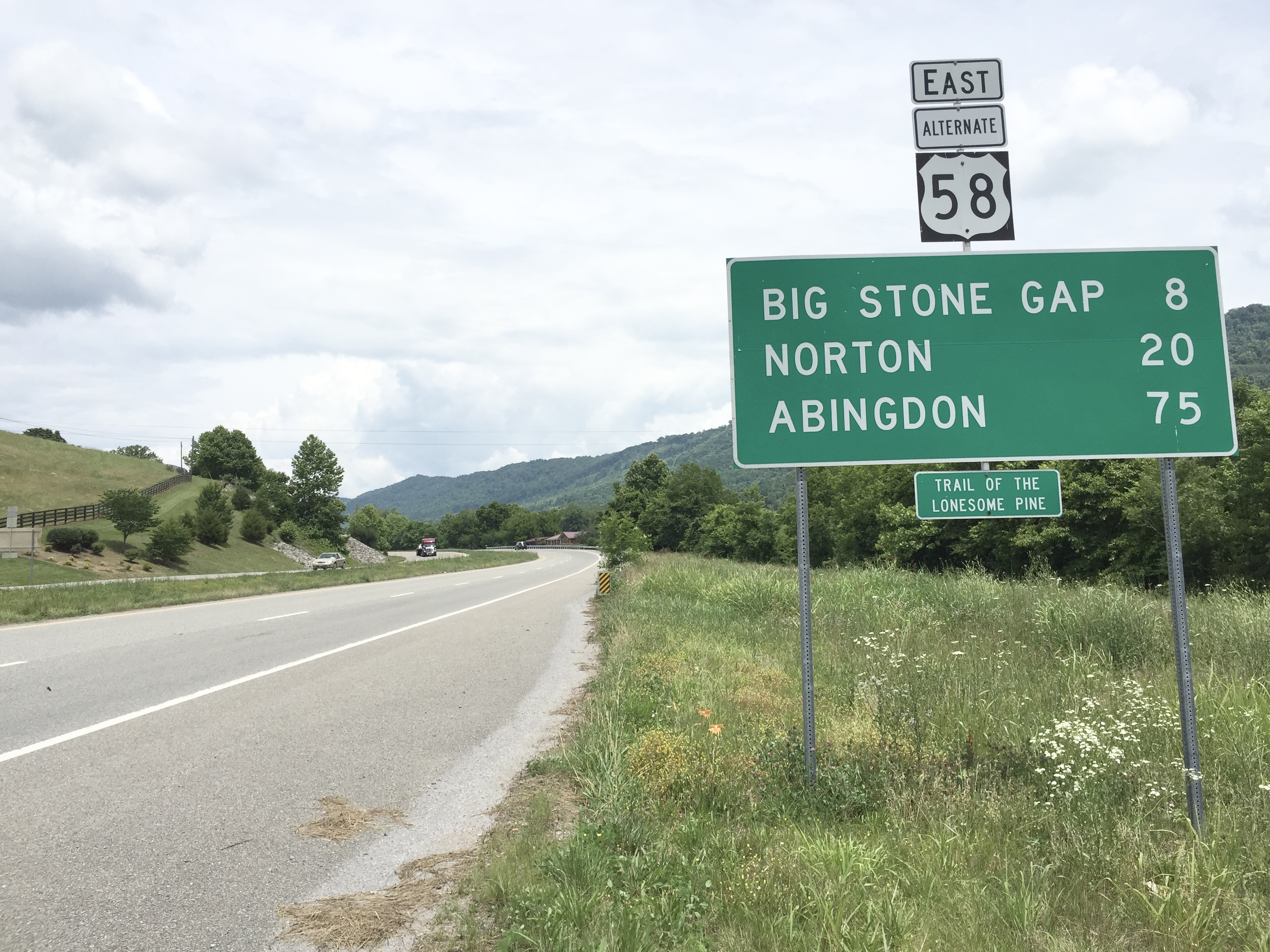
U.S. Route 58 Alternate serves as an alternate alignment to U.S. Route 58 in the western part of Virginia

Alternate routes are loops that provide alternative alignment for a parent route. They are usually signed with an "alternate" or "alt" auxiliary or an "A" suffix. They generally traverse through a different settlements or different city neighborhoods than the parent route, but roughly remain parallel to the parent. Unlike business routes and bypasses, their relationship to population centers varies from case to case. Alternates also can be quite longer than most other special routes with some spanning over 50 miles (e.g. US 1A in Maine and US 74A in North Carolina).

Prior to 1960 there were "optional" routes in the United States that were synonymous with alternate routes. As a means of providing uniformity, the "Optional" term was phased out in the 1960s.

=== Spur routes ===
Spur routes split away from the parent route without returning. They usually end in a settlement or area not served by the parent.

=== Connector routes ===
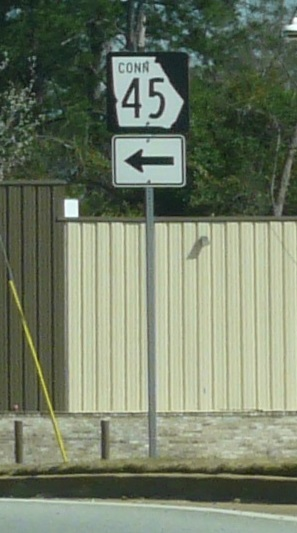
State Route 45 Connector in Georgia

Signage for Conn. M-44 in Michigan

A connector is a highway or freeway road in the United States that connects to another highway or freeway. It can be part of an interchange such as the MacArthur Maze in Oakland, California, or a longer roadway such as the 13-mile-long (21 km) Interstate 635 in the Kansas City metropolitan area.

A connector route is a type of special route or supplemental route in the United States that serves as a connector, connecting one route to a more prominent route. Connector routes are found among the United States Numbered Highways and among some state route systems like Michigan and Nebraska.

Connector routes can also be designated as a routing between two numbered highways. Examples include Connector M-44, which runs along Plainfield Avenue between Interstate 96 and M-44 north of Grand Rapids, Michigan, and Pearl Harbor Memorial Turnpike Extension (also known as the Pennsylvania Turnpike Connector), which connects the New Jersey Turnpike with the Delaware River extension of the Pennsylvania Turnpike.

=== Scenic routes ===
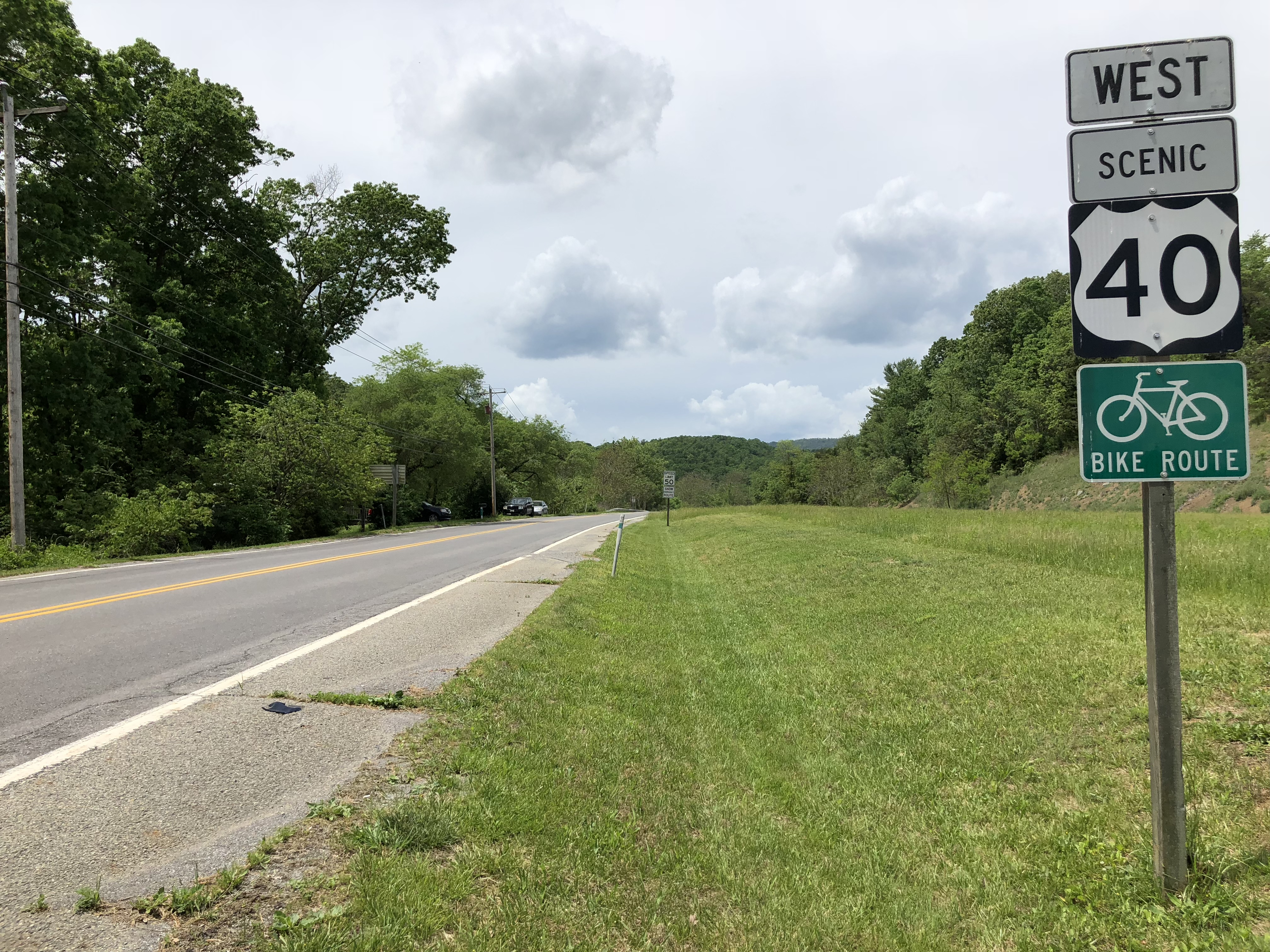
US Route 40 Scenic in Maryland

Scenic routes, in terms of special routes, are loops of a parent route that traverse through an area of natural or historical significance. Only one route in the country remains with the official Scenic designation: US 40 Scenic.

=== Toll routes ===
Toll I-376 in Pennsylvania

Toll routes, in terms of special routes, are loops that are faster than the parent route, but are tolled. The other usage with the promulgation of the 2009 MUTCD is to use a yellow toll plate above the marker along tolled segments of highways.

=== Loop routes ===
Georgia Loop 10 is a loop route.

Loop routes, in terms of special routes, are loops that form a complete radial around an area, having at least one intersection with the parent route. Because of their circumferential nature, inner/outer directions have been used to sign such routes, as opposed to cardinal directions, though this convention is not universally followed (Arizona Loops 101, 202, and 303 in the Phoenix metropolitan area do not follow such convention, and are signed with cardinal directions based on their local orientation). Georgia State Route 10 Loop, which is the perimeter highway around Athens, Georgia, and the former Georgia State Route 120 Loop, which encircled a section of Marietta, Georgia, are two examples. Loop routes are common throughout Texas; see List of state highway loops in Texas.

=== Temporary routes ===
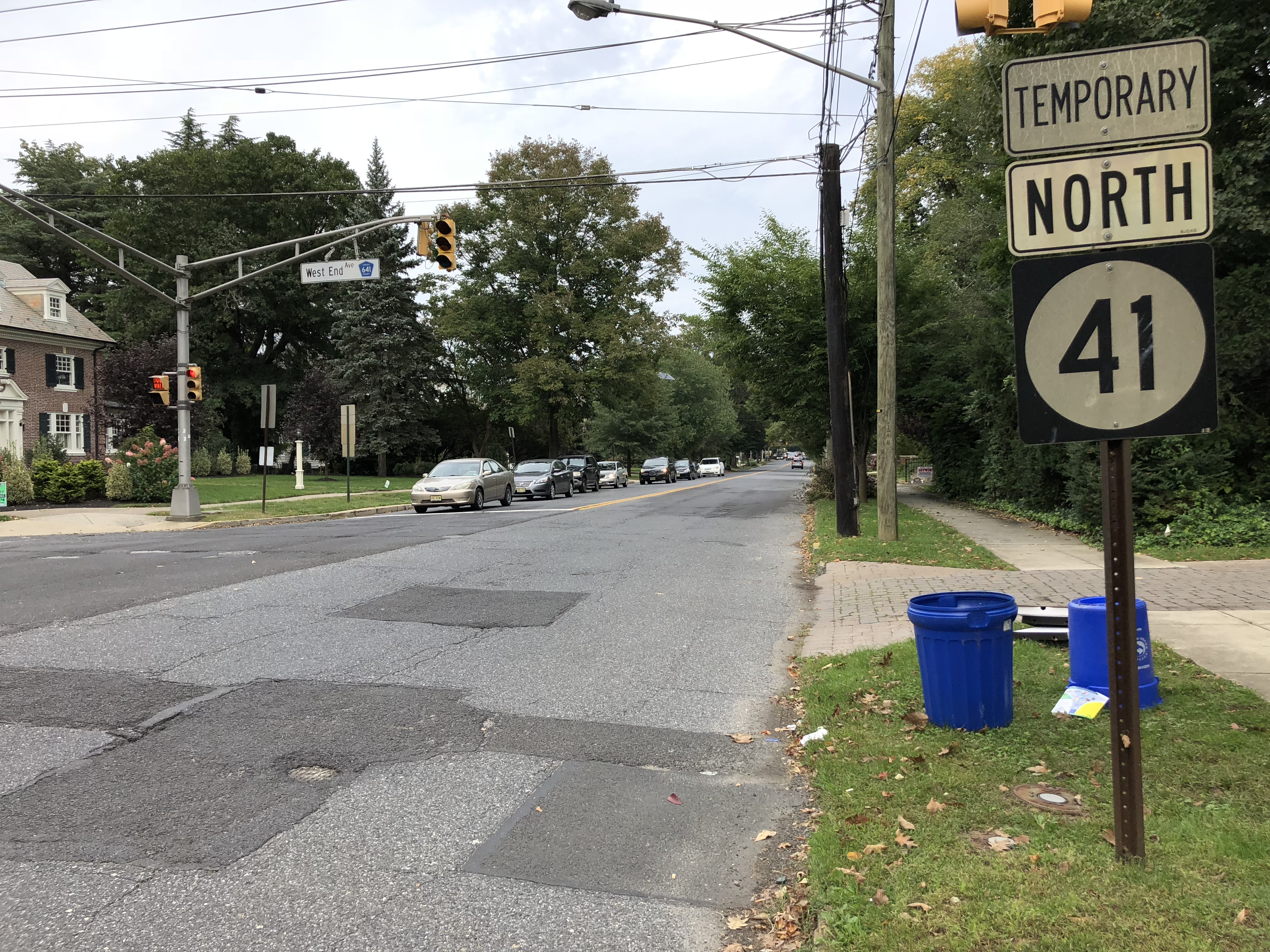
Route 41 Temporary signage in Haddonfield, New Jersey

Temporary routes complete a gap between two segments of a parent route that exists because the parent route through the area has not been fully constructed. They serve as a long-term detour until the parent route's planned path is completed, at which point the Temporary designation is either removed or replaced by another designation such as Alternate or Business. Temporary routes generally traverse along roads of a lower standard than the planned mainline. An example is US 191 through a copper mine north of Clifton, Arizona.

AASHTO defines and specifies that temporary routes should have the following behavior:

In the erection of signs for numbering routes, it is necessary in some cases to carry a number temporarily over a road that ultimately will not be the permanent location of that number. Great care should be taken by the State Highway Departments in seeing that when numbers of this character are permitted, that a standard strip carrying the words "Temporary" shall be placed on the staff above the number. This will obviate much hard feeling when it is necessary to change a number to the permanently established route.

=== Emergency detour routes ===
Emergency plate

A rare type of special route, known as the Emergency Detour route, is signed with an auxiliary "Emergency" sign that is colored orange, indicating a temporary traffic control sign. The purpose of these routes is to offer an alternative in case the parent route is impassable, due to either a traffic jams, traffic collision, or road closure (for a variety of reasons).

=== Divided routes ===
US 25 splits in Tennessee into US 25E and US 25W

Some U.S. Routes are given directional suffixes to indicate a split of the main route — for instance, U.S. Route 25 splits into U.S. Route 25E (east) and U.S. Route 25W (west) between Newport, Tennessee and North Corbin, Kentucky, and U.S. Route 9W is an alternate of U.S. Route 9 between Fort Lee, New Jersey and Albany, New York. These splits were in the system of United States Numbered Highways from the beginning, and were used when two roughly equivalent routes existed. They are usually loops, but some have been spurs, though since they use directional letter suffixes, they are not generally considered special routes. AASHTO no longer assigns these numbers, and in theory current ones are to be eliminated "as rapidly as the State Highway Department and the Standing Committee on Highways can reach agreement". This policy was adopted by 1996; however, many of these routes still exist, mostly in Tennessee.

== History ==
Originally in the United States, the terms used for special routes were "City", "Truck", and "Optional". In 1959–1960, the terms were changed to "Business", "Bypass", and "Alternate", respectively; however, the "Truck" sign is still used today on many routes, especially those where trucks are prohibited on the mainline (for example, U.S. Route 1/9 Truck in Jersey City, New Jersey, which routes trucks around the Pulaski Skyway, which bans them). AASHTO has called for the removal of "alternate" routes, though many still exist.

== See also ==
- List of special routes of the United States Numbered Highway System
