= Glenloch, Pennsylvania =

Unincorporated community in Pennsylvania, US

- Unincorporated community
- Location within Pennsylvania Location within the United States
- Coordinates: 40°01′48″N 75°35′05″W
- Country: United States
- State: Pennsylvania
- County: Chester
- Township: East Whiteland and West Whiteland
- Elevation: 440 ft (130 m)
- Time zone: UTC-5 (Eastern (EST))
  - Summer (DST): UTC-4 (EDT)
- ZIP codes: 19341, 19355
- Area codes: 610 and 484
- GNIS feature ID: 1203689

Glenloch is an unincorporated community that is located in East Whiteland and West Whiteland Township, Chester County, Pennsylvania in the United States.

== Geography ==
Located between Exton and Frazer, Glenloch is served by U.S. Route 30, U.S. Route 202, and Lincoln Highway (U.S. Route 30 Business) These three roads interchange at a spaghetti junction.

The Phoenixville Pike and Valley Center Boulevard are other important roads in Glenloch; both end at the Lincoln Highway.

This community is split between the post offices of West Chester, Exton, and Malvern with the ZIP codes of 19380, 19341, and 19355, respectively.
