= East Branch Brandywine Creek =

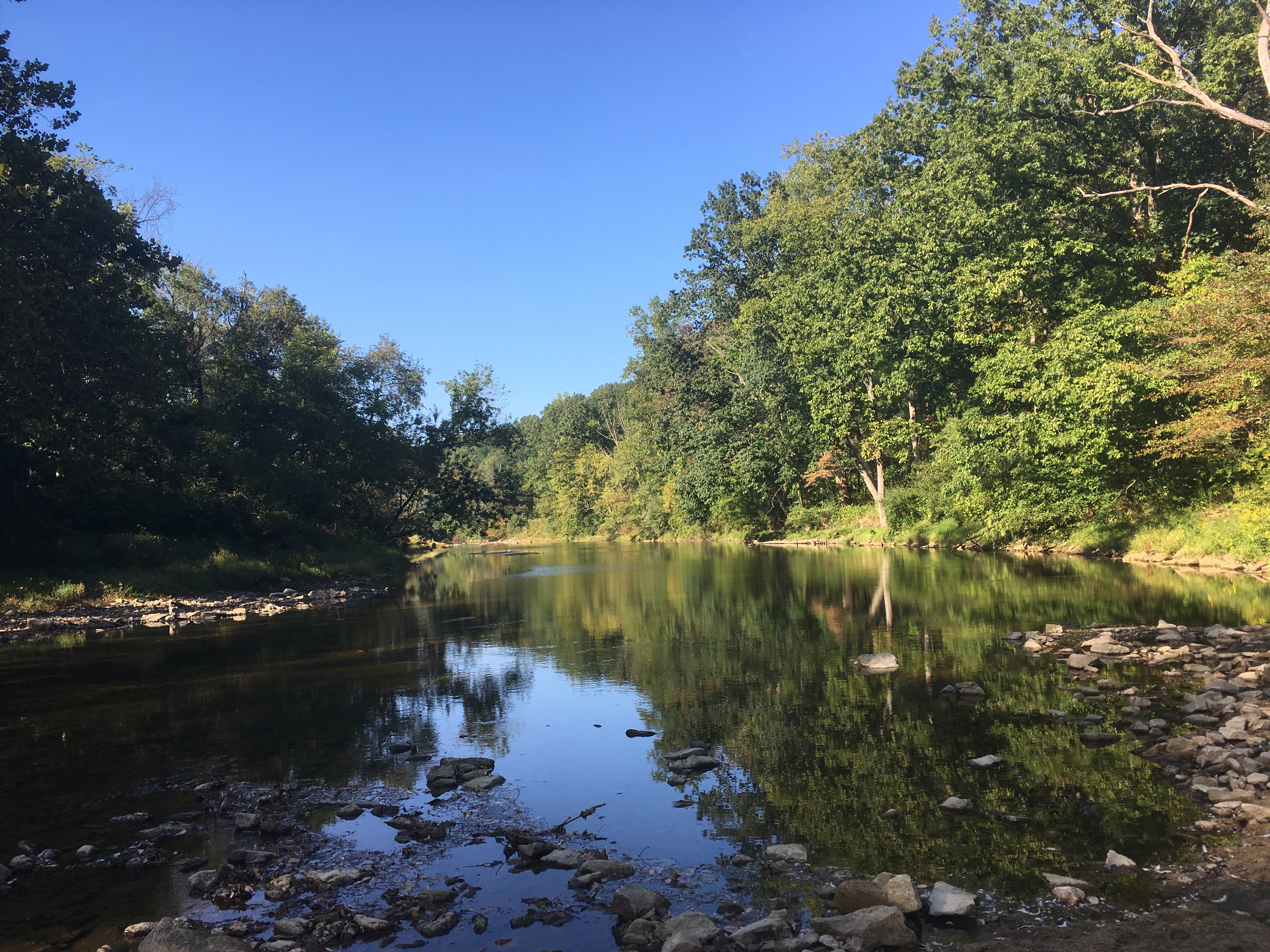
- East Branch Brandywine Creek north of Downingtown

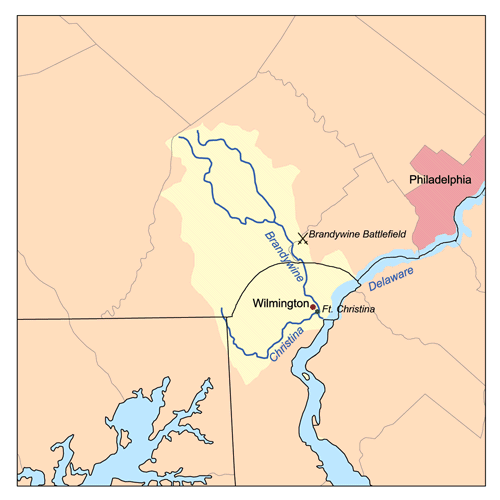
- Christina River Basin, including East Branch Brandywine Creek

Location
- Country: United States
- State: Pennsylvania
- County: Chester
- City: Downingtown

Physical characteristics
- Source
  - location: Honey Brook Township, Chester County, Pennsylvania
  - coordinates: 40°07′09″N 75°53′15″W
  - elevation: 660 ft (200 m)
- Mouth: Brandywine Creek
  - location: East Bradford Township, Chester County, Pennsylvania
  - coordinates: 39°55′21″N 75°38′58″W
  - elevation: 174 ft (53 m)

The East Branch Brandywine Creek is a 27.4-mile-long (44.1 km) tributary of Brandywine Creek in Chester County, Pennsylvania in the United States.

== Course ==
The creek starts in Suplee near Honey Brook, and joins the West Branch Brandywine Creek in Lenape. From its source, the creek flows east, then southeast, passing through the borough of Downingtown. The creek starts at an elevation of 660 feet (200 m) above sea level drops to an elevation of 174 feet (53 m) at its confluence with the West Branch.

== Natural history ==
Average annual precipitation is 43.3 inches (1,100 mm).

The East Brandywine is known for its fish. The game species are Rainbow trout, Brown trout, Brook trout, Smallmouth bass, Largemouth bass, Bluegill, Common carp. White Suckers and Creek Chub are also very common.

== History ==
The East Brandywine served as a source of energy for hundreds of years. The waters also powered many factories in Downingtown.

Gibson's Covered Bridge crosses between East Bradford Township and West Bradford Township.

== See also ==
- List of rivers of Pennsylvania
