= List of places in Pennsylvania: N =

This list of cities, towns, unincorporated communities, counties, and other recognized places in the U.S. state of Pennsylvania also includes information on the number and names of counties in which the place lies, and its lower and upper zip code bounds, if applicable.

Name of place	Number of counties	Principal county	Lower zip code	Upper zip code
Naces Corner	1	Bucks County		
Nacetown	1	Lebanon County		
Naceville	2	Bucks County	18960	
Naceville	2	Montgomery County	18960	
Nadine	1	Allegheny County	15147	
Naginey	1	Mifflin County	17063	
Nagle Road	1	Erie County	16510	
Nagles Crossroad	1	Cambria County	16668	
Nan Lynn Gardens	1	Bucks County	18974	
Nansen	1	Elk County	16735	
Nanticoke	1	Luzerne County	18634	
Nantilly	1	Cumberland County		
Nantmeal Village	1	Chester County	19343	
Nanty Glo	1	Cambria County	15943	
Naomi	1	Berks County		
Naomi	1	Fayette County	15438	
Naomi Pines	1	Monroe County		
Napier	1	Bedford County		
Napier Township	1	Bedford County		
Napierville	1	Lancaster County	17522	
Narberth	1	Montgomery County	19072	
Narbrook Park	1	Montgomery County	19072	
Narrows Creek	1	Clearfield County	15801	
Narrowsville	1	Bucks County		
Narvon	1	Lancaster County	17555	
Nashua	1	Lawrence County		
Nashville	1	Indiana County	15771	
Nashville	1	York County	17362	
Nassau Village	1	Delaware County	19078	
Natalie	1	Northumberland County	17851	
National Hill	1	Allegheny County	15031	
Natrona	1	Allegheny County	15065	
Natrona Heights	1	Allegheny County	15065	
Naumanstown	1	Lancaster County		
Nauvoo	1	Tioga County	16938	
Nauvoo (or Navoo)	1	York County		
Navarro	1	Northampton County	18067	
Nazareth	1	Northampton County	18064	
Nealeys	1	Butler County		
Nealmont	1	Blair County	16686	
Neason Hill	1	Crawford County	16335	
Neath	1	Bradford County	18829	
Nebbons Hill	1	Crawford County		
Nebo	1	Fayette County		
Nebo	1	Greene County		
Nebraska	1	Forest County		
Nebraska	1	Lackawanna County		
Nectarine	1	Venango County	16038	
Ned	1	Greene County	15352	
Needful	1	Clearfield County	16881	
Needmore	1	Fulton County	17238	
Neelyton	1	Huntingdon County	17239	
Neff	1	Huntingdon County		
Neffs	1	Lehigh County	18065	
Neffs Mills	1	Huntingdon County	16669	
Neffsville	1	Lancaster County	17601	
Neiffer	1	Montgomery County	19473	
Neiltown	1	Forest County	16341	
Neiman	1	York County	17327	
Nekoda	1	Perry County		
Nellie	1	Fayette County	15486	
Nelson	1	Tioga County	16940	
Nelson Township	1	Tioga County		
Nemacolin	1	Greene County	15351	
Neola	1	Monroe County	18360	
Nesbit Corners	1	Mercer County		
Nescopeck	1	Luzerne County	18635	
Nescopeck Pass	1	Luzerne County		
Nescopeck Township	1	Luzerne County		
Neshaminy	1	Bucks County	18976	
Neshaminy Falls	1	Bucks County	19047	
Neshaminy Hills	1	Bucks County	19047	19053
Neshaminy Valley	1	Bucks County	19020	
Neshaminy Woods	1	Bucks County	19047	
Neshannock	1	Lawrence County	16105	
Neshannock	1	Mercer County		
Neshannock Falls	1	Lawrence County	16156	
Neshannock Township	1	Lawrence County		
Nesquehoning	1	Carbon County	18240	
Nesquehoning Junction	1	Carbon County		
Nether Providence Township	1	Delaware County		
Nettle Hill	1	Greene County		
Nettleton	1	Cambria County		
Neversink	1	Berks County		
Neville Island	1	Allegheny County	15225	
Neville Township	1	Allegheny County		
New Albany	1	Bradford County	18833	
New Alexandria	1	Westmoreland County	15670	
New Athens	1	Clarion County		
New Baltimore	1	Somerset County	15553	
New Baltimore	1	York County	17331	
New Beaver	1	Lawrence County		
New Bedford	1	Lawrence County		
New Berlin	1	Union County	17855	
New Berlinville	1	Berks County	19545	
New Bethlehem	1	Clarion County	16242	
New Bloomfield	1	Perry County	17068	
New Boston	1	Schuylkill County	17958	
New Boston-Morea	1	Schuylkill County	17948	
New Bridgeville	1	York County	17356	
New Brighton	1	Beaver County	15066	
New Britain	1	Bucks County	18901	
New Britain Township	1	Bucks County		
New Buena Vista	1	Bedford County	15550	
New Buffalo	1	Perry County	17069	
New Castle	1	Lawrence County	16101	08
New Castle Junction	1	Lawrence County		
New Castle Northwest	1	Lawrence County	16101	
New Castle Township	1	Schuylkill County		
New Castle West	1	Lawrence County	16101	
New Centerville	1	Chester County		
New Centerville	1	Somerset County	15557	
New Chester	1	Adams County	17350	
New Columbia	1	Union County	17856	
New Columbus	1	Carbon County	18240	
New Columbus	1	Luzerne County	17878	
New Cumberland	1	Cumberland County	17070	
New Cumberland Army Depot	1	York County	17070	
New Danville	1	Lancaster County	17603	
New Derry	1	Westmoreland County	15671	
New Eagle	1	Washington County	15067	
New England	1	Allegheny County		
New Enterprise	1	Bedford County	16664	
New Era	1	Bradford County	18833	
New Florence	1	Westmoreland County	15944	
New Franklin	1	Franklin County	17201	
New Freedom	1	York County	17349	
New Freeport	1	Greene County	15352	
New Galena	1	Bucks County	18914	
New Galilee	1	Beaver County	16141	
New Garden	1	Chester County	19374	
New Garden Township	1	Chester County		
New Geneva	1	Fayette County	15467	
New Germantown	1	Perry County	17071	
New Germany	1	Cambria County	15946	
New Grenada	1	Fulton County	16674	
New Hamburg	1	Mercer County	16124	
New Hanover	1	Montgomery County	19525	
New Hanover Square	1	Montgomery County	19435	
New Hanover Township	1	Montgomery County		
New Hensingerville	1	Lehigh County		
New Holland	1	Lancaster County	17557	
New Homestead	1	Allegheny County		
New Hope	1	Bucks County	18938	
New Ireland	1	Erie County	16438	
New Jerusalem	1	Berks County	19522	
New Kensington	1	Westmoreland County	15068	
New Kingstown	1	Cumberland County	17072	
New Lancaster	1	Cumberland County		
New Lebanon	1	Mercer County	16145	
New Lexington	1	Somerset County	15557	
New London	1	Chester County	19360	
New London	1	Clearfield County	16627	
New London	1	Warren County	16351	
New London Township	1	Chester County		
New Mahoning	1	Carbon County	18235	
New Market	1	York County	17070	
New Milford	1	Susquehanna County	18834	
New Milford Township	1	Susquehanna County		
New Millport	1	Clearfield County	16861	
New Milltown	1	Lancaster County	17535	
New Mines	1	Schuylkill County	17923	
New Morgan	1	Berks County		
New Oxford	1	Adams County	17350	
New Paris	1	Bedford County	15554	
New Park	1	York County	17352	
New Philadelphia	1	Schuylkill County	17959	
New Portage Junction	1	Blair County		
New Providence	1	Lancaster County	17560	
New Richmond	1	Crawford County	16327	
New Ringgold	1	Schuylkill County	17960	
New Salem	1	Armstrong County		
New Salem	1	Fayette County	15468	
New Salem	1	Westmoreland County		
New Salem	1	York County	17371	
New Salem-Buffington	1	Fayette County		
New Schaefferstown	1	Berks County	19506	
New Sewickley Township	1	Beaver County		
New Sheffield	1	Beaver County	15001	
New Smithville	1	Lehigh County	19530	
New Stanton	1	Westmoreland County	15672	
New Street	1	Schuylkill County	17901	
New Texas	1	Allegheny County	15239	
New Texas	1	Lancaster County	17563	
New Town	1	Centre County	16666	
New Tripoli	1	Lehigh County	18066	
New Vernon	1	Mercer County	16145	
New Vernon Township	1	Mercer County		
New Virginia	1	Mercer County	16146	
New Washington	1	Clearfield County	15757	
New Wilmington	1	Lawrence County	16142	
Newberry	1	Lycoming County	17701	
Newberry Junction	1	Lycoming County		
Newberry Township	1	York County		
Newberrytown	1	York County	17319	
Newboro	1	Fayette County	15468	
Newbridge	1	Franklin County		
Newburg	1	Blair County	16601	
Newburg	1	Clearfield County	15753	
Newburg	1	Cumberland County	17240	
Newburg	1	Huntingdon County		
Newburg	1	Northampton County	18064	
Newburg Homes	1	Northampton County	18042	18045
Newcomer	1	Fayette County	15401	
Newell	1	Fayette County	15466	
Newelltown	1	Tioga County		
Newfield	1	Allegheny County	15147	
Newfield	1	Potter County	16948	
Newfield Junction	1	Potter County	16923	
Newfoundland	1	Wayne County	18445	
Newhard	1	Lehigh County	18080	
Newkirk	1	Schuylkill County	18252	
Newlin	1	Columbia County	17820	
Newlin Township	1	Chester County		
Newlinville	1	Chester County		
Newlonsburg	1	Westmoreland County	15632	
Newmanstown	1	Lebanon County	17073	
Newmansville	1	Clarion County	16353	
Newport	1	Lawrence County	16157	
Newport	1	Perry County	17074	
Newport Center	1	Luzerne County		
Newport Township	1	Luzerne County		
Newportville	1	Bucks County	19056	
Newportville Terrace	1	Bucks County	19020	
Newry	1	Blair County	16665	
Newside	1	Lehigh County	18080	
Newton	1	Luzerne County		
Newton	1	Schuylkill County		
Newton Center	1	Lackawanna County		
Newton Hamilton	1	Mifflin County	17075	
Newton Junction	1	Schuylkill County		
Newton Lake	1	Lackawanna County	18407	
Newton Township	1	Lackawanna County		
Newtonburg	1	Clearfield County	15757	
Newtown	1	Allegheny County		
Newtown	1	Bucks County	18940	
Newtown	1	Cambria County		
Newtown	1	Clearfield County	16878	
Newtown	1	Greene County		
Newtown	1	Lancaster County	17512	
Upper Macungie Township	1	Lehigh County	18031	
Newtown	1	Luzerne County	18706	
Newtown	1	Schuylkill County		
Newtown Grant	1	Bucks County		
Newtown Heights	1	Delaware County	19073	
Newtown Square	1	Delaware County	19073	
Newtown Township	1	Bucks County		
Newtown Township	1	Delaware County		
Newville	1	Bucks County	18914	
Newville	1	Cumberland County	17241	
Newville	1	Lancaster County	17023	
Niagara	1	Wayne County	18453	
Niantic	1	Montgomery County	19504	
Nicetown	1	Philadelphia County	19140	
Nichola	1	Armstrong County		
Nicholson	1	Wyoming County	18446	
Nicholson Township	1	Fayette County		
Nicholson Township	1	Wyoming County		
Nickel Mines	1	Lancaster County	17562	
Nickleville	1	Venango County	16373	
Nicklin	1	Venango County	16323	
Nicktown	1	Cambria County	15762	
Nicodemus	1	Franklin County		
Nilan	1	Fayette County	15439	
Niles	1	Venango County	16323	
Niles Valley	1	Tioga County	16935	
Nine Row	1	Cambria County	15927	
Ninepoints	1	Lancaster County	17509	
Nineveh	1	Clarion County	17921	
Nineveh	1	Greene County	15353	
Nippenose Township	1	Lycoming County		
Nisbet	1	Lycoming County	17759	
Nittany	1	Centre County	16841	
Niver Junction	1	Somerset County		
Niverton	1	Somerset County	15558	
Nixon	1	Butler County	16001	
Nixon	1	Susquehanna County		
Noble	1	Montgomery County	19046	
Noblestown	1	Allegheny County	15071	
Nockamixon Township	1	Bucks County		
Noel	1	Cambria County		
Nolo	1	Indiana County	15765	
Nolton	1	Washington County		
Nook	1	Juniata County	17058	
Nordmont	1	Sullivan County	17758	
Normal	1	Carbon County	18235	
Normal Square	1	Carbon County		
Normalville	1	Fayette County	15469	
Norman	1	Jefferson County		
Normandy	1	Philadelphia County		
Norris	1	Philadelphia County		
Norristown	1	Montgomery County	19401	09
Norrisville	1	Crawford County	16406	
Norritonville	1	Montgomery County		
North Abington Township	1	Lackawanna County		
North Annville Township	1	Lebanon County		
North Apollo	1	Armstrong County	15673	
North Ardmore	1	Montgomery County	19003	
North Aronimink	1	Delaware County	19082	
North Bangor	1	Northampton County	18013	
North Barnesboro	1	Cambria County	15714	
North Beaver Township	1	Lawrence County		
North Belle Vernon	1	Westmoreland County	15012	
North Bend	1	Clinton County	17760	
North Bessemer	1	Allegheny County	15235	
North Bethlehem Township	1	Washington County		
North Bingham	1	Potter County	16923	
North Braddock	1	Allegheny County	15104	
North Branch Township	1	Wyoming County		
North Buffalo	1	Armstrong County		
North Buffalo Township	1	Armstrong County		
North Butler	1	Butler County	16001	
North Catasauqua	1	Northampton County	18032	
North Centre Township	1	Columbia County		
North Charleroi	1	Washington County	15022	
North Clarion Junction	1	Clarion County		
North Codorus Township	1	York County		
North Connellsville	1	Fayette County	15425	
North Coplay	1	Lehigh County		
North Cornwall	1	Lebanon County	17042	
North Cornwall Township	1	Lebanon County		
North Coventry Township	1	Chester County		
North East	1	Erie County	16428	
North East Township	1	Erie County		
North Edinburg	1	Lawrence County	16116	
North End	1	Luzerne County	18705	
North Essington	1	Delaware County	19029	
North Fayette Township	1	Allegheny County		
North Fogelsville	1	Lehigh County	18031	
North Fork	1	Potter County	16950	
North Franklin Township	1	Washington County		
North Fredericktown	1	Washington County	15333	
North Freedom	2	Armstrong County	16240	
North Freedom	2	Jefferson County	16240	
North Ghent	1	Bradford County		
North Girard	1	Erie County		
North Glenside	1	Montgomery County		
North Hamilton	1	Bucks County	18901	
North Heidelberg	1	Berks County	19506	
North Heidelberg Township	1	Berks County		
North Hills	1	Montgomery County	19038	
North Hills	1	Northumberland County		
North Hopewell Township	1	York County		
North Huntingdon	1	Westmoreland County	15642	
North Huntingdon Township	1	Westmoreland County		
North Irwin	1	Westmoreland County	15642	
North Jackson	1	Susquehanna County	18847	
North Larchmont	1	Delaware County	19073	
North Lebanon Township	1	Lebanon County		
North Liberty	1	Mercer County	16127	
North Londonderry Township	1	Lebanon County		
North McKees Rocks	1	Allegheny County	15136	
North Mahoning Township	1	Indiana County		
North Manheim Township	1	Schuylkill County		
North Manor	1	Fayette County		
North Mehoopany	1	Wyoming County	18629	
North Middleton Township	1	Cumberland County		
North Mills	1	Mercer County		
North Mountain	1	Lycoming County	17758	
North Newton Township	1	Cumberland County		
North Oakland	1	Butler County	16025	
North Orwell	1	Bradford County	18837	
North Park	1	Bucks County		
North Philadelphia	1	Philadelphia County	19132	
North Philipsburg	1	Centre County	16866	
North Pine Grove	1	Clarion County	16260	
North Point	1	Bedford County	16679	
North Point	1	Indiana County		
North Radcliffe	1	Bucks County	19007	
North Reading	1	Berks County		
North Rochester	1	Beaver County	15074	
North Rome	1	Bradford County	18854	
North Sandy	2	Mercer County		
North Sandy	2	Venango County		
North Scottdale	1	Westmoreland County	15683	
North Scranton	1	Lackawanna County	18508	
North Sewickley	1	Beaver County	16117	
North Sewickley Township	1	Beaver County		
North Shenango Township	1	Crawford County		
North Side	1	Allegheny County		
North Springfield	1	Erie County	16430	
North Strabane Township	1	Washington County		
North Sulger	1	Jefferson County		
North Towanda	1	Bradford County	18848	
North Towanda Township	1	Bradford County		
North Union Township	1	Fayette County		
North Union Township	1	Schuylkill County		
North Vandergrift	1	Armstrong County	15690	
North Vandergrift-Pleasant View	1	Armstrong County		
North Versailles	1	Allegheny County	15137	
North Versailles Township	1	Allegheny County		
North Wales	1	Montgomery County	19454	
North Warren	1	Warren County	16365	
North Washington	1	Butler County	16048	
North Washington	1	Westmoreland County	15613	
North Water Gap	1	Monroe County		
North Waynesburg	1	Greene County	17268	
North Weissport	1	Carbon County	18235	
North Whitehall Township	1	Lehigh County		
North Woodbury Township	1	Blair County		
North York	1	York County	17404	
Northampton	1	Northampton County	18067	
Northampton Hills	1	Bucks County	18966	
Northampton Township	1	Bucks County		
Northampton Township	1	Somerset County		
Northbrook	1	Chester County	19380	
Northbrook Hills	1	Lancaster County	17601	
Northeast Madison Township	1	Perry County		
Northeast Village	1	Philadelphia County		
Northern Cambria	1	Cambria County	15714	
Northmont	1	Berks County		
Northmoreland Township	1	Wyoming County		
Northpoint	1	Indiana County	15763	
Northumberland	1	Northumberland County	17857	
Northvue	1	Butler County	16001	
Northwest	1	Centre County	16801	
Northwest Harborcreek	1	Erie County		
Northwood	1	Blair County	16686	
Northwood Heights	1	Northampton County	18024	
Norvelt	1	Westmoreland County	15674	
Norwegian Township	1	Schuylkill County		
Norwich Township	1	McKean County		
Norwin Heights	1	Westmoreland County	15642	
Norwood	1	Allegheny County	15136	
Norwood	1	Delaware County	19074	
Norwood Acres	1	Delaware County	19074	
Norwood Park	1	Delaware County	19074	
Nossville	1	Huntingdon County	17213	
Notre Dame Hills	1	Lehigh County		
Nottingham	1	Bucks County	19020	
Nottingham	1	Chester County	19362	
Nottingham Township	1	Washington County		
Nova	1	Franklin County		
Nowrytown	1	Indiana County	15681	
Noxen	1	Wyoming County	18636	
Noxen Township	1	Wyoming County		
Noyes Township	1	Clinton County		
Nu Mine	1	Armstrong County	16244	
Nuangola	1	Luzerne County	18637	
Nuangola Station	1	Luzerne County	18707	
Numidia	1	Columbia County	17858	
Nuremberg	1	Schuylkill County	18241	
Nyesville	1	Franklin County	17201	
