= Pennsylvania Dutch Country =

Pennsylvania Dutch Country Pennsylvanie Deitschland
- Region of Pennsylvania
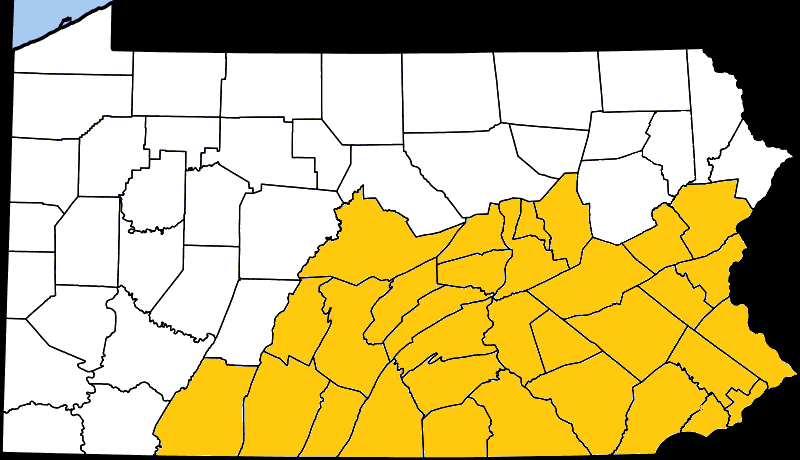
- German (High-Dutch) Pennsylvania

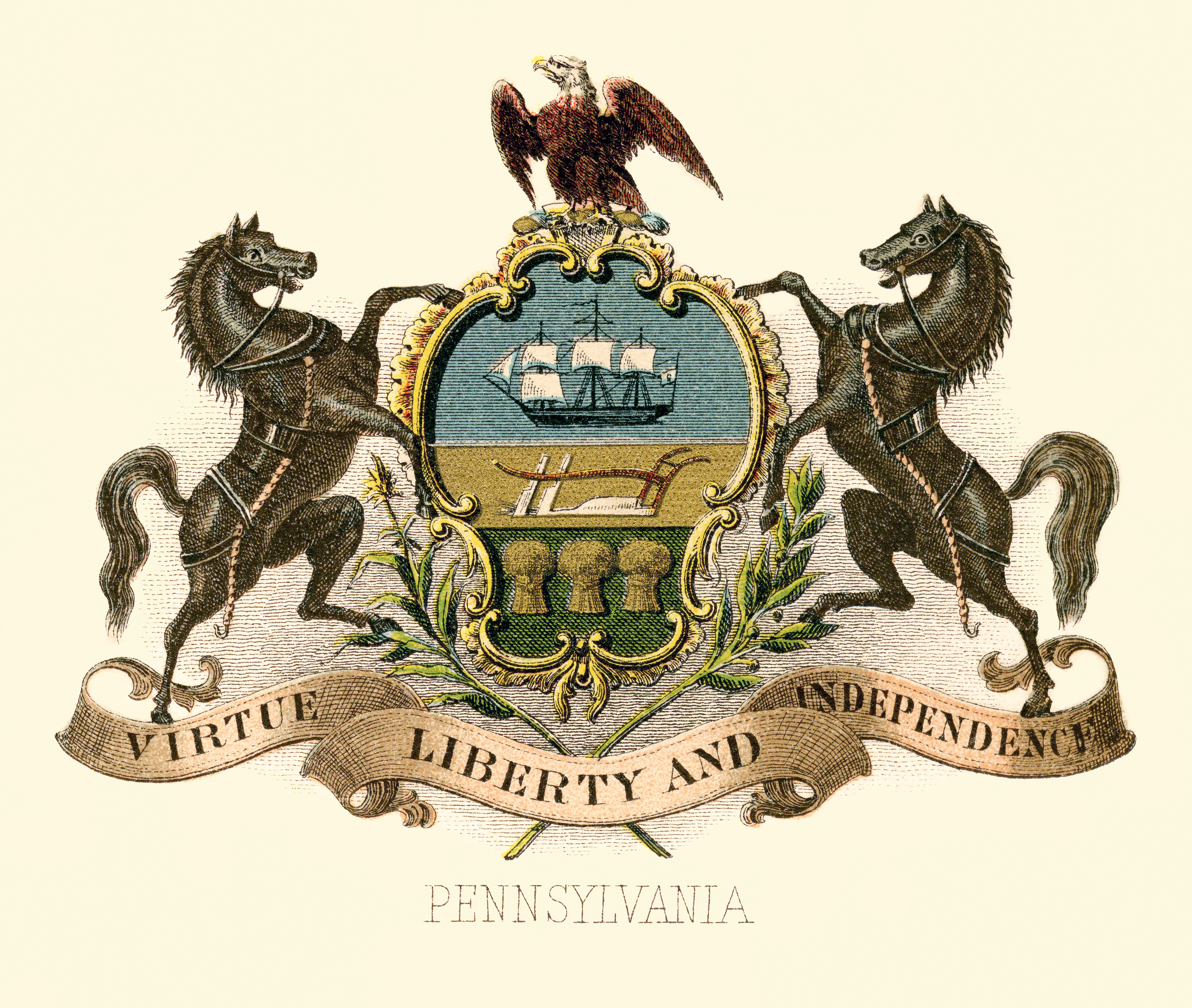
- Flag

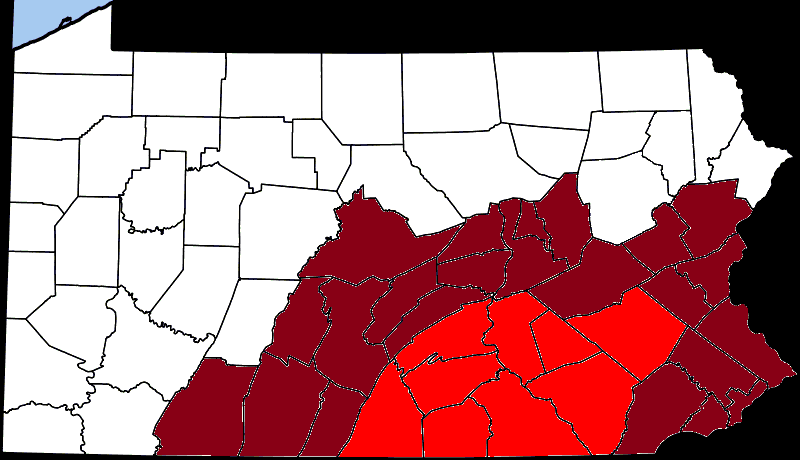
- Map of the Pennsylvania Dutch Country (red)

- Location of Pennsylvania within the United States
- Country: United States
- State: Pennsylvania
- Demonym: Pennsylvania Dutchlander

The Pennsylvania Dutch Country (Pennsylvania Dutch: Pennsylvanie Deitschland, Deitscherei, or Pennsilfaanisch-Deitschland), or Pennsylvania Dutchland, is a region of German Pennsylvania spanning the Delaware Valley and South Central and Northeastern regions of Pennsylvania.

By the American Revolution in the 18th century, the region had a high percentage of Pennsylvania Dutch inhabitants. Religiously, they were predominantly Lutherans but also included German Reformed, Moravian, Amish, Mennonite, Schwarzenau Brethren, and other German Christian denominations. Catholics settled around early Jesuit missions in Conewago near Hanover and Goshenhoppen, now known as Bally. The term was used in the middle of the 20th century as a description of a region with a distinctive Pennsylvania Dutch culture, but in recent decades the composition of the population is changing and the phrase is used more now in a tourism context than any other.

The Greater Pennsylvania Dutch Country (Pennsylvania Dutch: Die Breet-Deitscherei (The Broad Dutchery) refers to this Pennsylvania region but also includes smaller enclaves of Pennsylvania Dutch-speaking areas in New York, Delaware, Maryland, Ohio, West Virginia, North Carolina, Indiana, Illinois, Wisconsin, Virginia, and the Canadian province of Ontario.

== High-Dutch Pennsylvania ==
A Pennsylvania Dutch windmill restaurant in Lancaster

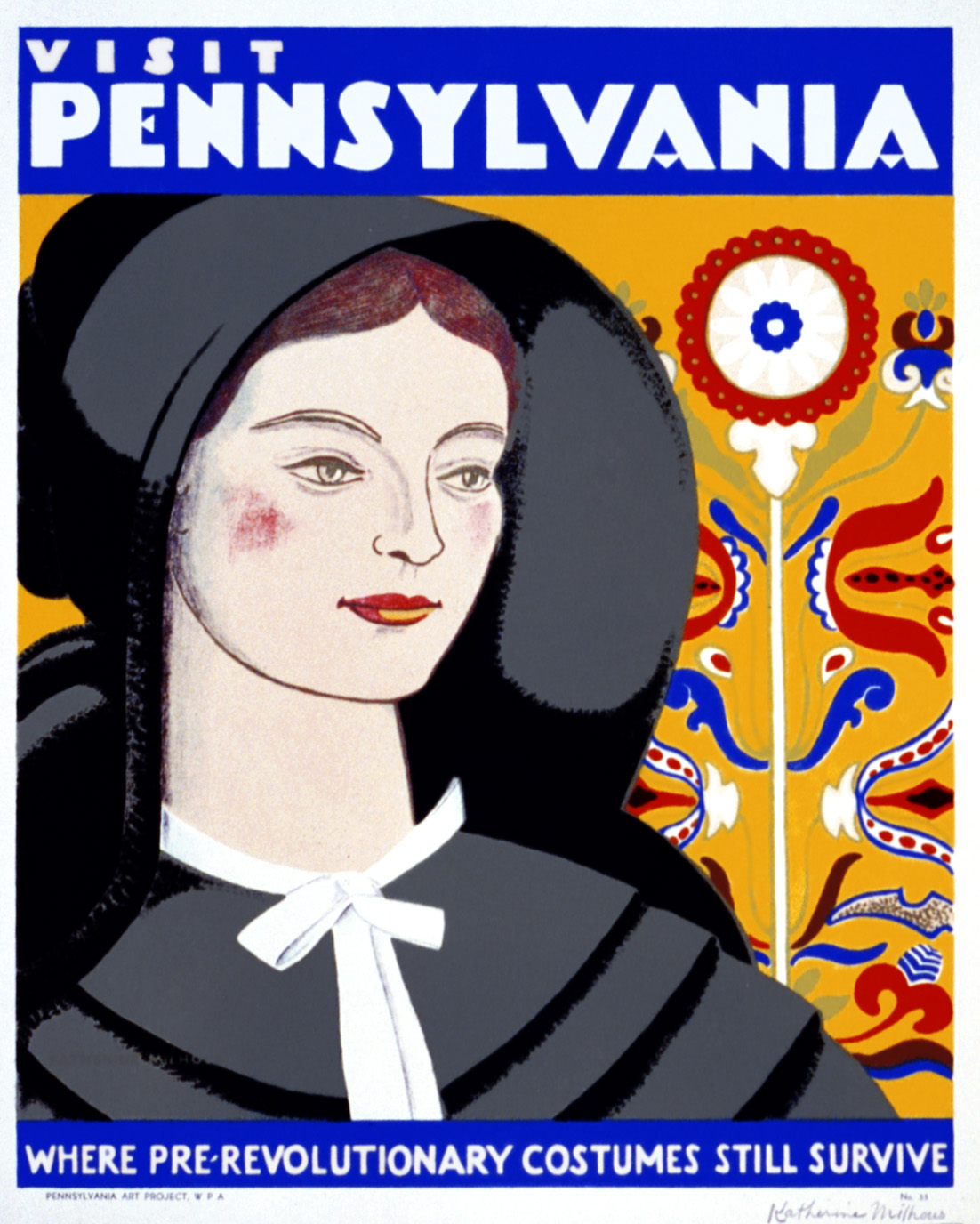
A Pennsylvania Dutch woman on a Works Progress Administration tourism poster for the Dutch Country

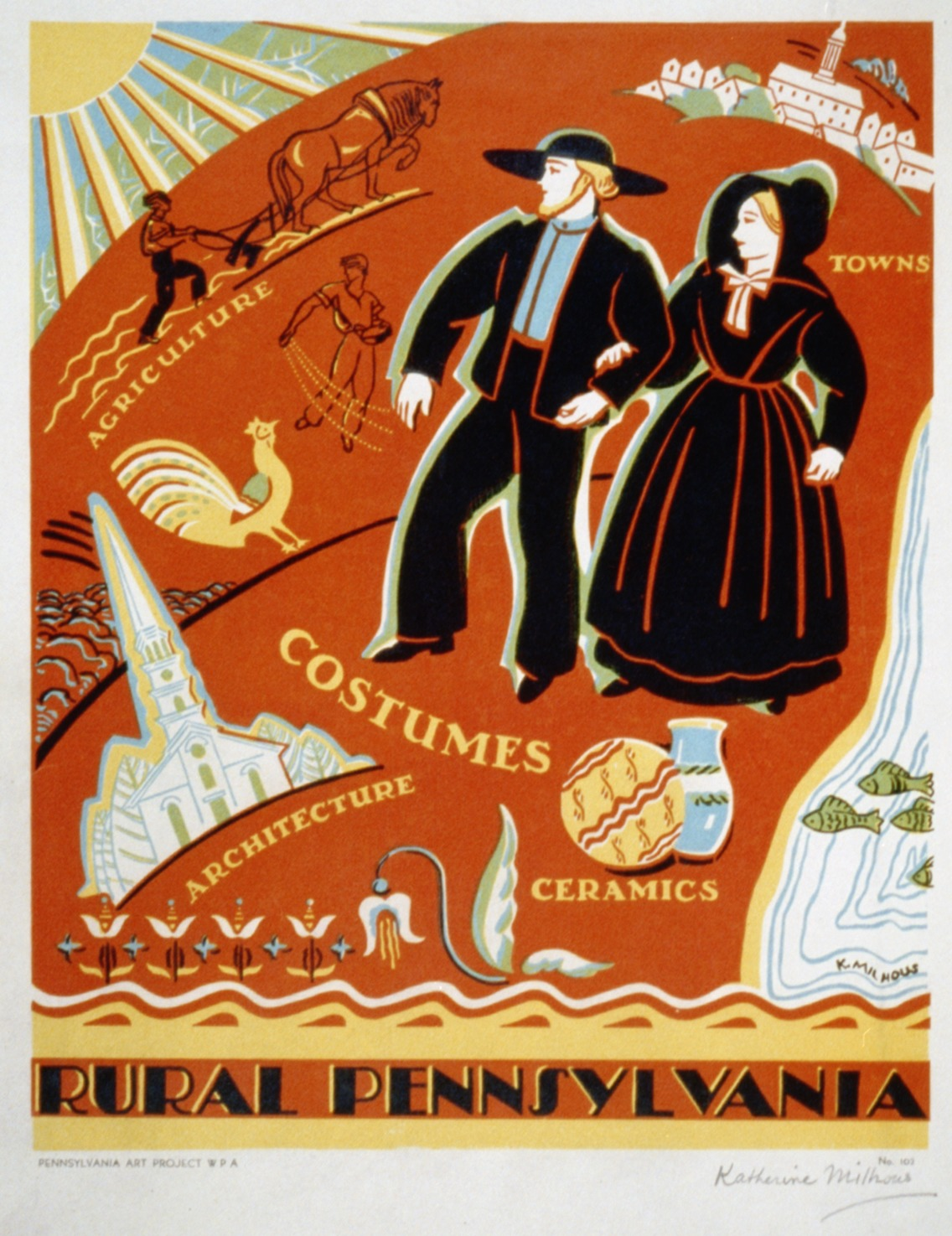
A depiction of Dutchlanders

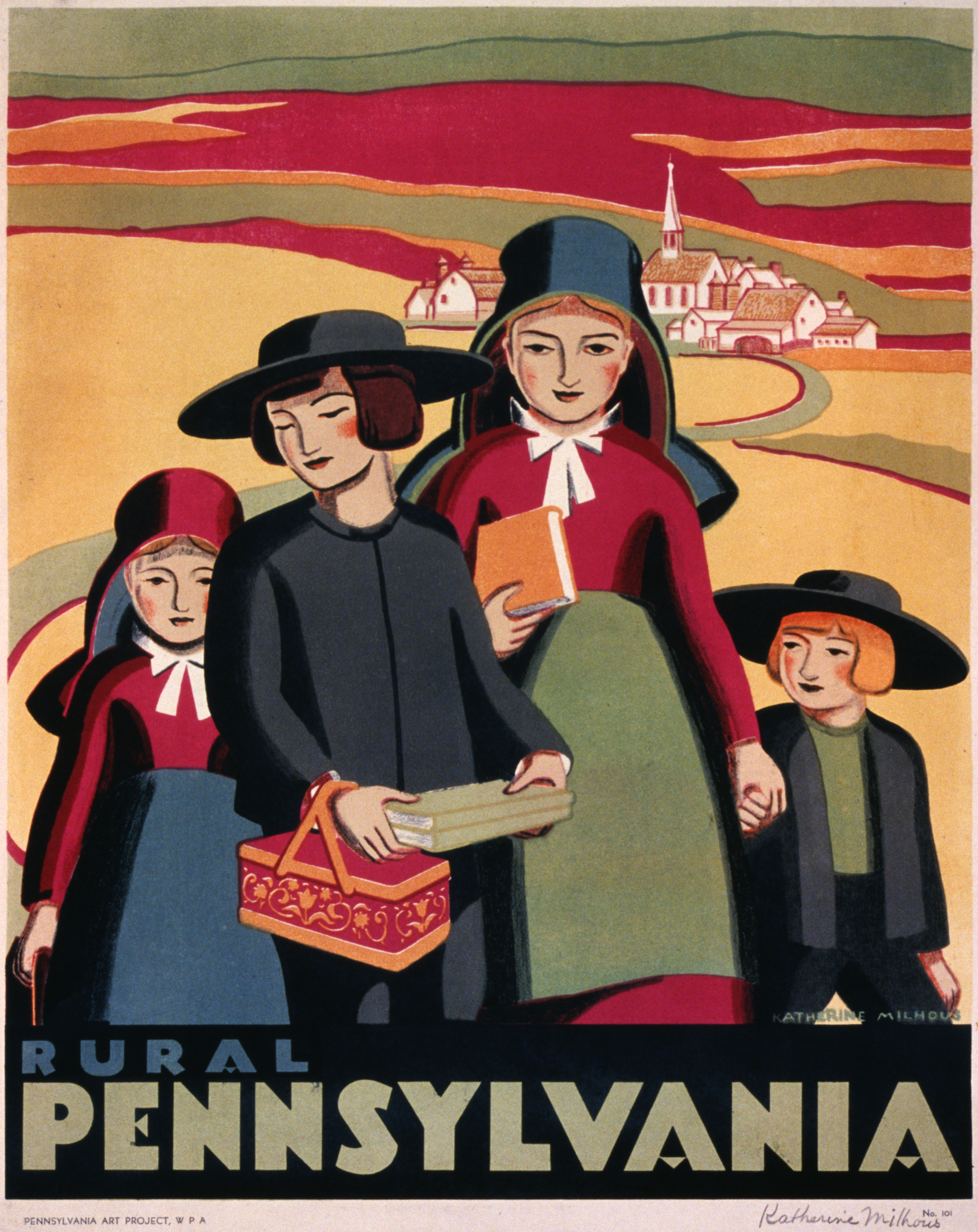
Dutchlanders

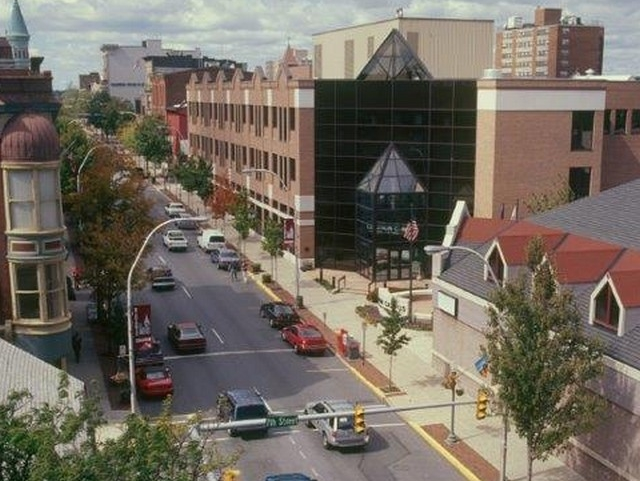
Lebanon, a Fancy Dutch city

Waves of colonial Palatines from the Rhenish Palatinate, one of the Holy Roman states, settled in the Province of New York and the Province of Pennsylvania. The first Palatines arrived in the late 1600s but the majority came throughout the 1700s; they were known collectively as the Palatine Dutch. Many American Palatines settled other states, including Ohio and Indiana.

American Palatines continued to use their language as a way of distinguishing themselves from the later (post-1830) waves of German immigrants. to the United States. The Pennsylvania Dutch came to refer to themselves as Deitsche, and called immigrants of German-speaking countries and territories in Europe Deitschlenner (literally "Dutchlanders"; compare German: Deutschländer), which translates to "European Germans", whom they saw as a distinct group.

These European Germans immigrated to Pennsylvania Dutch cities, where many came to prominence in matters of the church, newspapers and urban business. After the 1871 unification of the first German Empire, the term "Dutchlander" came to refer to the nationality of people from the Pennsylvania Dutch Country.

== Geography ==
Geographically the area referred to as Amish/Dutch country centers on the cities of Allentown, Hershey, Lancaster, Reading, and York. Pennsylvania Dutch Country encompasses the counties of Lancaster, York, Adams, Franklin, Dauphin, Cumberland, Lebanon, Berks, Northampton, Montgomery, Lehigh, Schuylkill, Snyder, Union, Juniata, Mifflin, Huntingdon, Northumberland, and Centre. Pennsylvania Dutch immigrants would spread from this area outwards outside the Pennsylvania borders between the mountains along river valleys into neighboring Maryland (Washington, Frederick, and Carroll counties), West Virginia, New Jersey (Warren and northern Hunterdon counties), Virginia (Shenandoah Valley), and North Carolina. The larger region has been historically referred to as Greater Pennsylvania. The historic Pennsylvania Dutch diaspora in Ontario, Canada, has been referred to as Little Pennsylvania.

The area lies in the Piedmont region of the Appalachian Mountains. The landscape is marked by rolling, wooded hills, deep stream valleys, and fertile soils. The Susquehanna River bisects the region and provides its drainage.

== History ==
=== 19th century ===
Contrary to popular belief, the word Dutch in Pennsylvania Dutch is not a mistranslation, but rather a variation of the Pennsylvania German endonym Deitsch, which means "Pennsylvania Dutch / German" or "German". Ultimately, the terms Deitsch, Dutch, Diets and Deutsch are all cognates of the Proto-Germanic word *þiudiskaz meaning "popular" or "of the people". The continued use of Pennsylvania Dutch to describe them was strengthened by the Pennsylvania Dutch in the 19th century as a way of distinguishing thems from the later (post-1830) waves of German immigrants to the U.S. Further, the Pennsylvania Dutch referred to themselves as Deitsche and to Germans as Deitschlenner (literally "Germany-ers", compare Deutschland-er) whom they saw as a related but distinct group.

Many Dutchlanders are descendants of Palatine refugees. The German-speaking settlers came from a variety of countries and religious backgrounds, but most became assimilated to Anglo-American language and culture beginning in the second half of the 19th century with English-language evangelism efforts and the outlawing of German-language schooling.

=== 20th century ===
The assimilation process continued soon after the turn of the 20th century with World War I, consolidated schools, and the advent of mandatory public education until the age of 16, with added pressures from increased mobility, the influence of English-language media, communications, and urbanization. Also, many German-Americans hid their ethnicity with the spread of anti-German sentiment and propaganda.

Originally, the economy of the region was almost entirely rural and agricultural, based on the immigrants' dream of bettering their lot through the ownership of their own farms. The small tradesmen indispensable to a rural economy, such as blacksmiths, wheelwrights, millers, and storekeepers, constituted the bulk of the non-farm economy. In the 19th century, a small educated class, comprising the Lutheran and Reformed ministers, began to emerge. The Pennsylvania seminaries educated them in High German so that they could preach to their flocks in a scholarly way.

The advent of the industrial revolution brought technologies based on coal, iron, canals, and railroads, but the Dutch, unversed in English, and lacking connections to the English-speaking establishment, were unable to engage in entrepreneurship on a large scale. Consequently, the large-scale enterprises which came to characterize the industrialized eastern half of the region, such as the Lehigh Coal and Navigation Company (marketer of the coal branded "Old Company's Lehigh"), the Lehigh Valley Railroad, and the Bethlehem Iron Company (later known as Bethlehem Steel) were founded by English speaking residents from the Philadelphia and New York areas. The English-speakers (referred to by the Dutch as simply "the English") dominated the managerial and engineering positions of these companies, and the Dutch supplied the blue collar and supervisory workforce.

As technology advanced, higher technology companies such as Mack Trucks and New Jersey Zinc moved to the region as well. As the local industries expanded, immigrants from Middle Europe (primarily Slovakia, Poland, and Hungary) were recruited for the low-skilled positions, and the more established Dutch retained the skilled blue collar and supervisory positions. The Dutch influence on the shop floor was so great that some Slavic immigrants became bilingual in their native language and in Pennsylvania Dutch while they had not yet mastered English.

A young Amish woman from Lancaster

In the 20th century however, universal public education in English and relatively easy access to higher education erased many of the elements that made the Pennsylvania Dutch Country a distinctive region of the United States. The information age and globalization greatly reduced the dependence of the region on industrial jobs. The Eastern part of the region (Northampton, Lehigh, and Berks Counties) is now dominated by information-intensive white collar employment.

The western counties of the region experienced industrialization as well, with Hershey Foods being the most notable example, but it was less intensive, and agriculture retained a larger share of the economy. In the middle of the 20th century, both Amish and non-Amish entrepreneurs began to promote the area as a tourist destination.

=== 21st century ===
Although there are still plenty of Amish attempting to follow their traditional way of life, tourism and population growth have significantly changed the appearance and cultural flavor of the area. The region is within 50 miles of Philadelphia, Baltimore, Maryland, and Harrisburg, Pennsylvania, and has not escaped the effects of being located on the western edge of the East Coast conurbation which stretches from Washington, D.C. to Boston.

The Old Order Amish and Old Order Mennonites, who have resisted these urbanization efforts most successfully, have retained aspects of their 18th century way of life, including the Deitsch dialect; however, these groups have changed significantly in the last two hundred years. Nevertheless, for the Old Order groups, change has come slower, and gradually they have become more and more distinctively different as the surrounding rural and urban population of Pennsylvania has changed.

== See also ==
- Ohio Amish Country
- Pretzel Belt
- West Nickel Mines School shooting
- Witness (1985 film)

=== Nearby attractions ===
- Crystal Cave in Berks County
- Dutch Wonderland, an amusement park
- Gettysburg National Military Park (nearby)
- Hersheypark in Hershey
- Indian Echo Caverns, Hummelstown
- Koziar's Christmas Village
- Limestone Inn Bed and Breakfast listed in the National Register of Historic Places
- Middletown and Hummelstown Railroad
- Railroad Museum of Pennsylvania
- Roadside America in Shartlesville
- Shady Maple Smorgasbord in East Earl
- Sight & Sound Theatres in Ronks
- Strasburg Rail Road, a steam locomotive-driven heritage railway
- Susquehannock State Park
- Union Canal Tunnel, Lebanon
