= Neola =

Neola may refer to:

Places in the United States

- Neola, Iowa in Pottawattamie County
- Neola, Pennsylvania in Monroe County
- Neola, Utah in Duchesne County
- Neola, West Virginia in Greenbrier County

Other

- Neola (moth), a genus of moths in the family Notodontidae
- Neola, a stringed experimental musical instrument invented in 1970
