= Newtonburg =

Newtonburg may refer to:

== Places ==
United States

- Newtonburg, Pennsylvania, an unincorporated community
- Newtonburg, Wisconsin, an unincorporated community
