= Jefferson Township, Berks County, Pennsylvania =

Township in Pennsylvania, US

Jefferson Township
- Township
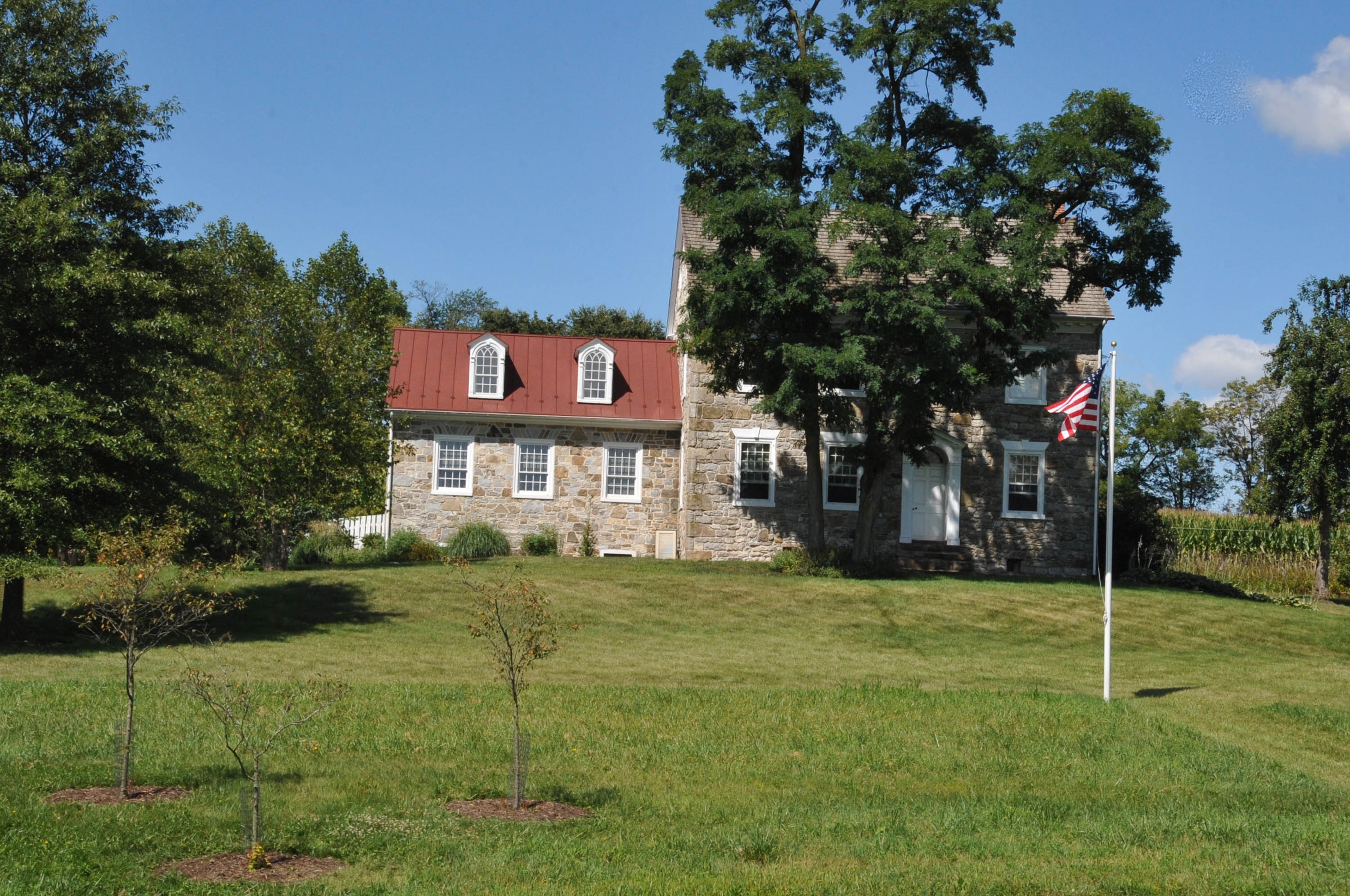
- John Nicholas and Elizabeth Moyer House

- Location of Jefferson Township in Pennsylvania Jefferson Township (the United States)
- Coordinates: 40°26′33″N 76°09′55″W
- Country: United States
- State: Pennsylvania
- County: Berks

Area
  - Total: 16.02 sq mi (41.50 km^{2})
  - Land: 15.91 sq mi (41.21 km^{2})
  - Water: 0.11 sq mi (0.29 km^{2})
- Elevation: 476 ft (145 m)

Population (2020)
  - Total: 2,376
  - Estimate (2021): 2,371
  - Density: 126/sq mi (48.8/km^{2})
- Time zone: UTC-5 (EST)
  - Summer (DST): UTC-4 (EDT)
- Area code: 610
- FIPS code: 42-011-37824
- Website: www.jeffersontwpbc.com

Jefferson Township is a township in Berks County, Pennsylvania, United States. The population was 2,376 at the 2020 census.

== History ==
The John Nicholas and Elizabeth Moyer House was listed on the National Register of Historic Places in 2001.

== Geography ==
According to the U.S. Census Bureau, the township has a total area of 16.1 square miles (42 km^{2}), of which 16.0 square miles (41 km^{2}) is land and 0.1 square miles (0.26 km^{2}) (0.31%) is water. It contains the census-designated place of New Schaefferstown.

Adjacent townships and boroughs

- Upper Tulpehocken Township (north)
- Penn Township & Bernville (east)
- North Heidelberg Township (south)
- Marion Township (southwest)
- Tulpehocken Township (west)

== Demographics ==
Historical population
Census	Pop.	Note	%±
1980	1,310		—
1990	1,410		7.6%
2000	1,604		13.8%
2010	1,977		23.3%
2020	2,376		20.2%
2021 (est.)	2,371		−0.2%
Source: US Census Bureau

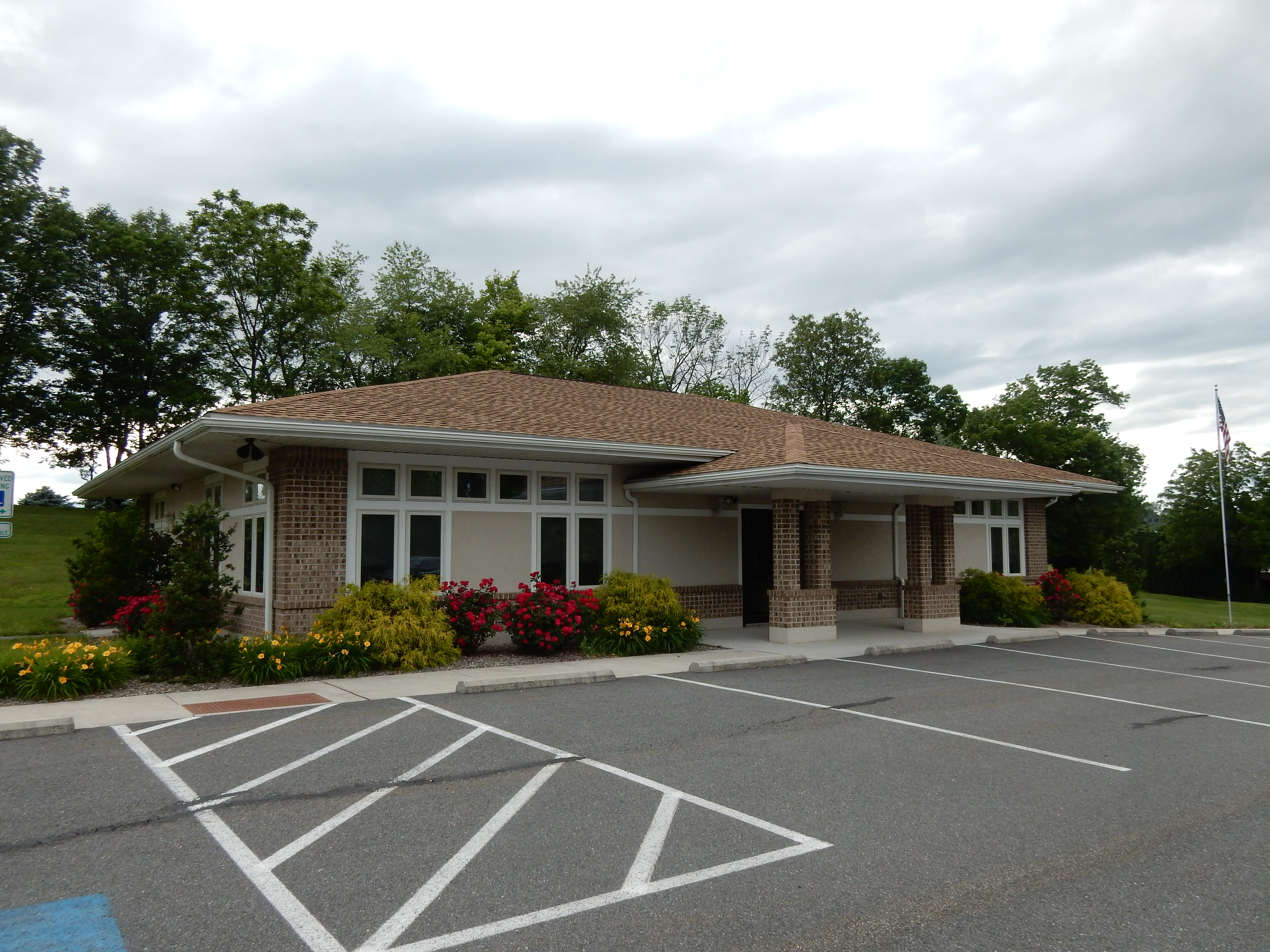
Township Building

At the 2000 census there were 1,604 people, 580 households, and 444 families living in the township. The population density was 99.9 inhabitants per square mile (38.6/km^{2}). There were 602 housing units at an average density of 37.5 per square mile (14.5/km^{2}). The racial makeup of the township was 98.63% White, 0.12% African American, 0.06% Native American, 0.12% Asian, 0.06% from other races, and 1.00% from two or more races. Hispanic or Latino of any race were 0.87%.

There were 580 households, 33.1% had children under the age of 18 living with them, 67.8% were married couples living together, 5.0% had a female householder with no husband present, and 23.3% were non-families. 17.9% of households were made up of individuals, and 8.1% were one person aged 65 or older. The average household size was 2.77 and the average family size was 3.16.

The age distribution was 26.5% under the age of 18, 6.4% from 18 to 24, 27.3% from 25 to 44, 26.3% from 45 to 64, and 13.5% 65 or older. The median age was 39 years. For every 100 females, there were 103.6 males. For every 100 females age 18 and over, there were 100.9 males.

The median household income was $51,532 and the median family income was $56,484. Males had a median income of $38,125 versus $26,591 for females. The per capita income for the township was $22,584. About 3.6% of families and 7.3% of the population were below the poverty line, including 9.8% of those under age 18 and 13.3% of those age 65 or over.

== Attractions ==
Jefferson Township is the location of Koziar's Christmas Village, a seasonal attraction frequently voted among the best outdoor displays of Christmas lights in the world.

== Transportation ==
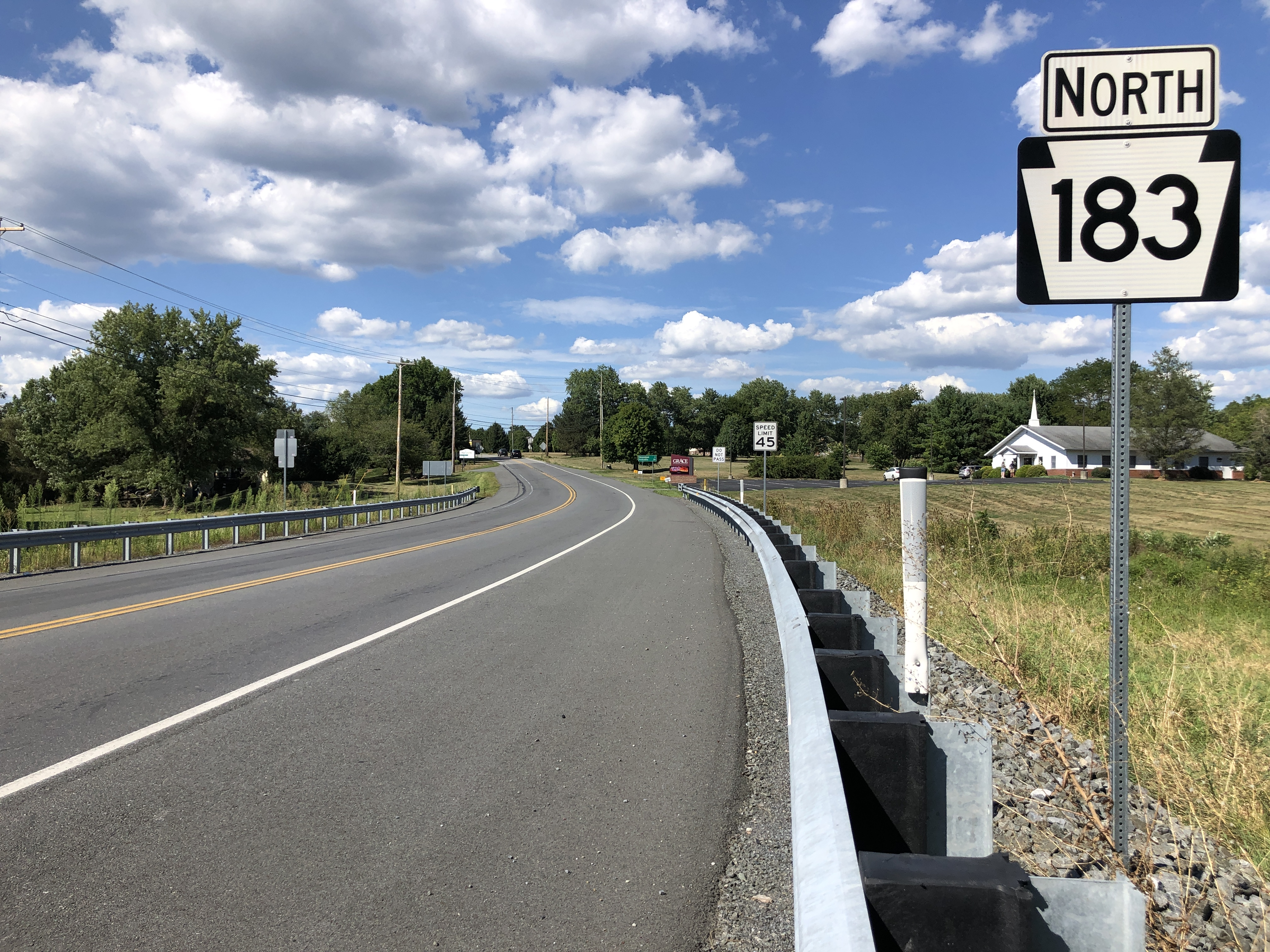
PA 183 northbound in Jefferson Township

As of 2020, there were 44.43 miles (71.50 km) of public roads in Jefferson Township, of which 15.29 miles (24.61 km) were maintained by the Pennsylvania Department of Transportation (PennDOT) and 29.14 miles (46.90 km) were maintained by the township.

Pennsylvania Route 183 is the only numbered highway serving Jefferson Township. It follows Bernville Road along a northwest–southeast alignment across the northeastern portion of the township.
