= Neshannock Township School District =

School district in Pennsylvania, USA

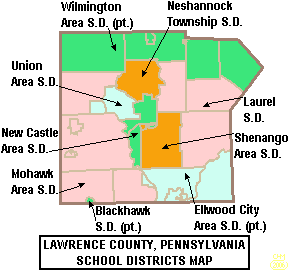

Address
- 3834 Mitchell Road New Castle, Pennsylvania, 16105; United States

District information
- Type: Public
- Grades: K–12
- NCES District ID: 4216440

Students and staff
- Students: 1,216
- Teachers: 79.65 (FTE)
- Staff: 72.35 (FTE)
- Student–teacher ratio: 15.27

Other information
- Website: www.ntsd.org

Neshannock Township School District is a public school district located in Lawrence County, Pennsylvania. The district serves Neshannock Township, Pennsylvania, a community featuring a variety of suburban-style homes. The district features Neshannock Memorial Elementary School and Neshannock Jr/Sr High School. The current active superintendent of Neshannock Township School District is Dr. Terence P. Meehan, who became superintendent after Dr. Mary Todora and has been acting as superintendent since 2014.

This school district hosts the Neshannock Lancers, displaying the school colors of red and white.

== Student Activities ==
Despite its small size, the school district offers an assortment of sports and extracurricular activities and has its fair share of issues. Students become involved in athletics such as football, cheerleading, Lancerettes (dance line), soccer, tennis, golf, volleyball, basketball, track, cross country, Marching Band, Jazz Band, Concert Band, and baseball. Other various extracurricular activities are available as well such as National Honor Society, Student Council, Peer Leadership, Jr/Sr Class Play, National Art Honor Society, Spanish Club, French Club, Pep Club, Forensics and Linguistics, Musical, Choir, Band, Students of the Cross, Students Helping Students.

== Controversy ==
In 2018, a teacher named Russell Barley, was arrested for possession and possible distribution of child pornography. Dr Meehan stated "After speaking with the PA State Police we were informed that no Neshannock Township School District students were involved, nor was district equipment or resources used."

== Sports ==
The Lancers won the state title in baseball in 2004. They finished the season with a 23–1 record.

Neshannock's football program struggled in the late 80's to beginning of the new millennium. Recently, the program has turned around and frequents the post-season. Rival schools include Shenango, Mohawk, Laurel, and Union.
