= New Millport, Pennsylvania =

Unincorporated community in Pennsylvania, US

- Unincorporated community
- Location within Pennsylvania
- Coordinates: 40°53′37″N 78°32′19″W
- Country: United States
- State: Pennsylvania
- County: Clearfield
- Elevation: 1,342 ft (409 m)
- Time zone: UTC-5 (Eastern (EST))
  - Summer (DST): UTC-4 (EDT)
- ZIP code: 16861
- Area code: 814
- GNIS feature ID: 1182351

New Millport is an unincorporated community in Clearfield County, Pennsylvania, United States. The community is located 5.7 miles (9.2 km) south of Curwensville. New Millport has a post office, with ZIP code 16861.
