= New Castle Township, Pennsylvania =

Township in Pennsylvania, US

Coordinates: 40°45′06″N 76°15′29″W

- Township
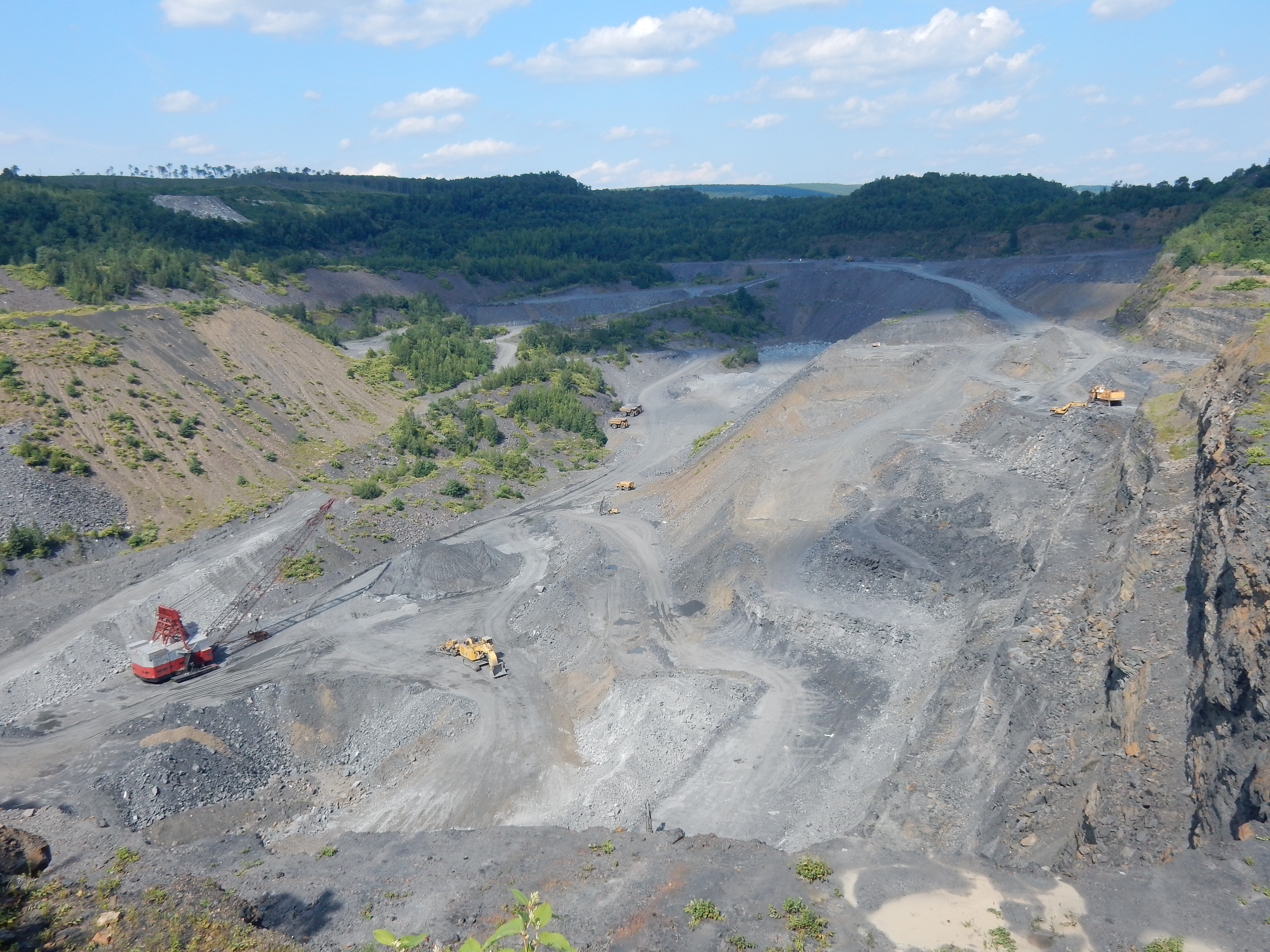
- Coal mining near village of Wadesville in New Castle Township.

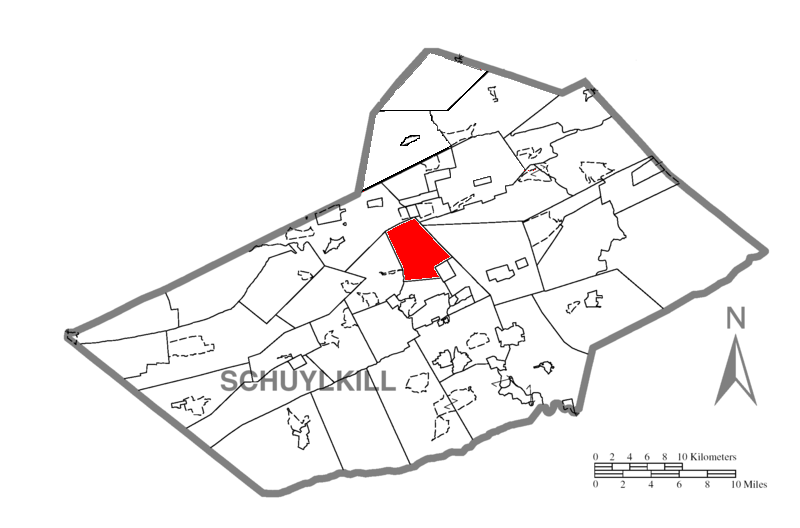
- Map of Schuylkill County, Pennsylvania Highlighting New Castle Township

- Map of Schuylkill County, Pennsylvania
- Country: United States
- State: Pennsylvania
- County: Schuylkill
- Settled: 1800
- Incorporated: 1847

Area
  - Total: 12.46 sq mi (32.27 km^{2})
  - Land: 12.26 sq mi (31.75 km^{2})
  - Water: 0.20 sq mi (0.52 km^{2})

Population (2020)
  - Total: 347 ▼
  - Estimate (2023): 348
  - Density: 31.9/sq mi (12.32/km^{2})
- Time zone: UTC-5 (Eastern (EST))
  - Summer (DST): UTC-4 (EDT)
- FIPS code: 42-107-53376

New Castle Township is a township that is located in Schuylkill County, Pennsylvania, United States, in the state's Coal Region. The population was 347 at the time of the 2020 census.

== History ==
Named for the famous coal city Newcastle upon Tyne in England, this area contains large veins of anthracite coal and has a long history of coal mining; strip mining continues there to the present day.

The area comprising New Castle Township was first settled by Europeans around 1800. The township was formed in 1847 from part of Norwegian Township.

== Geography ==
According to the United States Census Bureau, the township has a total area of 12.4 square miles (32.2 km^{2}), of which 12.2 square miles (31.6 km^{2}) is land and 0.2 square mile (0.5 km^{2}) (1.61%) is water.

== Demographics ==
Historical population
Census	Pop.	Note	%±
2010	414		—
2020	347		−16.2%
2023 (est.)	348		0.3%
U.S. Decennial Census

At the 2000 census there were 395 people, 180 households, and 113 families living in the township.

The population density was 32.3 inhabitants per square mile (12.5/km^{2}). There were 202 housing units at an average density of 16.5/sq mi (6.4/km^{2}).

The racial makeup of the township was 99.24% White, 0.25% African American and 0.51% Asian. Hispanic or Latino of any race were 0.25%.

Of the 180 households, 21.1% had children under the age of eighteen living with them; 41.7% were married couples living together, 12.8% had a female householder with no husband present, and 37.2% were non-families. 33.9% of households were one person and 20.0% were one person aged sixty-five or older.

The average household size was 2.19 and the average family size was 2.76.

The age distribution was 17.2% of residents who were under the age of eighteen, 5.1% who were aged eighteen to twenty-four, 26.3% who were aged twenty-five to forty-four, 25.6% who were aged forty-five to sixty-four, and 25.8% who were aged sixty-five or older. The median age was forty-six years.

For every one hundred females, there were 98.5 males. For every one hundred females who were aged eighteen or older, there were 98.2 males.

The median household income was $24,583 and the median family income was $32,917. Males had a median income of $29,167 compared with that of $23,125 for females.

The per capita income for the township was $14,716.

Approximately 5.5% of families and 6.0% of the population were living below the poverty line, including 3.5% of those who were under the age of eighteen and 5.9% of those who were aged sixty-five or older.

== Gallery ==
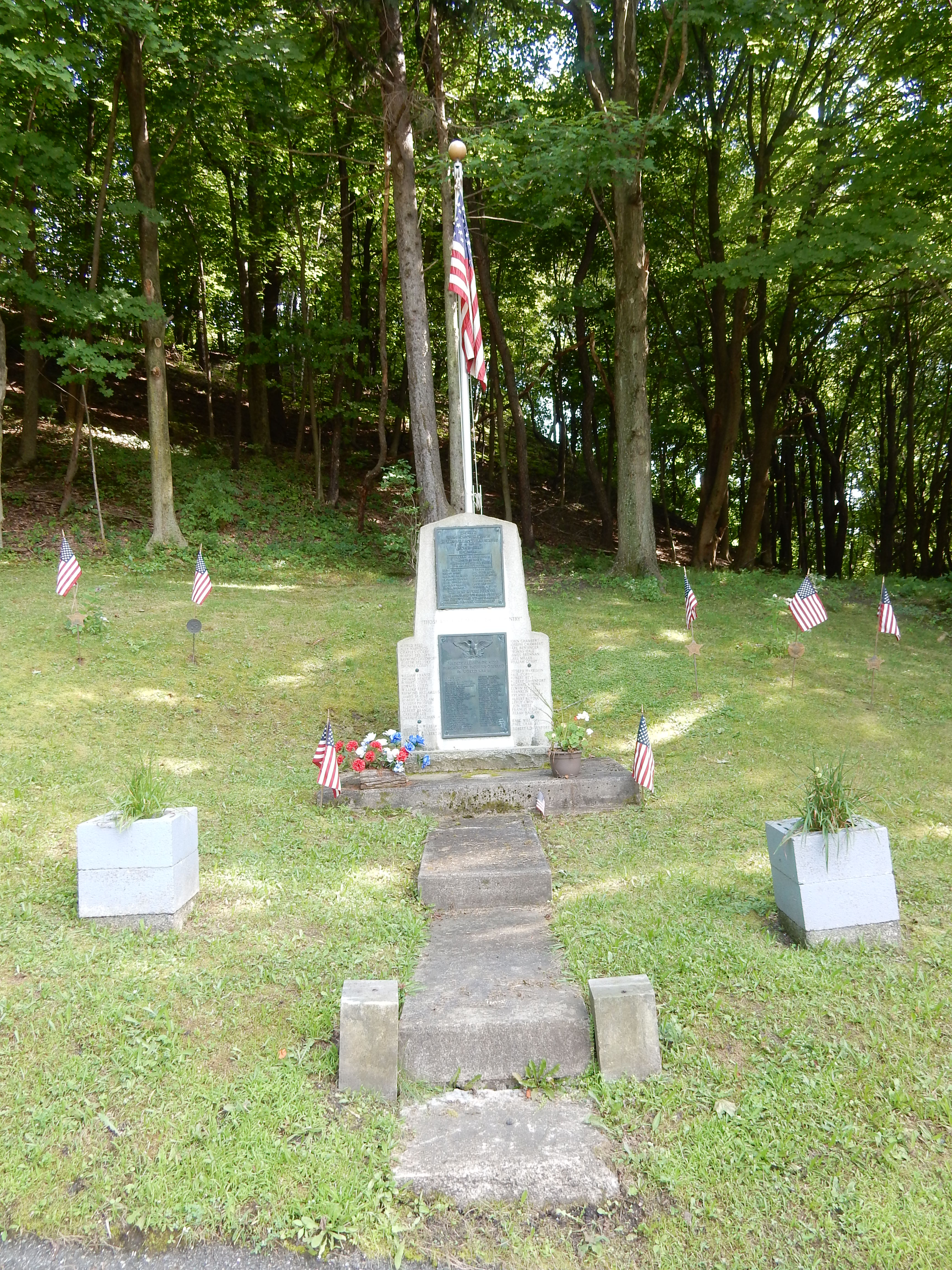
Wadesville War Memorial.

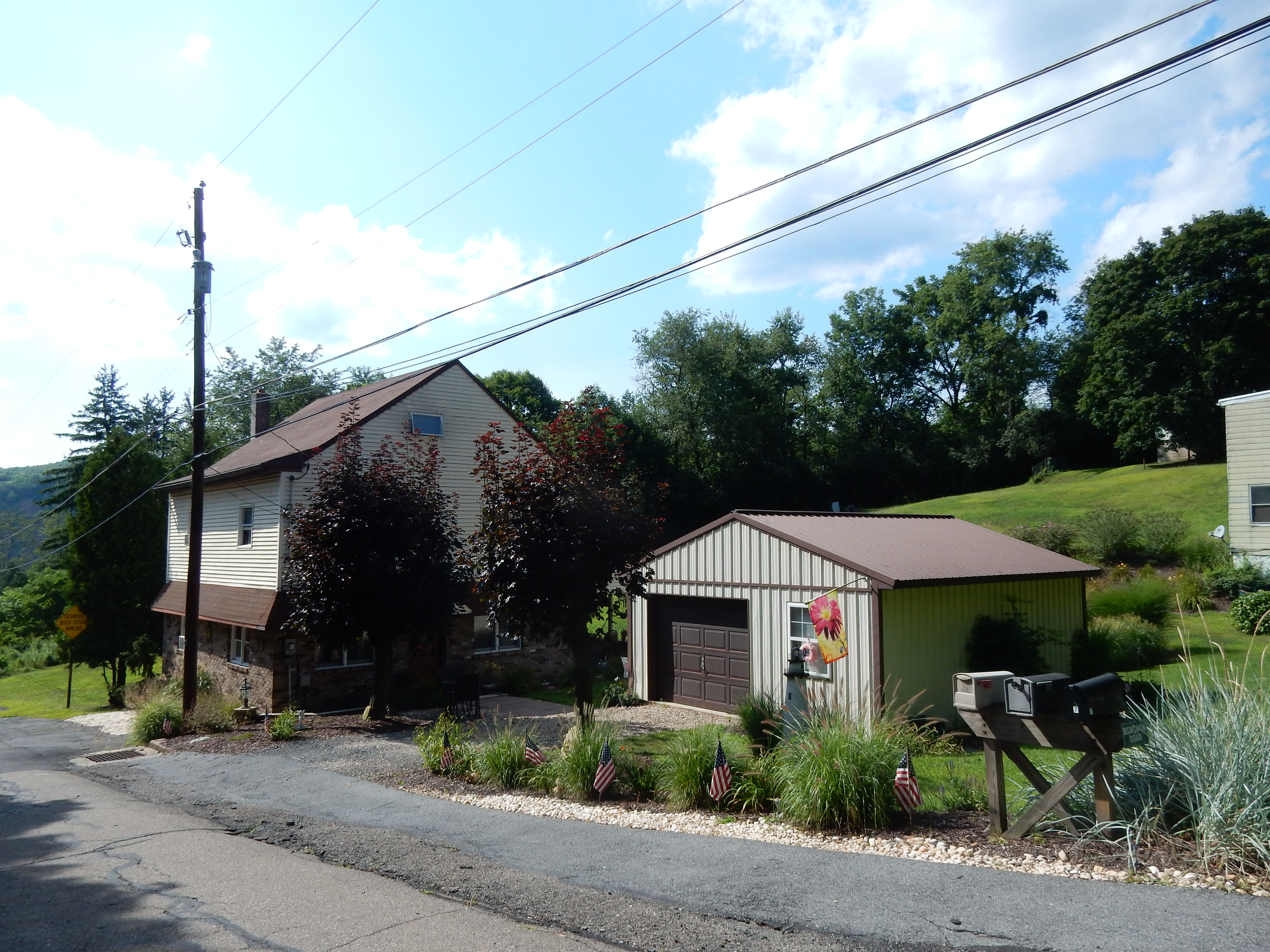
Village of Wadesville.

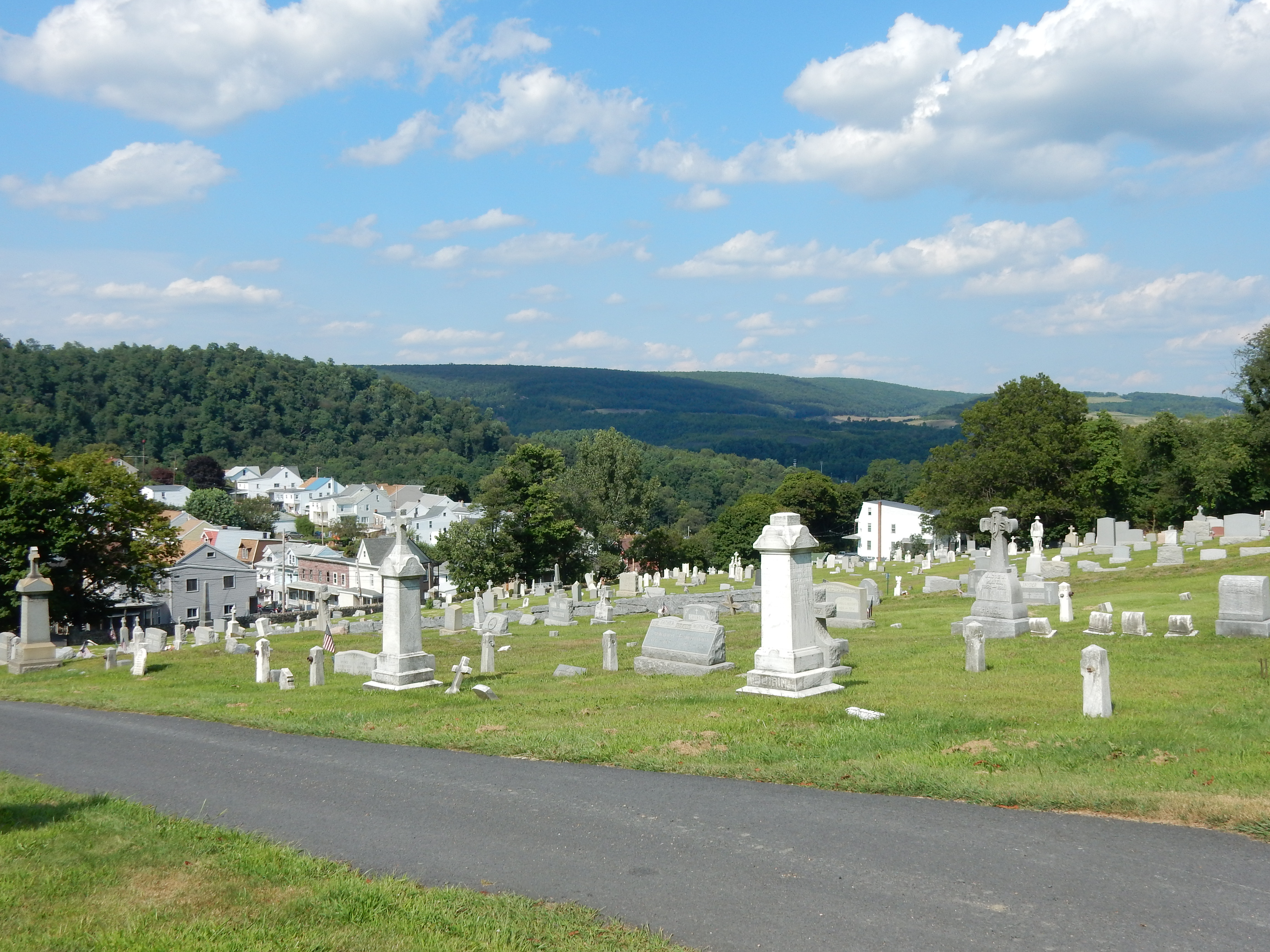
St. Boniface German Cemetery and Arnots Addition.
