= Newside, Pennsylvania =

Hamlet in Pennsylvania, U.S.

- Unincorporated community
- Location within Pennsylvania Location within the United States
- Coordinates: 40°41′26.34″N 75°38′39.68″W
- Country: United States
- State: Pennsylvania
- County: Lehigh
- Township: Heidelberg and Washington
- Elevation: 604 ft (184 m)
- Time zone: UTC-5 (Eastern (EST))
  - Summer (DST): UTC-4 (EDT)
- ZIP Code: 18065
- Area codes: 610 and 484
- GNIS feature ID: 1182214

Newside is a small hamlet in Lehigh County, Pennsylvania, located four miles west of the town of Neffs, at the corner of Park Avenue and Newside Road. It is part of the Lehigh Valley metropolitan area.

== Local roads ==
Park Avenue is a major thoroughfare for citizens of the nearby communities, as it connects PA Route 873 with the outlying towns along the Blue Mountain. It also provides a route to the Appalachian Trail at Bake Oven Knob.

Washington Street parallels Park Avenue and PA Route 309. It is a very important local alternate to the latter for accessing the locales to the north.

Newside Road runs perpendicular from Park Avenue to 309.

== Attractions ==
Heidelberg Heights, the main residential subdivision in Newside, is home to an annual yard sale in September that attracts people of all ages from miles around.

== Nearby communities ==
- Schnecksville
- Neffs
- Pleasant Corners
- New Tripoli
