= New Schaefferstown, Pennsylvania =

Unincorporated community in Pennsylvania, US

- Census-designated place
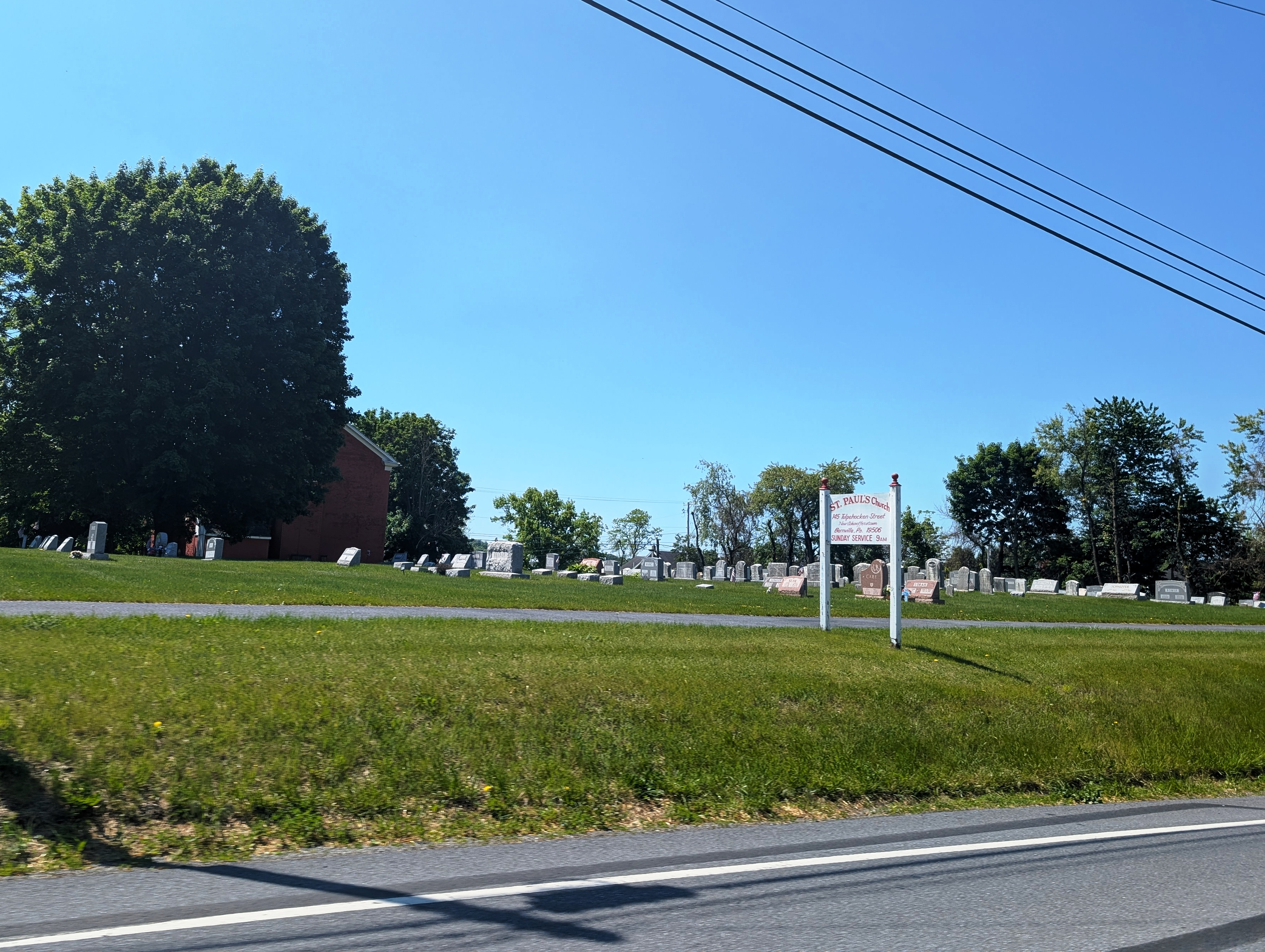
- St. Pauls Church and Cemetery

- Location within Pennsylvania Location within the United States
- Coordinates: 40°27′11″N 76°10′6″W
- Country: United States
- State: Pennsylvania
- County: Berks
- Township: Jefferson

Area
  - Total: 1.04 sq mi (2.69 km^{2})
  - Land: 1.04 sq mi (2.69 km^{2})
  - Water: 0 sq mi (0.00 km^{2})

Population (2020)
  - Total: 213
  - Density: 205.4/sq mi (79.31/km^{2})
- Time zone: UTC-5 (Eastern (EST))
  - Summer (DST): UTC-4 (EDT)
- FIPS code: 42-54064

New Schaefferstown is a census-designated place in Jefferson Township, Berks County, Pennsylvania. It is located five miles to the west of Bernville. As of the 2010 census, the population was 223 residents.

== Demographics ==
Historical population
Census	Pop.	Note	%±
2020	213		—
U.S. Decennial Census
