= Neshannock Township, Pennsylvania =

Township in Pennsylvania, US

Coordinates: 41°03′00″N 80°19′59″W

Neshannock Township
- Township
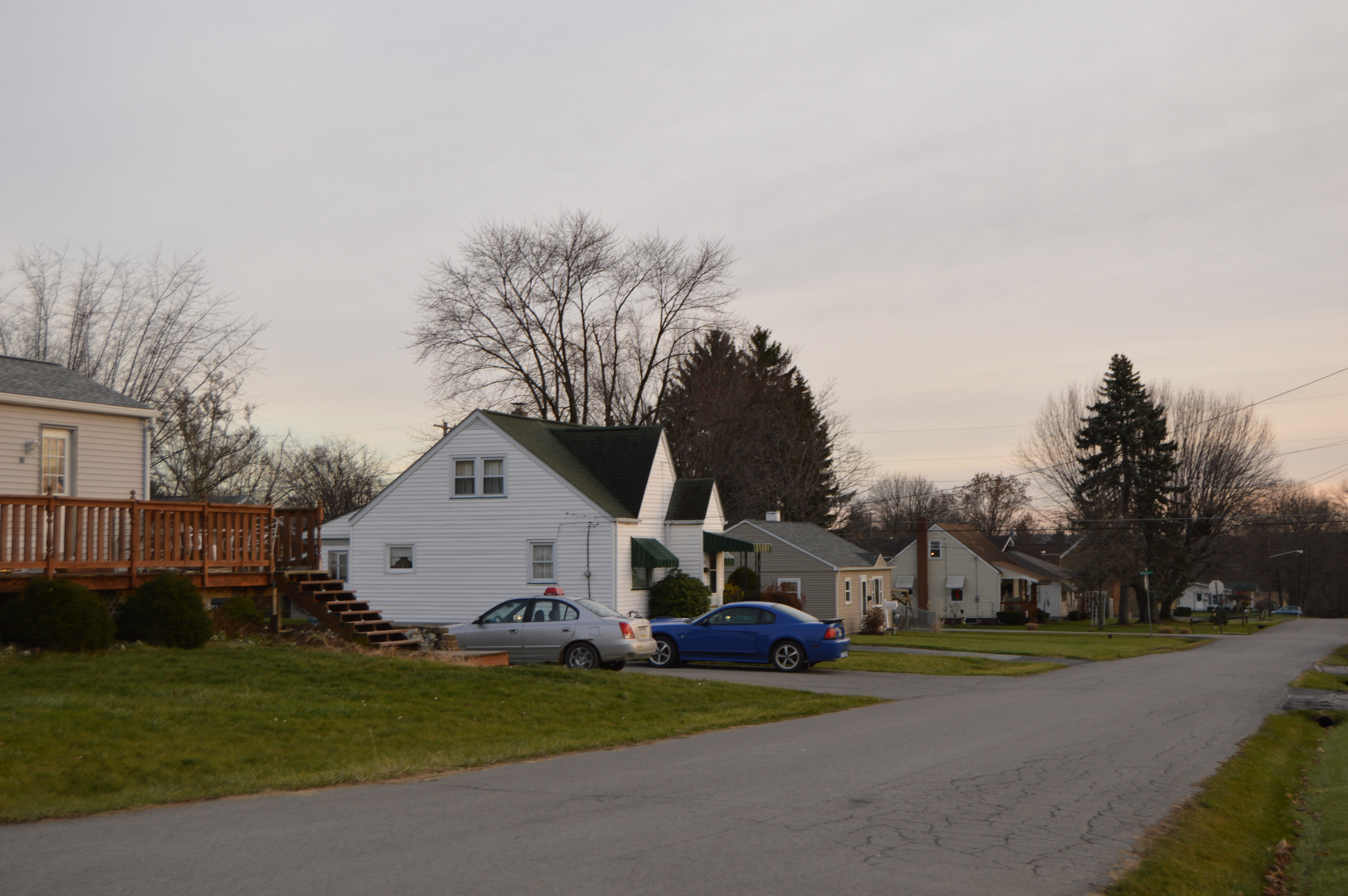
- Residential neighborhood in New Castle Northwest
- Etymology: Neshannock, Native American for "Land between two waters"
- Nickname: Lancers
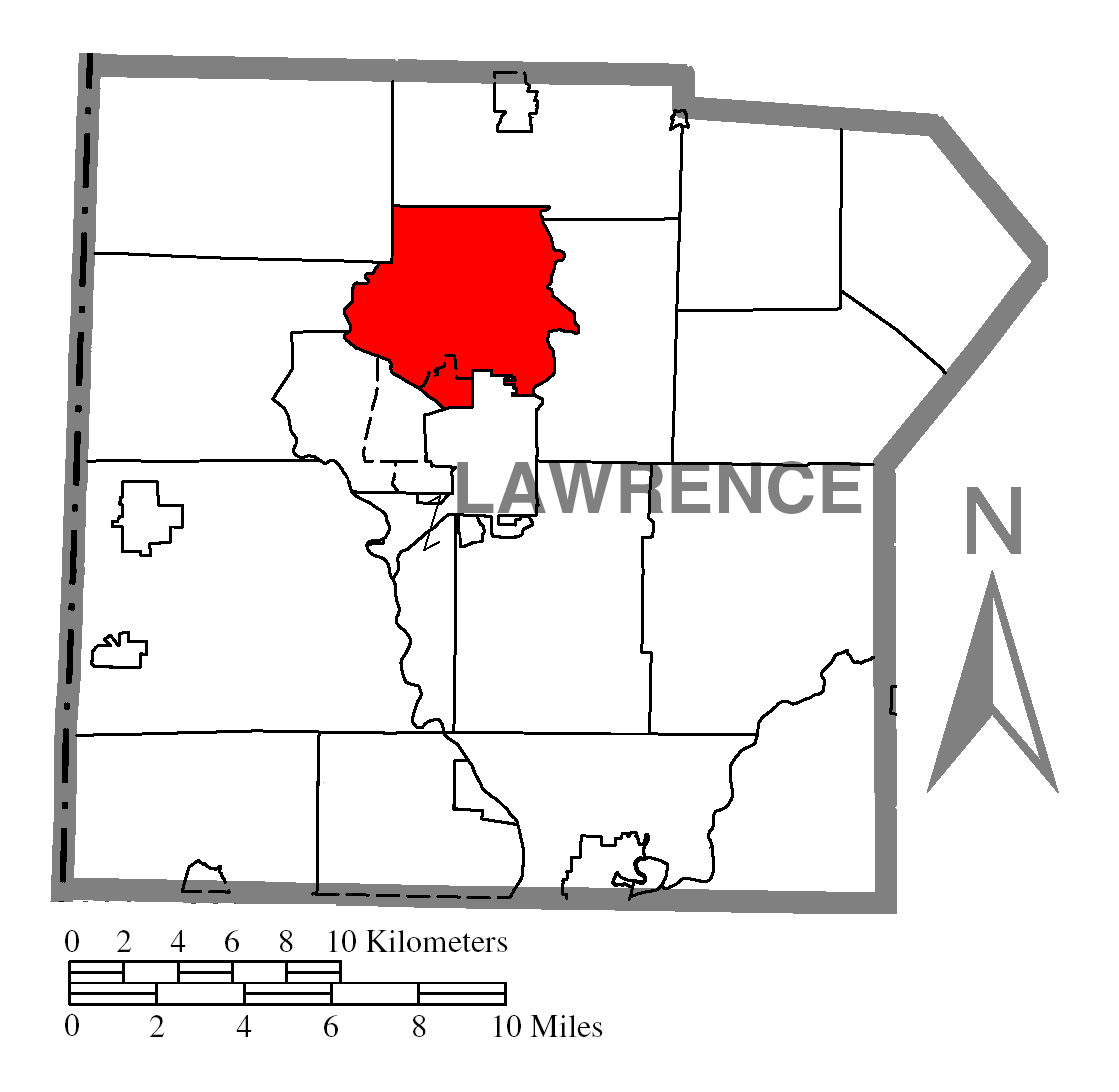
- Location of Neshannock Township in Lawrence County

- Location of Lawrence County in Pennsylvania
- Country: United States
- State: Pennsylvania
- County: Lawrence County
- Established: 1799

Area
  - Total: 17.42 sq mi (45.12 km^{2})
  - Land: 17.24 sq mi (44.64 km^{2})
  - Water: 0.19 sq mi (0.48 km^{2})
- Highest elevation (north of Fording Road): 1,250 ft (380 m)
- Lowest elevation (Shenango River): 795 ft (242 m)

Population (2020)
  - Total: 9,843
  - Density: 565.0/sq mi (218.15/km^{2})
- Time zone: UTC-4 (EST)
  - Summer (DST): UTC-5 (EDT)
- United States Postal Code: 16105
- Area code: 724
- FIPS code: 42-073-53064
- Website: www.neshannock.org

Historical population
Census	Pop.	Note	%±
2000	9,216		—
2010	9,609		4.3%
2020	9,843		2.4%
2022 (est.)	9,714		−1.3%
U.S. Decennial Census

Neshannock Township is a township in Lawrence County, Pennsylvania, United States. The population was 9,609 at the 2010 census.

The township derives its name from Neshannock Creek, a Native American name purported to mean "double stream". It was originally incorporated in 1803 as one of the original townships of Mercer County, and in 1849, joined the newly created Lawrence County.

== Geography ==
According to the United States Census Bureau, the township has a total area of 17.4 square miles (45.0 km^{2}), of which 17.3 square miles (44.9 km^{2}) is land and 0.1 square miles (0.2 km^{2}), or 0.34%, is water. The word Neshannock means "land between two waters".

The township includes the New Castle Northwest census-designated place, as well as the communities of Walmo, Coaltown, Painter Hill, Kings Chapel, and Sunset Valley.

== Demographics ==
As of the census of 2020, there were 9,843 people, 4,180 households residing in the township. The population density was 570.9 inhabitants per square mile (220.4/km^{2}). There were 3,978 housing units at an average density of 229.6 per square mile (88.6/km^{2}). The racial makeup of the township was 96.3% White, 1.6% African American, 0.11% Native American, 1.2% Asian, 0.01% Pacific Islander, 0.01% from other races, and 0.9% from two or more races. Hispanic or Latino of any race were 1.5% of the population.

There were 4,180 households, out of which 25.5% had children under the age of 18 living with them, 62.6% were married couples living together, 6.9% had a female householder with no husband present, and 28.5% were non-families. 27.0% of all households were made up of individuals, and 17.9% had someone living alone who was 65 years of age or older. The average household size was 2.36 and the average family size was 2.86.

In the township the population was spread out, with 16.1% under the age of 18, 4.8% from 18 to 24, 22.1% from 25 to 44, 26.7% from 45 to 64, and 27.5% who were 65 years of age or older. The median age was 47 years. For every 100 females there were 86.0 males. For every 100 females age 18 and over, there were 81.9 males.

The median income for a household in the township was $74,755, and the median income for a family was $54,036.The per capita income for the township was $46,852. About 1.7% of families and 3.8% of the population were below the poverty line, including 2.4% of those under age 18 and 7.1% of those age 65 or over.

Homes in Neshannock range from city street living on the edge of New Castle to larger country-style houses with several acres.

== Weather ==
Month	Av. High	Av. Low	Av. Precip.
January	35 F	16 F	2.29 Inches
February	39 F	17 F	2.08 Inches
March	50 F	25 F	2.94 Inches
April	61 F	34 F	3.28 Inches
May	72 F	45 F	3.48 Inches
June	80 F	54 F	4.30 Inches
July	85 F	59 F	4.19 Inches
August	83 F	57 F	3.56 Inches
September	76 F	50 F	3.74 Inches
October	65 F	38 F	2.60 Inches
November	52 F	31 F	3.16 Inches
December	40 F	23 F	2.81 Inches

=== Records ===
The highest recorded temperature was 102 °F in 1935. The lowest recorded temperature was -29 °F in 1930.

== Education ==
Neshannock Township's only school district is Neshannock Township School District. The school is one building divided into two parts by a set of doors. Neshannock Memorial School serves grades K-6, and Neshannock Junior/Senior High School serves 7th-12th graders.

== Transportation ==
=== Public transit ===
- New Castle Area Transit Authority

=== Major roads and highways ===
- I-376
- PA 18

== Recreation and sports ==
Neshannock Towhship's main recreation center is Pearson Park, which includes a members-only community pool, a playground, two Little League baseball fields, a party center (the Hutchison Center), a 1-mile walking trail, six tennis courts, a basketball court, and a volleyball court. Neshannock High School's tennis team's home court is at the park's tennis courts.

Also part of Neshannock Township's Pearson Park is Hess Ice Rink and Baseball Field. Hess Ice Rink is where ice hockey is played, figure skating is taught, and has public skating when the facility is open. Hess Ice Rink is the home ice of Hess Figure Skating Club. The rink is home of the Dallas Stars defenseman, Stephen Johns.

The New Castle Country Club is in Neshannock Township. The club has a golf course, tennis courts, putting green, and a driving range. They also have a restaurant and an area for parties.
