= Koziar's Christmas Village =

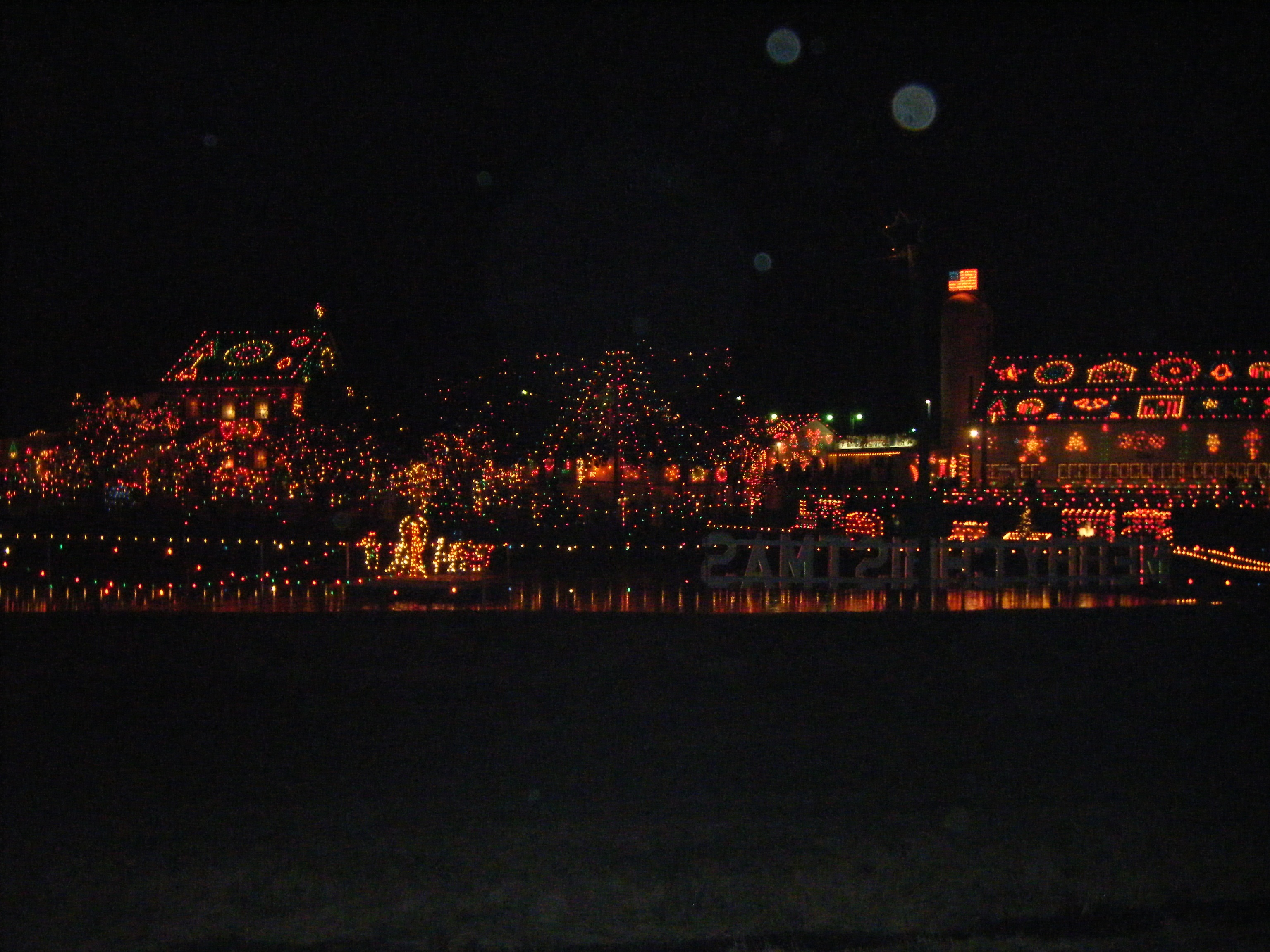
- Koziar's Christmas Village view from outside
- Interactive map of Koziar's Christmas Village
- Coordinates: 40.417463°N 76.141936°W
- Country: United States
- County: Berks County
- Website: Official website

Koziar's Christmas Village is a seasonal attraction located in Jefferson Township, near Bernville, Berks County, Pennsylvania, U.S., approximately 15 miles (24 km) northwest of Reading. Christmas Village utilizes approximately one half million Christmas lights and other decorative effects in a presentation that has repeatedly been listed among the top tourist attractions in Pennsylvania and the top Christmas displays in the United States.

The name Koziar rhymes with the English word composure.

== History ==
The Christmas Village was originally known as Spring Lake Dairy Farm. When William M. Koziar began decorating the farm for Christmas in 1948, the display was created for the enjoyment of Koziar's wife, Grace, and their four children. It originally centered on the house and barn. Soon after, the display became more elaborate and incorporated the lake, walkways, trees, and fences. Over time, the private display became a popular local attraction known as the ‘Christmas House.’ Traffic nearby would slow down because passersby would drive by slowly to get a chance to view the display.

Eventually, visitors were admitted to the premises, and Koziar soon turned the wheat field into a parking space. The dairy farm remained active at first. The Koziars had to wait until the cows were milked before the family could turn on the lights because there was not enough power for the milking machines and the lights to operate simultaneously.

Many of the dioramas were housed in old chicken coops, displaying toys and clothes of the Koziar children and grandchildren.

In 2008, Koziar's Christmas Village celebrated its 60th anniversary. It remains a family-owned attraction, currently operated by the Koziar daughters while several employees are second and third generation associates.

== Display ==
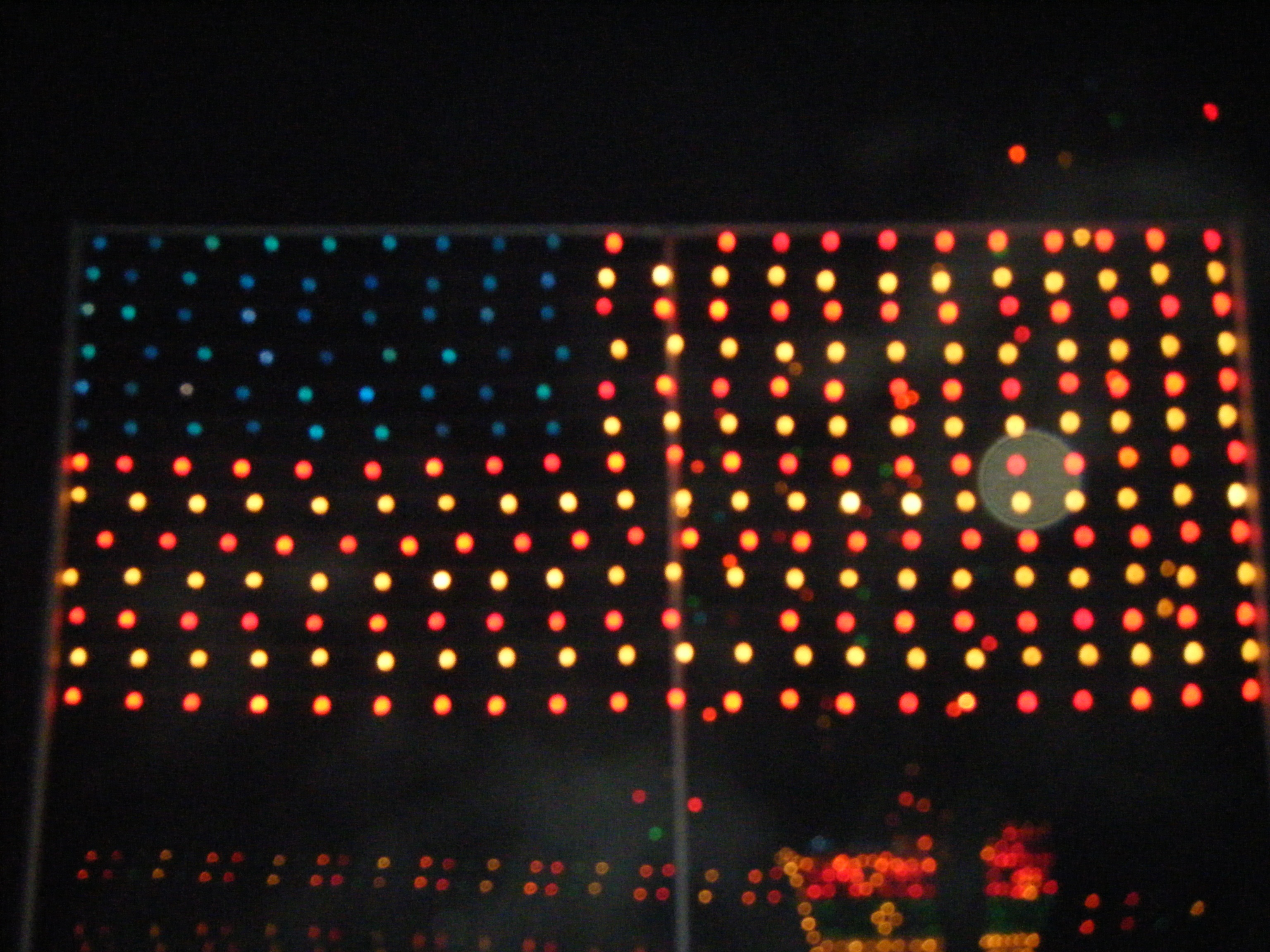
American flag light display

Christmas Village features the elaborately illuminated home and barn of the Koziar family, as well as numerous smaller buildings. Upon entrance, visitors are greeted by costumed characters Rudolph, Frosty, and the Village's own Buddy the Bear. A marked pathway leads visitors among the illuminated buildings and other displays. Children may visit Santa Claus at his headquarters on Santa Claus Lane. There are several large dioramas depicting scenes such as Christmas Beneath the Sea, Christmas in the Jungle, Santa's Post Office, and Christmas in Other Lands. There are a number of displays featuring cut-out representations of characters from popular comic strips, animated films and fairy tales, as well as manger scenes, presentations of the biblical story of the Nativity, and tellings of seasonal stories such as A Christmas Carol and The Nutcracker. The Village also includes a recreation of the Valley Forge encampment and a G gauge outdoor train layout that encompasses most of the barnyard. The "Kissing Bridge" has been the site of several marriage proposals, engagements and weddings. In addition, there are several indoor features, including an extensive H0 scale model train layout and sales area, as well as shops selling souvenirs, Christmas decorations, refreshments, and other seasonal items.

Perhaps the most dramatic feature of the Village is the first glimpse one sees of the display. Most visitors approach the property from the east, via Christmas Village Road. Being farm country the surrounding area is sparsely inhabited and, after dark, sparsely lit. The terrain blocks the view of the Village until the road crests a hill just a few hundred feet to the east of the display, at which point the entire Village is suddenly visible, reflected in the lake. As of late 2010 the Christmas Village website features a virtual recreation of this experience as a part of its home page.

== Operation ==
Koziar's Christmas Village is a seasonal attraction. It is typically in operation from the first Saturday of November through the first Sunday in January. During the off-season most elements of the display are dismantled and stored in order to protect them from the elements and to allow for repairs and modifications. Reviews by many visitors on the Trip Advisor website warn of heavy traffic and waiting times of up to four hours to enter the park on the busiest Saturday nights.

== Awards ==
Christmas Village has been named Best Outdoor Christmas Display in the World by Display World magazine. It has also been given the "Award of Excellence" by the Pennsylvania Travel Council as a top travel attraction in the state. A twilight image of Christmas Village was used as jacket art for the book Christmas in America: A Photographic Celebration of the Holiday Season by Peter Guttman. Christmas Village has been featured frequently by local media, as well as by national and international outlets such as Russia and Argentina.
