= Newkirk, Pennsylvania =

Unincorporated community in Pennsylvania, US

Newkirk
- Unincorporated community
- Location within the state of Pennsylvania Newkirk (the United States)
- Coordinates: 40°47′26″N 75°59′35″W
- Country: United States
- State: Pennsylvania
- County: Schuylkill
- Elevation: 935 ft (285 m)
- Time zone: UTC-5 (Eastern (EST))
  - Summer (DST): UTC-4 (EDT)
- GNIS feature ID: 1204285

Newkirk is an unincorporated community and coal town in Schuylkill County, Pennsylvania, United States, 1.4 miles south of Tamaqua.
