= New Castle Northwest, Pennsylvania =

Unincorporated community in Pennsylvania, US

New Castle Northwest
- Census-designated place
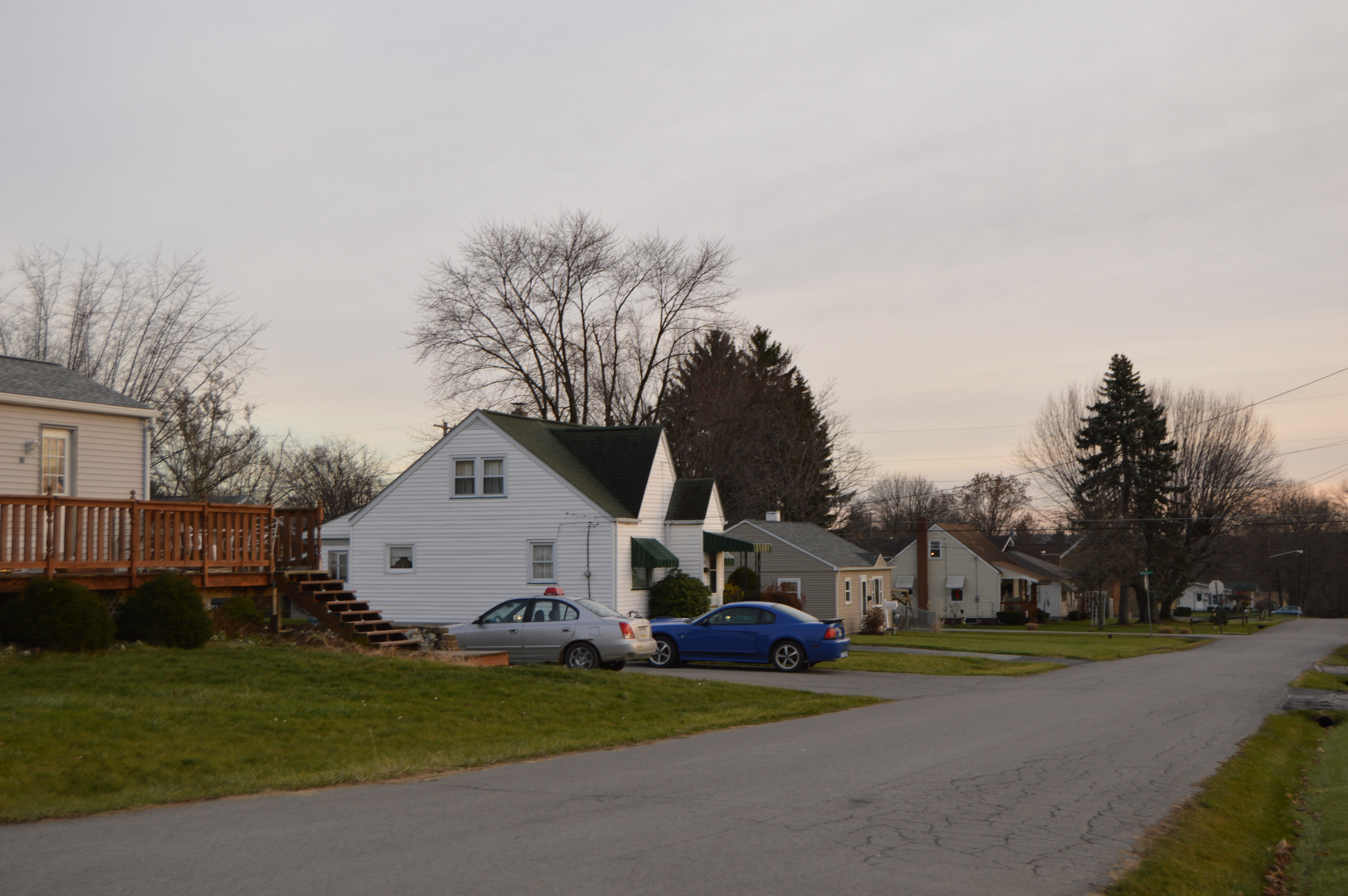
- Houses on Beaver Street

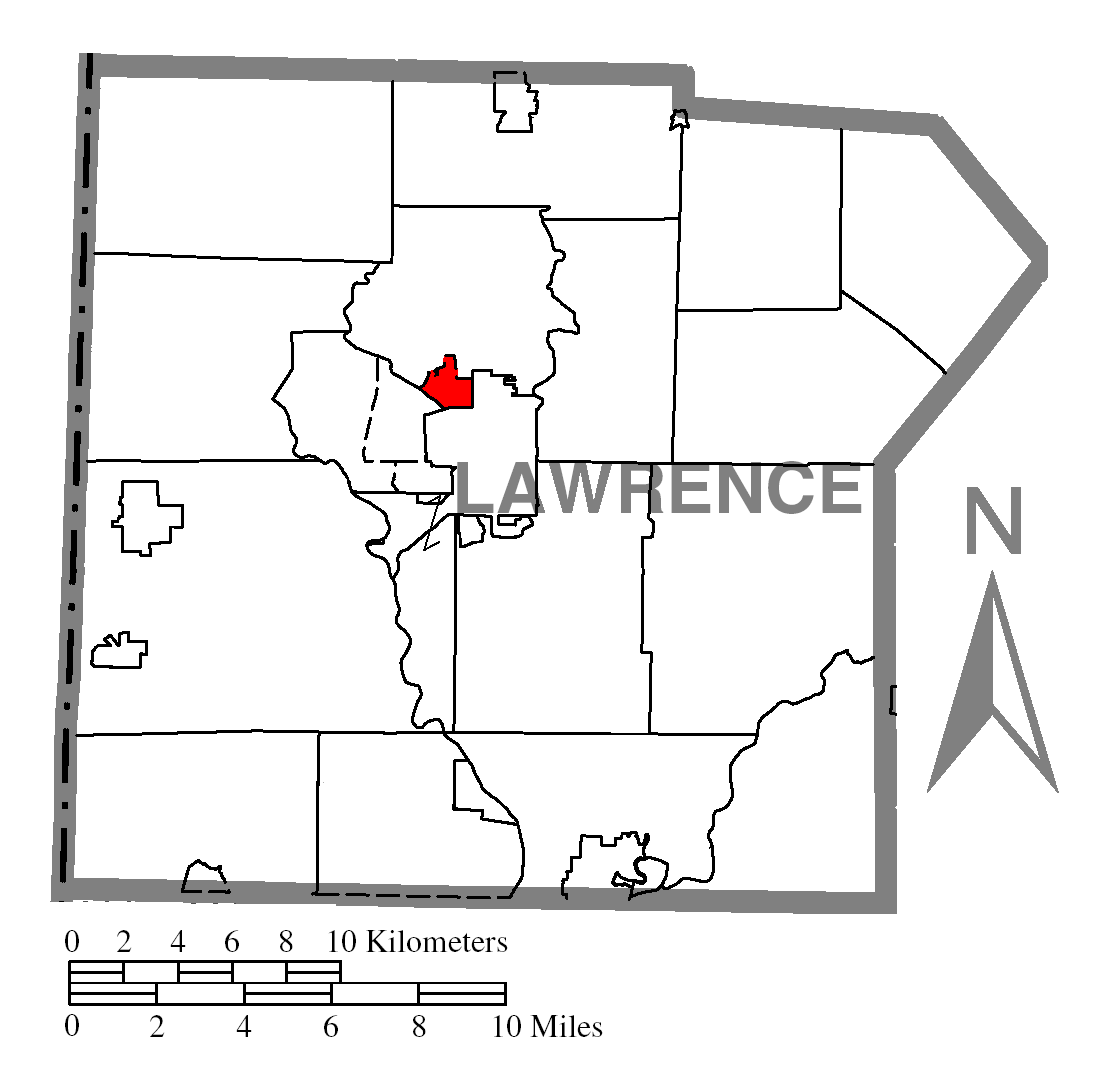
- Location in Lawrence County

- Location in Pennsylvania Location in the United States
- Coordinates: 41°1′17″N 80°21′11″W
- Country: United States
- State: Pennsylvania
- County: Lawrence County
- Township: Neshannock

Area
  - Total: 0.87 sq mi (2.26 km^{2})
  - Land: 0.87 sq mi (2.25 km^{2})
  - Water: 0.0039 sq mi (0.01 km^{2})
- Elevation: 1,047 ft (319 m)

Population (2020)
  - Total: 1,397
  - Density: 1,605.8/sq mi (620.01/km^{2})
- Time zone: UTC-4 (EST)
  - Summer (DST): UTC-5 (EDT)
- ZIP code: 16105
- Area code: 724
- FIPS code: 42-53392
- GNIS feature ID: 2389539

New Castle Northwest is an unincorporated area and census-designated place (CDP) in Lawrence County, Pennsylvania, United States. The population was 1,413 at the 2010 census.

== Geography ==
New Castle Northwest is located in central Lawrence County at 41°1′17″N 80°21′11″W (41.021338, -80.352919), on the northwestern side of the city of New Castle, the county seat. The CDP is in the southern part of Neshannock Township and is bordered to the southwest by Union Township. The southwestern border follows the Shenango River, a southward-flowing tributary of the Beaver River, part of the Ohio River watershed.

Pennsylvania Route 18 (Wilmington Road) runs through the CDP, leading south into New Castle and north 18 miles (29 km) to Hermitage.

According to the United States Census Bureau, the CDP has a total area of 0.89 square miles (2.3 km^{2}), of which 1.7 acres (6,884 m^{2}), or 0.30%, are water.

== Demographics ==
Historical population
Census	Pop.	Note	%±
2020	1,397		—
U.S. Decennial Census

As of the census of 2000, there were 1,535 people, 694 households, and 435 families residing in the CDP. The population density was 1,791.8 inhabitants per square mile (691.8/km^{2}). There were 731 housing units at an average density of 853.3 per square mile (329.5/km^{2}). The racial makeup of the CDP was 97.98% White, 0.33% African American, 0.07% Native American, 1.17% Asian, 0.07% from other races, and 0.39% from two or more races. Hispanic or Latino of any race were 0.46% of the population.

There were 694 households, out of which 20.5% had children under the age of 18 living with them, 51.3% were married couples living together, 8.9% had a female householder with no husband present, and 37.2% were non-families. 35.9% of all households were made up of individuals, and 25.9% had someone living alone who was 65 years of age or older. The average household size was 2.14 and the average family size was 2.78.

In the CDP the population was spread out, with 17.2% under the age of 18, 3.6% from 18 to 24, 21.3% from 25 to 44, 23.5% from 45 to 64, and 34.4% who were 65 years of age or older. The median age was 50 years. For every 100 females there were 78.9 males. For every 100 females age 18 and over, there were 75.3 males.

The median income for a household in the CDP was $28,500, and the median income for a family was $38,775. Males had a median income of $24,531 versus $35,694 for females. The per capita income for the CDP was $21,085. About 2.8% of families and 6.0% of the population were below the poverty line, including none of those under age 18 and 10.4% of those age 65 or over.
