= Neola, Pennsylvania =

Unincorporated community in Pennsylvania, United States

Coordinates: 40°57′32″N 75°20′25″W

The village of Neola is an unincorporated community spanning the Jackson and Hamilton townships at the foothills of the Pocono Mountains in Monroe County, Pennsylvania. The elevation is 807 feet (246 m)
