= Newtonburg, Pennsylvania =

Unincorporated community in Pennsylvania, US

- Unincorporated community
- Location within Pennsylvania Location within the United States
- Coordinates: 40°55′07″N 78°45′38″W
- Country: United States
- State: Pennsylvania
- County: Clearfield
- Elevation: 1,837 ft (560 m)
- Time zone: UTC-5 (Eastern (EST))
  - Summer (DST): UTC-4 (EDT)
- Area code: 814
- GNIS feature ID: 1182419

Newtonburg is an unincorporated community in Clearfield County, Pennsylvania, United States.
