= Stone Soup (disambiguation) =

Stone Soup is a folk story that teaches the value of sharing.

Stone Soup may also refer to:

== Art, entertainment, and media ==
=== Literature ===
- Stone Soup: An Old Tale (1947), children's book by Marcia Brown
- Stone Soup (1968), book by Ann McGovern
- Stone Soup (2003), children's book by Jon J. Muth set in China

=== Other media ===
- Stone Soup (comic strip), U.S. comic strip
- Stone Soupercomputer, a compute cluster
- Dungeon Crawl Stone Soup, computer game
- Stone Soup (magazine), California, US

== Brands, enterprises, and organizations ==
- Stone Soup (beer)
- Stone Soup Coffeehouse, a folk music venue, Pawtucket, Rhode Island, US
- Stone Soup Cooperative, a housing cooperative
- Stonesoup School, located in Crescent City, Florida, US
