= The Story of =

The Story of may refer to:

- The Story of Demis Roussos, a 1987 album by Demis Roussos
- The Story of (book series), a collection of picture books written by Ying Chang Compestine and illustrated by Yongsheng Xuan
- The Story of ..., a 1962-63 American weekly TV documentary series, hosted by John Willis, profiling various professions, including writer Ray Bradbury
