= Atwater-Donnelly =

American folk music group

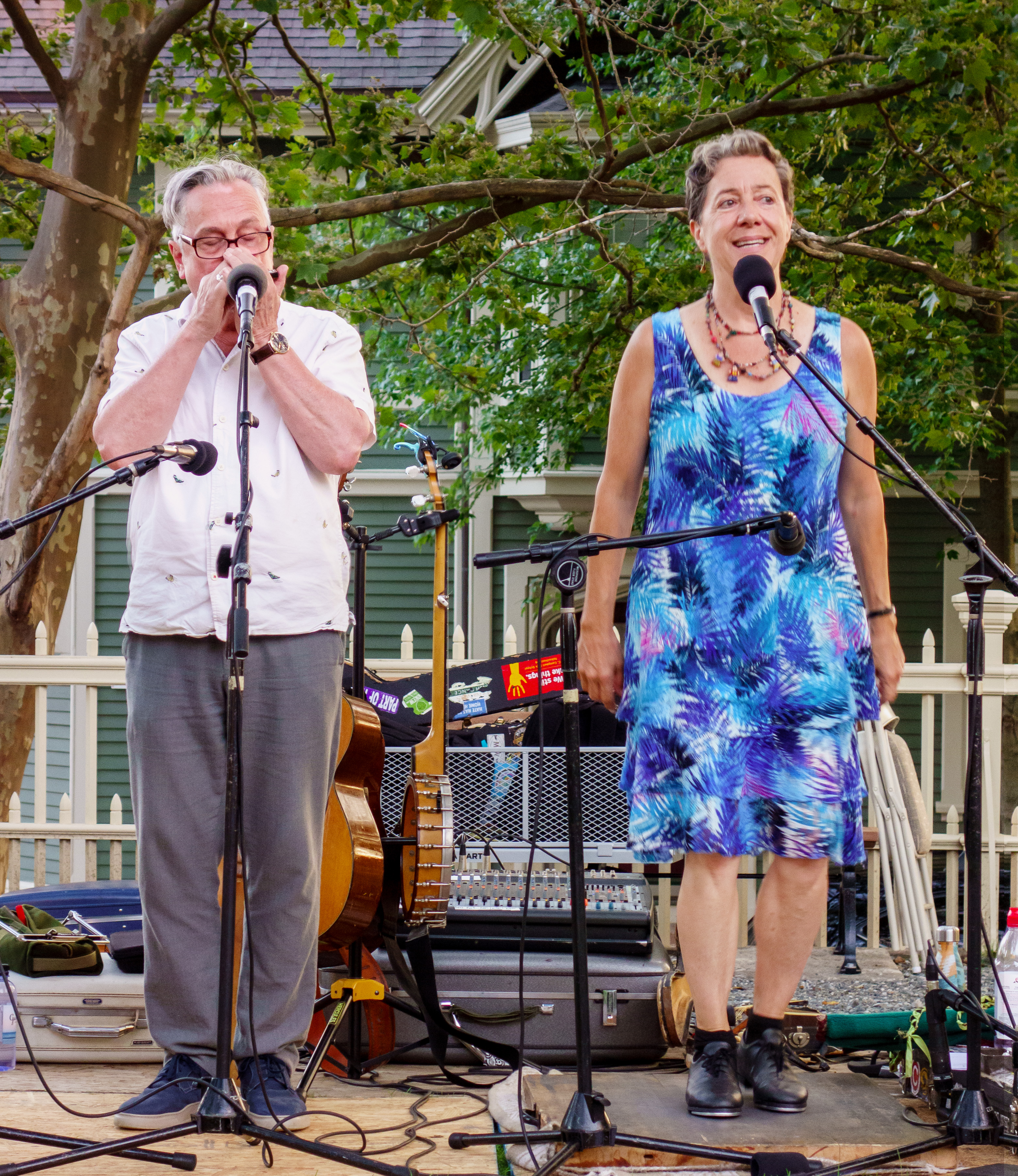
Elwood Donnelly (left) and Aubrey Atwater (right)

Atwater-Donnelly is an American folk music group from Rhode Island consisting of Aubrey Atwater, Elwood Donnelly, and occasionally other musicians and dancers. They have toured throughout the United States and internationally, playing guitar, banjo, Appalachian dulcimer, tin whistle, limberjack, and other instruments. In recent years, they have also performed as The Atwater-Donnelly Trio, with Cathy Clasper-Torch.

Atwater and Donnelly met as volunteers at the Stone Soup Coffeehouse in Rhode Island in early 1987, and started playing together a few months later. They specialize in traditional American folk music and Celtic folk music, but write and play their own songs as well. Their performances have been featured on All Songs Considered and Fiona Ritchie's The Thistle & Shamrock on public radio. Atwater regularly runs workshops at places like the John C. Campbell Folk School, as well as performing and teaching clogging and flat-footing dance, derived mainly from dance steps learned in Appalachia and the southeast U.S.

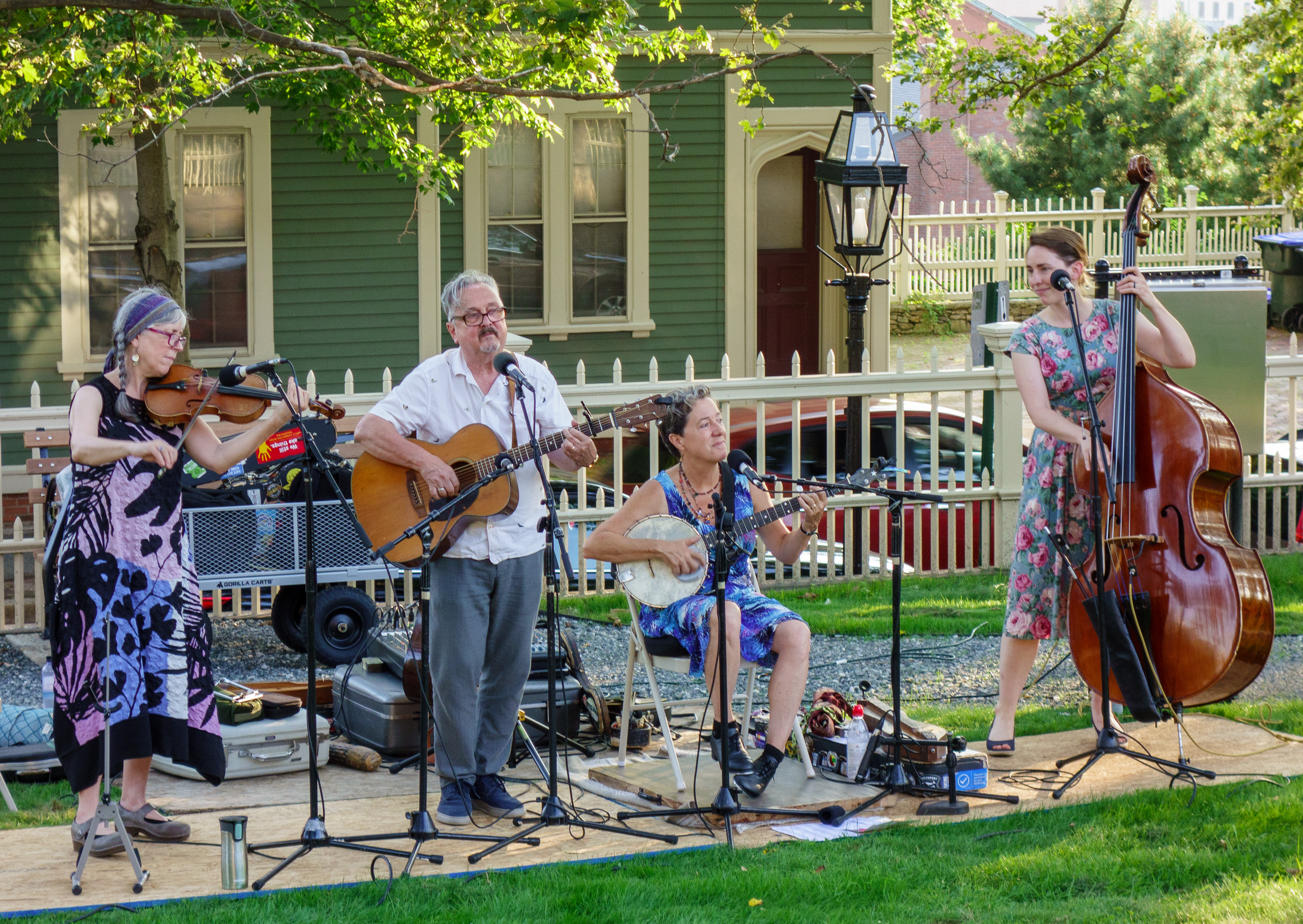
Atwater-Donnelly with Cathy Clasper-Torch and Erin Lobb Mason.

They were one of the earlier musical groups to be on the web, after one of their fans worked with Atwater to put a site up in 1995.

They have released 14 albums, several books of poetry, and three songbooks.

Atwater was selected to serve as Artist-in-residence at the Grand Canyon National Park in May–June 2011.

== Albums ==
=== Atwater-Donnelly ===
- Labor and Love (1988)
- Culled from the Garden (1991)
- Like the Willow Tree (1994)
- Where the Wild Birds Do Whistle (1997)
- And Then I'm Going Home: Atwater-Donnelly Live (2001)
- The Blackest Crow (2004)
- When Winter Calls (2005)
- The Halfway Ground (2007) (with Cathy Clasper-Torch, Heidi Cerrigione, John Cerrigione, Uriah Donnelly, and Kevin Doyle)
- The Weaver's Bonny (2009) (with Cathy Clasper-Torch, John and Heidi Cerrigione, Uriah Donnelly, and Kevin Doyle)
- Each Other's Story (2011) (with Cathy Clasper-Torch, John and Heidi Cerrigione, Kevin Doyle, Paul Dube, Morgan Santos, and Alex Krepkikh)
- The World Is Old Tonight (2016) (with Cathy Clasper-Torch, John Cerrigione, Uriah Donnelly, Kevin Doyle, and Torrin Ryan)
- The Boat You Row (2022) (with Cathy Clasper-Torch, Erin Lobb Mason, and Torrin Ryan)

=== Atwater solo ===
- Simple Sentences (1992)
- Daily Growing: Aubrey Atwater Live in the Classroom (1999)

=== DVD ===
- Going Up Home: The Passion of Atwater-Donnelly (2007)
  - This documentary was written and directed by Aubrey and Elwood's youngest son, Uriah. It explores their biographies and shows their effect on others.

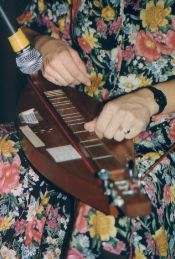
Aubrey playing Appalachian dulcimer
