= National Coalition of Alternative Community Schools =

International organization based in the U.S. city of Ann Arbor, Michigan

The National Coalition of Alternative Community Schools, or NCACS, was an international organization based in the U.S. city of Ann Arbor, Michigan, dedicated to promoting alternative education. The organization was founded in 1978. It is known for its annual conferences, which bring together the community of community schools and homeschoolers and are held in a different location around the country each year. It also holds regional conferences. The NCACS also produces a directory of alternative community schools which it sells, as well as a quarterly newsletter. In April 2014, the program closed.

== Alternative Community Schools ==
The NCACS defines its membership as consisting of:

- Home educating parents and students
- Independent (private) alternative schools and programs
- Government (public) alternative schools and programs
- Alternative colleges and universities
- Experiential and adventure-oriented programs
- Learning centers and traveling schools
- Individuals and lifelong learners
- Cultural centers and intentional communities
- Publishers and researchers focused on alternative education topics

== Annual conferences ==
- 2006 - held on The Farm, Tennessee
- 2005 - held in Chicago, Illinois
- 2004 - held on The Farm, Tennessee
- 1995 - held in Colorado
- 1994 - held in Blacksburg, Virginia
- 1993 - held near Jasper, Arkansas on the Buffalo National River
- 1992 - held in Indiana
- 1986 - held at Upatinas in Glenmoore, Pennsylvania

== Member schools ==
A partial listing of NCACS member schools:

- Clonlara School
- Stonesoup School
- Cobblestone School
- The Forum
- Upattinas School and Resource Center
- Upland Hills School

== See also ==
- Growing Without Schooling
- Homeschooling
- Grace Llewellyn
