= The Runaway Wok =

2011 children's picture book

The Runaway Wok: A Chinese New Year Tale
- Author: Ying Chang Compestine
- Illustrator: Sebastia Serra
- Language: English
- Genre: Children's books
- Publisher: Dutton Children's Books
- Publication date: January 6, 2011
- Publication place: United States
- ISBN: 0525420681

The Runaway Wok is a children's picture book written by Ying Chang Compestine and illustrated by Sebastia Serra. Published in 2011 by Dutton Children's Books, the story follows a boy named Ming and his adventures with a magical talking wok who grants wishes. The story portrays the rich family as evil and the poor family as heroic.

== Plot summary ==
In preparation for the Chinese New Year, the poor Zhang family sends Ming to the market to trade eggs for rice. At the market, an old man persuades Ming to trade the eggs for a magical talking wok. When Ming's mother goes to reprimand him, the wok asks her to polish it. When she finishes cleaning the wok, it jumps away and rolls down the road. It returns three times with food, toys, and money taken from the greedy Mr. Li, taking from the rich and giving to the poor of the village. At the end of the story the family shares the gifts of the wok with the community. The story is based on a Danish folktale called The Talking Pot, and also alludes to The Gingerbread Man.

The book concludes with an author's note and a recipe for "Festive Stir-Fried Rice" and also includes information about the symbolism of the wok and Chinese New Year's foods.

== Characters ==
- Ming - Protagonist, poor, young boy
- Mama Zhang - Ming's mother
- Poppa Zhang - Ming's father
- Old Man - Previous owner of the wok
- Wok - Magical wok
- Mr. Li - Antagonist, Richest man in Beijing
- Mrs. Li - Mr. Li's wife
- Lan Li - Son of Mr. and Mrs. Li

== Critical reception ==
Library Media Connection wrote "The author and the illustrator have created a picture book that provides not only an excellent introduction to the Chinese New Year holiday, but a lesson on sharing." School Library Journal called the illustrations vibrant, and that they "bring a stylized Beijing of once-upon-a-time to life." Booklist praised the illustrations, which were painted by Sebastia Serra, and wrote that the "well-paced repetitive text reads aloud well." Since the story is based on a folk tale about a talking pot, Kirkus Reviews, felt that using a wok instead was very appropriate, especially since a wok is "a traditional symbol of sharing." It has also been reviewed by Horn Book Guide.

== Awards ==
- 2013-14 Iowa Goldfinch Award Nominee
- 2013 Washington Children's Choice Picture Book Award Nominee
- 2012 Storytelling World Resource Award
- 2011 Lasting Connections Top 30 Titles from Booklist
