= Cooking with an Asian Accent =

2014 cookbook by Ying Chang Compestine

- Author: Ying Chang Compestine
- Language: English
- Genre: Cookbook
- Publisher: Houghton Mifflin Harcourt
- Publication date: January 14, 2014
- Publication place: United States
- ISBN: 1118130758

Cooking with an Asian Accent is a cookbook written by author Ying Chang Compestine. Unlike traditional cookbooks, Compestine's recipes are inspired by the efficiency of Western culture and the spiritual nourishment of Asian lifestyle. Among the recipes, Compestine includes personal stories of her experience with the blending of Eastern and Western culture.

== Critical reception ==
Cooking with an Asian Accent has been featured on several news outlets, including The Mercury News, NPR's Morning Edition, Epicurious, and The Boston Globe. The cookbook has also been highlighted in interviews on Wisconsin Public Radio and Connecticut Public Radio.
