= Wallace Township, Pennsylvania =

Township in Pennsylvania, US

Wallace Township
- Township
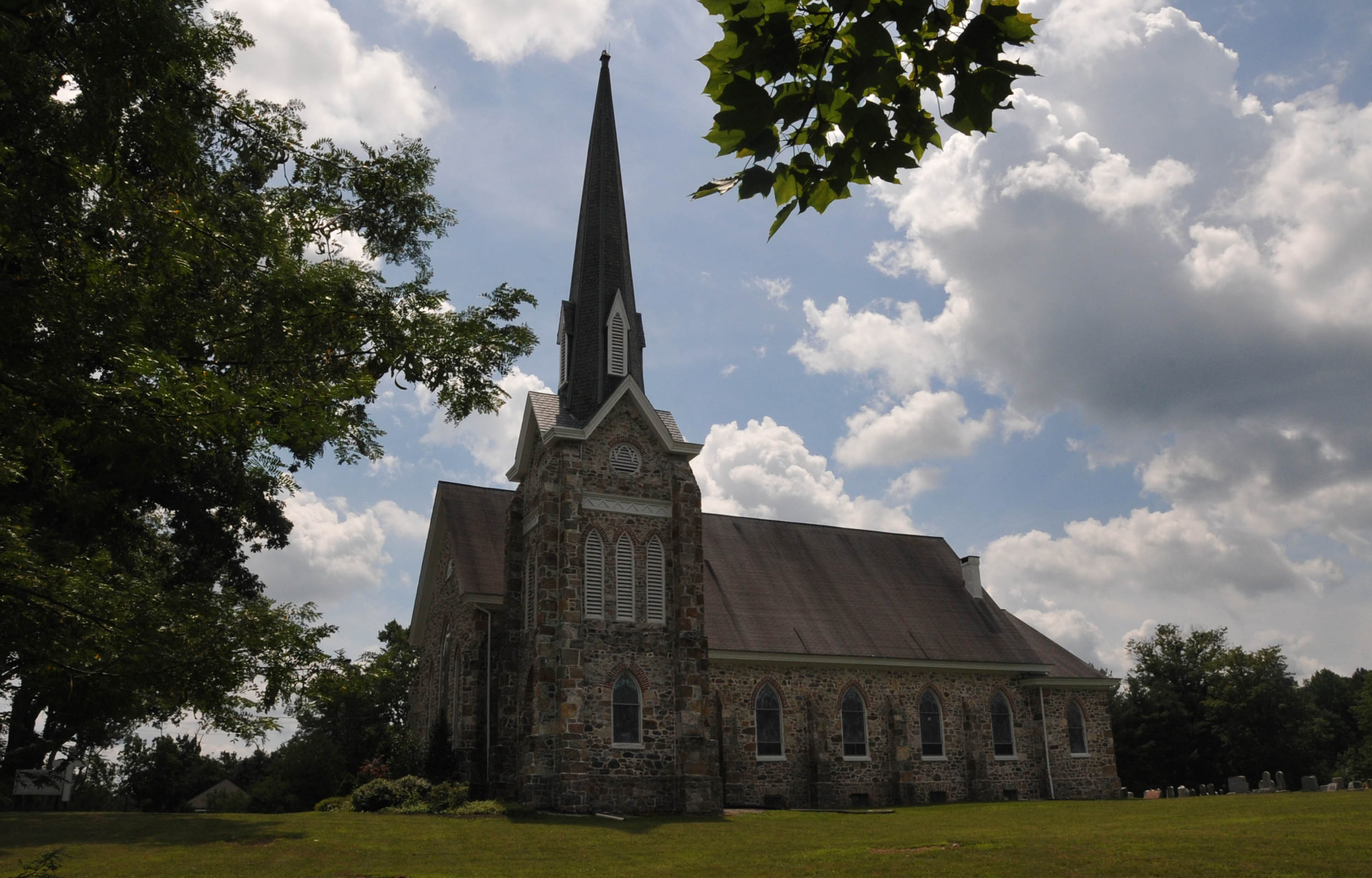
- A church in Glenmoore

- Location of Wallace Township in Chester County and in Pennsylvania

- Location of Pennsylvania in the United States
- Coordinates: 40°05′26″N 75°46′15″W
- Country: United States
- State: Pennsylvania
- County: Chester

Area
  - Total: 12.13 sq mi (31.41 km^{2})
  - Land: 11.96 sq mi (30.98 km^{2})
  - Water: 0.17 sq mi (0.43 km^{2})
- Elevation: 440 ft (130 m)

Population (2010)
  - Total: 3,458
  - Estimate (2016): 3,677
  - Density: 307/sq mi (118.7/km^{2})
- Time zone: UTC-5 (EST)
  - Summer (DST): UTC-4 (EDT)
- Area code: 610
- FIPS code: 42-029-80616
- Website: www.wallacetwp.org

Wallace Township is a township in Chester County, Pennsylvania, United States. The population was 3,458 at the 2010 census.

== History ==
The Glenmoore Historic District, William Ferguson Farm, and Springton Manor Farm are listed on the National Register of Historic Places.

== Geography ==
According to the U.S. Census Bureau, the township has a total area of 12.1 square miles (31 km^{2}), of which 12.0 square miles (31 km^{2}) is land and 0.1 square miles (0.26 km^{2}), or 0.41%, is water. It contains the census-designated place of Glenmoore.

== Demographics ==
Historical population
Census	Pop.	Note	%±
1930	630		—
1940	597		−5.2%
1950	771		29.1%
1960	1,065		38.1%
1970	1,347		26.5%
1980	1,881		39.6%
1990	2,541		35.1%
2000	3,240		27.5%
2010	3,458		6.7%
2020	3,711		7.3%

At the 2010 census, the township was 92.7% non-Hispanic White, 3.2% Black or African American, 0.1% Native American, 1.4% Asian, and 1.1% were two or more races. 1.6% of the population were of Hispanic or Latino ancestry.

At the 2000 census there were 3,240 people, 1,009 households, and 855 families living in the township. The population density was 269.3 inhabitants per square mile (104.0/km^{2}). There were 1,045 housing units at an average density of 86.9 per square mile (33.6/km^{2}). The racial makeup of the township was 95.68% White, 2.50% African American, 0.03% Native American, 1.17% Asian, 0.06% Pacific Islander, 0.34% from other races, and 0.22% from two or more races. Hispanic or Latino of any race were 1.30%.

There were 1,009 households, 46.6% had children under the age of 18 living with them, 77.5% were married couples living together, 4.7% had a female householder with no husband present, and 15.2% were non-families. 12.0% of households were made up of individuals, and 4.3% were one person aged 65 or older. The average household size was 3.07 and the average family size was 3.36.

The age distribution was 33.7% under the age of 18, 4.6% from 18 to 24, 28.3% from 25 to 44, 25.9% from 45 to 64, and 7.5% 65 or older. The median age was 37 years. For every 100 females there were 106.0 males. For every 100 females age 18 and over, there were 95.6 males.

The median household income was $86,881 and the median family income was $95,104. Males had a median income of $65,705 versus $35,878 for females. The per capita income for the township was $33,437. None of the families and 2.8% of the population were living below the poverty line, including no under eighteens and 23.0% of those over 64.

== Education ==
Wallace Township is in the Downingtown Area School District.

Almost all of the township is zoned to Springton Manor Elementary School, while a small part is zoned to Brandywine Wallace Elementary School.

Most of the township is zoned to Downingtown Middle School and Downingtown West High School, while a small portion is zoned to Lionville Middle School and Downingtown East High School.

== Transportation ==
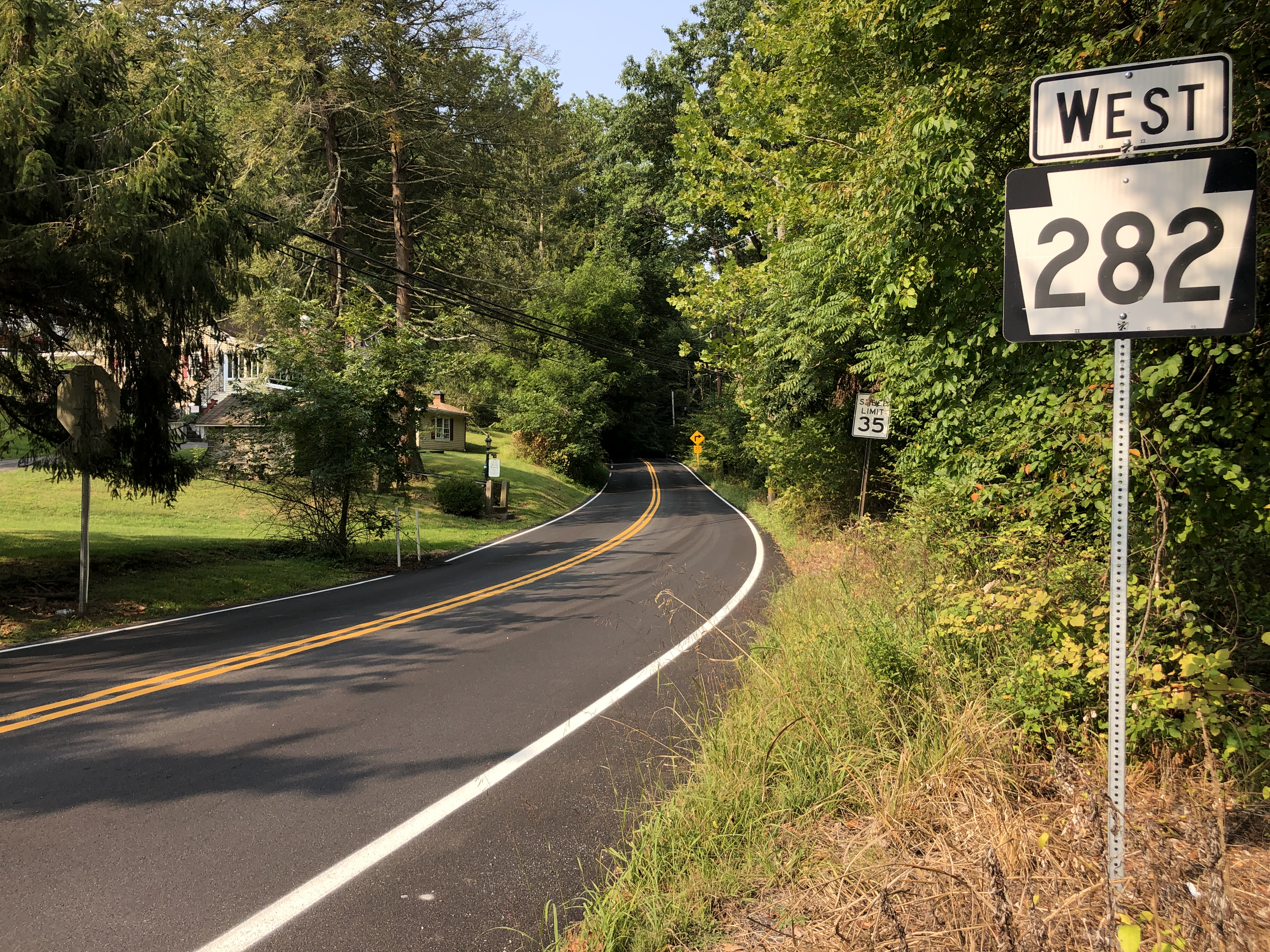
PA 282 westbound in Wallace Township

As of 2018, there were 36.93 miles (59.43 km) of public roads in Wallace Township, of which 2.90 miles (4.67 km) were maintained by the Pennsylvania Turnpike Commission (PTC), 14.82 miles (23.85 km) were maintained by the Pennsylvania Department of Transportation (PennDOT) and 19.21 miles were maintained by the township.

The Pennsylvania Turnpike (I-76) passes through the northeastern portion of the township along a northwest–southeast alignment, but the nearest interchange is at Pennsylvania Route 100 in Uwchlan Township. Pennsylvania Route 82 follows North Manor Road along a north–south alignment through the western corner of the township. Pennsylvania Route 282 follows Creek Road along a northwest–southeast alignment next to the East Branch Brandywine Creek through the center of the township.
