= Crouching Tiger (book) =

2011 picture book by Ying Chang Compestine

- Author: Ying Chang Compestine
- Illustrator: Yan Nascimbene
- Language: English
- Genre: children's books picture books
- Publisher: Candlewick
- Publication date: December 13, 2011
- Publication place: United States
- ISBN: 0763646423

Crouching Tiger is a children's picture book written by award-winning author, Ying Chang Compestine, and illustrated by Yan Nascimbene. Published in 2011 by Candlewick Press, the book tells the story of a young, Chinese-American boy who comes to appreciate his Chinese heritage thanks to his grandfather's tai chi lessons.

== Plot summary ==
In the Crouching Tiger, Vinson is visited by his grandfather from China. His grandfather calls him by his Chinese name, Ming Da, and encourages him to embrace his Chinese heritage by wearing traditional Chinese garb and learning tai chi. Vinson imagines his lessons will involve kicking and punching, like kung fu, but is disappointed to find out that tai chi is more meditative than confrontational. When Vinson and his grandfather attend the Chinese New Years parade, Vinson is surprised to see the great respect shown to his grandfather. As Vinson is invited to join in the parade, he realizes he can be proud about his heritage and plans on happily learning tai chi from his grandfather.

== Characters ==
- Vinson - Protagonist, also referred to as Ming Da
- Grandpa - Vinson's grandfather from China, trained in the martial arts

== Awards ==
- Panda Book Award in China
- The Morning Calm Award in South Korea
- The Chinese American Librarians Association Best Book of 2011
- CCBC Choice for 2012

== Critical reception ==
The Crouching Tiger has received praise from several organizations, including Publishers Weekly, New York Times Sunday Book Review, The Washington Post, Huffington Post, Chicago Tribune, San Francisco Chronicle, Kirkus Reviews, Book Dragon, Hapa Mama, Horn Book Magazine and Bookin’ with Sunny .
