= The Real Story of Stone Soup =

2007 picture book by Ying Chang Compestine

- Author: Ying Chang Compestine
- Illustrator: Stéphane Jorisch
- Language: English
- Genre: Children's books
- Publisher: Dutton Books for Young Readers
- Publication date: January 18, 2007
- Publication place: United States
- ISBN: 0525474935

The Real Story of Stone Soup is a picture book written by Ying Chang Compestine and illustrated by Stéphane Jorisch. The stone soup folk story is often associated with European folklore, but Compestine retells it set in China.

== Plot summary ==
The three Chang brothers are constantly overworked by a mean, old fisherman. One day the fisherman scolds the boys for forgetting to prepare his lunch. The boys gather fish and other ingredients to make a delicious soup, then decide to trick the fisherman by digging a hole, filling it with water, and tossing in rocks. They then convince the fisherman that this is how they prepared the soup using special "flavored rocks", astonishing the gullible fisherman. The narrator insists that this is the "real" stone soup story.

The book concludes with an author's note and a recipe for "Chang Brother's Egg Drop Stone Soup".

== Character list ==
- "Uncle" - Old Fisherman that the Chang boys refer to as "Uncle"
- Ting Chang - The eldest brother who works on Uncle’s boat
- Pong Chang - The middle brother who works on Uncle’s boat
- Kuai Chang - The youngest brother who works on Uncle’s boat

== Reception ==
The Real Story of Stone Soup has been featured in the School Library Journal, Booklist, Kirkus Reviews, and the Junior Library Guild. In School Libraries Worldwide, Sue Kimmel, a librarian, discusses how the book can be used to teach critical thinking and science concepts. The Chicago Sun-Times writes that the story is "deftly written with delicious tongue-in-cheek humor." The illustrations by Stephanie Jorisch are done in gouache and ink and are "expressive," according to Booklist.
