= William Ferguson Farm =

- U.S. National Register of Historic Places
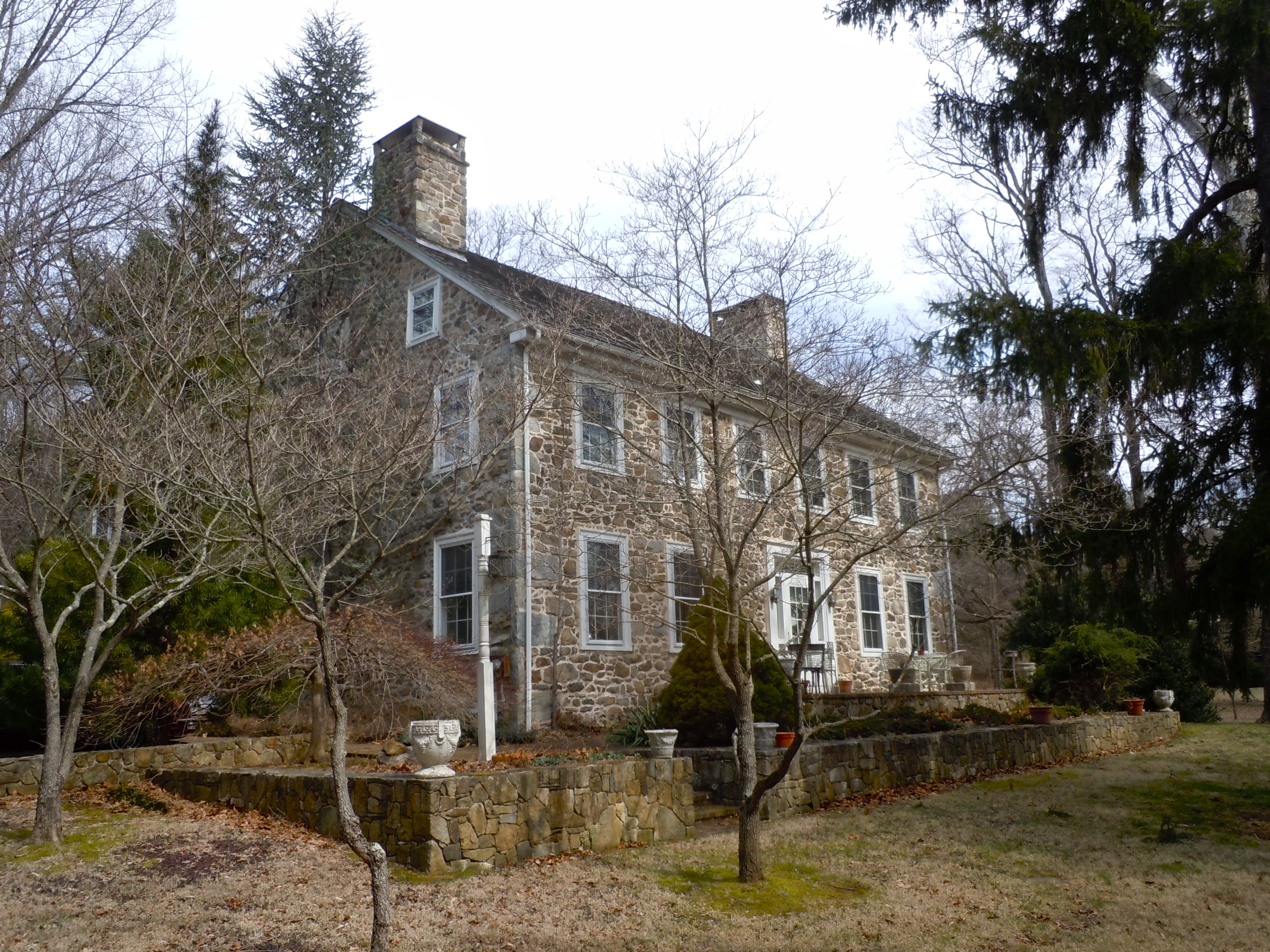
- William Ferguson Farmhouse, March 2011

- Location within Pennsylvania Location within the United States
- Location: East of Glenmoore on Marshall Road, Wallace Township, Pennsylvania
- Coordinates: 40°04′57″N 75°44′58″W
- Area: 22.3 acres (9.0 ha)
- Built: 1741
- Architectural style: Georgian, Federal
- NRHP reference No.: 80003460
- Added to NRHP: April 10, 1980

The William Ferguson Farm is an historic home and farm complex that is located in Wallace Township, Chester County, Pennsylvania, United States.

It was added to the National Register of Historic Places in 1980.

== History and architectural features ==
The farm has three contributing buildings, two contributing sites, and one contributing structure. They include the main house, a residence converted in 1957 from a former carriage house and granary, and Georgian and a Federal-style tenant house. The main house was built in two sections; the earlier dates to 1741 and the latter from circa 1830. It is a 2 1/2-story, six-bay by two-bay, fieldstone dwelling that was designed in the Georgian style.
