= Stone Soup =

European folk story

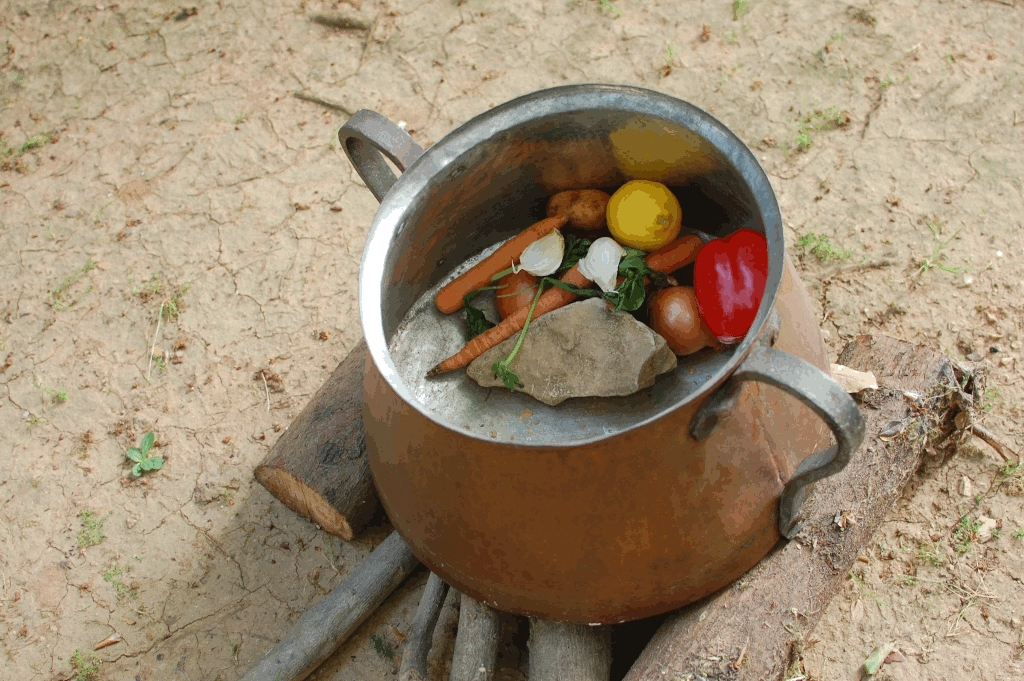
In the folk story, a pot that initially contains only a stone has other ingredients added to it.

"Stone Soup" is a European folk story in which hungry strangers convince the people of a town to each share a small amount of their food in order to make a meal. In varying traditions, the stone has been replaced with other common inedible objects, and therefore the parable is also known as axe soup, button soup, nail soup, bolt soup, and wood soup.

== Story ==
Various forms of the story exist; one example is:

Some travelers come to a village, carrying nothing more than an empty cooking pot. Upon their arrival, the villagers are unwilling to share any of their food stores with the very hungry travelers. Then the travelers go to a stream and fill the pot with water, drop a large stone in it, and place it over a fire. One of the villagers becomes curious and asks what they are doing. The travelers answer that they are making "stone soup", which tastes wonderful and which they would be delighted to share with the villager, although it still needs a little bit of garnish, which they are missing, to improve the flavor.

The villager, who anticipates enjoying a share of the soup, does not mind parting with a few carrots, so these are added to the soup. Another villager walks by, inquiring about the pot, and the travelers again mention their stone soup which has not yet reached its full potential. More and more villagers walk by, each adding another ingredient, like potatoes, onions, cabbages, peas, celery, tomatoes, meat, milk, butter, salt and pepper. Finally, the stone (being inedible) is removed from the pot, and a delicious and nourishing pot of soup is enjoyed by travelers and villagers alike. Although the travelers have thus tricked the villagers into sharing their food with them, they have successfully transformed it into a tasty meal which they share with the donors.

== Variations ==
- An Eastern European variation of the story (which is similar to the Northern European rendition) is called "axe soup", with an axe as the catalyst.
- In the French, Hungarian and Russian versions of the tale, the travelers are soldiers returning home.
  - In the Hungarian version, a single starving soldier tries to obtain food from villagers. He comes upon an old woman and tricks her into giving him the ingredients needed for the soup; At the end of the tale, they share the soup, and he sells the rock to the woman.
  - In Russian tradition, a soldier prepares "axe kasha" (Каша из топора). The tale ends with the soldier taking the axe when leaving, claiming he will eat it on the road.
- Johann Peter Hebel wrote a German version, "Der schlaue Pilgrim" ("The Cunning Pilgrim", 1811), in which a wily pilgrim, allegedly on his way to Jerusalem, tricks a hostess step-by-step into adding rich soup ingredients to his pebble stones, finally leaving the stones uneaten.
- In Northern European and Scandinavian countries, as well as Poland, the story is most commonly known as "nail soup", and the main character is typically a tramp looking for food and lodgings, who convinces an old woman that he will make a tasty nail soup for both of them if she would just add a few ingredients for the garnish.
- In the Portuguese tradition, the traveler is a monk, and the story takes place around Almeirim, Portugal. Nowadays sopa de pedra is considered a regional dish of Almeirim.
- The archetypal foolishness of the residents of the Dutch city of Kampen gave rise to the term "Kamper onion" (Kamper ui, plural: Kamper uien) for town-of-fools type stories: a tramp convinces a farmer and his wife that he knows how to cook a nutritious stew from onion and salt. But while cooking he adds plenty of other stuff "to improve the taste".

== Cultural and historical references ==
In the Aarne–Thompson–Uther folktale classification system, this tale and set of variants is type 1548.

=== Art, entertainment, and media ===
==== "Stone soup"-like collaborations ====
There are many examples of projects referencing the "Stone Soup" story's theme of making something significant by accumulating many small contributions. Examples include:

- Dungeon Crawl Stone Soup, a computer game which expanded on an abandoned project using contributions from many different coders
- Stone Soup, a children's literary magazine published by the California-based Children's Art Foundation since 1973
- Stone Soupercomputer, a computer composed of many small units
- Stone Soup, an open-source software project aimed at providing researchers and practitioners with a framework for the development and testing of Bayesian target tracking and state estimation algorithms.

=== Adaptations ===
==== Literature ====
William Butler Yeats' play The Pot of Broth (1904) tells a version of the story in which a clever Irish tramp uses his wits to swindle a shrewish medieval housewife out of her dinner.

The story is the basis of Marcia Brown's 1947 children's book Stone Soup: An Old Tale (1947), which features soldiers tricking miserly villagers into cooking them a feast. The book was a Caldecott Honor book in 1948 and was read aloud by the Captain (played by Bob Keeshan) on an early episode of Captain Kangaroo in the 1950s, as well as at least once in the 1960s or early 1970s.

In 1965, Gordon R. Dickson published a short story called "Soupstone", where a headstrong pilot is sent to solve a problem on a planet under the guise of a highly educated and competent official. Having read a French variant of the story, he applies the principle to the situation at hand and manages to solve the problem by pretending to understand everything, but actually merely making the locals apply their already present knowledge and skills to the task.

"Stone Soup" (1968), written by Ann McGovern and illustrated by Nola Langner, tells the story of a little old lady and a hungry young man at the door asking for food, and how he tricks her into making stone soup. The book was reprinted and reissued in 1986 with Winslow Pinney Pels as the illustrator.

Canadian children's author Aubrey Davis adapted the story to a Jewish context in his book Bone Button Borscht (1996). According to Davis, he wrote the story when he was unable to find a story that he liked for a Hanukkah reading. Barbara Budd's narration of Bone Button Borscht traditionally airs across Canada on CBC Radio One's As It Happens, on the first day of Hanukkah.

Jon J. Muth's children's book based on the story, also called Stone Soup (2003), is set in China, as is Ying Chang's The Real Story of Stone Soup (2007).

==== Music ====
Shel Silverstein's song "The Wonderful Soup Stone" tells a version of this story. Bobby Bare included the song on his album Lullabys, Legends and Lies (1973). and Dr. Hook & the Medicine Show included the song on their album Belly Up! (1973).

==== Television ====
- Jim Henson's The Storyteller series contains one tale called "A Story Short", in which the Storyteller himself (played by John Hurt) is the main character. In the beginning, he arrives at a castle where a man is thrown out for begging for food. He proceeds to trick the King's cook into making stone soup. After the people are happily fed, the cook realizes what has happened and pleads with the King to let him boil the Storyteller in oil, but the King instead offers a way out — to tell him a story every day for a year instead.
- The PBS Kids show Between the Lions featured an episode with a version of the story being read. In this version, the strangers were replaced by aliens.
- The tale was adapted as an episode of the show Hungarian Folktales.
- A Soviet cartoon based on the Russian variant of the tale was made in 1982.
- Robot Chicken Season 9, Episode 13 is entitled "Gimme That Chocolate Milk" and has a short sketch making fun of this parable. In it, the villagers kill the stranger who tricked them into sharing in order to cover up their "communal embarrassment".

=== Military tactics ===
US Army General George S. Patton referred to the "rock soup method" of acquiring resources for attacks in the face of official disapproval by his superiors for offensive operations. In the military context, he sent units forward, ostensibly on reconnaissance missions, where he knew resistance was to be met. "Surprised" at the enemy resistance, Patton would later request support for his scouts, and these missions eventually turned into small scale probing attacks. Then, once full combat had begun, Patton would request (or make the executive decision) to encircle or push full force against enemy resistance, under the rationale that the reinforcements were either bogged down or unable to retreat. He did this during the Battle of Sicily, in the advance on Palermo, and again in the campaign in northwest Europe, near Metz when his 3rd US Army was officially halted during Operation Market Garden.

=== Places ===
A large pool located on Karl Johan street in Oslo, funded by the steel company Christiania Spigerverk ("Christiania Nail Factory"), is nicknamed Spikersuppa literally meaning "Nail Soup" in Norwegian.

== See also ==
- Allegory of the long spoons – Parable about heaven and hell
- Tragedy of the commons – Overuse of a shared resource, the inverse of the Stone Soup story
- Purple hat therapy
