= Stone Soup Cooperative =

- Founded: 1997
- Type: Housing cooperative
- Purpose: Student housing, affordable housing, sustainability
- Location: Chicago, IL, United States
- Website: StoneSoupCoop.org

Stone Soup Cooperative is a housing cooperative created in Chicago, Illinois in 1997. A collective of activists working and living in Chicago began renting a former convent with the goal of creating an intentional community for "Joy and Justice." The cooperative was founded on the principle of the stone soup fable, which resonated with the original 10-12 founders. The story is a lesson in cooperation in which a town comes together to turn a pot of boiling water with a stone in it into a hearty soup that can be shared amongst all its inhabitants by each adding one ingredient.

In 2000, members raised enough money for a down payment on the Leland House and in 2003 the collective jointly purchased Hoyne House.
