= The Runaway Rice Cake =

2001 children's picture book

- Author: Ying Chang Compestine
- Language: English
- Genre: Children's books
- Publisher: Simon & Schuster Books for Young Readers
- Publication date: January 1, 2001
- Publication place: United States
- ISBN: 0689829728

The Runaway Rice Cake is a picture book written by Ying Chang Compestine and illustrated by Tungwai Chau. The book tells the story of the Chang family and the sense of community that can be born from a simple act of kindness.

== Plot summary ==
In the Runaway Rice Cake, the poor Chang family has hardly any food to celebrate the Chinese New Year. When they finally manage to put together a rice cake, it suddenly comes to life and leaps away. The Chang family chases the rice cake all through the village until it comes across a hungry old lady. Realizing she is hungrier than they are, the Chang's offer the old woman some of the rice cake, but she eats all of it. The community is moved by the Chang's willingness to give up their only meal, so when they return home, the family is greeted by a wheelbarrow full of what little food the community could gather for the New Year's celebration. These acts of selflessness earn the praise of the Kitchen God who decides to award the village. The story is similar to The Gingerbread Man.

The book concludes with an author's note, including instructions on how to celebrate the New Years and a recipe for "Baked Nian-Gao" and "Steamed Nian Gao". There is also a pronunciation guide for readers unfamiliar with Chinese words.

== Character list ==
- Momma Chang - Ming's mother
- Poppa Chang - Ming's father
- Ming - Son of Mama and Poppa Chang
- Cong - Son of Mama and Poppa Chang
- Da - Son of Mama and Poppa Chang
- Rice Cake - Magical Rice Cake
- Old Woman - Poor, hungry old lady

== Critical reception ==
The Runaway Rice Cake has been reviewed in Publishers Weekly, Booklist, Kirkus Reviews, School Library Journal, and Book Dragon. Library Talk praised the full color, acrylic illustrations painted by Tungwai Chau. School Library Journal called the illustrations "whimsical."
