= D Is for Dragon Dance =

2007 picture book by Ying Chang Compestine

D Is For Dragon Dance
- Author: Ying Chang Compestine
- Language: English
- Genre: children's books picture books
- Publisher: Holiday House, Inc.
- Publication date: April 28, 2007
- Publication place: United States
- ISBN: 9780823420582
- OCLC: 56213939

D Is For Dragon Dance is a 2007 children's picture book written by Ying Chang Compestine and illustrated by Yongsheng Xuan. The book explores the Chinese New Years traditions through a rhyming acrostic format using the English alphabet. The book concludes with an author's note, an artist's note, and a recipe for "New Year's Dumpling Delight".

== Featured Chinese New Year traditions ==
A few of the Chinese New Year traditions featured in the book include:

- Watching the Dragon Dance performance in the New Year's parade
- Lighting firecrackers
- Hanging paper lanterns
- Eating Peking Duck
- Children receiving Red Envelopes full of gifts
- Eating Steamed Dumplings
- Performing Veneration for one's ancestors
- Creating Xylographs
- Welcoming the Chinese Zodiac for the new year

== Reception ==
D Is For Dragon Dance has received praise from several organizations including Kirkus Reviews, and Booklist.
