= Secrets of the Terra-Cotta Soldier =

- Author: Ying Chang Compestine
- Language: English
- Genre: Action, historical fiction, adventure
- Publisher: Abrams Books
- Publication date: January 7, 2014
- Publication place: United States
- ISBN: 1419705407

Secrets of the Terra-Cotta Soldier is a 2014 children's historical novel with fantasy elements written by Ying Chang Compestine and her son, Vinson Compestine. It is set in 1970s China.

== Plot summary ==
The story follows thirteen-year-old Ming, who lives in Communist China during the 1970s. Ming's father believes the lost tomb of Emperor Qin Shi Huang lies beneath the village and is forced to prove so before the village Political Officer sends him to a labor camp. While Ming's father is away on business, Ming befriends a Terra-Cotta soldier who has come to life. Together they embark on an adventure to uncover the mysteries of Emperor Qin's Mausoleum and save Ming's father's life.^{[2][3]}

== Characters ==
- Ming - Protagonist, an archaeologist's son
- Ba Ba - Ming's father, an archaeologist
- Shí - A Terra-Cotta Soldier from Emperor Qin's Terra-Cotta army
- Gee Brothers - Farmers, first to unearth the Terra-Cotta Soldier[2]
- Political Officer (Goat Face) - Antagonist, political officer of Red Star, a Maoist government department
- Emperor Qin Shi Huang - First emperor of China
- Teacher Panda - Ming's teacher
- Old men in tea-house - Ming's friends
- Feng - Shí's best friend, a Terra-Cotta soldier
- Liang - Shí's mentor
- Political Officer's Wife
- General Wang - Famous general in Emperor Qin's army, a Terra-Cotta soldier
- Si Ji - A Terra-Cotta soldier
- Director Gu - Ba Ba's friend, director of the Xi’an Museum
- Comrade Ding - New political officer of Red Star

== Critical reception ==
Secrets of the Terra-Cotta Soldier has received praise from readers and other literary organizations such as Publishers Weekly, Kirkus Reviews, Common Sense Media, and The Bulletin of the Center for Children's Books.

== Awards ==
- CALA Best Book Award of 2014
