= A Banquet for Hungry Ghosts =

A Banquet for Hungry Ghosts: A Collection of Deliciously Frightening Tales
- Author: Ying Chang Compestine
- Language: English
- Genre: Horror, Young adult fiction, Short stories
- Publisher: Tumbling Dumpling Media
- Publication date: February 25, 2016
- Publication place: United States
- ISBN: 0997218703

Table of contents, or "menu", for A Banquet for Hungry Ghosts

A Banquet for Hungry Ghosts: A collection of Deliciously Frightening Tales is a young adult fiction book written by Ying Chang Compestine. Set in China, the book blends Chinese culture, cuisine, and modern customs into eight horror stories.^{[1][2]}

== Plot summary ==
The tales in A Banquet for Hungry Ghosts spans across China, ranging from 200 BC to the modern technological world. In Chinese legends, people who die hungry return as vengeful ghosts to haunt the living. Some of these ghosts can be calmed with food, but others have more malicious desires. In addition to focusing on the cuisine and ghosts stories of Chinese culture, each tale has socially conscious undertones which explore the abuse of power and class disparity across China. Each ghost acts as a champion for the poor and powerless people, helping them obtain justice.

The book is organized as a Chinese menu. From appetizers and main courses to desserts, every story ends with an authors note and a recipe based on the story.

=== The Appetizers ===
==== Steamed Dumplings ====
Jiang, a greedy businessman, opens up a haunted inn and skimps out on the ingredients in his dumplings. The events that follow are less than savory.

==== Tea Eggs ====
After a tragic accident at the fireworks factory in Yun's school, many people are affected, but none more than the undertakers of the "room of the dead". After all, hungry ghosts rarely stay dead.

=== The Main Courses ===
==== Beef Stew ====
After an accident at work, Chou is left to eat his favorite meal while he awaits capital punishment. Meanwhile, the rich and powerful have other plans instore for him.

==== Tofu with Chili-Garlic Sauce ====
Dr. Zhou, one of the best surgeons in China, is haunted by a deceased patient after eating a lavish banquet.

==== Long-Life Noodles ====
Master Ma's disappearance is shrouded in mystery until his successor, Master Chen, eats long-life noodles, flavored with the exotic shiitake mushrooms. Something tragic happens.

==== Egg Stir-Fried Rice ====
Madame Peng gives the phrase "evil stepmother" a whole new meaning and the dead take notice.

=== The Desserts ===
==== Jasmine Almond Cookies ====
The Lee family names their three boys after the best dishes served at their restaurant. After their oldest son dies, they take offerings to his grave. But some strange things happen to the offering at the graveyard.

==== Eight-Treasure Rice Pudding ====
Wei is furious when his father kills his pet praying mantis. He thinks the death of his father will set him free, but the consequences are worse than he imagined.

== Character List ==
=== Appetizers ===
==== Steamed Dumplings ====
- Mu- previous innkeeper of the Double Happy
- Fur Hat- worker on the Great Wall of China
- Cotton Jacket- worker on the Great Wall of China
- Jiang- modern day successful businessman from Beijing
- Uncle- Jiang's uncle
- Dave- American students tourist
- Chef- cook at the new Double Happy Inn

==== Tea Eggs ====
- Yun- protagonist, middle school student
- Ming- Yun's friend
- Gui- Yun's friend
- Bo- Yun's friend
- Mother- Yun's mother
- Father- Yun's father
- Principal
- Miàn Tiáo (Noodle)- Undertaker
- Dōng Guā (Melon)- Undertaker

=== Main Courses ===
==== Beef Stew ====
- Chou- protagonist
- Broken Faucet- Chou's employer
- Female Officer- medical examiner
- Li Zen- judge
- Chief Lo- police chief

==== Tofu with Chili-Garlic Sauce ====
- Dr. Zhou- protagonist, surgeon
- Shao Ren- patient of Dr. Zhou
- Mr. Ren- father of Shao Ren
- Mrs. Ren- mother of Shao Ren
- Dr. Zan- Dr. Zhou's assistant
- City Mayor
- Mr. Lin- Mayor's assistant
- Long Legs- waitress
- Officer Wang- police officer

==== Long-Life Noodles ====
- Master Ma- old head monk at Wu Jing Temple
- Master Chen- new head monk at Wu Jing Temple
- Cong- youngest monk at Wu Jing Temple
- Master Lung- monk at Wu Jing Temple, chef
- Chief Xiong- police chief

==== Egg Stir-Fried Rice ====
- Fong- protagonist
- Madame Peng- antagonist, Fong's stepmother
- Mr. Yue- Fong's father
- Housekeeper Ting

=== Desserts ===
==== Jasmine Almond Cookies ====
- Almond Cookie Lee- oldest son
- Barbecue Ribs Lee- middle son
- Drumsticks in Curry Sauce Lee- youngest son
- Mr. Lee- parent, restaurateur
- Mrs. Lee- parent, restaurateur
- Mrs. Qian- friend of Lees, hair salon owner
- Mr. Zong- frequent customer at Lees' restaurant

==== Eight-Treasure Rice Pudding ====
- Wei- protagonist
- Master Shi- Wei's father
- Tutor- Wei's tutor
- Cai- Wei's friend
- Ban- Wei's friend
- Liang- Wei's friend

== Television and film adaptation ==
In October 2021, it was reported that 108 Media would be adapting the book into an animated television series with Tricia Lee as writer. No further development had been reported.

In November 2025, it was announced that the book would be adapted into an animated anthology film instead of a show. Produced by Singaporean company Robot Playground Media, the film will have several different studios from other countries providing animation.

== Critical reception ==
A Banquet for Hungry Ghosts has received good reviews from readers and other literary organizations such as Publishers Weekly, School Library Journal, Booklist, The Horn Book Magazine, and Kirkus Reviews.

== Awards ==
- Notable Book for 2010 by the Children's Literary Assembly
- AARP Grandparent's Book for Children
