= Cobblestone School =

Coordinates: 43°9′22.7″N 77°35′26.4″W

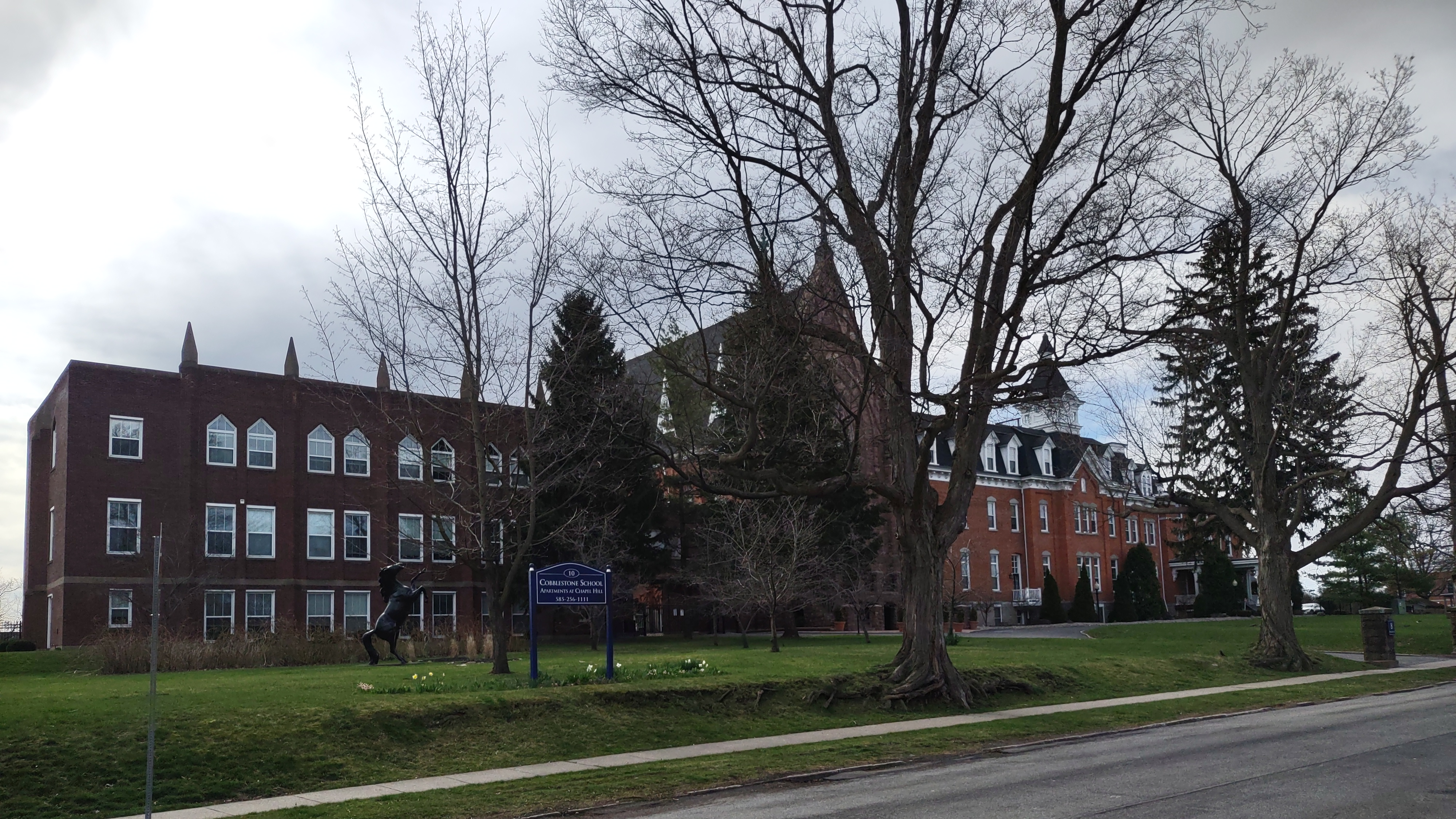
- Rochester, New York

Information
- Type: Private, alternative
- Motto: Where Children Love to Learn
- Established: 1983; 43 years ago
- Closed: 2015; 11 years ago
- Head of school: Rose Martin
- Staff: 3
- Faculty: 17
- Grades: PK-6
- Enrollment: 60
- Website: http://www.cobblestone.org/

Cobblestone School was a progressive, alternative private school in Rochester, New York. It was a member of the National Coalition of Alternative Community Schools and the Greater Rochester Association of Private Schools.

Cobblestone was a small school, numbering around 60 students in grades Pre-K thru 6. It was located on Prince Street in the former Sacred Heart Academy school building. Nearby was SOTA, a public high school that emphasized the arts. Many Cobblestone students continued on to this school after graduating.

== History ==
Cobblestone School was founded in 1983, teaching children between ages 4½ and 12 years in grades pre-kindergarten through six. In 1999, grades seven and eight were added, but then in the 2010–2011 school year grades seven and eight were phased out due to low enrollment.

In 2015, Cobblestone School closed due to lack of funding.

== Grades and classes ==
The school was divided into four age groups. Within each group, sequential grade levels are combined in the same classroom. Each student stays in the same classroom (typically with the same teacher) for two consecutive years before moving on.

- Primary Group (ages 4½-6)
  - Pre-Kindergarten and Kindergarten
- Upper Primary Group (ages 6–8)
  - 1st and 2nd grades
- Intermediate Group (ages 8–10)
  - 3rd and 4th grades
- Middle Grades Group (ages 10–12)
  - 5th and 6th grades (Lower Middle Grade)

Classes are small. The student-teacher ratio is 12:1 in the lower levels and 15:1 in the upper levels.

== Evaluation of students ==
Cobblestone did not administer standardized tests or grades. Instead, teachers kept a portfolio for each student to monitor and record the student's individual development.
