= Upattinas School and Resource Center =

Former private school in Pennsylvania

Coordinates: 40.09956°N 75.72643°W

Location
- 429 Greenridge Road; Glenmoore, Chester County, Pennsylvania 19343; United States

Information
- School type: Democratic school, private school
- Established: 1971
- Grades: K–12
- Student to teacher ratio: 10:1
- Classrooms: Multi-age; Lower School (K–8); High School (9–12)
- Website: upattinas.org

Upattinas School and Resource Center was a private, non-profit school that served students in kindergarten through twelfth grade, as well as a homeschool resource center. Located in Glenmoore, Pennsylvania, Upattinas was a democratic school where everyone—staff, students, parents, and board—had the opportunity to participate in school governance.

Upattinas Open Community Corporation was licensed by the Commonwealth of Pennsylvania as a Private Academic School, authorized by the Department of Immigration to grant I-20 status to non-immigrant students from other countries, and recognized by the Commonwealth of Pennsylvania to issue a Home Education Diploma.

== History ==
Upattinas was founded in 1971 by twenty-one families. The school moved to the top of Valley Forge Mountain. In 1978 the school moved to Glenmoore, Pennsylvania.

In 1983 Upattinas became active in the National Coalition of Alternative Community Schools (NCACS). A resource center for home education was created in 1986. In 1991 a sister school in Japan, the Nomugi Open Community School, was founded.

Upattinas closed at the end of the 2013-14 academic year.

== Overview ==
The Upattinas mission was "to nurture and inspire interest-driven, noncoercive learning in an open democratic community."

The staff, students, and parents believed:

- That education should be rigorous, all-encompassing, but not rigid.
- That an environment conducive to thought is most important environment.
- That freedom of thought and expression is vital.
- In diversity and nondiscrimination.
- In reading deeply and discussing the works that shaped our world.
- That we must work for environmental renewal and global justice.

All students at Upattinas were invited to participate in the democratic governance of the school. Students were expected to attend the weekly All-School Meeting, and participation in various social and work committees was encouraged.
