= Glenmoore, Pennsylvania =

Unincorporated community in Pennsylvania, US

- Unincorporated community
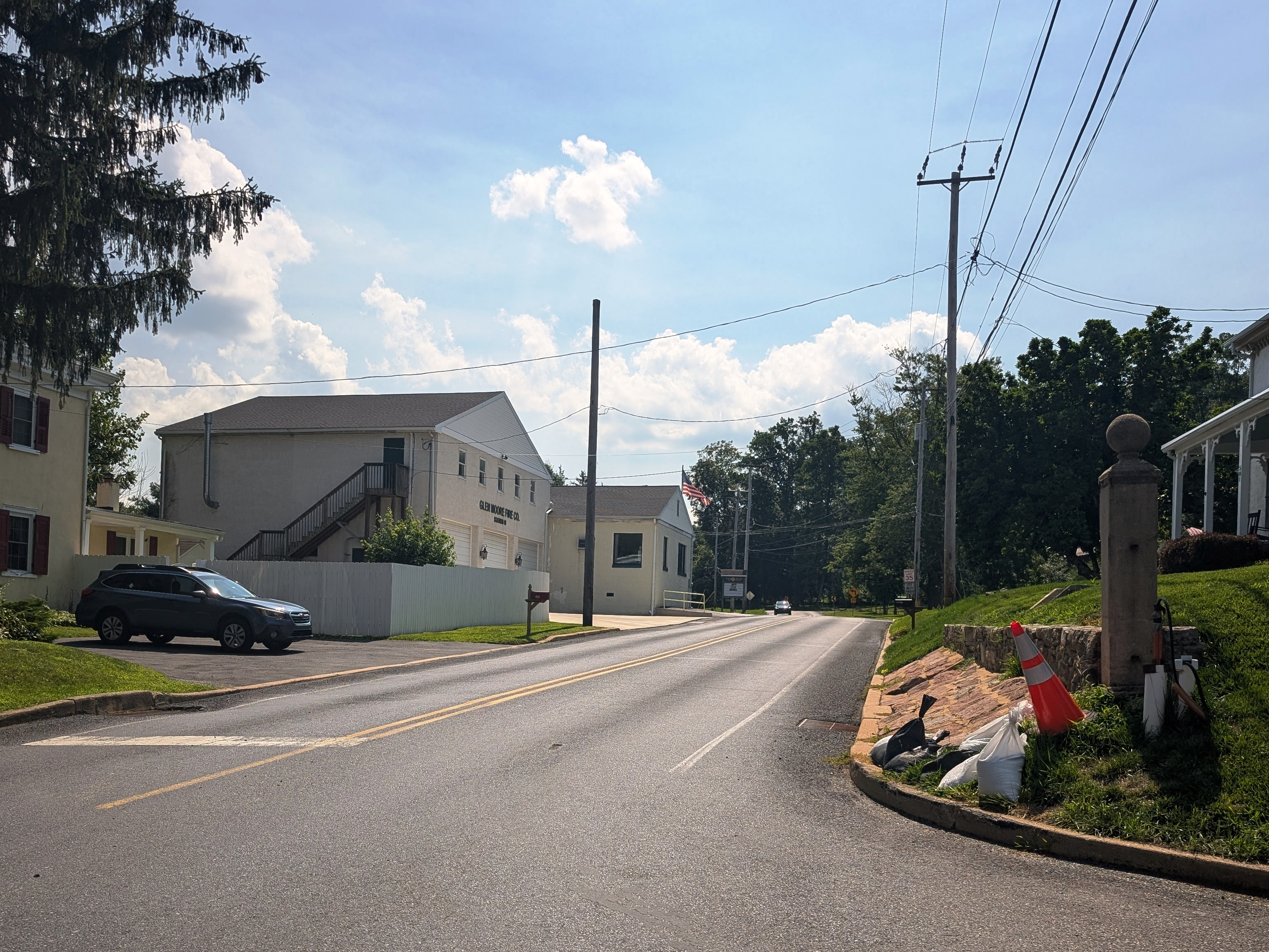
- Fairview Road in the center of Glenmoore

- Location in Chester County and the U.S. state of Pennsylvania

- Location of Glenmoore in Pennsylvania Glenmoore, Pennsylvania (the United States)
- Coordinates: 40°05′20″N 75°46′19″W
- Country: United States
- State: Pennsylvania
- County: Chester
- Township: Wallace

Area
  - Total: 12.1 sq mi (31 km^{2})
  - Land: 12.0 sq mi (31 km^{2})
  - Water: 0.1 sq mi (0.26 km^{2})
- Elevation: 446 ft (136 m)

Population (2020)
  - Total: 872
  - Density: 72.7/sq mi (28.1/km^{2})
- Time zone: UTC-5 (EST)
  - Summer (DST): UTC-4 (EDT)
- ZIP code: 19343
- Area codes: 610 and 484

Glenmoore is an unincorporated community that is located in Chester County, Pennsylvania in the United States. It is part of the Philadelphia Metropolitan Area and lies within Wallace Township.

As of 2020, it had a population of 872.

== History ==
- Glenmoore Historic District
- U.S. National Register of Historic Places
- Location within Pennsylvania
- Location: At the jct of Fairview and Creek Rds, roughly bounded by Park Ln, Indiantown Rd, and Howson Ln, Wallace, Pennsylvania
- Area: 70 acres (28 ha)
- Built: 1861
- Architect: Lammey, John; Kaempfer, William
- Architectural style: Late Victorian, Gothic Revival
- NRHP reference No.: 11000107
- Added to NRHP: March 18, 2011

In 1869 a post office was established under the name Norwood, a contraction of "North Woods."

The village was originally called Norwood, but in 1874 the name was changed to Glenmoore in recognition of the founder and the fact that it is in a narrow valley, or glen.

It was the birthplace of William Moore McClure, a Union Army colonel during the Civil War. According to DeLeon, Glenmoore is home of "... the smallest church in the world..." where the downtown is so small that it "... consists of an intersection with no traffic and one antiques shop next to a convenience store...."

The Glenmoore Historic District was listed on the National Register of Historic Places in 2011. It encompasses 56 contributing buildings.

It is notable for being the site of the Upattinas School and Resource Center (1971–2014).

== Geography ==
Glenmoore is located on Pennsylvania Route 282.

== Gallery ==
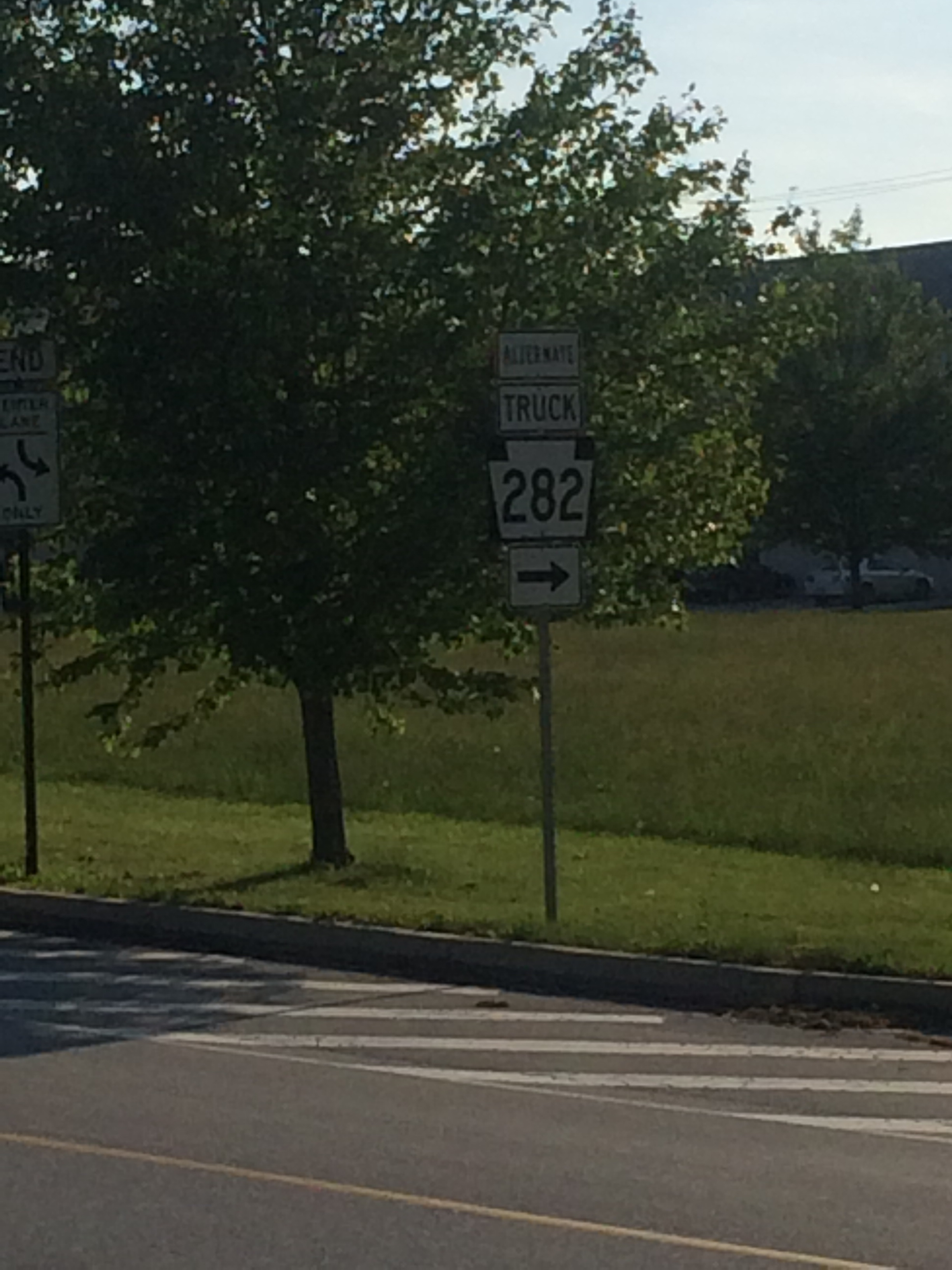
PA 282 Alternate Truck in Eagle, Pennsylvania going towards Glenmoore

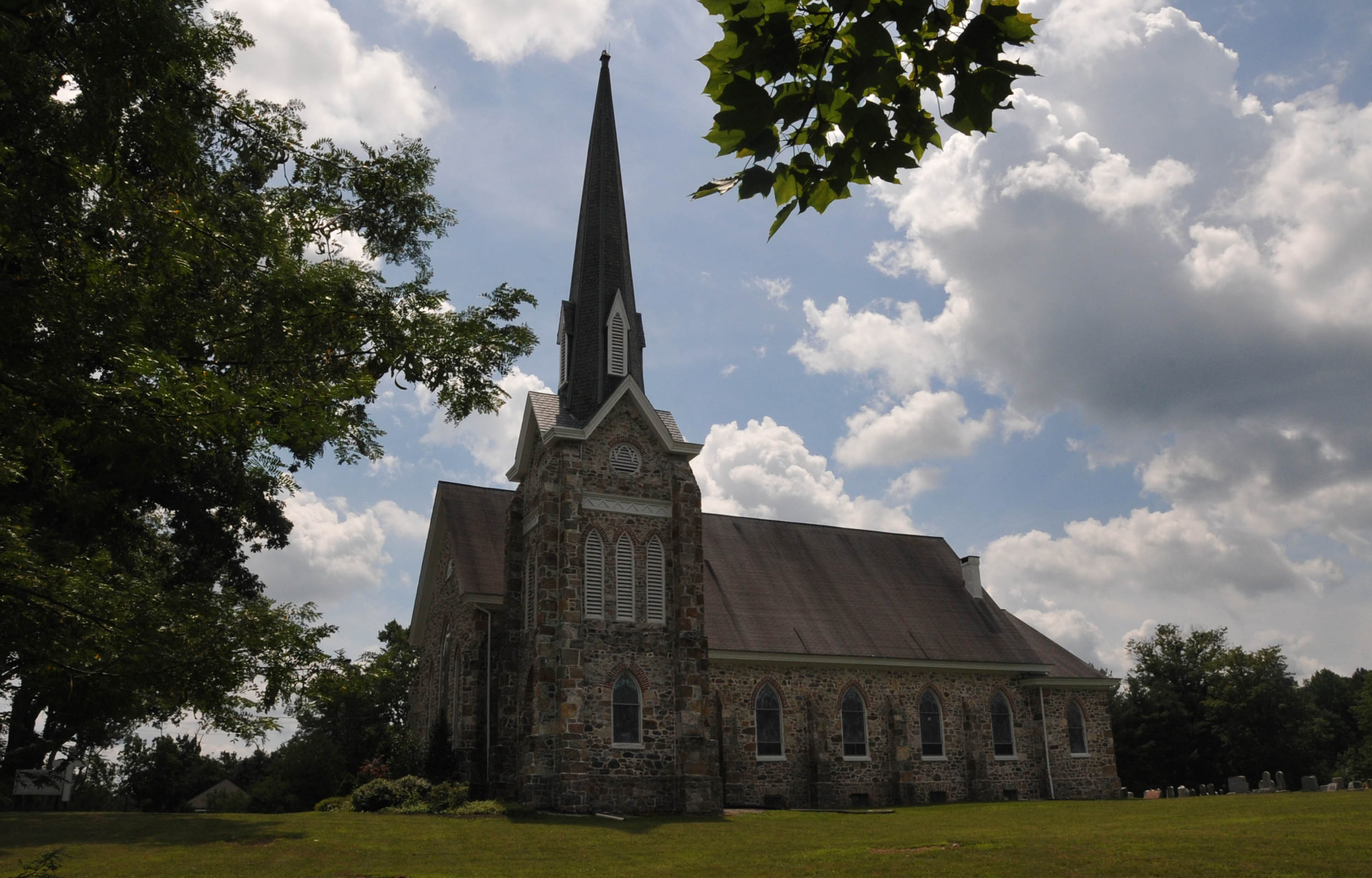
Methodist church, which was established in the early 1800s by James Moore
