= The Story of (book series) =

Series of picture books by Ying Chang Compestine

The Story of (series)
- Author: Ying Chang Compestine
- Illustrator: Yongsheng Xuan
- Language: English, Chinese
- Genre: Children's books, Cultural studies
- Publisher: Holiday House
- Publication date: September 2001
- Publication place: United States
- ISBN: 0823415260
- OCLC: 44467394

The Story of series is a collection of children's picture books that were written by Ying Chang Compestine and illustrated by Yongsheng Xuan. Each installation depicts the invention of various objects in Chinese culture, including chopsticks, noodles, kites, and paper. An author's note and recipe is included at the end of each book. The first publication of The Story of Chopsticks was printed in English in 2001 by Holiday House. In 2016, the bilingual edition was printed in English and Chinese by Immedium. The illustrations, done by Xuan use traditional Chinese-style cut paper.

== The Story of Chopsticks ==
=== Plot summary ===
In the Story of Chopsticks, each meal is a battle for Kuai as he struggles against his two elder brothers to get to the food. In an act of witty desperation, Kuai uses two sticks to reach for the food that is too hot for his brothers' bare hands and unknowingly starts the tradition of chopsticks. The book concludes with an author's note, instructions for making chopsticks, and a recipe for "Sweet Eight Treasures Rice Pudding".

=== Character list ===
- Pan Kang - Son of Mama and Papa
- Ting Kang - Son of Mama and Papa
- Kùai Kang - Son of Mama and Papa
- Mama - Mother of Pan, Ting, and Kùai
- Papa - Father of Pan, Ting, and Kùai
- Mr. Wang - Friend of the Kangs
- Mr. Lee - Village wiseman

== The Story of Noodles ==
=== Plot summary ===
The Kang brothers ruin the dumpling ingredients their mother was going to use for the village cooking contest. Instead, they accidentally invent noodles. The book concludes with an author's note and a recipe for "Long Life Noodles".

=== Character list ===
- Mama - Mother of Pan, Ting, and Kùai
- Pan Kang - Son of Mama and Papa
- Ting Kang - Son of Mama and Papa
- Kùai Kang - Son of Mama and Papa
- Papa - Father of Pan, Ting, and Kùai
- Aunt Lee - Competitor in dumpling contest
- Scholar - Judge in dumpling contest
- Chef - Judge in dumpling contest
- Matchmaker - Judge in dumpling contest

== The Story of Kites ==
=== Plot summary ===
In the Story of Kites, the three Kang brothers bang pots and pans together in an attempt to chase birds from the rice fields. After that fails, they decide to make man-made wings out of chopsticks, feathers, and their math homework. The book has been published in English and Chinese. It concludes with an author's note and instructions on how to make a kite.

=== Character list ===
- Ting Kang - Son of Mama and Papa
- Pan Kand - Son of Mama and Papa
- Kùai Kand - Son of Mama and Papa
- Mama - Mother of Pan, Ting, and Kùai
- Papa - Father of Pan, Ting, and Kùai
- Villagers

== The Story of Paper ==
=== Plot summary ===
Long ago, before paper was invented in China, people wrote on their hands or the ground. In the Story of Paper, the naughty Kang brothers get in trouble at school and the teacher leaves a note on their hands for the whole village to see. To avoid embarrassment, the Kang brothers decide to invent something to hide the note from the villagers and their parents. The book concludes with an author's note and instructions for making "Homemade Garden Paper".

=== Character list ===
- Pan Kang - Son of Mama and Papa
- Ting Kang - Son of Mama and Papa
- Kùai Kang - Son of Mama and Papa
- Mama - Mother of Pan, Ting, and Kùai
- Papa - Father of Pan, Ting, and Kùai
- Teacher - Pan, Ting, and Kùai's teacher
