= Stonesoup School =

Coordinates: 29.4268°N 81.5707°W

StoneSoup School
- Crescent City, Florida

Information
- Type: Private, Alternative
- Motto: Qua Liberi Exsisto
- Established: 1971
- Founder: Sue Buie, David Gluckman, Linton Hutchinson, Rainbow Williams
- Director: Consensus (no director)
- Chaplain: Frank Beeman
- Grades: PreK-12
- Enrollment: 30
- Colors: Aqua and White
- Sports: Fencing, Backgammon
- Mascot: Conan
- Tuition: Sliding Scale
- Website: web.archive.org/web/20081216012326/http://www.stonesoupschool.org/

StoneSoup School was an alternative private school located in Crescent City, Florida in the United States. It was a member of the National Coalition of Alternative Community Schools.

== Overview ==
StoneSoup School was a small alternative school based on Summerhill School, numbering around 30 students in the Pre-K through 12 grade. It was located on 66 acres (270,000 m^{2}) in Crescent City Florida.

== History ==
StoneSoup School, first called the 'Alternative School', was charted in 1971, and grew out of the Saturday School project started by Sue Buie, Annette Chioma, and Rainbow Williams. The school met at 1304 Richmond Road in Winter Park, Florida and soon moved to Dee Vicker's old Victorian house during the summer of 1969. The school grew quickly and tried using Seminole county school facilities but found this unsatisfactory.

The school was based on Summerhill School, a democratic school founded by A.S. Neill in 1921 in England. As education in America moved towards more testing to exams and accountability, Stonesoup did not. Linton Hutchinson incorporated the theories of Carl Rogers, Jean Houston, John C. Lilly, humanistic psychology and information from Jane Roberts and alternative education models. Archie Patterson Buie Jr., who was trying to change the educational system from within as an elected Seminole County School Board Member, became disenchanted with the slowness of the process and joined StoneSoup bringing transformational practices being explored at Esalen Institute. Psychodrama, autogenics, and hypnosis became staples of the StoneSoup process.

The school continued to grow as it moved to a full-time live-in school in Crescent City, Florida.

== Grades and classes ==
The school was designed without grades or levels. Classes were based on student and staff interests. Attendance was determined by student choice with a narrative report generated at the end of the class collectively by students and staff.

== Evaluation of students ==
StoneSoup did not administer standardized tests or grades. Instead, staff and students generate a narrative evaluation at the end of the class. Equivalent "letter grades" in subject areas provided to facilitate the student's transition to universities and colleges.
