= Ying Chang Compestine =

American writer

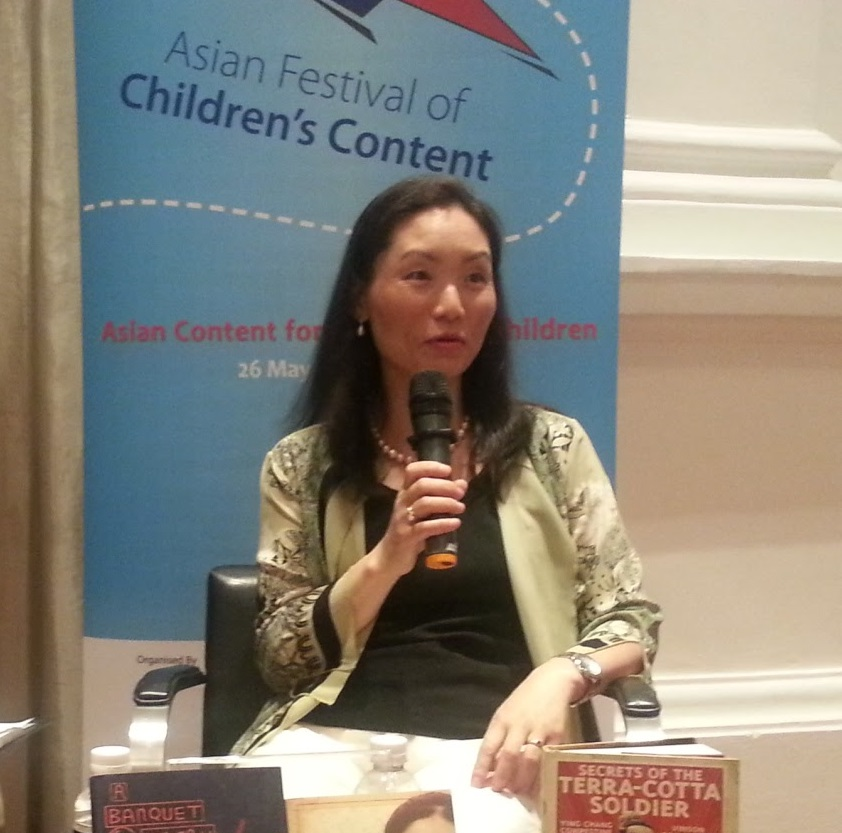
- Compestine in 2014
- Born: 張瀛; March 8, 1963 (age 63); Wuhan, Hubei, China
- Education: Central China Normal University; University of Colorado Boulder
- Occupation: Author
- Spouse: Greg M. Compestine
- Children: 1
- Writing career
- Language: English
- Genres: Fiction, children's books, cookbooks, historical fiction, cultural studies
- Notable work: Revolution Is Not a Dinner Party (2007)

Chinese name
- Traditional Chinese: 張瀛
- Simplified Chinese: 张瀛
Transcriptions
Standard Mandarin
- Hanyu Pinyin: Zhāng Yíng
- Wade–Giles: Chang^{1} Ying^{2}
- Website: www.yingc.com

Ying Chang Compestine (born March 8, 1963) is a Chinese American author, speaker, television host and chef. She has written over 27 books, including the novel Revolution Is Not a Dinner Party based on her life growing up during the Chinese Cultural Revolution, and a middle grade novel, Morning Sun in Wuhan, set in Wuhan, China.

== Biography ==
Ying Chang Compestine was born and raised in Wuhan, China, during the Chinese Cultural Revolution. Her family was considered "bourgeois," so the Red Guard took her family's belongings and her father was put in jail twice. Because of the family's difficulties, Compestine was sent to live with her grandparents.

Compestine earned a degree in English and American literature and taught English in China. She also worked as an interpreter for China's Bureau of Seismology.

Compestine graduated with a master's degree in sociology from the University of Colorado, Boulder in 1990. She met her husband just before she finished graduate school. Before becoming an award-winning author, she taught sociology at various universities and colleges in the U.S. and China until 1998.

== Career ==
After immigrating to the United States, Compestine taught sociology and writing at universities in both the U.S. and China. Compestine has received various education awards including the Master Teacher Award from both Front Range Community College (1991–1992) and the International School of Beijing (2000).

Compestine has hosted several cooking shows on Chinese Language News Broadcaster for Phoenix North America Chinese Channel, as well as appearing as a guest on the Food Network, Discovery Channel, and HGTV. She also worked a food editor for Martha Stewart's Body + Soul magazine and is a contributor for Cooking Light, EatingWell, Self, and Men's Health. Compestine is also a spokesperson for Nestle and Celestial Seasonings.

=== Writing career ===
Compestine’s writing often combines Chinese food, folklore, history, family stories, and cultural memory. Across cookbooks, picture books, young adult novels, memoir, and graphic works, her books frequently explore identity, resilience, intergenerational relationships, and the meeting of Eastern and Western perspectives.

Compestine began writing after the birth of her son. Her first book was the cookbook Secrets of Fat-Free Chinese Cooking, published in 1997. She later began writing books for children, drawing on her memories of China, her family, and Chinese culture. Her work spans cookbooks, picture books, young adult fiction, memoir, and graphic works, and frequently incorporates Chinese food, folklore, history, festivals, and family traditions.

Her young adult novel Revolution Is Not a Dinner Party (2007) draws on her childhood experiences during the Cultural Revolution. The book was included in the 2008 American Library Association’s Best Books for Young Adults list and Publishers Weekly’s Best Children’s Books of 2007.

In 2014, Compestine co-authored Secrets of the Terra-Cotta Soldier with her son Vinson.

Her middle-grade novel Morning Sun in Wuhan, set during the early months of the COVID-19 pandemic, was published in 2022.

Her picture book memoir Growing Up Under a Red Flag (2024), illustrated by Xinmei Liu, recounts her childhood during the Chinese Cultural Revolution. The book received starred reviews from School Library Journal, Publishers Weekly, and Booklist, and was selected as a Junior Library Guild Gold Standard Selection.

Other recent picture books include Ra Pu Zel and the Stinky Tofu (2024), illustrated by Crystal Kung, and The Chinese New Year Helper (2025), illustrated by Ginnie Hsu.

Compestine’s young adult novel A Banquet for Hungry Ghosts has been developed as an animated adaptation by Robot Playground Media. Public descriptions of the project describe it as an animated horror anthology based on the book, blending Chinese customs, culture, cuisine, and ghost stories.

Her graphic novel cookbook Buddha Jumps over the Wall, and Other Curiously Named Classic Chinese Dishes: A Graphic Cookbook—26 Recipes & Stories was published by Chronicle Books in March 2025. The book combines recipes with the folkloric stories behind classic Chinese dishes. In 2025, Google Play named it its “Favorite Graphic Novel” in its Best of 2025 books list.

== Speaking career ==
Compestine has presented as a speaker, author, and guest chef on cruise ships, at resorts, schools, conferences, and other venues, including The World Residences at Sea, Silversea, Crystal, Canyon Ranch, and TCS World Travel.

Her speaking topics include her childhood in China during the Cultural Revolution, resilience and storytelling, Asian culture and cuisine, healthy living and cooking, and the writing and publishing process. She also presents programs that combine memoir, food, culture, and wellness. Canyon Ranch lists Compestine as a guest expert and describes her as a nationally recognized authority on culture and cuisine, an award-winning author, and a former food editor for Martha Stewart’s Whole Living magazine. The profile also notes that she speaks for cruise ships, private jet journeys, resorts, and organizations worldwide, and that her programs address her writing journey, her life in Wuhan, China, and healthy eating and living.

Recent program topics have included healthspan and lifespan, the healing power of personal storytelling, Asian food and wellness traditions, Asian folklore and hungry ghost traditions, and concise writing inspired by principles of simplicity and clarity.

Common speaking themes include inspirational speaking, healthy eating and cooking, cultural storytelling, and writing programs. Her educational offerings include author visits and writer-in-residence programs, where she works with students and teachers to encourage reading, writing, creativity, and cross-cultural understanding.

== Publications ==
- Buddha Jumps Over a Wall and Other Curiously Named Chinese Dishes. Chronicle Books. Release date: March 2025.
- The Chinese New Year Helper. Rocky Pond Books. 2024. ISBN 9780593534014
- Growing Up Under a Red Flag. Rocky Pond Books. 2024. ISBN 978-0593533987.
- Ra Pu Zel and the Stinky Tofu. Rocky Pond Books. 2024. ISBN 978-0593533055.
- Dragon Noodle Party. Holiday House. 2022. ISBN 978-0823449507.
- Morning Sun in Wuhan. Clarion Books. 2022. ISBN 978-0358572053.
- Little Red Riding Hood and the Dragon. Abrams Books for Young Readers. 2022 ISBN 978-1419737282.
- D is for Dragon Dance (Chinese/English bilingual edition). Holiday House. 2018.
- Revolution Is Not a Dinner Party (German translation). Verlagshaus Jacoby & Stuart. 2018.
- The Chinese Emperor's New Clothes. Abrams Books For Young Readers. 2018. ISBN 978-1419725425.
- The Chinese Emperor's New Clothes (Audiobook Sample). Abrams Books For Young Readers. 2018.
- A Banquet for Hungry Ghosts: A collection of Deliciously Frightening Tales. Tumbling Dumpling Media. 2016. ISBN 978-0997218701.
- The Story of Chopsticks. Immedium. 2016. ISBN 9781597021203.
- The Story of Kites. Immedium. 2016. ISBN 978-1597021319.
- The Story of Paper. Immedium. 2016. ISBN 978-1597021234.
- Boy Dumplings: A Tasty Chinese Tale. Immedium. 2016. ISBN 978-1597021197.
- Secrets of The Terra Cotta Soldier. with Vinson Compestine. Abrams Books. 2014. ISBN 978-1419705403.
- Cooking with an Asian Accent. Houghton Mifflin Harcourt. 2014. ISBN 978-1118130759.
- Ying's Best One-Dish Meals: Quick & Healthy Recipes for the Entire Family. Sellers Publishing, Inc. 2011. ISBN 978-1416206439.
- The Runaway Wok. Dutton Books for Young Readers. 2011. ISBN 978-0525420682.
- Crouching Tiger. Candlewick. 2011. ISBN 978-0763646424.
- Revolution Is Not a Dinner Party. Henry Holt & Co. 2007. ISBN 978-0997218701.
- The Real Story of Stone Soup. Dutton Books for Young Readers. 2007. ISBN 978-0525474937.
- D is For Dragon Dance. Holiday House Inc. 2007. ISBN 9780823420582.
- The Story of Noodles. Holiday House. 2002. ISBN 0823416003.
- Secrets From a Healthy Asian Kitchen. Avery. 2002. ISBN 9781583331279.
- The Runaway Rice Cake. Simon & Schuster Books for Young Readers. 2001. ISBN 0689829728.
- Cooking With Green Tea. Avery. 2000. ISBN 9781583330654.
- Secrets of Fat-free Chinese Cooking. Avery. 1997. ISBN 0895297353.

== Awards ==
Book	Award
Revolution Is Not a Dinner Party	California Book Award for Young Adult Literature 2008 ALA Best Books For Young Adults 2008 ALA Notable Children's Books 2007 Publishers Weekly Best Children's Fiction Book List 2007 San Francisco Chronicle Best Children's Fiction Book List 2008 Chinese American Librarian Association Best Book 2007 New York Public Library 100 Best Titles for Reading and Sharing 2007 Fall Book Sense Children's Picks 2007 Parent's Choice Silver Honor 2007 Cybils Award Nomination for Young Adult Fiction 2008 Tayshas Reading List (Texas) 2007 Chicago Public Library Best of the Best 2007 Cleveland Public Library Celebrate With Books 2007 Cuyahoga County Public Library Great Books for Kids 2008 Notable Social Studies Trade Book for Young People — CBC and the National Council for Social Studies 2008 IRA Notable Books for a Global Society 2008 NCTE Award 2008 Capitol Choices — Best Books of the Year, Washington, D.C. 2008 New York Public Library's Teen Age List 2008 Cooperative Children's Book Center — Best of the Year 2008 Bank Street College of Education — Best Children's Book 2008 Notable Children's Book in the Language Arts 2008 Book of the Year Award — Northern California Independent Booksellers Association 2008 Women's National Book Association's Judy Lopez Memorial Awards Honor 2008-09 Maine Student Book Award 2008 Notable Children's Books in the English Language Arts 2009 ATPE Book of the Month 2009 Sakura Medal Book 2008-2009 Nominated for the Maine Student Book Award
A Banquet for Hungry Ghosts: A collection of Deliciously Frightening Tales	Notable Book for 2010 by the Children's Literary Assembly AARP as a Grandparent's Book for Children
Secrets of The Terra Cotta Soldier	Top 3 Books by The Morning Call Best Multi-Cultural Books of 2014 Award NYPL's 100 Best Children's Books of 2014 Best Fiction on the Bank Street College 2015 List The Nerdy Book Club's Top 10 Historical Fiction List Shortlisted for the Hong Kong Golden Dragon Book Award CALA Best Book Award of 2014
Crouching Tiger	Winner of the Panda Book Award in China Winner of The Morning Calm Award in South Korea The Chinese American Librarians Association Best Book of 2011 CCBC Choices for 2012
The Runaway Wok: A Chinese New Year Tale	Featured title at the Asian Festival of Children's Content in Singapore 2013 Washington Children's Choice Picture Book Award (WCCPBA)Nominee 2012 Storytelling World Resource Award 2012 California Collections List, for school libraries Scholastic Book Club Choice 2011 Lasting Connections Top 30 Titles from Booklist
The Chinese Emperor's New Clothes	2018 Parent's Choice Awards 2019 Great Texas Mosquito List 2019 Bank Street College of Education — Best Children's Book
Morning Sun in Wuhan	2022 Selected as one of the best books of 2022 by the New York Public Library 2022 Honorable Mention of the Freeman Book Award by NCTAsia 2022 Recipient of the Common Sense Selection for Books designation 2023 Chosen as a Gold Standard Selection by the Junior Library Guild 2023 Notable Social Studies Book by the NSST/CBC
Ra Pu Zel and the Stinky Tofu	2024 Recipient of the Common Sense Selection for Books designation 2024 Winner of the MOSS Kids National Championship 2024 BookPage's Best Picture Books of the Year 2024 Evanston Public Library 101 Great Books for Kids 2024 New York Public Library Best Books for Kids
Growing Up Under a Red Flag	2024 Chosen as a Gold Standard Selection by the Junior Library Guild 2024 Recipient of the Common Sense Selection for Books designation 2024 Starred review from the School Library Journal 2024 Starred review from Publishers Weekly 2024 Starred review from Booklist 2024 CALIBA Golden Poppy Award Finalist 2024 Kirkus Reviews' Best Picture Books of the Year Wall Street Journal's Best Books of 2024: Children's Books Booklist's Editors' Choice: Books for Youth, 2024 Common Sense Selection's Best Books of the Year: 2024 2025 Comstock Read Aloud Book Award
The Chinese New Year Helper	2024 Publishers Weekly's Best Holiday Books For Kids and Teens Book Riot's Best New Children's Books Out December 2024
Buddha Jumps over the Wall, and Other Curiously Named Classic Chinese Dishes	2025 Google Play's Best Books(Graphic Novel)
