= Stone Soupercomputer =

The Stone Soupercomputer was a Beowulf-style computer cluster built at the US Oak Ridge National Laboratory in the late 1990s.

A group of lab employees including William W. Hargrove and Forrest M. Hoffman applied for a grant to build a cluster in 1996, but it was rejected. They decided to build a cluster anyway, using desktop personal computers that had been discarded as being too slow. The name was derived from the story of stone soup.. The developers used freely available and open source software such as Linux operating system, the Parallel Virtual Machine toolkit, and the Message Passing Interface library.

By early 1997, the first applications were running on the cluster. By May 2001, it had 133 nodes. They included Intel 80486 and Pentium-based machines as well as a few DEC Alpha workstations. Low-cost Ethernet networking was used for interconnection instead of any special-purpose network. The cluster was the subject of an article in Scientific American magazine in 2001. The stone cluster was no longer in use by August 2003.. This approach was used as a model for other educational cluster projects.
