= Stone Soup: An Old Tale =

1949 Caldecott picture book

- Author: Marcia Brown
- Illustrator: Marcia Brown
- Genre: Children's picture book
- Publisher: Scribner Press
- Publication date: 1947
- Publication place: United States

Stone Soup: An Old Tale is a 1947 picture book written and illustrated by Marcia Brown and published by Charles Scribner's Sons. It is a retelling of the Stone Soup folk tale. Three soldiers make a soup using water and stones. Each villager contributes an ingredient to the soup, creating a feast. The book was a recipient of a 1948 Caldecott Honor for its illustrations.

== Adaptations ==
Weston Woods produced a cartoon of this book in 1992, narrated by Rex Robbins.
