= Stone Soup Coffeehouse =

Coffeehouse in Rhode Island

Coordinates: 41.877436°N 71.382427°W

The Stone Soup Coffeehouse is a coffeehouse based in Rhode Island. It is one of the oldest folk music venues in Southern New England. After many years in Pawtucket, Stone Soup returns to Providence September 2019. Shows will be at the Music Mansion on 88 Meeting Street.

Founded in 1980, it has presented concerts by artists such as Catie Curtis, Pete Seeger, Patty Larkin, Ellis Paul, The Low Anthem, Northern Lights, Holly Near, and Marshall Crenshaw. And continues to present a mix of national and local artists.

In 2003, it had to ask for donations for the first time; prior to that, they had been able to support themselves on admission fees.

The name “Stone Soup” was taken from the folk tale about building community. In the story a beggar coming in to town is initially rebuffed by the townspeople. He offers to make his special “stone” soup and invites all to partake, eventually winning over the town and their communal contributions to make a truly magical soup. The magic is the building of a community, which is what we do at Stone Soup. At Stone Soup, artists, volunteers and audiences bring something special to a performance and the result is truly magical. Most shows start at 7pm. Doors open 1/2 hour before the concert. All seating is on a first-come, first-served basis. As always, our goodies will be included in the price of the tickets. Donations, however, are graciously accepted and passed along to a sponsored charity.
