= Stone Soup (magazine) =

Literary magazine for children

- Editor: Emma Wood
- Categories: Literary magazine Juvenilia
- Frequency: monthly
- Founded: 1973
- First issue: May 1973
- Country: USA
- Based in: Santa Cruz, California
- Language: English
- Website: www.stonesoup.com

Stone Soup is a literary magazine for children that publishes writing and art created by children from all over the world. The magazine was founded in 1972 by college students at Porter College at the University of California, Santa Cruz, and the first issue of the magazine was published in May 1973. Their purpose was to "encourage youngsters to use writing as a way to talk about their lives". The founder, William Rubel, continues to run the publication today along with Editor Emma Wood and other colleagues from their offices in Santa Cruz, California. Booklist described Stone Soup's editorial philosophy as, "Children can meet the highest standard of literature and art."

== Description ==
Many of Stone Soup's contributors and readership live in the US or Canada, however writers come from over 40 different countries, according to the editors. In 2017, the magazine ceased bimonthly print publication and began publishing online 11 times a year (monthly except for a combined July/August issue), as well as a print Annual, which collects all the writing from the year, including particularly notable blog posts, into one book. Each issue of the Stone Soup contains stories, poems, and art by primarily eight to 13-year-old contributors. Photos of the authors and illustrators accompany their work. The Children's Art Foundation, a 501(c)3 non-profit organization, publishes the magazine.

Children's written stories and poems can be either fiction or non-fiction, and former editor Gerry Mandel told The Washington Times that she searches out work "from the heart" that "combines both beautiful writing and original ideas". Writing by children is more generally referred to as "juvenilia".

Published authors include an 11-year-old girl who wrote about her family coming together after her mother's death from breast cancer; a 10-year-old girl whose family survived a hurricane; a 13-year-old boy who remembered how his childhood fort was destroyed by a bulldozer and new construction; and an 11-year-old boy who created an original fiction piece about a boy waking up to find his family has turned into pigs.

In 1989, Stone Soup’s editors published an issue focusing solely on the art, stories, and photographs created by Navajo children growing up on an Indian reservation. "We publish work by kids who, like adult writers, ... have things to say." Mandel said to Curriculum Administrator.
