= Milford Mills, Pennsylvania =

Unincorporated community in Pennsylvania, US

- Village
- Montrose School House on Covered Bridge Road, now under the water of Marsh Creek Lake

- Location of Milford Mills in Pennsylvania Milford Mills, Pennsylvania (the United States)
- Coordinates: 40°03′54″N 75°43′42″W
- Country: United States
- State: Pennsylvania
- County: Chester
- Elevation: 272 ft (83 m)

Population (2000)
  - Total: 0
- Time zone: UTC-5 (EST)
  - Summer (DST): UTC-4 (EDT)
- ZIP Code: 19335
- Area codes: 484 and 610

Milford Mills was a village that was located in the Marsh Creek Valley of Chester County, Pennsylvania, United States. It was inundated by the construction of the Marsh Creek Dam in 1972.

== History ==
Milford Mills was one of several farming villages that were settled in Upper Uwchlan Township by Welsh, Scots-Irish and English during the first quarter of the eighteenth century. Like nearby Lyndell and Dorlan, Milford Mills grew during the nineteenth century as paper and textile manufacturing flourished. Later bypassed by large-scale industry, the region reverted to an agricultural economy until after World War II when the Pennsylvania Turnpike brought suburban development to northwestern Chester County.

In 1961, the Pennsylvania Department of Forests and Waters selected the Marsh Creek Valley as favorable location for a flood control and drinking water reservoir to serve the Brandywine River Valley. Despite protests from some residents, the Commonwealth of Pennsylvania acquired thirty-four properties throughout the region for the project, razing the village and nearby woodlands. In 1972, the earthen Marsh Creek Dam was completed, standing at 89 feet (27 m) high and 990 feet (301 m) long.

Today, the site of Milford Mills lies beneath the 530-acre (2.1 km^{2}) Marsh Creek Lake, and is part of a water management project operated by the Chester County Water Resources Authority and the Commonwealth of Pennsylvania.

Abandoned roads and traces of houses, barns and other structures can be seen on the shores of the lake and in adjacent recreation areas in Marsh Creek State Park.

== Gallery ==
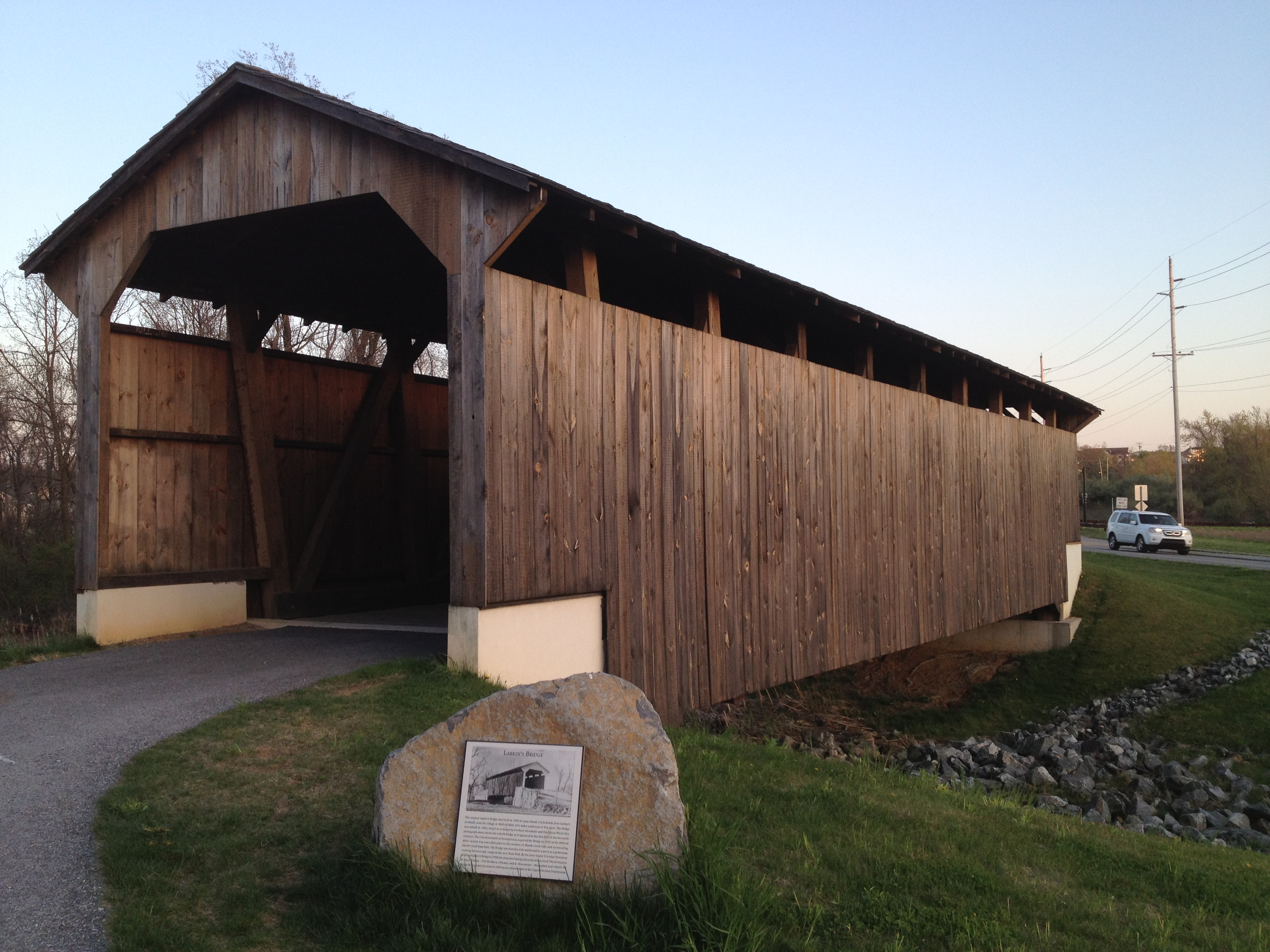
The Larkin Covered Bridge was once located in Milford Mills.

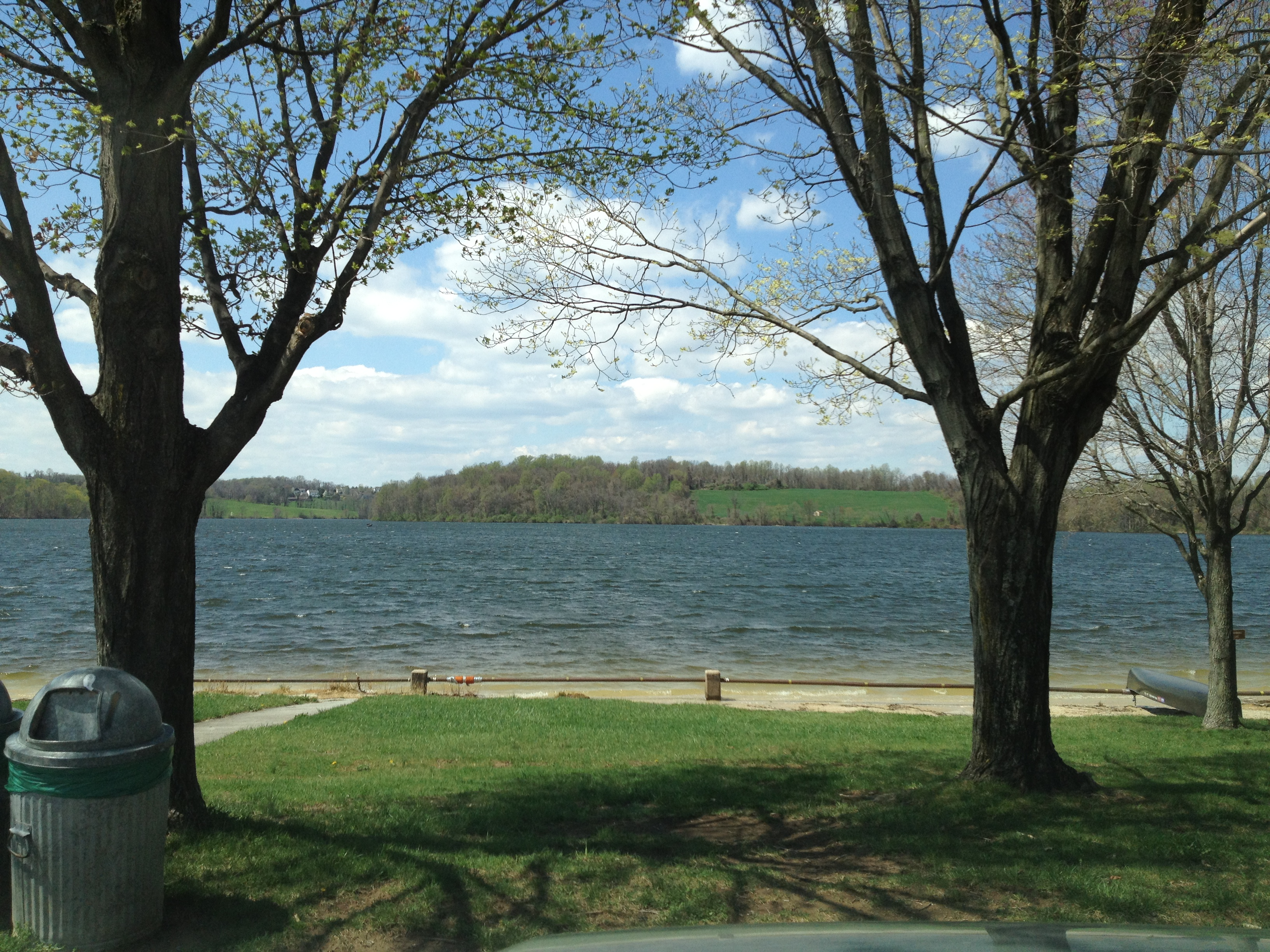
Milford Mills is currently under Marsh Creek Lake.

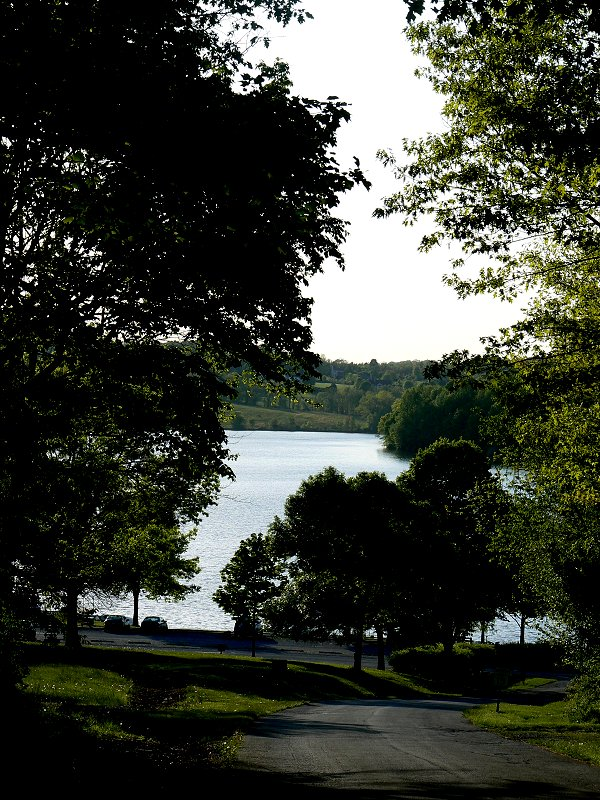
Marsh Creek Lake where Marsh Creek Valley and Milford Mills once stood

Larkin's Covered Bridge at its original location on Covered Bridge Road

Map of Milford Mills from an 1883 Atlas

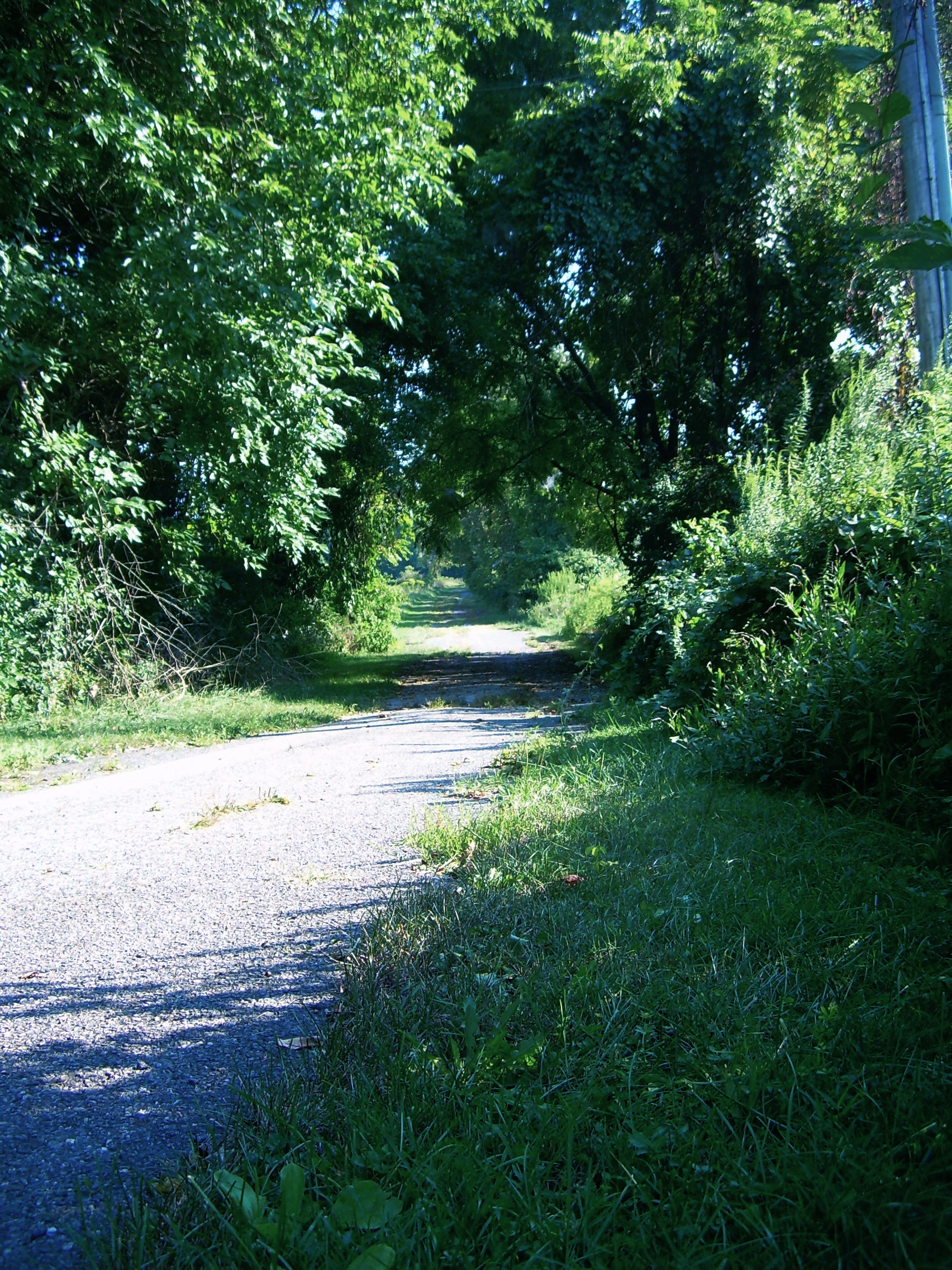
A portion of Milford Road abandoned following the construction of the Marsh Creek dam.

== See also ==
- List of ghost towns in Pennsylvania
