= Struble Trail =

Rail trail in southeast Pennsylvania

Coordinates: 40.031708°N 75.707304°W

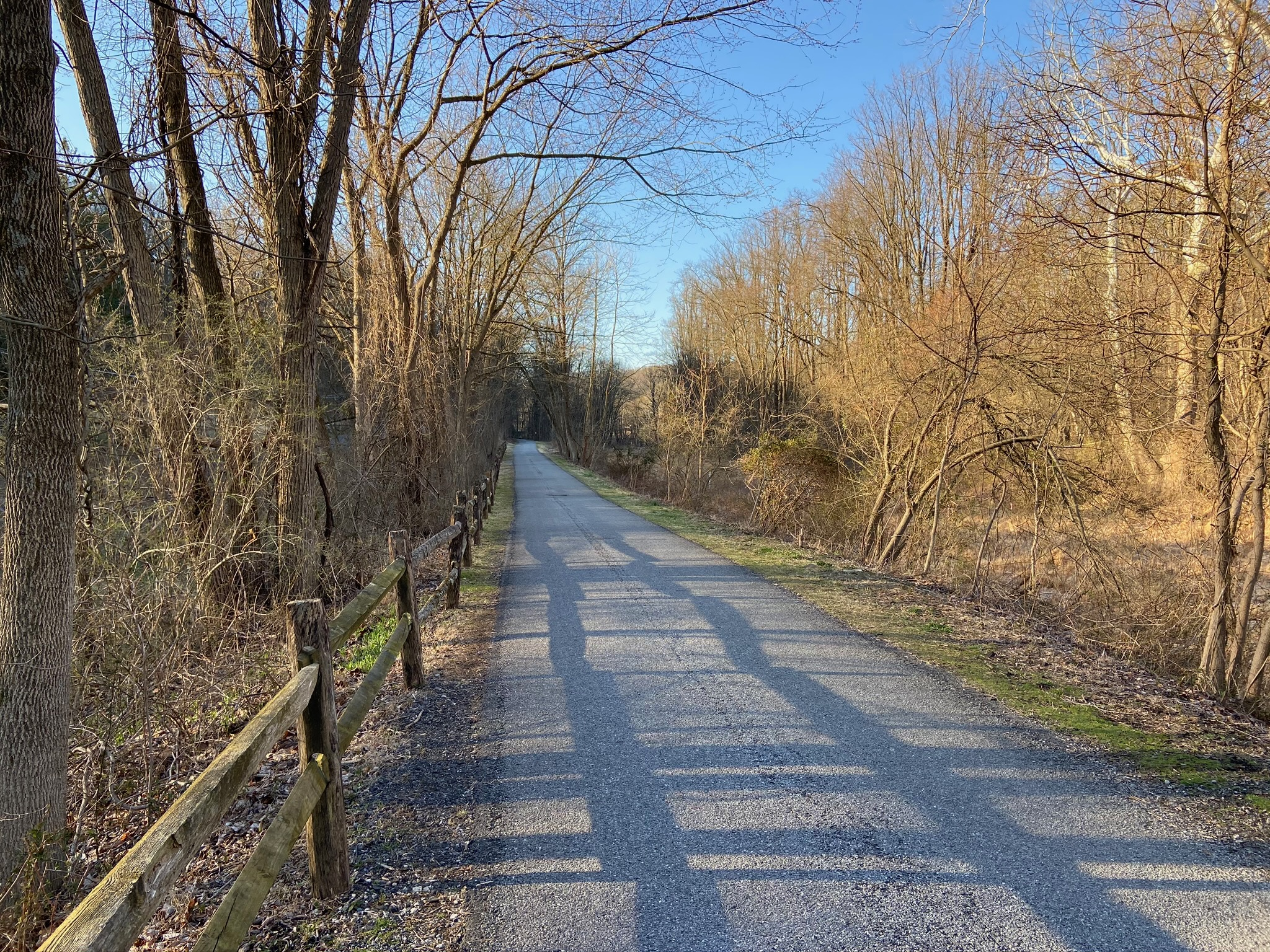
- Length: 3 mi (4.8 km)
- Location: Chester County, Pennsylvania, United States
- Trailheads: Downingtown, Pennsylvania and Dorlan, Pennsylvania
- Use: Hiking, Biking
- Difficulty: Good for all skill levels
- Season: Year Round

Struble Trail is a multi-use rail trail located in Chester County, Pennsylvania. It is also known as the R.G. Struble Hike-Bike Trail.

== Background ==
It has 3 miles (4.8 km) currently open and 15.53 miles (24.99 km) of proposed trails. The majority of the trail is a paved surface. The trail is open for walking, running, biking, skateboarding, and roller skating. It is often used for dog walking. Use of motor vehicles and horses on the trail is prohibited. The trail is closed between dusk and dawn.

The Struble Trail was named for the late Chester County Commissioner (1976–1980) and longtime executive director of the Brandywine Valley Association, teacher and conservationist Robert G. Struble.

The trail head is located on Dorlan Mill Road, just north of the Downingtown Borough on Pennsylvania Route 282. For most of its distance, the trail follows the East Branch of the Brandywine Creek.

The Struble Trail is maintained by the Chester County Facilities and Parks Department. In August 2008, 23 acres (9.3 ha) of land was purchased from the owners of the defunct Shryock Paper Mill property after a highly publicized grassroots effort to preserve the property. Safe, continuous passage from the Struble Trail to the approximately 6 miles (9.7 km) of hiking trails within Marsh Creek State Park is now possible.

Along the trail there are several historical sites, fishing spots, and picnic areas. Notable among the historical sites is the Dowlin Forge, also known as the Mary Ann Forge, which is the oldest industrial site in Uwchlan Township, Pennsylvania.

The Struble Trail was closed for several weeks in September 2021 as a result of damage to the trail from Hurricane Ida and the flooding of the trail from the Brandywine Creek.
