= West Vincent Highlands Historic District =

Historic district in Pennsylvania, United States

- U.S. National Register of Historic Places
- U.S. Historic district
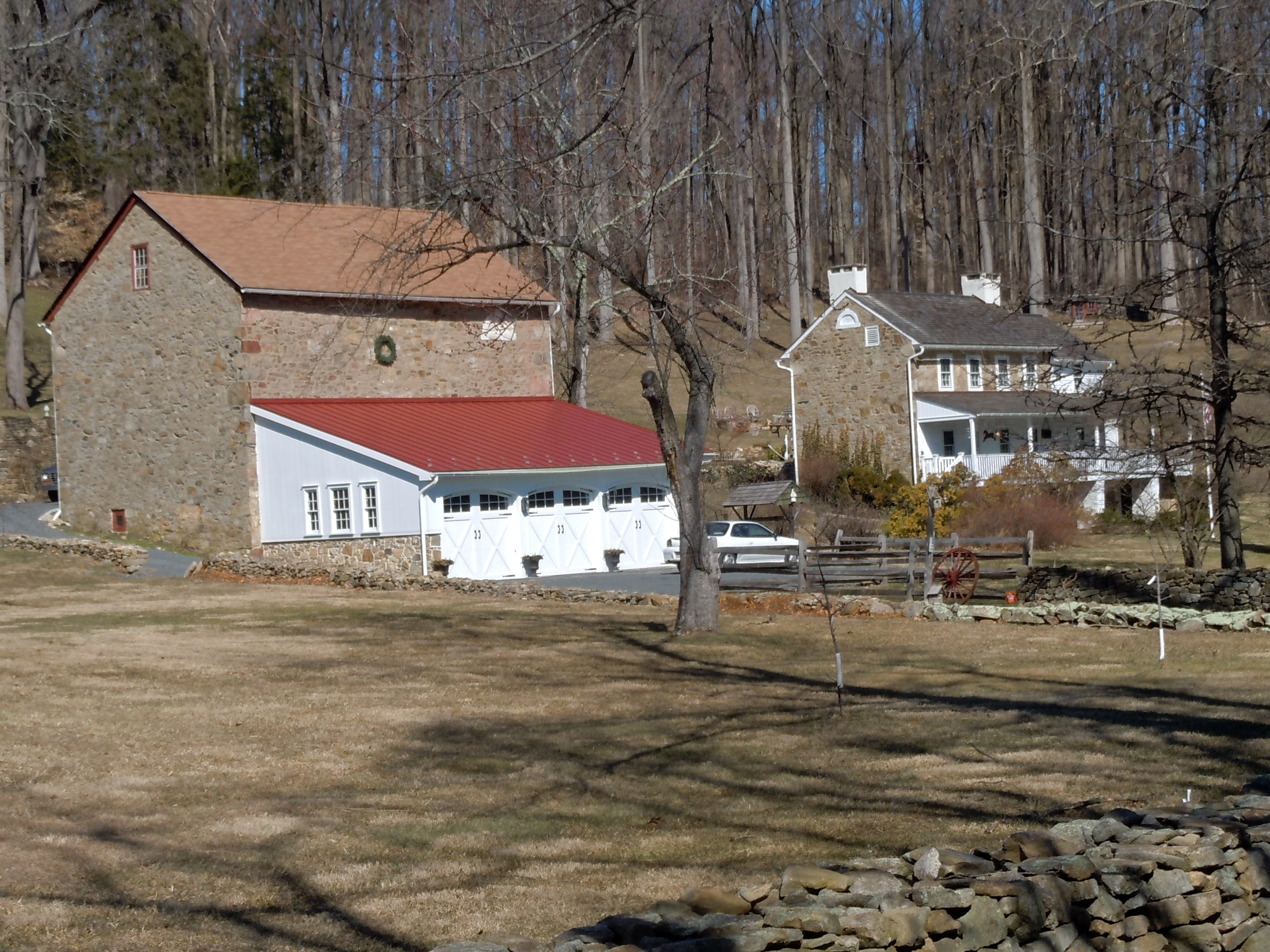
- Barn and House in the West Vincent Highlands Historic District, March 2011

- Location within Pennsylvania Location within the United States
- Location: Birchrun Road, Pennsylvania Route 401, Fellowship Road, Horshoe Tr., Hollow Road, and Davis, Jaine, Green, Bartlett, and Mill Lns., Upper Uwchlan Township and West Vincent Township, Pennsylvania
- Coordinates: 40°07′37″N 75°40′17″W
- Area: 1,986.4 acres (803.9 ha)
- NRHP reference No.: 98000400
- Added to NRHP: May 7, 1998

West Vincent Highlands Historic District is a national historic district located in Upper Uwchlan Township and West Vincent Township, Chester County, Pennsylvania.

It was added to the National Register of Historic Places in 1998.

== History ==
The district includes 147 contributing buildings, seven contributing sites, and six contributing structures in a rural area of Chester County. It includes a variety of early- to mid-19th century vernacular farmhouses and related outbuildings. Other buildings include a stone grist mill (1808) and woolen mill (1813).
