= Wheelen House =

Historic house in Pennsylvania, United States

- U.S. National Register of Historic Places
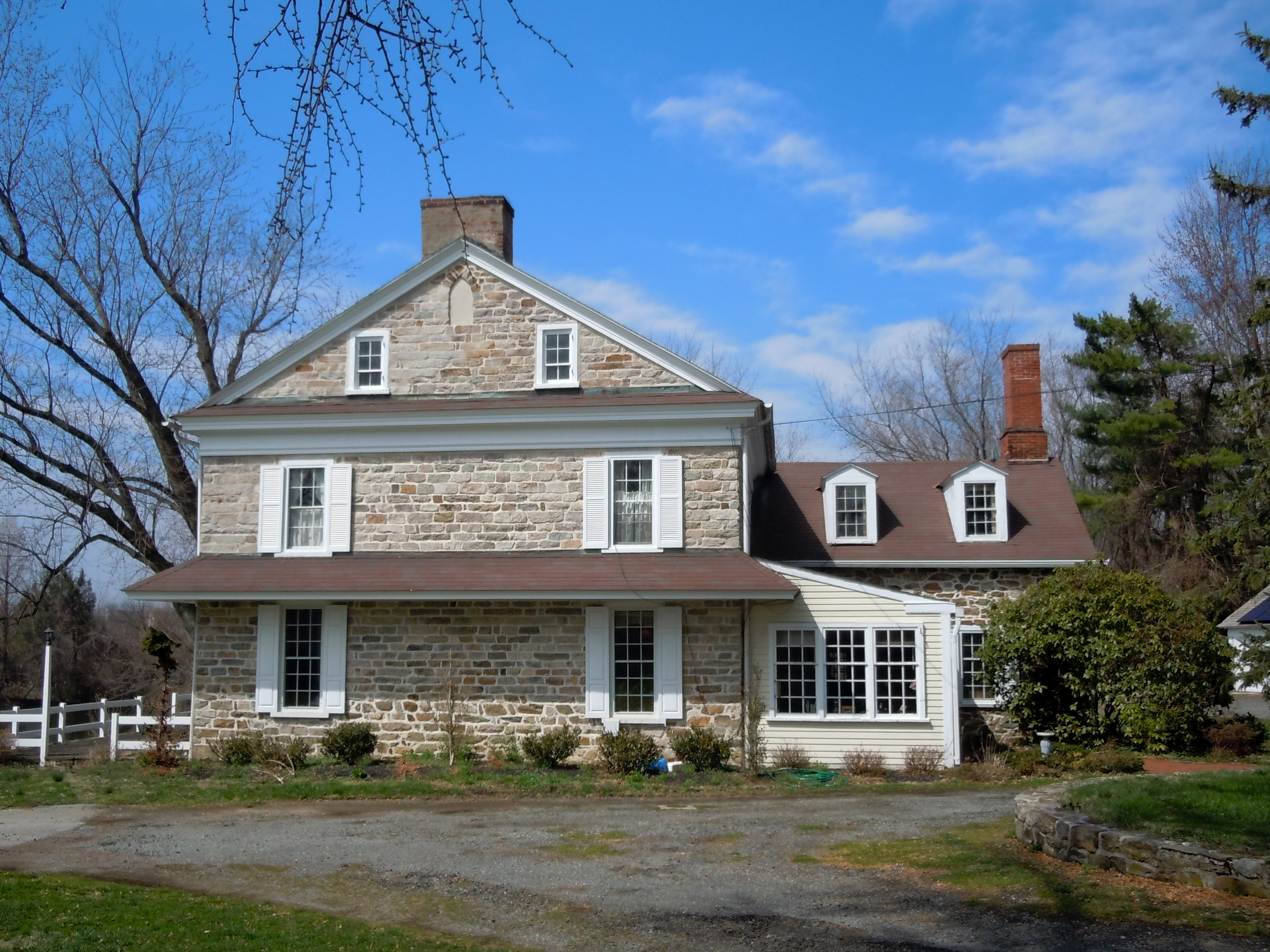
- Wheelen House, April 2011

- Location within Pennsylvania Location within the United States
- Location: Northeast of Downingtown on Fellowship Road, Upper Uwchlan Township, Pennsylvania
- Coordinates: 40°6′21″N 75°40′35″W
- Area: 2 acres (0.81 ha)
- Built: c. 1750
- Architectural style: Georgian
- NRHP reference No.: 74001768
- Added to NRHP: June 20, 1974

Wheelen House, also known as Fellowship Farm, is a historic home located in Upper Uwchlan Township, Chester County, Pennsylvania, United States. It was built about 1750, and is a 2 1/2-story, random and coursed fieldstone structure in the Georgian style. It has a gable roof, end chimneys, and a 1 1/2-story kitchen wing. The house was restored in the late 1940s to early 1950s.

It was listed on the National Register of Historic Places in 1974.
