= Beth Israel Congregation of Chester County =

Synagogue in North America

Beth Israel
- Location in Pennsylvania

Religion
- Affiliation: Conservative Judaism
- Ecclesiastical or organisational status: Synagogue
- Leadership: Rabbi Jon Cutler
- Status: Active

Location
- Location: 385 Pottstown Pike, (Route 100), Upper Uwchlan Township, Chester County, Pennsylvania
- Country: United States
- Administration: United Synagogue of Conservative Judaism
- Coordinates: 40°05′01″N 75°41′26″W

Architecture
- Architect: Callori Architects
- Type: Synagogue
- Established: 1904 (Coatesville congregation)
- Groundbreaking: 1994
- Completed: 1924 (in Coatesville); 1995 (in Upper Uwchlan)

Website
- bethisraelpa.org

Beth Israel Congregation is a Modern Conservative synagogue located at 385 Pottstown Pike (Route 100) in Upper Uwchlan Township, Chester County, Pennsylvania, in the United States. The congregation was founded in Coatesville in 1904 as Kesher Israel by Eastern European immigrants, and formally chartered as "Beth Israel" in 1916. It constructed its first building in 1923, and expanded it after World War II.

Linda Joy Holtzman was appointed rabbi in 1979, the first female rabbi appointed to lead a Conservative congregation in the United States. Holtzman served until 1985, and was succeeded by Michael Charney. The congregation purchased its current property in 1989, and completed its facility there in 1995. Charney was succeeded in 2015 by Jon Cutler.

== Early history ==
Beth Israel was founded in 1904 as Kesher Israel by Jewish immigrants to Coatesville, Pennsylvania from Eastern Europe. It established a Sunday school and purchased a cemetery in 1907, and was formally chartered as "Beth Israel" by the Chester County Court of Common Pleas in 1916.

The congregation purchased land on Fifth Avenue and Harmony Street in Coatesville in 1923, and constructed a new synagogue building there, completed in 1924. After World War II, an extension to the building added a chapel/library and classrooms, and expanded the kitchen and social hall.

Elihu Schagrin was rabbi from 1945 to 1953. Born in Wilmington, Delaware in 1918, he was ordained at the Reform Jewish Institute of Religion in 1946. During his tenure at Beth Israel he also served as chaplain of Coatesville's Veterans Hospital, and, from 1949 on, was president of the Greater Coatesville Inter-Racial Committee. In 1953 he moved to Temple Concord of Binghamton, New York.

== Linda Holtzman ==
In 1979, the congregation (which now numbered 110 families) hired Linda Joy Holtzman as rabbi. She had been ordained that year by the Reconstructionist Rabbinical College, and was one of thirty applicants. She became the second woman in the United States to serve as the presiding or senior rabbi of a synagogue, following Michal Bernstein. She was the first woman to serve as a rabbi for a Conservative congregation, as the Conservative movement did not then ordain women. The Reform and Reconstructionist movements had previously ordained at least ten women rabbis, but (aside from Bernstein) they all served as assistant rabbis, hospital chaplains, or directors of university campus Hillel organizations. The New York Times described her hiring as "a marked breakthrough for the growing numbers of women who have faced obstacles in becoming a rabbi-in-charge", and quoted Holtzman as saying "the fact that I have an appointment in a small town and that they have entrusted me with functions they believe are important is very significant for women and for the Jewish community". At the time, there were only 22 female rabbis in the entire world.

Beth Israel hired the Reconstructionist-ordained Holtzman despite the fact that it was a Conservative synagogue. The executive vice president of the Conservative Rabbinical Assembly, Rabbi Wolfe Kelman, described the appointment as "an historical breakthrough and simply fantastic", and felt that other synagogues would be encouraged to follow suit. At the time, the Rabbinical Assembly did not accept women as members, and the Conservative movement did not ordain its first woman rabbi—Amy Eilberg—until 1985. The hiring of a non-Conservative rabbi in itself was not unusual, however; due in part to a shortage of Conservative rabbis, a fifth of all Conservative synagogues in the U.S. had non-Conservative rabbis in place. While Holtzman believed in the tenets of the Reconstructionist movement, she said that members of the congregation could choose to follow either traditional or nontraditional ideas.

Beth Israel's membership was 125 families by 1983, and the synagogue building also housed B'nai B'rith and Hadassah chapters. Holtzman served at Beth Israel until 1985, when her contract was up for renegotiation. She had been living in Philadelphia and commuting to Coatesville for several years; although she and her lesbian partner had had an open commitment ceremony in Philadelphia, she had not yet come out to her congregation (but despite living something of a double life, she had enjoyed her time with the synagogue and found it very rewarding). Now she informed Beth Israel's board of directors that she and her partner were planning to have children and that she wanted co-parenting leave, and by her subsequent account, each board member privately indicated they were okay with this but that the other board members were not ready for such a development. She left the synagogue and later that year became spiritual leader of Beth Ahavah, an LGBT congregation in Center City, Philadelphia.

== Events since 1985 ==
Holtzman was succeeded as rabbi in 1985 by Michael Charney. The son and grandson of rabbis, he was ordained at the Reform Hebrew Union College-Jewish Institute of Religion in Cincinnati, and served congregations in Clearwater, Florida and Bowie, Maryland before coming to Beth Israel. While serving at Beth Israel, he also work as a chaplain at Norristown State Hospital, and taught Hebrew at Arcadia University. Charney retired in 2015, though continued to instruct Bar and bat mitzvah candidates, and died in 2019.

The congregation purchased its current property at 385 Pottstown Pike (Route 100) in Upper Uwchlan Township in 1989. Construction on a new synagogue building there began in 1994 and completed in 1995. Designed by Callori Architects, the 30,000-square-foot (2,800 m^{2}) facility houses a sanctuary, chapel/library, and school wing. Behind the school wing is a Holocaust memorial garden.

Jon Cutler became the rabbi of Beth Israel in 2015. A native of Philadelphia, he graduated from Temple University in with a Masters of Arts in Religious Studies, and was ordained by the Reconstructionist Rabbinical College. He then earned his Doctor of Ministry (Counseling) from Hebrew Union College-Jewish Institute of Religion. He previously served in congregations in Flemington, New Jersey and Warrington, Pennsylvania. Cutler also had a long career as a chaplain for the U.S. Navy and Marines, retiring as a Naval Reserve captain on April 30, 2017, 32 years to the day after his original commission.

Beth Israel Congregation of Chester County holds services Friday evenings, Shabbat mornings, and on Jewish holidays.

== See also ==
- History of the Jews in Pennsylvania
