= Dorlan, Pennsylvania =

Unincorporated community in Pennsylvania, US

- Populated place
- Location of Dorlan in Pennsylvania Dorlan, Pennsylvania (the United States)
- Coordinates: 40°2′51″N 75°42′59″W
- Country: United States
- State: Pennsylvania
- County: Chester
- Township: East Brandywine
- Elevation: 285 ft (87 m)
- Time zone: UTC-5 (EST)
  - Summer (DST): UTC-4 (EDT)
- ZIP Code: 19335
- Area codes: 484 and 610

Dorlan is a populated place in Chester County, Pennsylvania, United States. It is located along Pennsylvania Route 282, north of Downingtown and just south of Marsh Creek State Park. The place is referenced as an end point for the Struble Trail at Dorlan Mill Road.
