= Lyndell, Pennsylvania =

Unincorporated community in Pennsylvania, US

- populated place
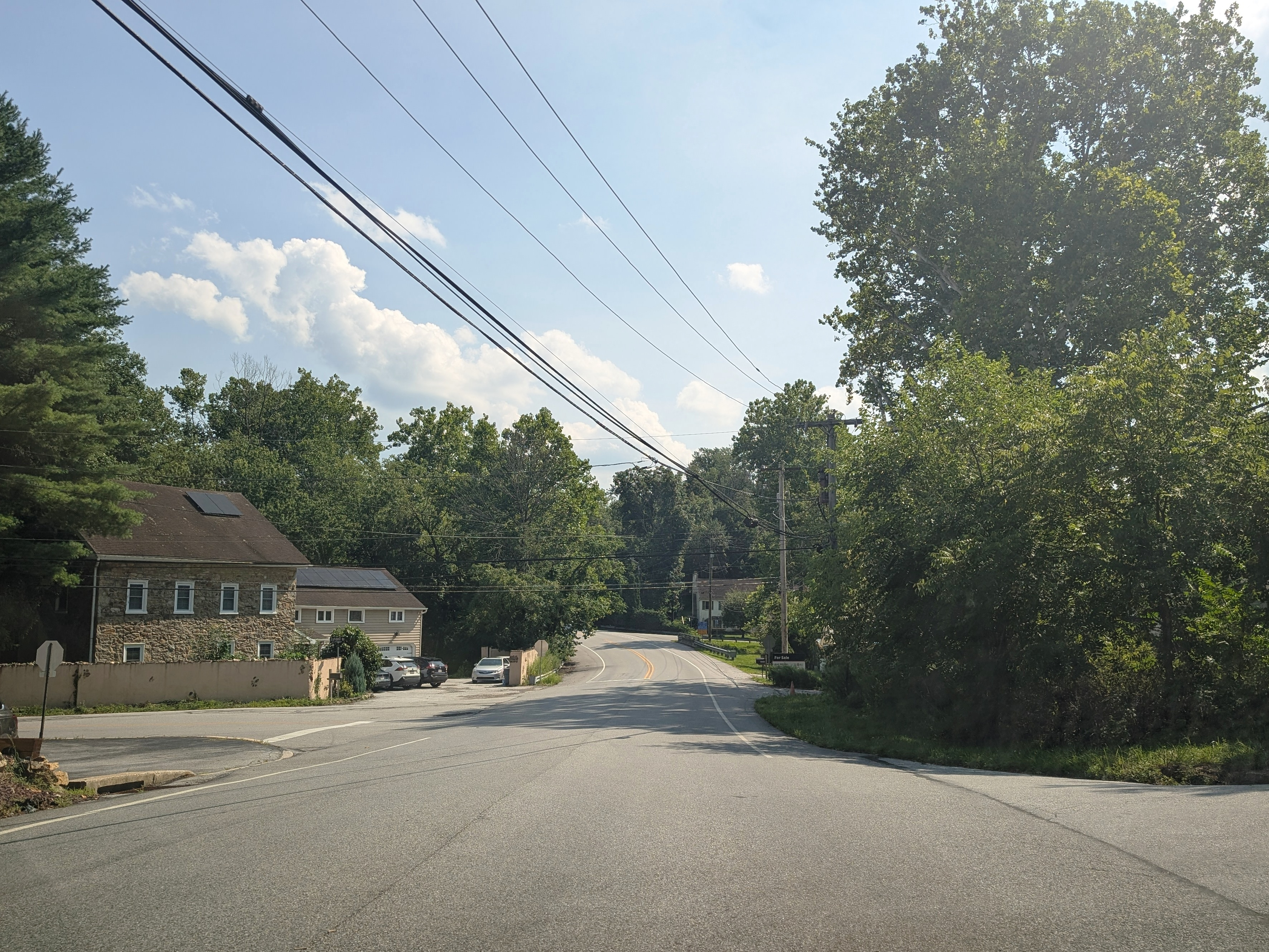
- Eastbound PA 282 in Lyndell

- Location of Lyndell in Pennsylvania Lyndell, Pennsylvania (the United States)
- Coordinates: 40°3′34″N 75°44′41″W
- Country: United States
- State: Pennsylvania
- County: Chester
- Elevation: 338 ft (103 m)
- Time zone: UTC-5 (EST)
  - Summer (DST): UTC-4 (EDT)
- ZIP Code: 19354
- Area codes: 484 and 610

Lyndell is a populated place in Chester County, Pennsylvania, United States, along Pennsylvania Route 282, north of Downingtown and just south of Marsh Creek State Park. The location is referenced for its zip code 19354.

Lyndell is known for being the location of the Brandywine Creek Campground (formerly Frank's Folly), so named in honor of Frank P. Sinex.

Lyndell was also home to singer Jim Croce and his wife Ingrid Jacobsen-Croce for two years before his death in a plane crash.
