= Upper Uwchlan Township, Pennsylvania =

Township in Pennsylvania, US

Upper Uwchlan Township
- Township
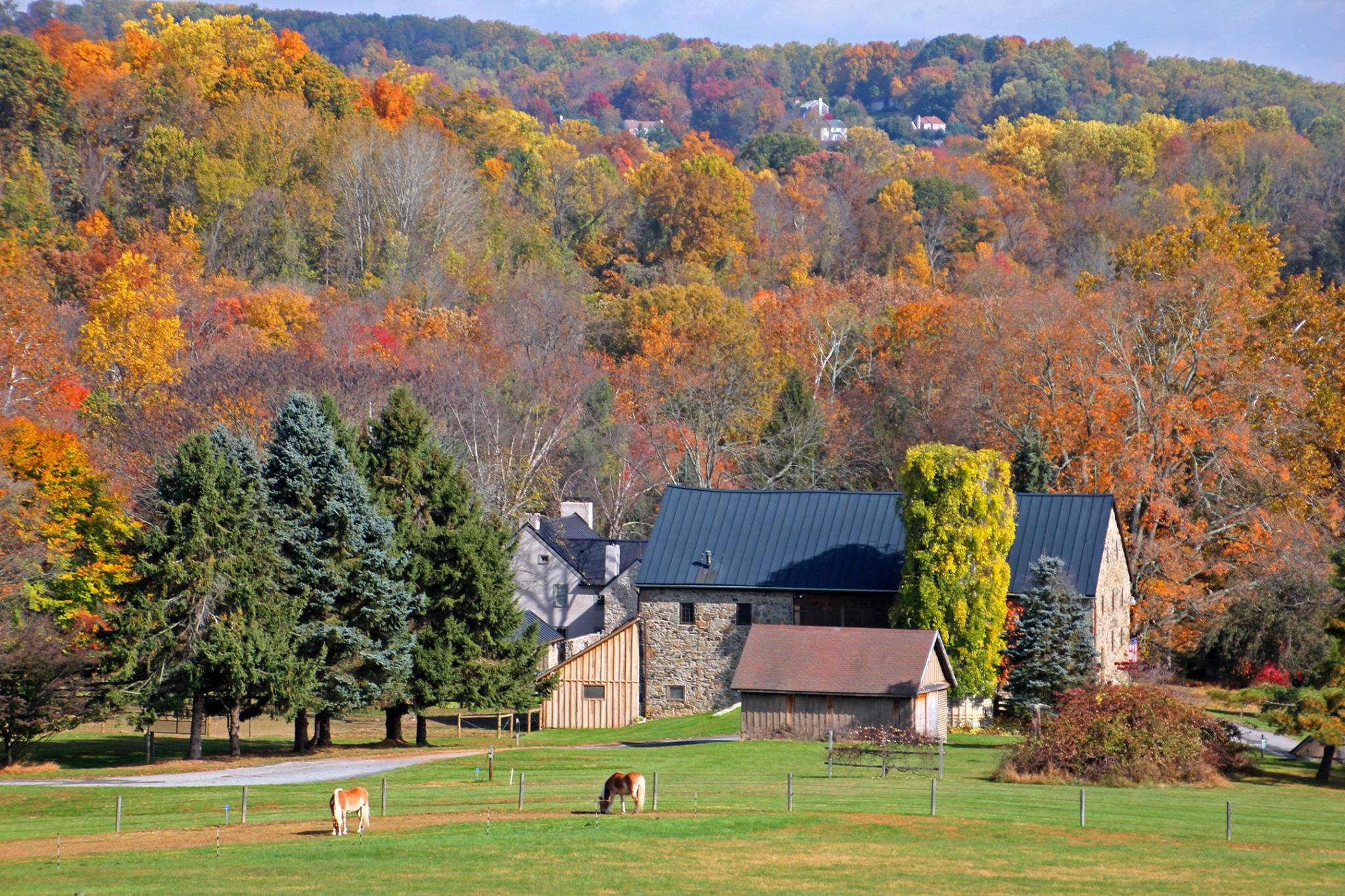
- Upper Uwchlan Township in October 2015

- Location of Upper Uwchlan Township in Chester County, Pennsylvania (top) and of Chester County in Pennsylvania (below)

- Location of Pennsylvania in the United States
- Coordinates: 40°05′18″N 75°41′58″W
- Country: United States
- State: Pennsylvania
- County: Chester

Area
  - Total: 11.72 sq mi (30.36 km^{2})
  - Land: 10.89 sq mi (28.21 km^{2})
  - Water: 0.83 sq mi (2.15 km^{2})
- Elevation: 469 ft (143 m)

Population (2010)
  - Total: 11,227
  - Estimate (2016): 11,500
  - Density: 1,056/sq mi (407.6/km^{2})
- Time zone: UTC-5 (EST)
  - Summer (DST): UTC-4 (EDT)
- ZIP Code: 19480
- Area codes: 484, 610, 835
- FIPS code: 42-029-79352
- Website: www.upperuwchlan-pa.gov

Upper Uwchlan Township (/ˈjuːklən/; [ˈɪuxlan]) is a township in Chester County, Pennsylvania, United States. The population was 11,227 at the 2010 census. The township included the community of Milford Mills before it was inundated by the creation of the Marsh Creek Dam in 1972.

The main population center of the township has grown surrounding the historic Eagle Tavern at the intersection of Route 100 and Little Conestoga Road. This major unincorporated community is known as the village of Eagle, but also sometimes known as Uwchlan. That is the address of the local post office.

== History ==
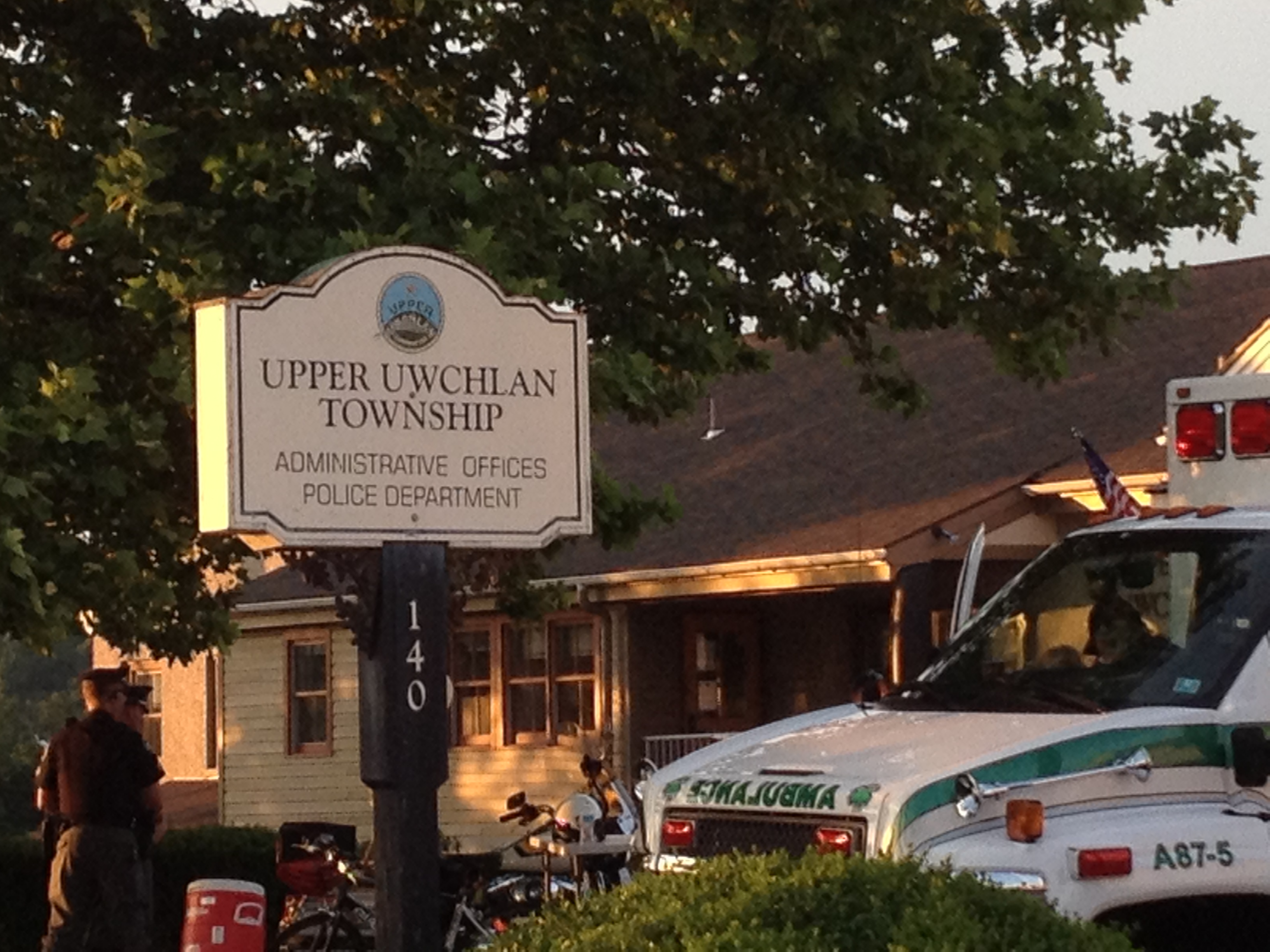
Upper Uwchlan Township offices in Eagle

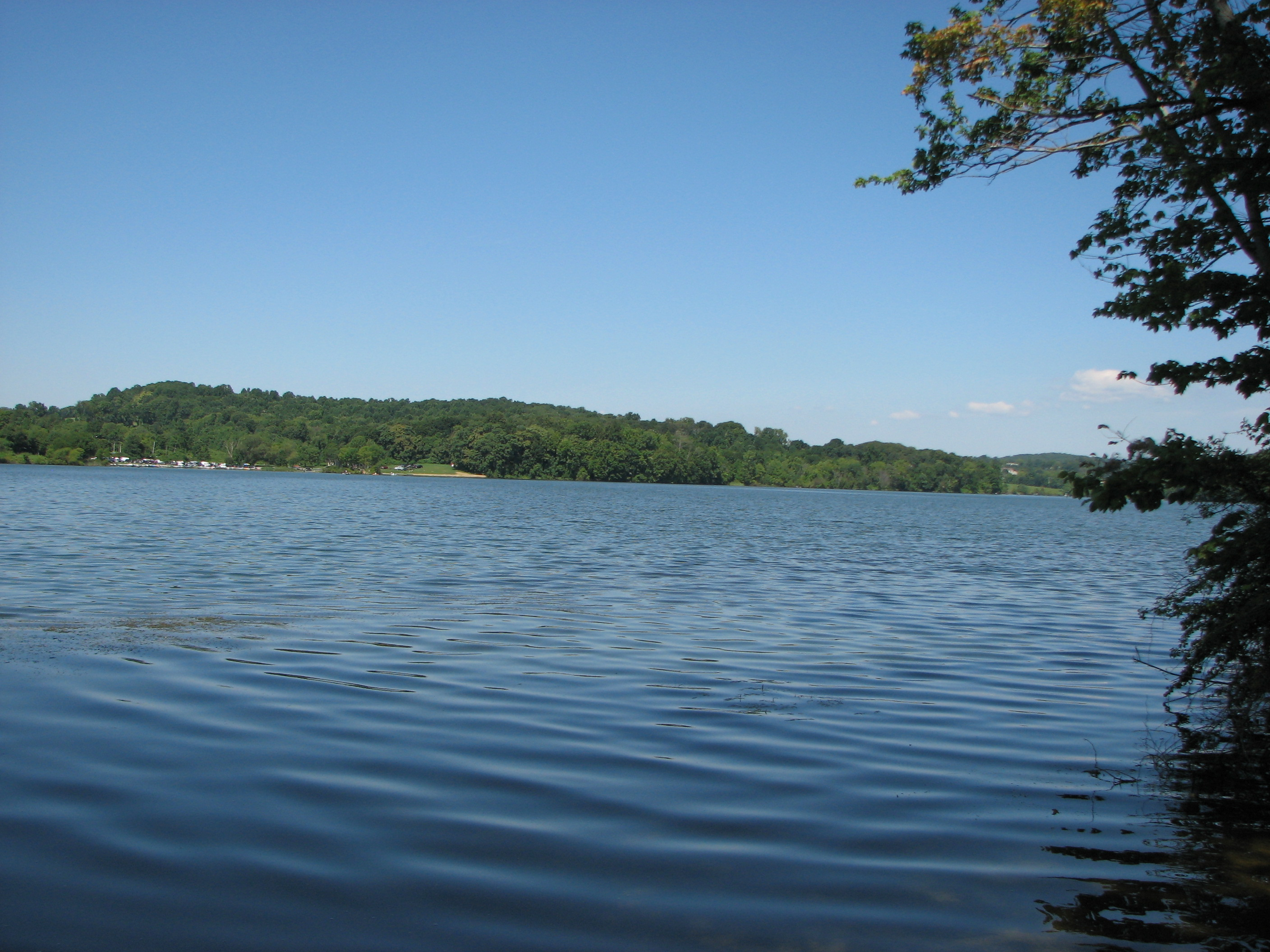
Marsh Creek Lake

The Byers Station Historic District, West Vincent Highlands Historic District, Larkin Covered Bridge, and Wheelen House are listed on the National Register of Historic Places.

== Geography ==
According to the U.S. Census Bureau, the township has a total area of 11.6 square miles (30 km^{2}), of which 10.8 square miles (28 km^{2}) is land and 0.9 square miles (2.3 km^{2}), or 7.33%, is water.

== Demographics ==
Historical population
Census	Pop.	Note	%±
1930	597		—
1940	689		15.4%
1950	761		10.4%
1960	909		19.4%
1970	996		9.6%
1980	1,805		81.2%
1990	4,396		143.5%
2000	6,850		55.8%
2010	11,227		63.9%
2020	12,275		9.3%

At the 2010 census, the township was 80.8% non-Hispanic White, 1.4% Black or African American, 14.1% Asian, and 1.3% were two or more races. 2.4% of the population were of Hispanic or Latino ancestry.

In the township, the population was spread out, with 35.0% under the age of 18, 4.8% from 18 to 24, 32.5% from 25 to 44, 23.7% from 45 to 64, and 4.0% who were 65 years of age or older. The median age was 35 years. For every 100 females, there were 100.1 males. For every 100 females age 18 and over, there were 97.7 males.

The median income for a household in the township was $96,711, and the median income for a family was $101,895. Males had a median income of $76,206 versus $37,404 for females. The per capita income for the township was $33,256. About 2.0% of families and 2.5% of the population were below the poverty line, including 3.8% of those under age 18 and 6.7% of those age 65 or over.

== Education ==
Upper Uwchlan Township is in the Downingtown Area School District.

Residents are within the Brandywine-Wallace, Pickering Valley, Shamona Creek, and Springton Manor elementary boundaries. The township is divided into two secondary boundaries: Downingtown Middle School and Downingtown West High School, and Lionville Middle School and Downingtown East High School.

St. Elizabeth School of the Roman Catholic Archdiocese of Philadelphia is in the township.

Windsor Christian Academy is in the township.

== Transportation ==
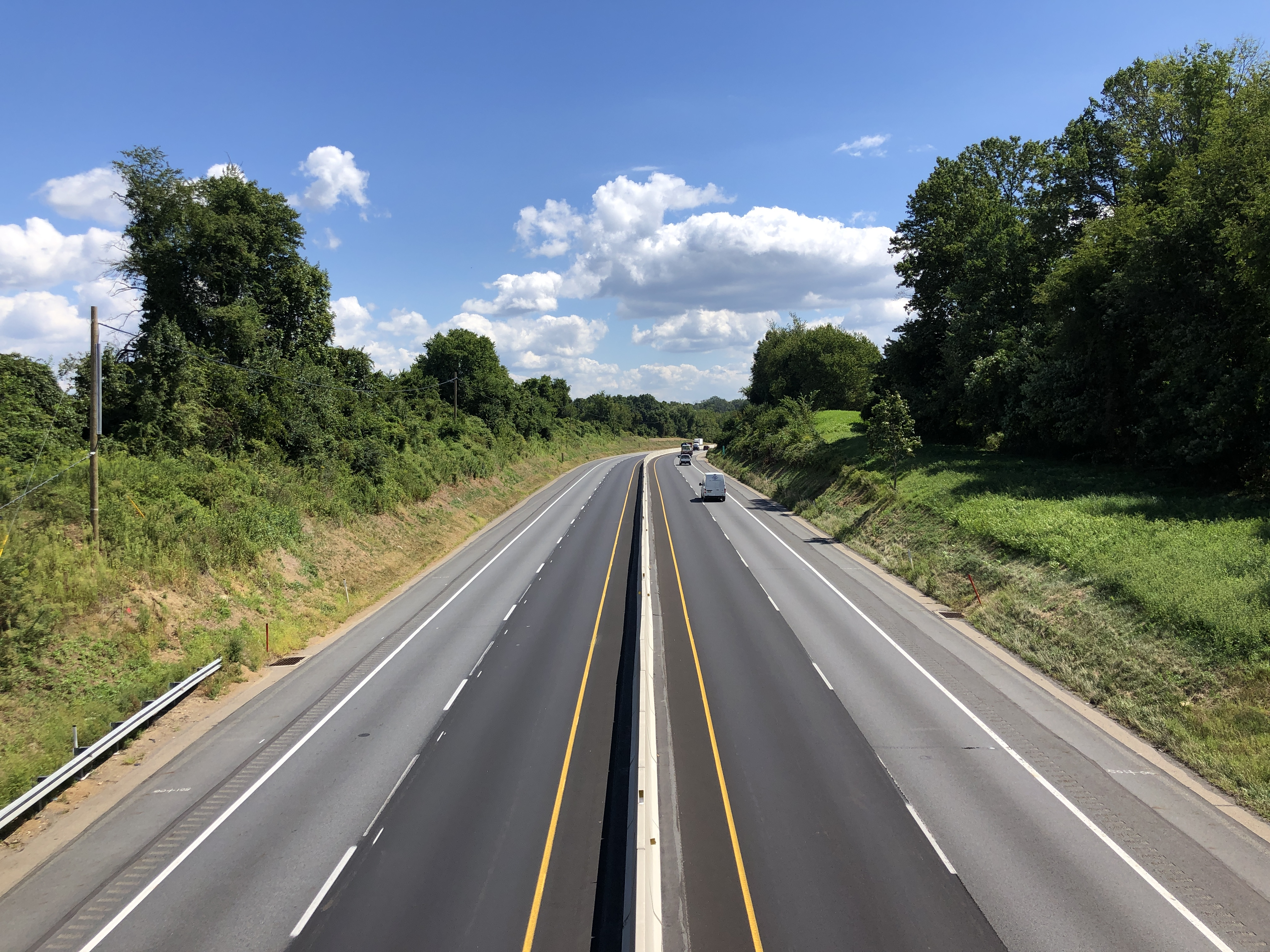
The Pennsylvania Turnpike/I-76 eastbound in Upper Uwchlan Township

As of 2019, there were 67.81 miles (109.13 km) of public roads in Upper Uwchlan Township, of which 4.00 miles (6.44 km) were maintained by the Pennsylvania Turnpike Commission (PTC), 4.28 miles (6.89 km) were maintained by the Pennsylvania Department of Transportation (PennDOT) and 59.53 miles (95.80 km) were maintained by the township.

The Pennsylvania Turnpike, also known as I-76, is the most prominent highway serving Upper Uwchlan Township. It follows a northwest-southeast alignment through the center of the township. Pennsylvania Route 100 follows the Pottstown Pike along a north-south alignment through the east and northeast portion of the township. Pennsylvania Route 401 follows Conestoga Road along a northwest-southeast alignment across the northeastern corner of the township.

== Places of worship ==
Windsor Baptist Church, founded in 1833 is located in the township at 213 Little Conestoga Road, in the village of Eagle. Saint Elizabeth, a Catholic church, is located at 100 Fellowship Road, at Pottstown Pike. Just south of it, on Pottstown Pike, is Beth Israel Congregation of Chester County (founded 1904), Upper Uwchlan's only synagogue. It is also a school

== See also ==
- Welsh Tract
