= Larkin Covered Bridge (Chester Springs, Pennsylvania) =

- U.S. National Register of Historic Places
- Larkin Covered Bridge originally spanned Marsh Creek in Milford Mills, Pennsylvania

- Location within Pennsylvania Location within the United States
- Location: Eagle, Upper Uwchlan Township, Pennsylvania
- Coordinates: 40°4′56″N 75°41′8″W
- Area: less than one acre
- Built: 1881 (original bridge 1854)
- Built by: Wood, Menander & Ferdinand
- Architectural style: Burr truss
- MPS: Covered Bridges of Chester County TR
- NRHP reference No.: 80003458
- Added to NRHP: December 10, 1980

The Larkin Covered Bridge is a 60-foot-long (18 m), Burr truss wooden covered bridge that is located outside of Chester Springs, Chester County, Pennsylvania, near the village of Eagle. The bridge, which originally crossed over Marsh Creek, now spans a dry ditch and is a feature of the Upper Uwchlan Township trail system.

== History ==
The original bridge was built in 1854 to span Marsh Creek, a tributary of the east branch of the Brandywine Creek, beside Jesse Larkin's Gristmill near the village of Milford Mills, 2.5 miles (4.0 km) southwest of its current location. The bridge was rebuilt in 1881.

In 1972, the Commonwealth of Pennsylvania acquired the Larkin Bridge and relocated it 1 mile (1.6 km) to the north prior to the evacuation of Milford Mills and the creation of Marsh Creek Lake in Marsh Creek State Park. The bridge was used as a pedestrian crossing between two day camps in the new state park. Larkin Bridge was listed on the National Register of Historic Places in 1980.

In 1998, Upper Uwchlan Township acquired the bridge, and in 2006, the township government worked with developers (Toll Brothers, Orleans, and K. Hovnanian) to dismantle and relocate the bridge. Larkin Covered Bridge was rebuilt on the trail path next to the entrance to the Byers Station housing development on Graphite Mine Road near the village of Eagle.

== Gallery ==
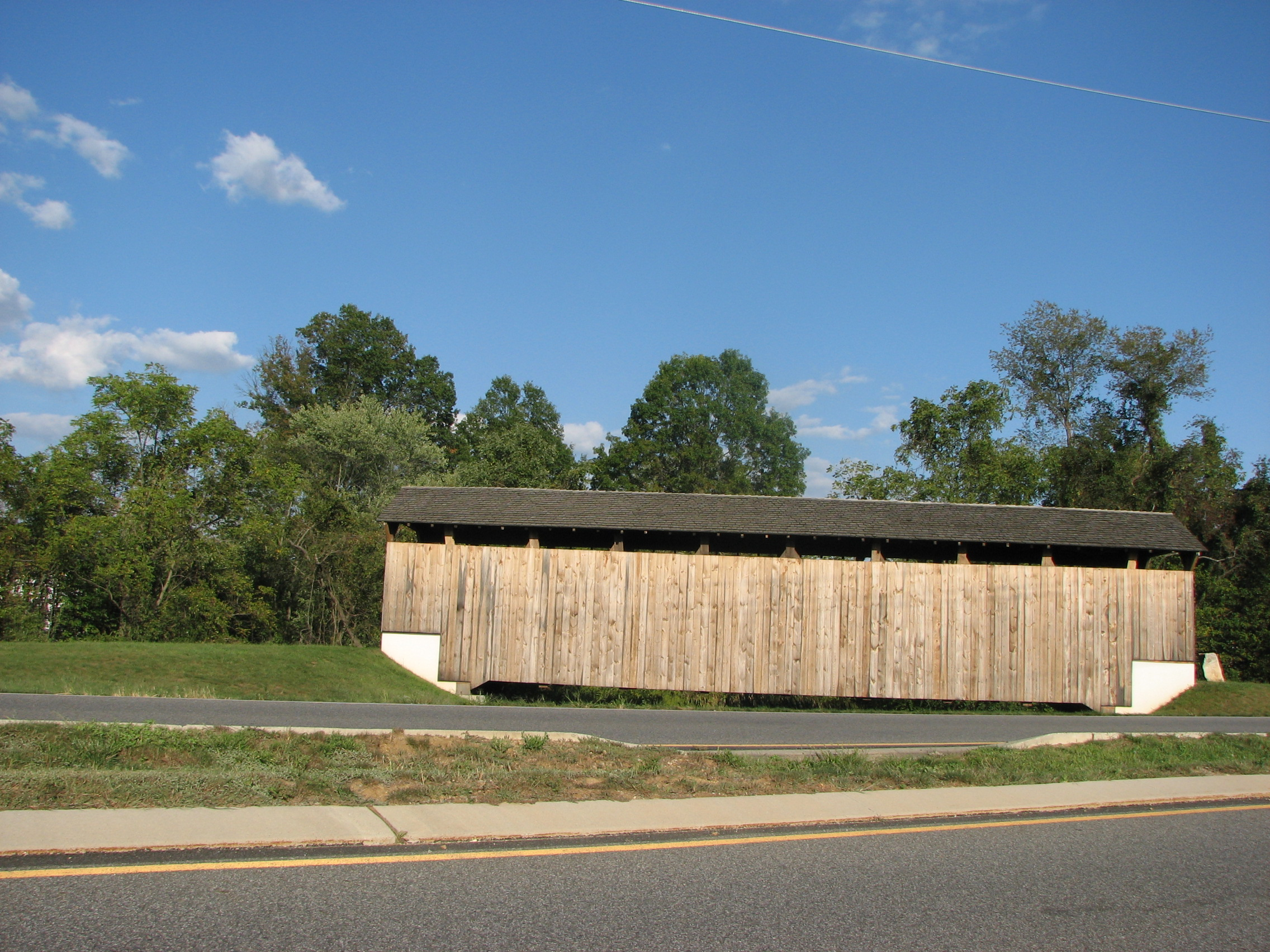
Larkin Covered Bridge September 2010
