= Linda Joy Holtzman =

American rabbi and author

Rabbi Linda Joy Holtzman

Religious life
- Religion: Judaism

Linda Joy Holtzman is an American rabbi and author. In 1979, she became one of the first women in the United States to serve as the presiding rabbi of a synagogue, and the first woman to serve as a rabbi for a solely Conservative congregation, when she was hired by Beth Israel Congregation of Chester County, which was then located in Coatesville, Pennsylvania.

== Biography ==
She had graduated in 1979 from the Reconstructionist Rabbinical College in Philadelphia, yet was hired by Beth Israel despite their being a Conservative congregation. Holtzman was thus the first woman to serve as a rabbi for a solely Conservative congregation, as the Conservative movement did not then ordain women. However, Sandy Eisenberg Sasso served as rabbi along with her husband at the congregation Beth-El Zedeck in Indianapolis from 1977 until 2013; Beth El Zedeck is identified with both the Reconstructionist and Conservative movements. In 1979, The New York Times published the article "Only Female Presiding Rabbi in U.S. Begins Her Work in a Small Town", in which the author described Holtzman's hiring as "a marked breakthrough for the growing numbers of women who have faced obstacles in becoming a rabbi-in-charge", and quoted Holtzman as saying "the fact that I have an appointment in a small town and that they have entrusted me with functions they believe are important is very significant for women and for the Jewish community". In 1981 Holtzman became the first female rabbi to give a keynote speech for the World Congress of Gay and Lesbian Jews.

She is the author of the article "Struggle, Change and Celebration: My Life as a Lesbian Rabbi" in the book Lesbian Rabbis: The First Generation, edited by Rebecca Alpert, Sue Levi Elwell, and Shirley Idelson (Rutgers University Press, 2000). She also wrote a chapter in Twice Blessed (Beacon Press, 1989) titled "Jewish Lesbian Parenting."

She is now the Adjunct Associate Professor of Practical Rabbinics at the Reconstructionist Rabbinical College and the rabbi of the Tikkun Olam Chavurah in Philadelphia. She is also the leader of her local Reconstructionist chevra kadisha.

== See also ==
- Timeline of women rabbis
