= Marsh Creek State Park =

State park in Chester County, PA

- Marsh Creek State Park in 2026

- Location within Pennsylvania Location within the United States
- Interactive map of Marsh Creek State Park
- Location: Chester County, Pennsylvania, United States
- Coordinates: 40°04′05″N 75°43′09″W
- Area: 1,784 acres (722 ha)
- Elevation: 459 feet (140 m)
- Established: 1974
- Administrator: Pennsylvania Department of Conservation and Natural Resources
- Website: Official website
- Pennsylvania State Parks

Marsh Creek State Park is a 1,705 acres (690 ha) Pennsylvania state park in Upper Uwchlan and Wallace Townships, Chester County, Pennsylvania in the United States. The park is the location of the 535-acre (217 ha) man-made Marsh Creek Lake. With an average depth of 40 feet (73 feet at its deepest), the lake is stocked with fish and is a stop for migrating waterfowl. Marsh Creek State Park is 2 miles (3.2 km) west of Eagle on Pennsylvania Route 100. Park road hours 8:00 am until sunset. All other access open 24 hours.

== History ==
Formation of Marsh Creek Lake was designed to address several water related problems in the region. Foremost, to provide additional drinking water for the Chester County Water Resources Authority, alleviating a previous shortage. Additionally, to limit potential damage caused by seasonal flooding in the area. Finally, to provide a recreation area for residents throughout the region.

The state of Pennsylvania acquired the land that became Marsh Creek State Park between 1964 and 1978. Residents in the area were relocated including those residing in the farming village of Milford Mills, the site of which was eventually inundated. From 1970-1973 construction cleared the valley of trees, structures and other obstacles. Following completion of the dam, the lake filled over the course of three years. The Larkin Covered Bridge was removed from its previous location to park property in 1972.

Upon completion of the reservoir, the Commonwealth of Pennsylvania bought the land surrounding Marsh Creek Lake, constructed recreational facilities, and opened the land to the public. New facilities built from 1971 to 1979 included administrative and picnic areas, a playground, pool, and wells. The park opened for boating, fishing, hiking, hunting, ice sports and sailing in 1974; and the pool and day-use area opened in July 1979.

The park's visitor center

In 2026, a visitor center opened on the south shore of the lake.

== Recreation ==
=== Fishing and boating ===
Marsh Creek Lake is open to fishing and recreational boating. It is a warm water fishery with largemouth bass, black crappie, walleye, tiger muskellunge, and channel catfish all swimming in its waters. The lake is a designated "big bass" lake - only bass 15 inches (38 cm) and greater may be kept. Bass smaller than 15 inches (38 cm) must be released back into the lake.

Gasoline-powered boats are prohibited at Marsh Creek Lake. Boaters are restricted to using non-powered or electric-powered boats. All boats must be properly registered with any state. Boat rentals, including canoes, sail boats and paddle boats, are available.

=== Hunting ===
About 900 acres (360 ha) of Marsh Creek State Park are open to hunting. Hunters are expected to follow the rules and regulations of the Pennsylvania Game Commission. The common game species are squirrels, pheasant, waterfowl, rabbits and white-tailed deer. The hunting of groundhogs is prohibited.

=== Swimming ===
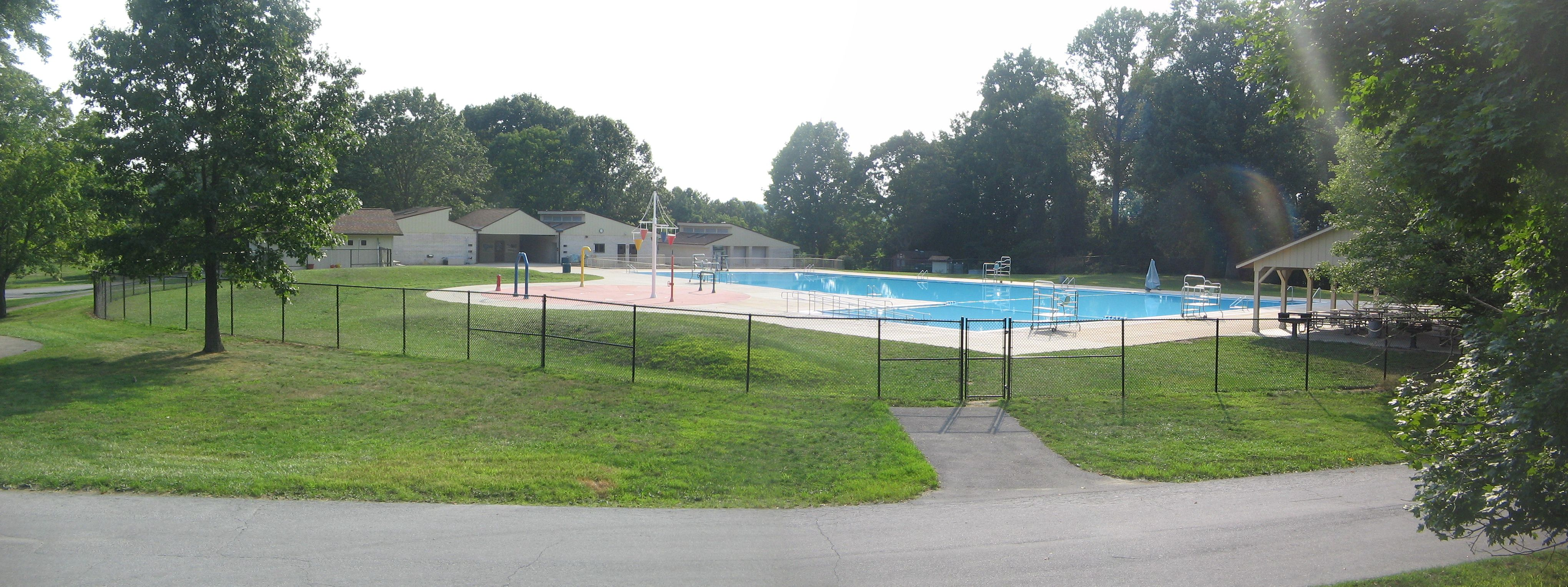
The park's swimming pool is open each summer

There is an L-shaped swimming pool that is open at Marsh Creek State Park from Memorial Day weekend to Labor Day weekend, from 11:00 am until 6:45 pm everyday except Fridays, where it is open 10:00 am until 5:45 pm. A shallow wading pool is available, as well as a bathhouse, splash park, sunning area, and snack bar. Swimming in the lake is not permitted.

=== Trails ===
There are about 12 miles (19 km) of trails for equestrian use, hiking, and mountain biking open around the lake. Many are available from the Chalfont Road parking area with additional trails from the west boat launch and on the north side of the dam.

=== Winter activities ===
Ice fishing, ice boating and ice skating on Marsh Creek Lake are popular winter activities.

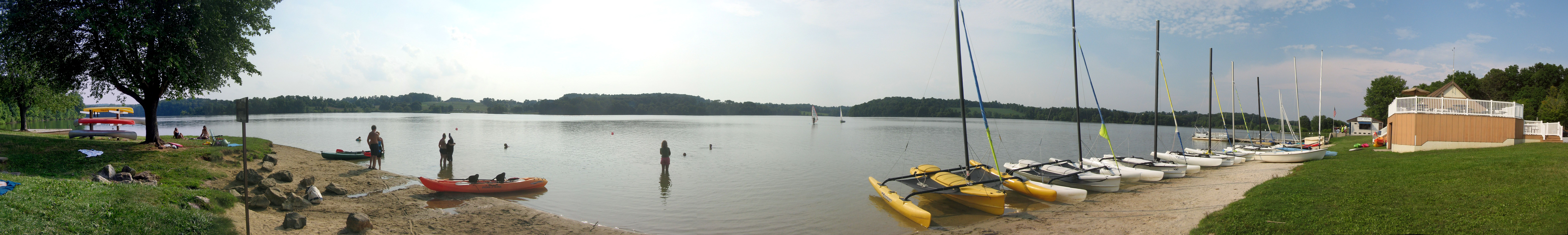
Panorama of the beach and lake at Marsh Creek State Park
