= National Register of Historic Places listings in northern Chester County, Pennsylvania =

Location of Chester County in Pennsylvania

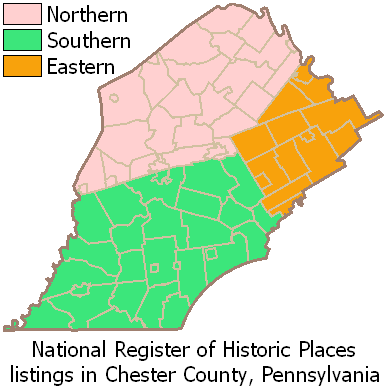
Map of Chester County (clickable)

This is a list of the National Register of Historic Places listings in northern Chester County, Pennsylvania.

This is intended to be a complete list of the properties and districts on the National Register of Historic Places in northern Chester County, Pennsylvania, United States. Northern Chester County is defined for this list as the municipalities north of the Philadelphia Main Line and west of a line extending from Phoenixville to Exton. The locations of National Register properties and districts for which the latitude and longitude coordinates are included below and may be seen in a map.

325 properties and districts are listed on the Register in Chester County, including 7 National Historic Landmarks. Northern Chester County includes 90 properties and districts, including 2 National Historic Landmarks; the county's remaining properties and districts are listed elsewhere. One district, the Middle Pickering Rural Historic District, is split between northern and eastern Chester County and is thus included on both lists.

This National Park Service list is complete through NPS recent listings posted October 30, 2026.

== Current listings ==
	Name on the Register	Image	Date listed	Location	Municipality	Description
1	Clement Atkinson Memorial Hospital	Clement Atkinson Memorial Hospital	September 8, 2011 (#11000642)	822–824 East Chestnut Street; 39°59′13″N 75°48′29″W	Coatesville	
2	Birchrunville General Store	Birchrunville General Store	March 21, 1978 (#78002368)	Hollow and Flowing Springs Roads, at Birchrunville; 40°07′51″N 75°38′26″W	West Vincent Township	
3	Birchrunville Historic District	Birchrunville Historic District	April 28, 1992 (#92000401)	Junction of Flowing Springs Road and Schoolhouse Ln. near Birchrunville; 40°07′56″N 75°38′19″W	West Vincent Township	
4	Bridge Mill Farm	Bridge Mill Farm	March 9, 1983 (#83002221)	Marshall Road near Downingtown; 40°03′22″N 75°45′35″W	East Brandywine Township	
5	Brower's Bridge	Brower's Bridge	June 22, 1988 (#88000754)	Mansion Road over French Creek; 40°08′51″N 75°46′10″W	East Nantmeal Township and Warwick Township	
6	Thomas Bull House	Thomas Bull House	August 3, 1979 (#79002198)	East of Elverson on Bulltown Road; 40°09′03″N 75°47′34″W	East Nantmeal Township	
7	Byers Station Historic District	Byers Station Historic District	February 20, 2002 (#02000062)	Junction of Byers and Eagle Farm Roads; 40°04′48″N 75°40′30″W	Upper Uwchlan Township	
8	Caln Meeting House	Caln Meeting House	May 3, 1984 (#84003182)	901 Caln Meeting House Road near Coatesville; 40°00′26″N 75°45′55″W	Caln Township	
9	Carver Court	Carver Court	May 31, 2016 (#16000310)	Foundry Street and Brooks Lane; 39°59′27″N 75°48′06″W	Caln Township	Public housing, just east of Coatesville, designed by Louis Kahn and Oscar Stonorov
10	Chester Springs Historic District	Chester Springs Historic District	May 17, 1971 (#71000691)	North of Chester Springs on Art School Road; 40°05′45″N 75°37′24″W	West Pikeland Township	
11	Clinger-Moses Mill Complex	Clinger-Moses Mill Complex	July 17, 1980 (#80003454)	South of Chester Springs on Pine Creek Lane; 40°04′58″N 75°36′49″W	West Pikeland Township	
12	Coatesville Historic District	Coatesville Historic District	May 14, 1987 (#87000667)	Roughly bounded by Chestnut Street, 6th Avenue, Oak Street, 5th Avenue, Harmony Street, and 1st Avenue; 39°58′57″N 75°49′04″W	Coatesville	
13	Coatesville Veterans Administration Hospital Historic District	Coatesville Veterans Administration Hospital Historic District	March 6, 2013 (#13000059)	1400 Blackhorse Hill Rd. 39°59′53″N 75°47′47″W	Coatesville	
14	Continental Powder Works at French Creek	Continental Powder Works at French Creek	November 24, 2015 (#15000827)	General area of Rapps Dam Rd. near Rapps Covered Bridge; 40°08′17″N 75°33′11″W	East Pikeland Township	
15	County Bridge No. 101	County Bridge No. 101	June 22, 1988 (#88000780)	Wagontown Road over Brandywine Creek, near Rock Run; 39°59′29″N 75°49′52″W	Valley Township	
16	County Bridge No. 124	County Bridge No. 124	June 22, 1988 (#88000760)	Edge Hill Road over Beaver Creek; 40°00′38″N 75°44′39″W	Downingtown	
17	Coventry Hall	Coventry Hall	December 16, 1974 (#74001767)	Off Pennsylvania Route 23; 40°10′30″N 75°41′14″W	South Coventry Township	
18	Coventryville Historic District	Coventryville Historic District	January 31, 1978 (#78002378)	South of Pottstown on Pennsylvania Route 23; 40°10′12″N 75°41′32″W	South Coventry Township	
19	Deery Family Homestead	Deery Family Homestead	December 23, 1977 (#77001153)	West of Phoenixville; 40°06′47″N 75°36′32″W	West Vincent Township	
20	Downingtown Log House	Downingtown Log House	May 24, 1979 (#79002195)	15 East Lancaster Avenue; 40°00′23″N 75°42′18″W	Downingtown	
21	East Lancaster Avenue Historic District	East Lancaster Avenue Historic District	December 11, 1979 (#79002196)	An irregular pattern along East Lancaster Avenue; 40°00′36″N 75°41′47″W	Downingtown	
22	Nicholas East House	Nicholas East House	April 2, 1973 (#73001614)	West of Valley Forge on Kimberton Road; 40°06′49″N 75°39′16″W	West Vincent Township	
23	Mendenhall Valentine Edge House	Mendenhall Valentine Edge House	August 6, 2026 (#100013303)	931 Bondsville Road; 40°00′42″N 75°44′41″W	Caln Township	
24	Elverson Historic District	Elverson Historic District	April 29, 1993 (#93000354)	Main, Chestnut and Hall Streets and Park Avenue; 40°09′24″N 75°49′56″W	Elverson	
25	Fagley House	Fagley House	May 3, 1976 (#76001628)	West of Phoenixville on Art School Road; 40°06′30″N 75°36′45″W	West Pikeland Township	
26	William Ferguson Farm	William Ferguson Farm	April 10, 1980 (#80003460)	East of Glen Moore on Marshall Road; 40°04′57″N 75°44′58″W	Wallace Township	
27	French Creek Farm	French Creek Farm	November 3, 1988 (#88002372)	Kimberton Road near Kimberton; 40°08′12″N 75°35′14″W	West Vincent Township	
28	Fricks Locks Historic District	Fricks Locks Historic District	November 21, 2003 (#03001188)	End of Fricks Lock Road, approximately 1000 feet east of Sanatoga Road; 40°13′21″N 75°35′47″W	East Coventry Township	
29	General Washington Inn	General Washington Inn	August 22, 1979 (#79002197)	Uwchlan and East Lancaster Avenues; 40°00′41″N 75°41′45″W	Downingtown	
30	Glenmoore Historic District	Glenmoore Historic District	March 18, 2011 (#11000107)	Junction of Fairview and Creek Roads; roughly bounded by Park Lane, Indiantown Road, and Howson Lane; 40°05′31″N 75°46′31″W	Wallace Township	
31	Hall's Bridge	Hall's Bridge	April 23, 1973 (#73001600)	About 3 miles (4.8 km) north of Chester Springs at Sheeder Road and Birch Run; 40°08′51″N 75°37′15″W	East and West Vincent Townships	
32	Hare's Hill Road Bridge	Hare's Hill Road Bridge	March 28, 1978 (#78002375)	West of Phoenixville on Hare's Hill Road; 40°08′27″N 75°34′06″W	East Pikeland Township	
33	George Hartman House	George Hartman House	March 26, 1976 (#76001629)	West of Phoenixville on Church Road; 40°06′13″N 75°35′32″W	East Pikeland Township	
34	Hatfield-Hibernia Historic District	Hatfield-Hibernia Historic District	June 20, 1984 (#84003205)	North of Wagontown; 40°01′24″N 75°50′46″W	West Brandywine Township and West Caln Township	
35	Hibernia House	Hibernia House	November 20, 1975 (#75001632)	North of Wagontown off Pennsylvania Route 340; 40°01′45″N 75°50′33″W	West Caln Township	
36	High Bridge	High Bridge	March 26, 1976 (#76001623)	Spans west branch of the Brandywine; 39°59′02″N 75°49′39″W	Coatesville	
37	Hockley Mill Farm	Hockley Mill Farm	December 18, 1990 (#90001921)	Warwick Furnace Road, southeast of Knauertown; 40°09′15″N 75°42′59″W	Warwick Township	
38	Hopewell Farm	Hopewell Farm	January 11, 2010 (#09001215)	1751 Valley Road; 39°58′01″N 75°52′09″W	Valley Township	
39	Hopewell Furnace National Historic Site	Hopewell Furnace National Historic Site	October 15, 1966 (#66000645)	5 miles (8.0 km) south of Birdsboro, near Pine Swamp; 40°12′20″N 75°46′06″W	Warwick Township	Extends into Berks County
40	Roger Hunt Mill	Roger Hunt Mill	January 4, 1980 (#80003457)	Race Street; 40°00′29″N 75°42′41″W	Downingtown	
41	Abram Huston House and Carriage House	Abram Huston House and Carriage House	September 15, 1977 (#77001149)	53 South 1st Avenue; 39°58′54″N 75°49′21″W	Coatesville	
42	Isabella Furnace	Isabella Furnace	September 6, 1991 (#91001135)	Bollinger Drive just north of Creek Road, near Brandywine Manor; 40°06′48″N 75°49′23″W	West Nantmeal Township	
43	Kennedy Bridge	Kennedy Bridge	January 21, 1974 (#74001770)	North of Kimberton off Pennsylvania Route 23 on Seven Stars Road over French Creek; 40°08′25″N 75°34′36″W	East Vincent Township	
44	Ker-Feal	Ker-Feal	November 7, 2003 (#03001125)	1081 Bodine Road, Chester Springs; 40°04′38″N 75°36′33″W	West Pikeland Township	
45	Kimberton Village Historic District	Kimberton Village Historic District	May 6, 1976 (#76001626)	Both sides of Hares Hill Road between Kimberton and Cold Stream; 40°07′47″N 75°34′36″W	East Pikeland Township	Originally listed in 1976, with a boundary increase in 1987.
46	John Knauer House and Mill	John Knauer House and Mill	May 30, 1985 (#85001173)	Pennsylvania Route 23 in Knauertown; 40°10′14″N 75°43′53″W	Warwick Township	
47	Lahr Farm	Lahr Farm	September 7, 1979 (#79002199)	East of Elverson on Pennsylvania Route 23; 40°09′39″N 75°46′10″W	Warwick Township	
48	Larkin Covered Bridge	Larkin Covered Bridge	December 10, 1980 (#80003458)	North of Downingtown in Marsh Creek State Park; 40°04′15″N 75°43′15″W	Upper Uwchlan Township	
49	Lightfoot Mill	Lightfoot Mill	April 13, 1973 (#73001616)	1703 Conestoga Road in Chester Springs; 40°04′53″N 75°38′40″W	West Pikeland Township	
50	Lionville Historic District	Lionville Historic District	December 1, 1980 (#80003459)	Roughly along Pennsylvania Route 100 and South Village Avenue in Lionville; 40°03′16″N 75°39′33″W	Uwchlan Township	
51	Lukens Historic District	Lukens Historic District	April 19, 1994 (#94001186)	50, 53, 76, and 102 South 1st Street; 39°58′52″N 75°49′21″W	Coatesville	
52	Lukens Main Office Building	Lukens Main Office Building	May 24, 1976 (#76001624)	50 South 1st Avenue; 39°58′54″N 75°49′25″W	Coatesville	
53	Marshall's Bridge	Marshall's Bridge	June 22, 1988 (#88000880)	Marshall Road over Culbertson Run; 40°03′23″N 75°45′31″W	East Brandywine Township	
54	Simon Meredith House	Simon Meredith House	December 16, 1974 (#74001772)	0.5 miles (0.8 km) west of Pughtown on Pughtown Road; 40°10′12″N 75°40′39″W	South Coventry Township	
55	Stephen Meredith House	Stephen Meredith House	April 29, 1993 (#93000355)	Pennsylvania Route 100 halfway between Bucktown and Pughtown; 40°10′17″N 75°39′41″W	South Coventry Township	
56	Nathan Michener House	Nathan Michener House	April 3, 1976 (#76001622)	West of Bucktown on Ridge Road; 40°10′25″N 75°40′30″W	South Coventry Township	
57	Middle Pickering Rural Historic District	Middle Pickering Rural Historic District	September 6, 1991 (#91001125)	Pikeland, Yellow Springs, Merlin, Church, and Pickering Roads; 40°05′40″N 75°34′38″W	East and West Pikeland Townships	Extends into Charlestown Township in Eastern Chester County
58	Nantmeal Village Historic District	Nantmeal Village Historic District	August 1, 2014 (#14000466)	Extending from jct. of Nantmeal, Fairview, Horseshoe Trail & Coventryville Rds. 40°08′30″N 75°42′18″W	East Nantmeal Township	
59	National Bank of Coatesville Building	National Bank of Coatesville Building	September 14, 1977 (#77001150)	235 East Lincoln Highway; 39°59′01″N 75°49′19″W	Coatesville	
60	North Warwick Historic and Archeological District	North Warwick Historic and Archeological District	February 24, 1995 (#95000135)	Pennsylvania Route 345 and Harmonyville, Bethesda, Hopewell, Piersol, Trythall, and Northside Roads; 40°11′18″N 75°46′08″W	Warwick Township	
61	Parker's Ford	Parker's Ford	March 17, 1983 (#83002226)	Old Schuylkill Road near Parkerford; 40°11′56″N 75°34′52″W	East Vincent Township	
62	Parkesburg National Bank	Parkesburg National Bank	August 29, 1980 (#80003467)	Gay and Main Streets; 39°57′35″N 75°55′22″W	Parkesburg	
63	Parkesburg School	Parkesburg School	April 27, 1995 (#95000524)	360 Strasburg Avenue; 39°57′40″N 75°55′14″W	Parkesburg	
64	Passtown Elementary School	Passtown Elementary School	June 13, 2022 (#100007787)	890 West Lincoln Hwy. 39°59′02″N 75°50′45″W	Valley Township	
65	Pleasant Hill Plantation	Pleasant Hill Plantation	February 24, 1983 (#83002227)	Little Conestoga Road near Glen Moore; 40°07′02″N 75°47′00″W	West Nantmeal Township	
66	Pottstown Landing Historic District	Pottstown Landing Historic District	August 31, 2001 (#01000927)	Roughly bounded by U.S. Route 422 bypass, Whartnaby Street 633 Laurelwood Road and Reiff Street; 40°14′17″N 75°39′51″W	North Coventry Township	
67	Prizer's Mill Complex	Prizer's Mill Complex	September 6, 1978 (#78002376)	West of Phoenixville on Seven Stars Road; 40°08′16″N 75°34′27″W	East Pikeland Township	
68	Rapps Bridge	Rapps Bridge	June 18, 1973 (#73001608)	Rapps Dam Road off of Route 23; 40°08′22″N 75°32′34″W	East Pikeland Township	
69	Reading Furnace Historic District	Reading Furnace Historic District	July 30, 1987 (#87000797)	Mansion Road; 40°08′49″N 75°46′08″W	Warwick Township	
70	Rice-Pennebecker Farm	Rice-Pennebecker Farm	August 21, 1986 (#86001765)	Clover Mill Road near Chester Springs; 40°06′07″N 75°35′59″W	West Pikeland Township	
71	River Bend Farm	River Bend Farm	August 29, 1980 (#80003468)	North of Spring City on Sanatoga Road; 40°13′47″N 75°35′53″W	East Coventry Township	
72	Philip Rogers House	Philip Rogers House	May 25, 1973 (#73001617)	Ridge Road; 40°10′29″N 75°43′11″W	Warwick Township	
73	Robert Rooke House	Robert Rooke House	September 19, 1973 (#73001602)	North of Downingtown on Horseshoe Trail at Fellowship Road; 40°07′19″N 75°39′42″W	West Vincent Township	
74	St. Mary's Episcopal Church	St. Mary's Episcopal Church	February 16, 1996 (#96000082)	Warwick Road near Elverson; 40°09′57″N 75°46′52″W	Warwick Township	
75	St. Paul African Methodist Episcopal Church	St. Paul African Methodist Episcopal Church	December 12, 2012 (#12001042)	703 Merchant St. 39°59′15″N 75°48′41″W	Coatesville	
76	St. Peters Village Historic District	St. Peters Village Historic District	November 23, 2003 (#03001189)	Eastern and western sides of St. Peters Road between School Road and Rock Run Road; 40°10′51″N 75°43′46″W	Warwick Township	
77	Sandy Hill Tavern	Sandy Hill Tavern	December 10, 1980 (#80003461)	Southeast of Honey Brook on Pennsylvania Route 340; 40°01′00″N 75°53′46″W	West Caln Township	
78	Springton Manor Farm	Springton Manor Farm	August 7, 1979 (#79002200)	South of Glenmoore at Springton and Creek Roads; 40°04′18″N 75°46′40″W	Wallace Township	
79	Strickland-Roberts Homestead	Strickland-Roberts Homestead	January 30, 1978 (#78002372)	3 miles (4.8 km) south of Kimberton on St. Matthews Road; 40°07′20″N 75°38′06″W	West Vincent Township	
80	Terracina	Terracina	December 13, 1978 (#78002369)	76 South 1st Avenue; 39°58′52″N 75°49′21″W	Coatesville	
81	Townsend House	Townsend House	December 16, 1974 (#74001773)	Southwest of Pughtown off Pennsylvania Route 100; 40°09′51″N 75°40′21″W	South Coventry Township	
82	Uwchlan Meetinghouse	Uwchlan Meetinghouse	September 20, 1973 (#73001606)	North Village Avenue (Pennsylvania Route 113) in Lionville; 40°03′16″N 75°39′37″W	Uwchlan Township	
83	Vincent Forge Mansion	Vincent Forge Mansion	May 9, 1985 (#85001003)	Cook's Glen Road R.D. 40°09′26″N 75°38′29″W	East Vincent Township	
84	Warrenpoint	Warrenpoint	November 11, 1975 (#75001630)	West of Knauertown off Pennsylvania Route 23; 40°09′52″N 75°44′37″W	Warwick Township	
85	Warwick Furnace/Farms	Warwick Furnace/Farms	September 13, 1976 (#76001627)	South of Knauertown off Pennsylvania Route 23 on Warwick Furnace Road; 40°09′03″N 75°44′28″W	East Nantmeal Township	
86	Warwick Mills	Warwick Mills	December 30, 1974 (#74001769)	East of Elverson off Pennsylvania Route 23 on James Mills Road; 40°08′54″N 75°45′19″W	Warwick Township	
87	Welkinweir	Welkinweir	September 7, 2001 (#01000953)	1368 Prizer Road; 40°09′13″N 75°40′55″W	East Nantmeal Township	
88	West Vincent Highlands Historic District	West Vincent Highlands Historic District	May 7, 1998 (#98000400)	Birchrun Road, Pennsylvania Route 401, Fellowship Road, Horshoe Tr., Hollow Road, and Davis, Jaine, Green, Bartlett, and Mill Lns. 40°07′37″N 75°40′17″W	Upper Uwchlan and West Vincent Townships	
89	Wheelen House	Wheelen House	June 20, 1974 (#74001768)	Northeast of Downingtown on Fellowship Road; 40°06′21″N 75°40′35″W	Upper Uwchlan Township	
90	Jacob Winings House and Clover Mill	Jacob Winings House and Clover Mill	August 17, 1979 (#79002203)	Southwest of Phoenixville on James Mill Road; 40°09′01″N 75°45′52″W	Warwick Township	

== Former listing ==
	Name on the Register	Image	Date listed	Date removed	Location	City or town	Description
1	Nelson P. Boyer Barn		June 20, 1985 (#85003654)	July 26, 1991	Old Wilmington Rd.	East Fallowfield Township	
