= Warwick Furnace Farms =

Historic district in Pennsylvania, United States

- Warwick Furnace/Farms
- U.S. National Register of Historic Places
- U.S. Historic district
- Pennsylvania state historical marker
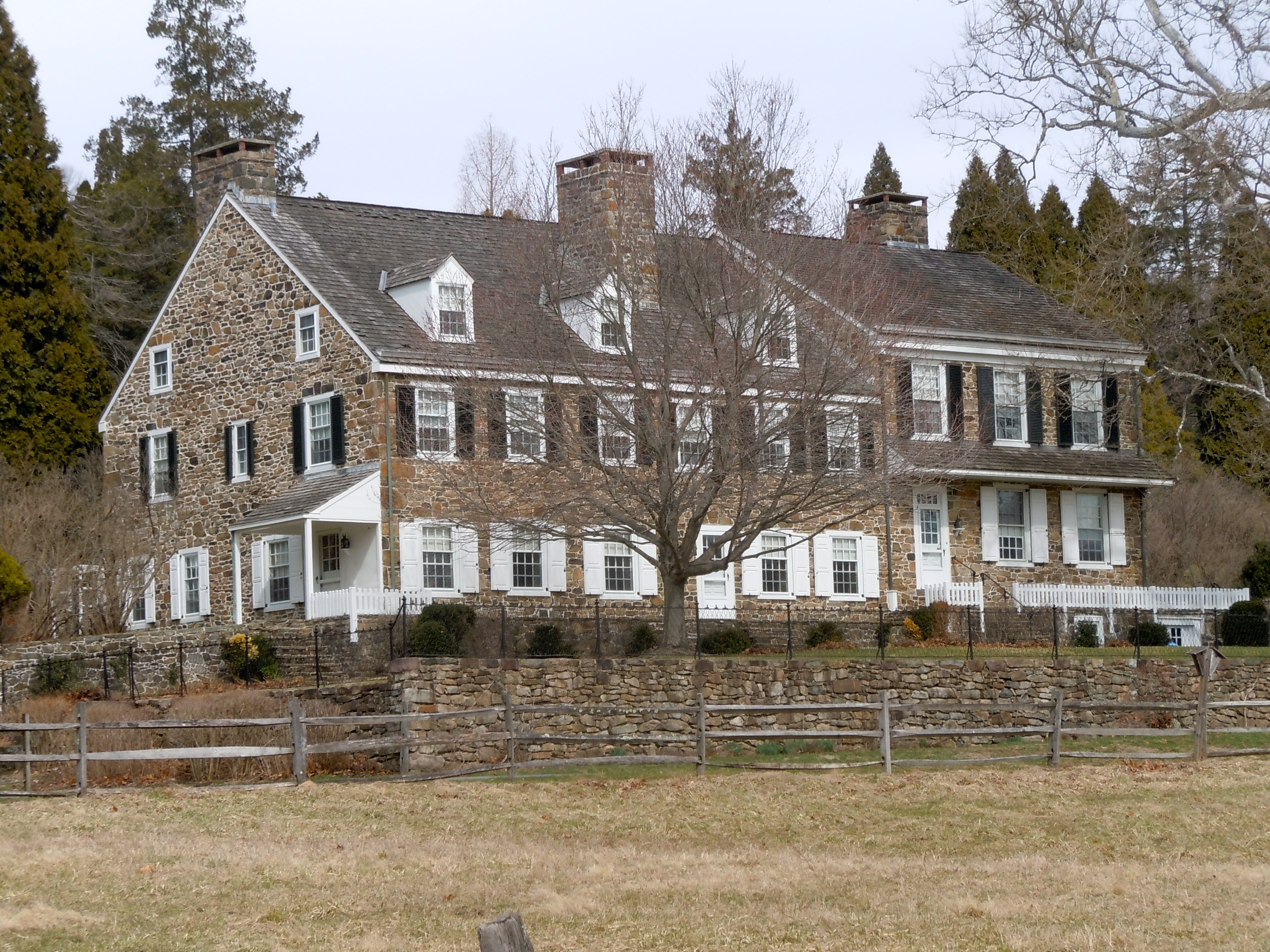
- Farmhouse

- Location within Pennsylvania Location within the United States
- Nearest city: Knauertown, Pennsylvania
- Coordinates: 40°9′3″N 75°44′28″W
- Area: 786.4 acres (318.2 ha)
- Built: 1738
- NRHP reference No.: 76001627

Significant dates
- Added to NRHP: September 13, 1976
- Designated PHMC: May 12, 1948

The Warwick Furnace Farms is a historic district that is located in northern Chester County, Pennsylvania, United States that includes the ruins of an early iron furnace that was owned by Anna Rutter Nutt, widow of Samuel Nutt.

== History and architectural features ==
Anna Rutter Nutt was the daughter of Thomas Rutter, who erected the first ironwork in Pennsylvania at Pine Forge Mansion and Industrial Site. Samuel Nutt bought the original tracts of land for a Coventry with partners William Branson and Mordecai Lincoln, the great-great-grandfather of Abraham Lincoln. The furnace was managed by George Taylor when the first Franklin stoves were cast here. The furnace operated through the 1860s and supplied the iron used in the iron-clad ship the USS Monitor during the Civil War. The 786.4-acre (318.2 ha) historic district was listed by the National Register of Historic Places in 1976.

A historical marker on the site reads:

"Warwick Furnace Built 1737 by Anna Nutt & Co. Made first Franklin stoves. Supplied shot and cannon for American revolutionists." Its last iron was made in 1867.
Marked 1910 Chester Co. Historical Society

Several other sites listed by the National Register of Historic Places are located within a couple of miles of the site, including Hockley Mill Farm, to the east on Warwick Furnace Road, Warrenpoint to the north, Reading Furnace Historic District and Warwick Mills to the west, and Brower's Bridge upstream (west) on the South Branch of French Creek. Warrenpoint was owned by Nutt's partner William Branson and both are considered early iron pioneers.

In 2015, the French & Pickering Creeks Conservation Trust permanently protected the 554-acre (224 ha) Warwick Furnace Farm through conservation easements and the acquisition of 108 acres (44 ha), which will be the future home of a public preserve.

The ironmaster's house and workers' houses, the historic farmhouse and the barns in this historic district are currently used in the operation of a working farm.

== Gallery ==
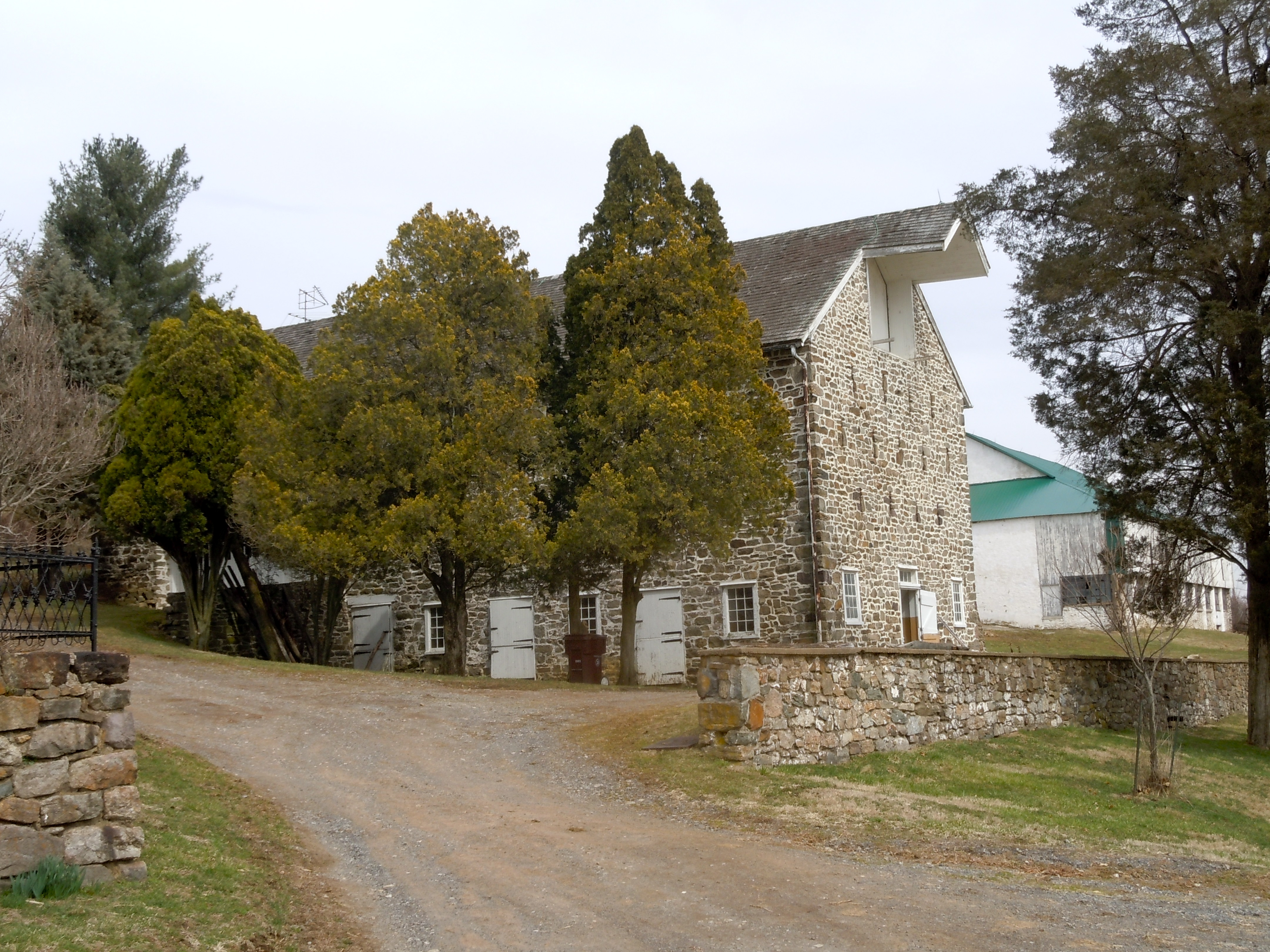
Barns on the farm

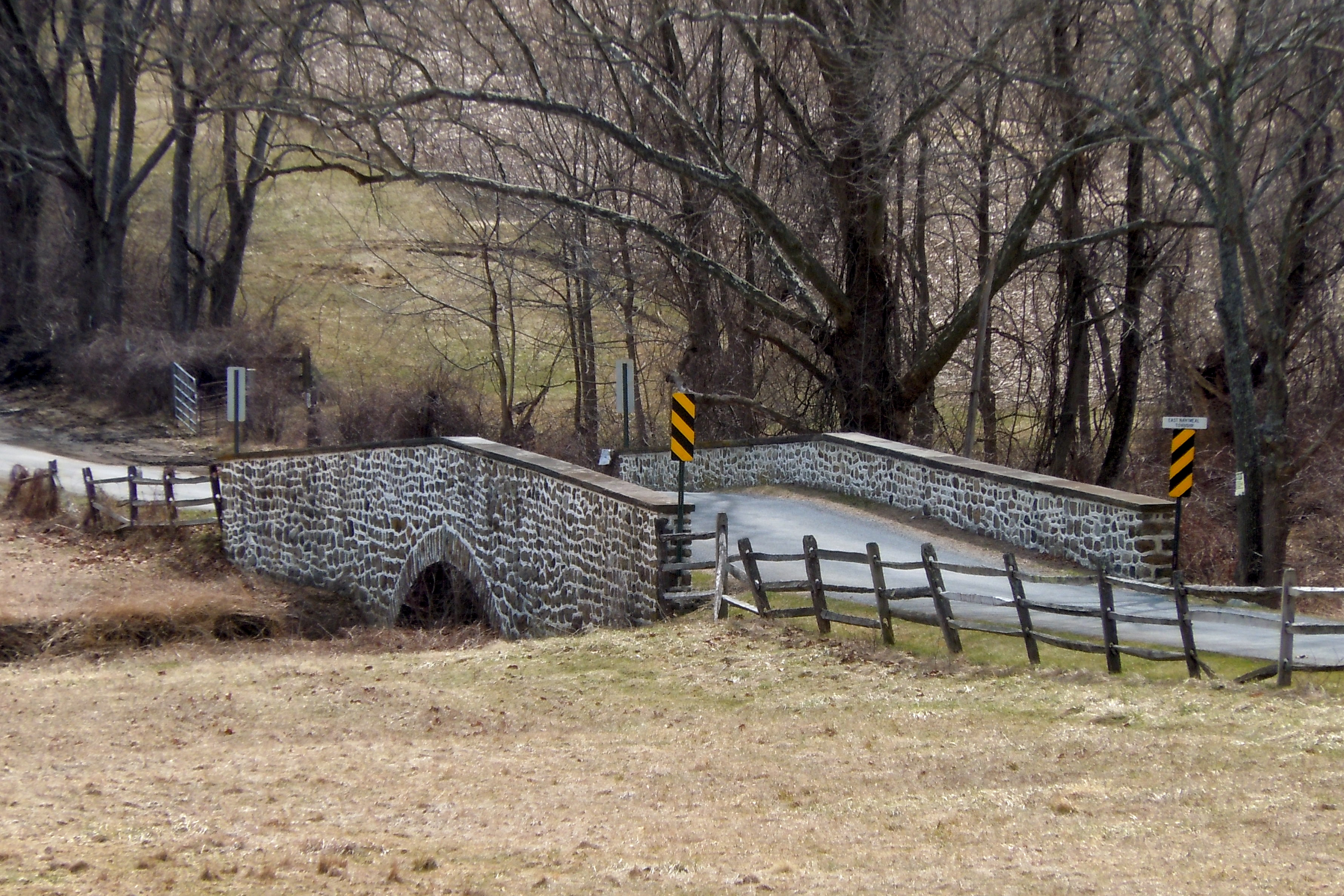
Bridge just south of the farmhouse built 1913 over the South Branch of French Creek

== Notable people ==
- Samuel Richards (1769-1842), 19th century ironmaster and Philadelphia businessman

== See also ==
- National Register of Historic Places listings in northern Chester County, Pennsylvania
- List of Washington's Headquarters during the Revolutionary War
- Reading Furnace
- Robert Grace
