= Lahr Farm =

- U.S. National Register of Historic Places
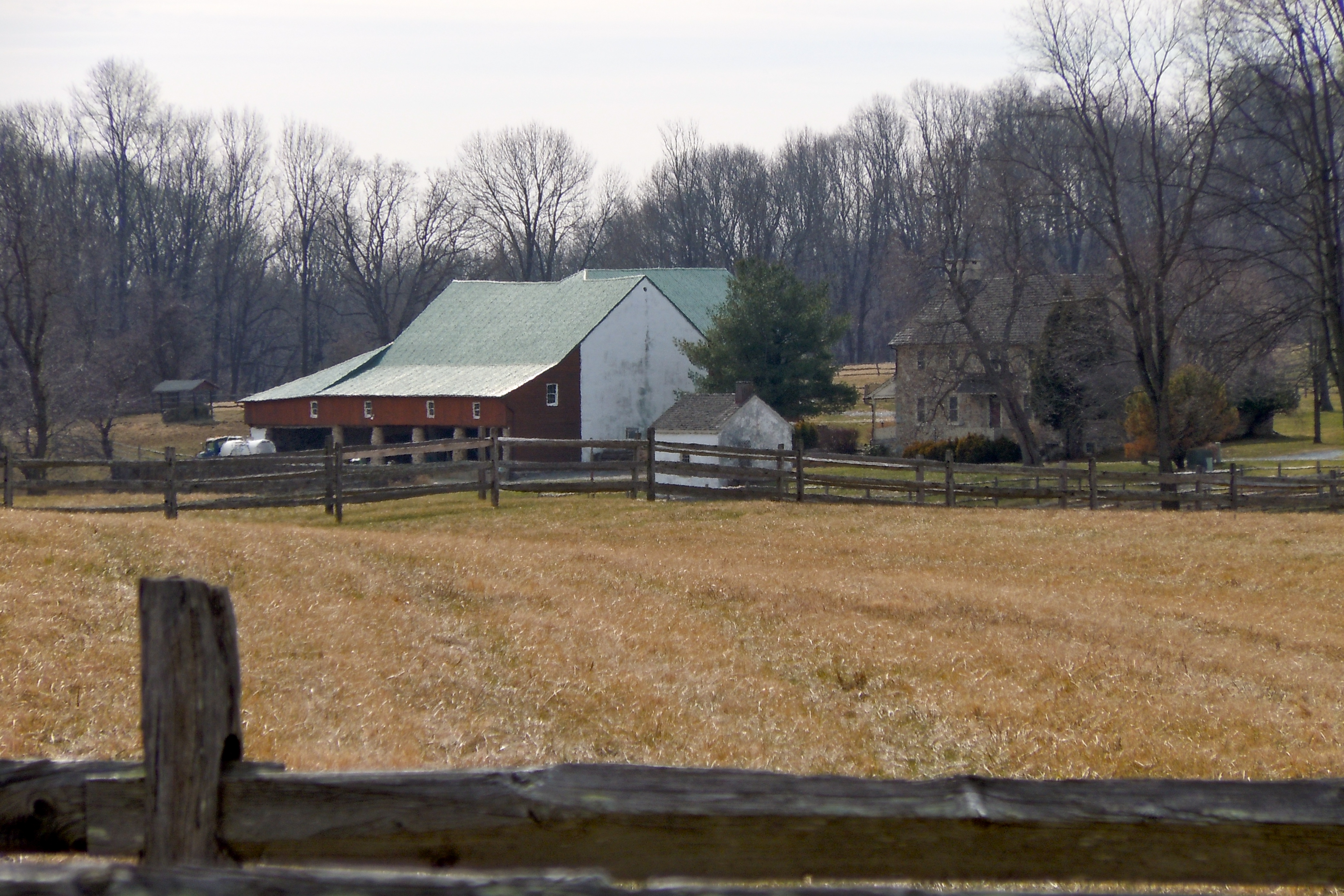
- Lahr Farm, March 2011

- Location within Pennsylvania Location within the United States
- Location: East of Elverson on Pennsylvania Route 23, Warwick Township, Pennsylvania
- Coordinates: 40°09′39″N 75°46′10″W
- Area: 10 acres (4.0 ha)
- Built: c. 1825
- NRHP reference No.: 79002199
- Added to NRHP: September 7, 1979

The Lahr Farm is an historic home and farm complex that is located in Warwick Township, Chester County, Pennsylvania. It was originally owned by a wealthy Quaker ironmaster William Branson and part of his Reading Furnace estate.

It was added to the National Register of Historic Places in 1979.

== History and architectural features ==
The farm has three contributing buildings; the main house, bank barn, and wash hour or latchen. The house is a 2 1/2-story, four-bay by two-bay, fieldstone dwelling with a gable roof. The farm was inherited by Branon's grandson a wealthy ironmaster Samuel Van Leer. The Van Leer Family's original surname spelling was Von Lahr. The farm remained in the Lahr family from 1834 to 1938.

== See also ==
- Warrenpoint (William Branson House)
- Reading Furnace Historic District
