= Hopewell Big Woods =

Forest in southeastern Pennsylvania, US

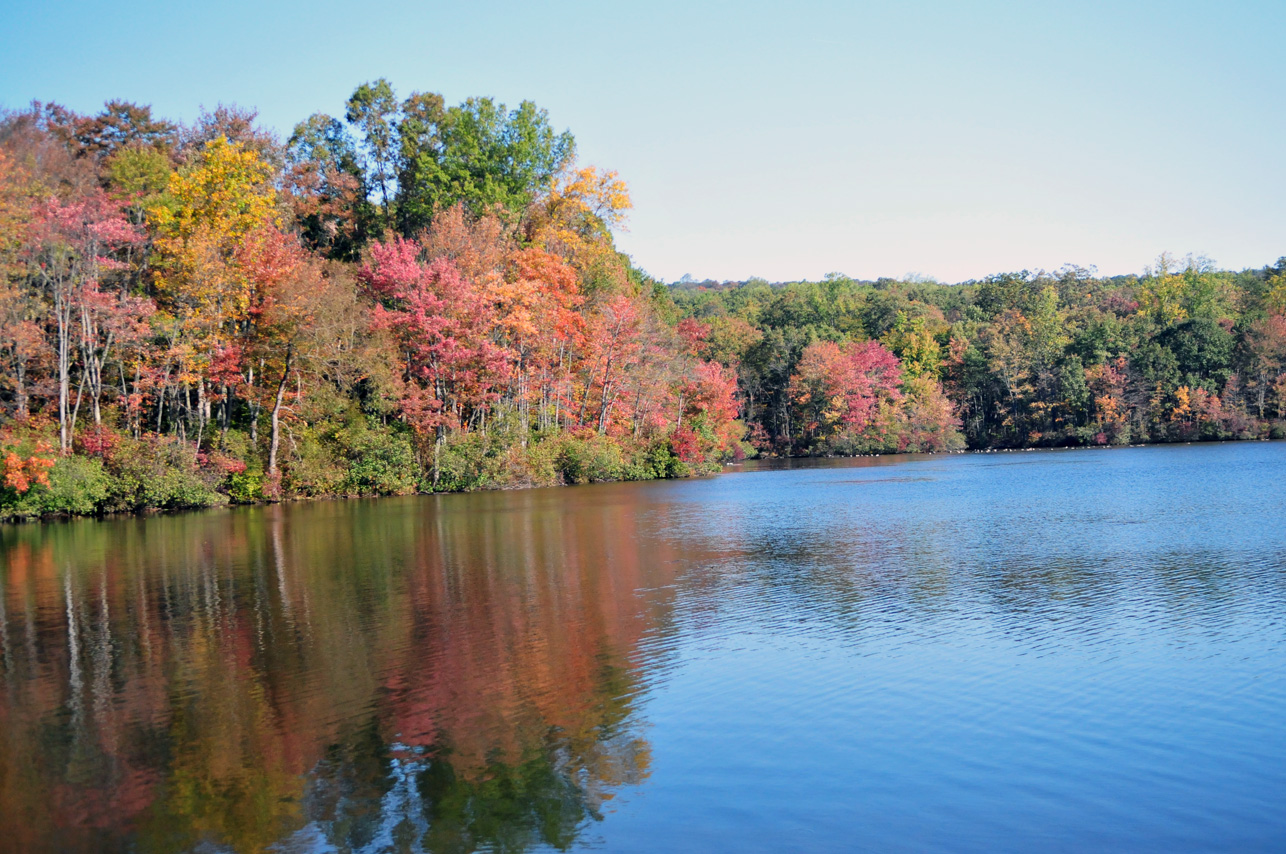
- Hopewell Lake in French Creek State Park of the Hopewell Big Woods

- Location within the United States
- Location: Berks and Chester, Pennsylvania, United States
- Nearest city: Warwick Township, PA
- Coordinates: 40°12′42″N 75°47′31″W
- Area: 73,000 acres (30,000 ha)

The Hopewell Big Woods is the largest contiguous forest in southeastern Pennsylvania. Spanning northern Chester County and southern Berks County, the region is approximately 73,000 acres or 114 square miles. Most of the forest is located in the Schuylkill River watershed.

== History ==
Hopewell Big Woods played a role in the iron industry’s expansion during the late 1700s and 1800s. Much of the forest was logged and used as charcoal to fuel local blast furnaces such as the Hopewell Furnace, Joanna Furnace, Reading Furnace and the Warwick Furnace.

There are thirty-five sites located in the Hopewell Big Woods that are listed on the National Register of Historic Places.

== Hopewell Big Woods Partnership ==
Led by French & Pickering Creeks Conservation Trust, the Hopewell Big Woods Partnership is an organizational network of over thirty government agencies, municipal entities, private non-profits, local businesses, individual landowners and other regional stakeholders interested in the conservation of the Hopewell Big Woods. The Partnership seeks to protect the many natural, cultural, and historic resources while encouraging recreation and economic development. Since the Partnership was formed in 2001, six goals have been established to guide conservation work in the region:

1. Forest Conservation
2. Water Conservation
3. Rare and Endangered Species Conservation
4. Recreation Resources
5. Compatible Economic Development
6. Historic and Cultural Resources

Based on workshops with local residents, the Partnership has identified an interest in improving the regional trail system and distributing information on such a system.

Their plan promotes cultural heritage tourism. The plan attempts to utilize the region’s “natural assets and cultural history as a catalyst for: saving historic structures; conserving the countryside; informing the region’s growing number of residents about the recreational facilities, preserves, and historic and cultural sites; attracting tourism; and, in turn, stimulating and supporting local economies.”

== Conservation ==
=== Ecology ===
The Hopewell Big Woods has a number of important, rare or endangered species of plants and animals.

Some of the native flora located in the ecosystem are:

- Bog bluegrass
- Nodding trillium
- Pink lady's slipper
- Highbush blueberry
- Common pawpaw
- Sugar maple

Some of the native fauna in the ecosystem are:

- Mink
- North American beaver
- North American river otter
- Bobcat
- Red fox
- Gray fox
- Coyote
- Bog turtle
- Brook trout

In April 2012, 750 acres of the Hopewell Big Woods, all within French Creek State Park, was burned in the longest, largest and most expensive wildfire in state history.

=== Astronomy ===
PA Outdoor Lighting Council designated Hopewell Big Woods as Pennsylvania’s first “Night Skies Conservation Area.” Utilizing the designated title, the council plans to inform homeowners, businesses and municipal officers about the negative effects of light pollution and to provide solutions on how to reduce or prevent it.

== Recreation ==
There are a number of public and open-to-the-public lands in the Hopewell Big Woods offering a variety of activities. Hiking, fishing, camping, horse-back riding, and rock climbing are some of the many recreational activities visitors can enjoy throughout the region (activities allowed vary by park). Public and open lands within the Hopewell Big Woods include:

- French Creek State Park
- Coventry Woods
- Warwick County Park
- Birdsboro Waters
- Crow’s Nest Preserve
- Welkinweir
- Hopewell Big Woods Trail
