= Saint Peters, Pennsylvania =

Unincorporated community in Pennsylvania, US

- Unincorporated community
- Location within Pennsylvania Location within the United States
- Coordinates: 40°10′48″N 75°43′51″W
- Country: United States
- State: Pennsylvania
- County: Chester
- Township: Warwick
- Elevation: 423 ft (129 m)
- Time zone: UTC-5 (Eastern (EST))
  - Summer (DST): UTC-4 (EDT)
- ZIP code: 19470
- Area codes: 610 and 484
- GNIS feature ID: 1204576

- St. Peters Village Historic District
- U.S. National Register of Historic Places
- U.S. Historic district
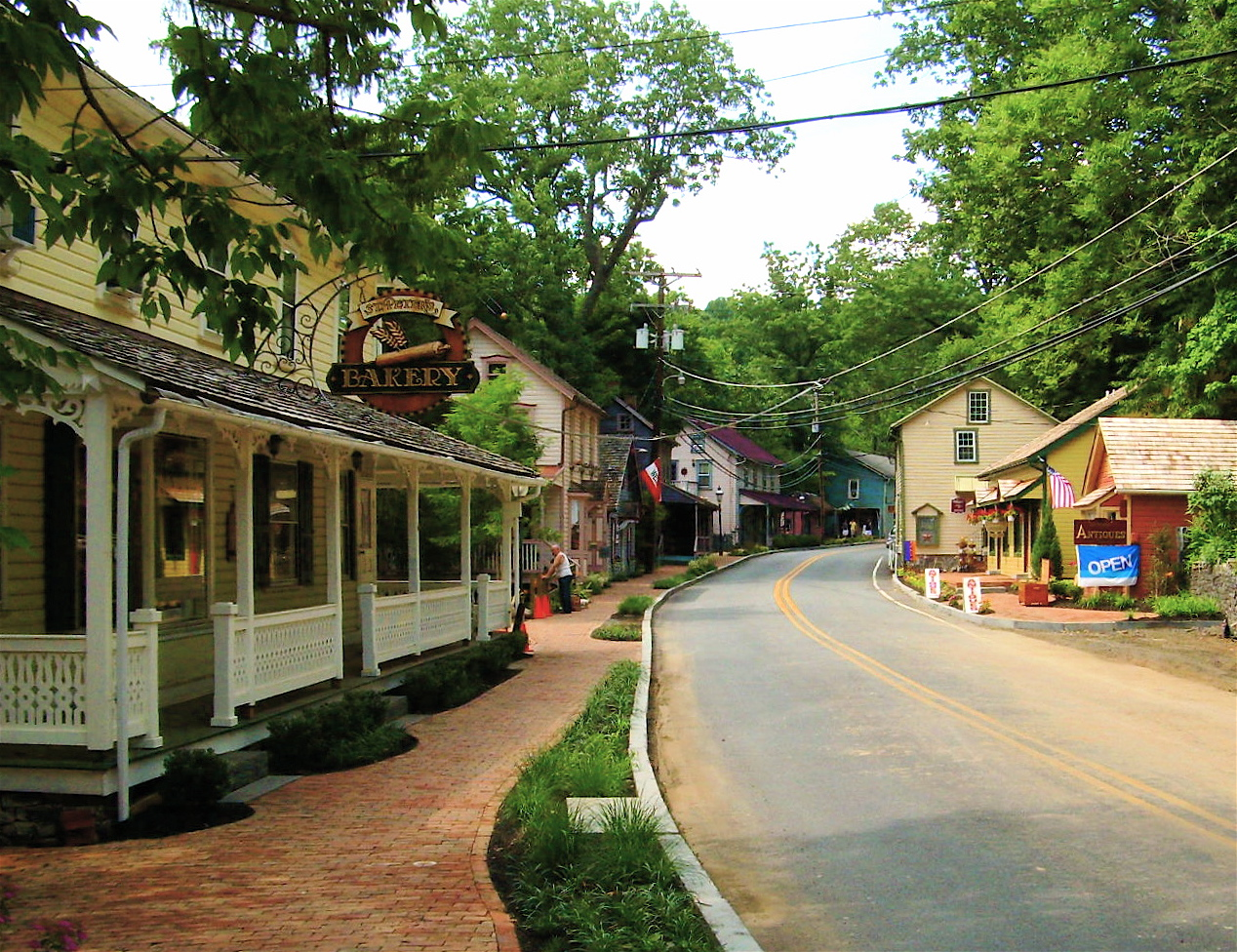
- The village, looking north on St. Peter's Road

- Location within Pennsylvania Location within the United States
- Nearest city: Knauertown, Pennsylvania
- Built: 1860
- Architect: Knauer, Davis
- Architectural style: Late Victorian
- NRHP reference No.: 03001189
- Added to NRHP: November 21, 2003

Saint Peters is a historic 19th-century industrial company village in Chester County, Pennsylvania, United States. Built near the Falls of French Creek in Warwick Township, it is situated in the Hopewell Big Woods.

== Geography ==
The town is located in a narrow ravine along French Creek. The Falls of French Creek have formed where French Creek cuts across a series of diabase (trap rock) dikes. Erosion of the diabase dikes by the creek has caused huge boulders to fall into the stream, almost filling the creek bed at points. The igneous intrusion that produced these diabase dikes also replaced limestone or marble in the surrounding rock with iron ores.

== History ==
The presence of iron ore led to the establishment of the French Creek iron mines in 1845. In 1880, quarrying of the diabase, known locally as "black granite", began, and the "Excursion House" hotel opened, distinguishing the community as both an industrial village and recreational weekend retreat. The bulk of the residence and businesses were built following the hotel's opening.

Spurs of the Reading Company and Delaware River and Lancaster railroad lines once ran through the village servicing the local mining, forging and quarrying operations.

By the early 1970s, industrial operations had ceased and the village was developed by its owners as a local tourist destination. Owned until 1978 by the Knauer family, it subsequently changed hands several times and portions of it are now privately owned. Historical preservation efforts, however, have led to the appearance of the village today that is almost entirely of its historic period. Local ordinances prevent exterior alterations to historic structures and limit new construction in designated areas in and around the village.

The main street, St. Peter's Road, is lined with private residences, a hotel and restaurant, and number of small specialty shops. The boulder-strewn French Creek running directly adjacent is one of the area's most popular attractions.

Saint Peters Village was entered onto the National Register of Historic Places in 2003.

In June 2026, the partnership that owns St. Peter's Village announced that it would be sold by auction on September 30, at the Desmond Hotel in Malvern.

== Gallery ==
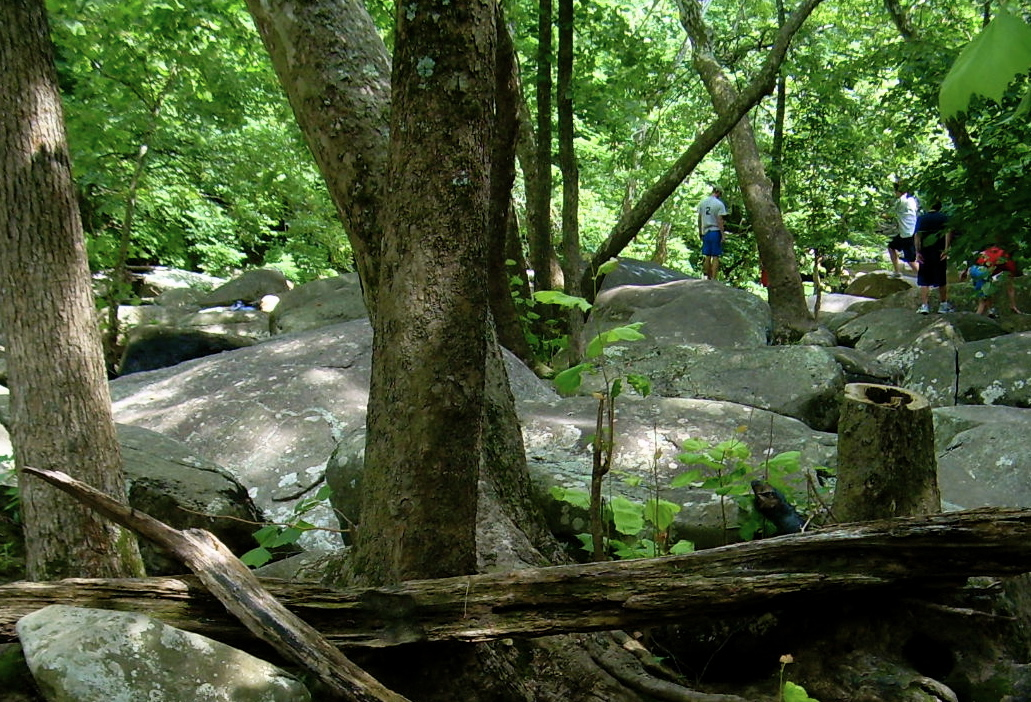
Rocks on French Creek

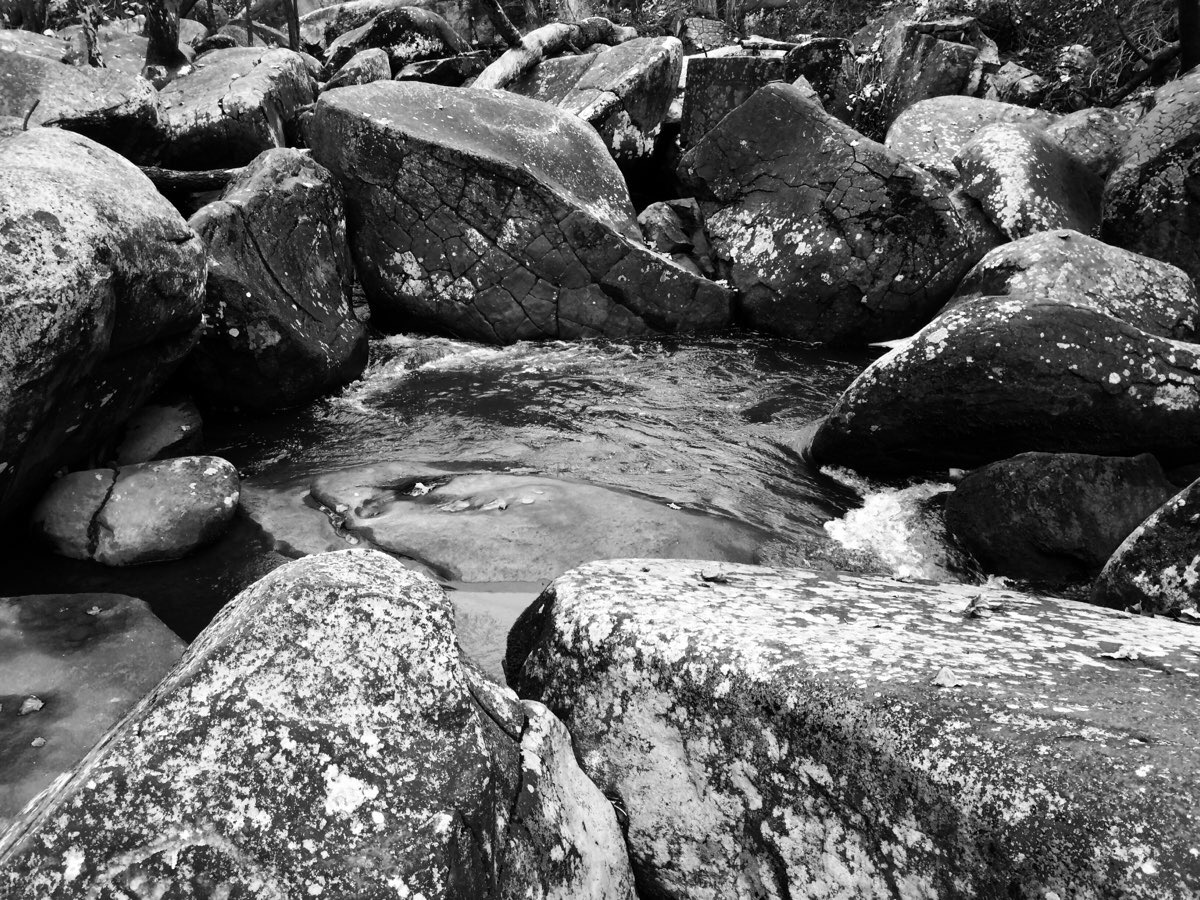
Rocks at Saint Peters, Pennsylvania
