= St. Paul African Methodist Episcopal Church (Coatesville, Pennsylvania) =

- U.S. National Register of Historic Places
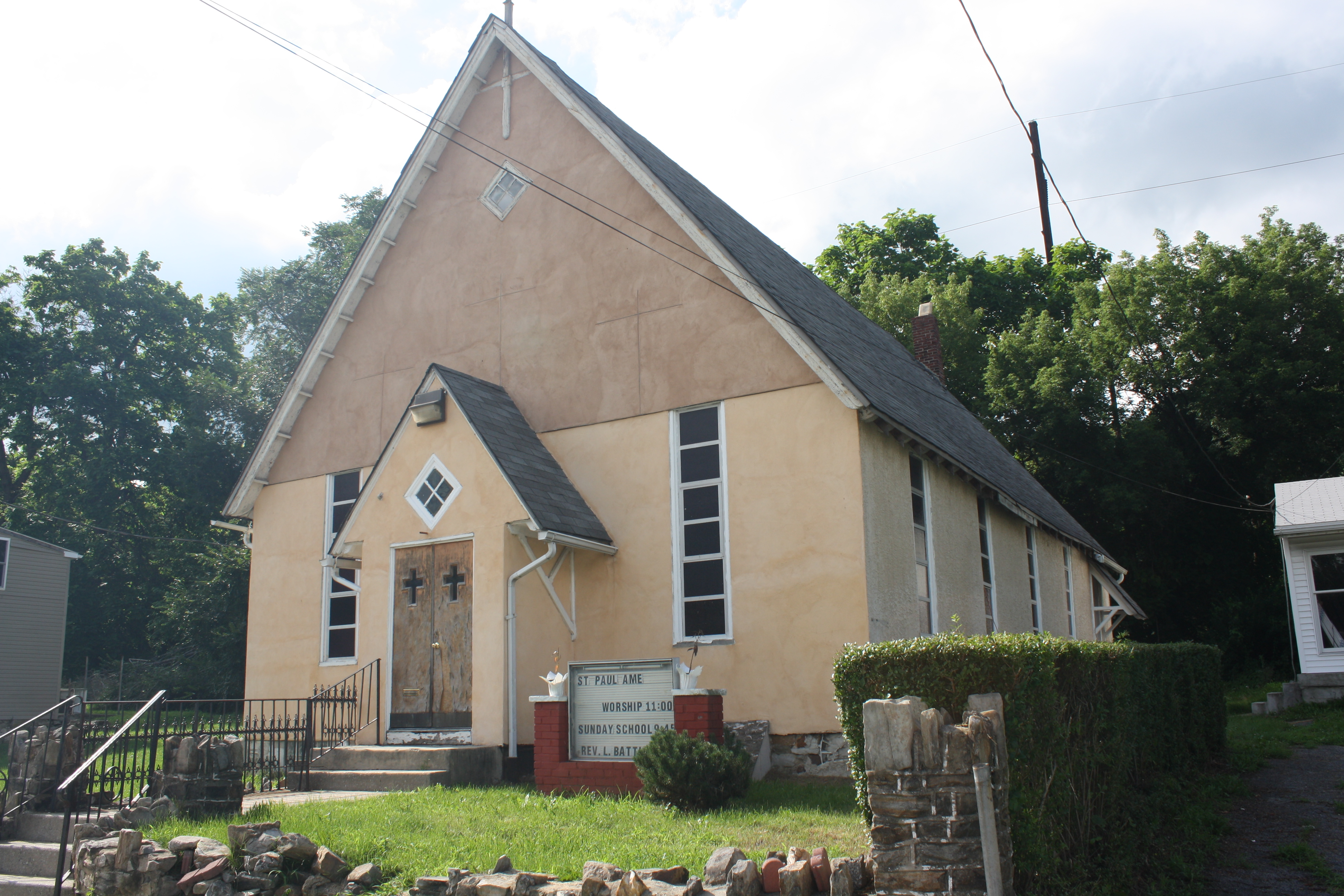

- Location within Pennsylvania Location within the United States
- Location: 703 Merchant Street; Coatesville, PA 19320
- Coordinates: 39°59′16″N 75°48′41″W
- Architectural style: Stick/Eastlake
- NRHP reference No.: 12001042
- Added to NRHP: December 12, 2012

St. Paul African Methodist Episcopal Church is a 19th-century African American church located at 703 Merchant Street in Coatesville, Pennsylvania. The church was organized in 1864, relocated to its current location in 1874, and substantially renovated in 1894. The building was listed on the National Register of Historic Places on December 12, 2012.

== See also ==
- National Register of Historic Places listings in northern Chester County, Pennsylvania
