= John Knauer House and Mill =

Historic house in Pennsylvania, United States

- U.S. National Register of Historic Places
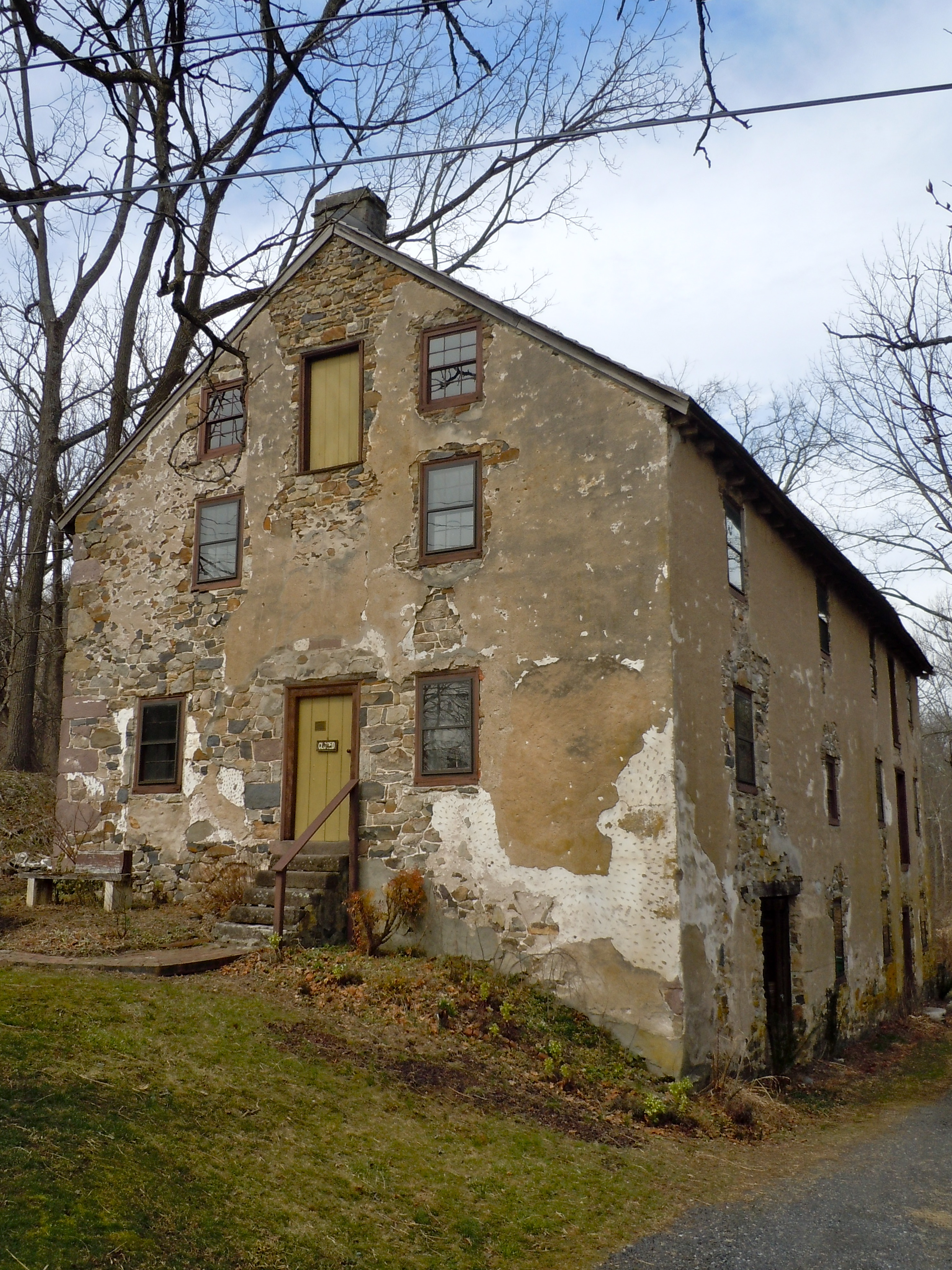
- Knauer Mill, March 2011

- Location within Pennsylvania Location within the United States
- Location: Pennsylvania Route 23 in Knauertown, Warwick Township, Pennsylvania
- Coordinates: 40°10′14″N 75°43′53″W
- Area: 2 acres (0.81 ha)
- Built: c. 1785-1790
- Built by: Knauer, John
- Architectural style: Georgian
- NRHP reference No.: 85001173
- Added to NRHP: May 30, 1985

The John Knauer House and Mill, also known as the Knauer Mill, is an historic grist mill complex in Warwick Township, Chester County, Pennsylvania, United States. The site is situated in the Hopewell Big Woods.

It was added to the National Register of Historic Places in 1985.

== History and architectural features ==
The complex was built roughly between 1785 and 1790, and includes the stone mill, 2 1/2-story stone miller's house, a stone and frame barn, and a small stone house. The miller's house is five bays by two bays, and was designed in the Georgian style. The mill remained in operation into the 1940s.
