= St. Mary's Episcopal Church (Elverson, Pennsylvania) =

Historic church in Pennsylvania, United States

- U.S. National Register of Historic Places
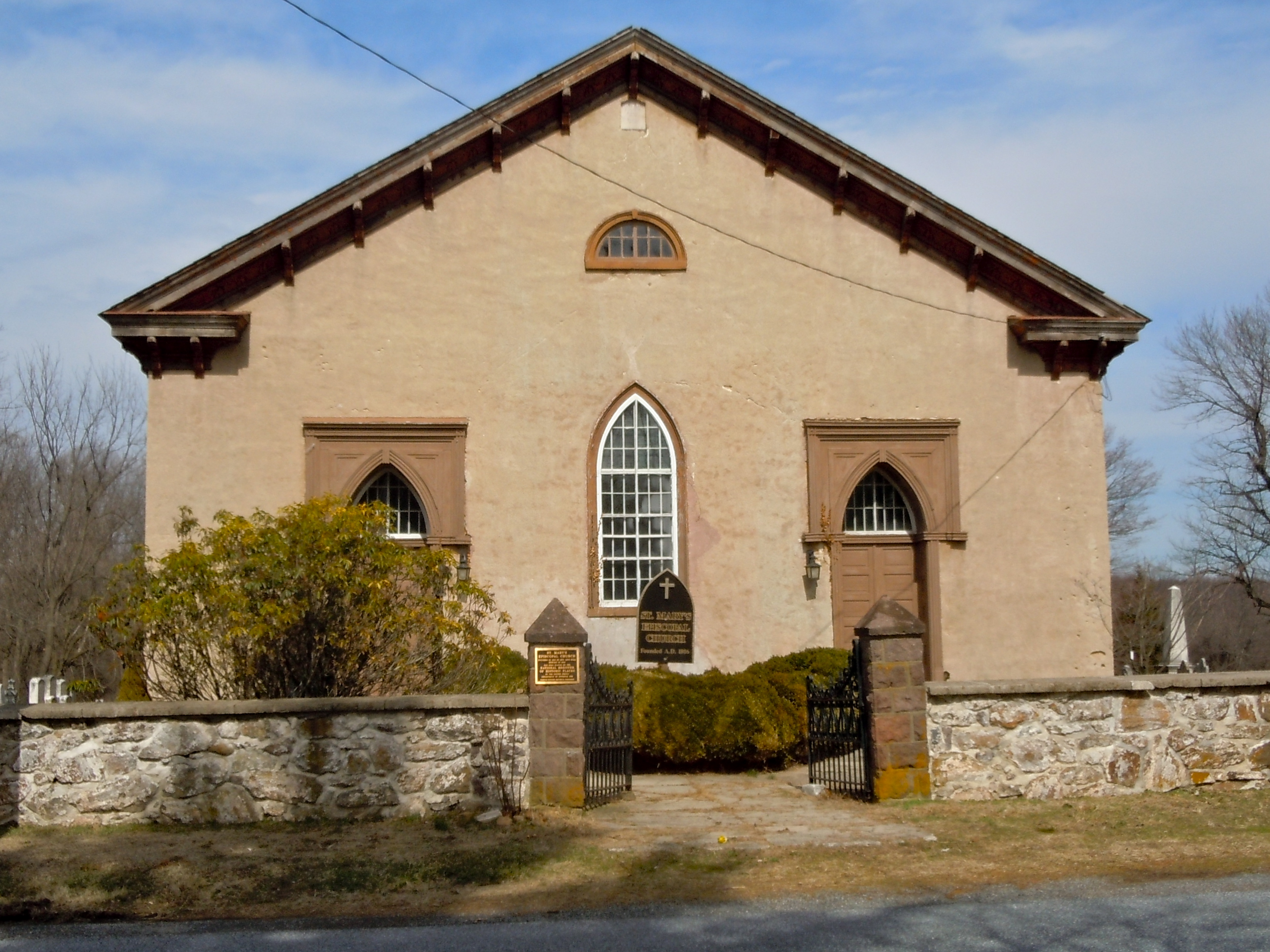

- Location within Pennsylvania Location within the United States
- Location: Warwick Rd., Warwick Township, Elverson, Pennsylvania
- Coordinates: 40°9′57″N 75°46′52″W
- Area: 1.3 acres (0.53 ha)
- Built: 1843
- Architectural style: Gothic Revival
- NRHP reference No.: 96000082
- Added to NRHP: February 16, 1996

St. Mary's Episcopal Church, also known as Old Saint Mary's Church, is a historic Episcopal church located on Warwick Road, Warwick Township in Elverson, Chester County, Pennsylvania. The church was built in 1843, and is a one-story, rectangular stuccoed fieldstone structure in the Gothic Revival style. It measures 50 feet wide and 70 feet deep. The church is surrounded by the parish cemetery, with burials dating to 1806.

Founded by the Rev. Levi Bull, DD, in 1805, the first church here was built in 1806. Julius F. Sachse, of the Historical Society of Pennsylvania, believed it to be the first church built in Pennsylvania after the American Revolution. A notable military officer Samuel Van Leer played an important role in the American Revolutionary War and is buried here. Dr. Bull continued to minister to the congregation here for almost 50 years. During Dr. Bull's tenure, in 1843, the original church was replaced by the present structure.

By the 1970s, the congregation had fallen to about ten attendees. However, the congregation was revived in the 1990s by financial support from the Brandywine Deanery and adopted elements of the charismatic movement under the rectorate of the Rev. John Maher.

It was added to the National Register of Historic Places in 1996.
