= Brower's Bridge =

- U.S. National Register of Historic Places
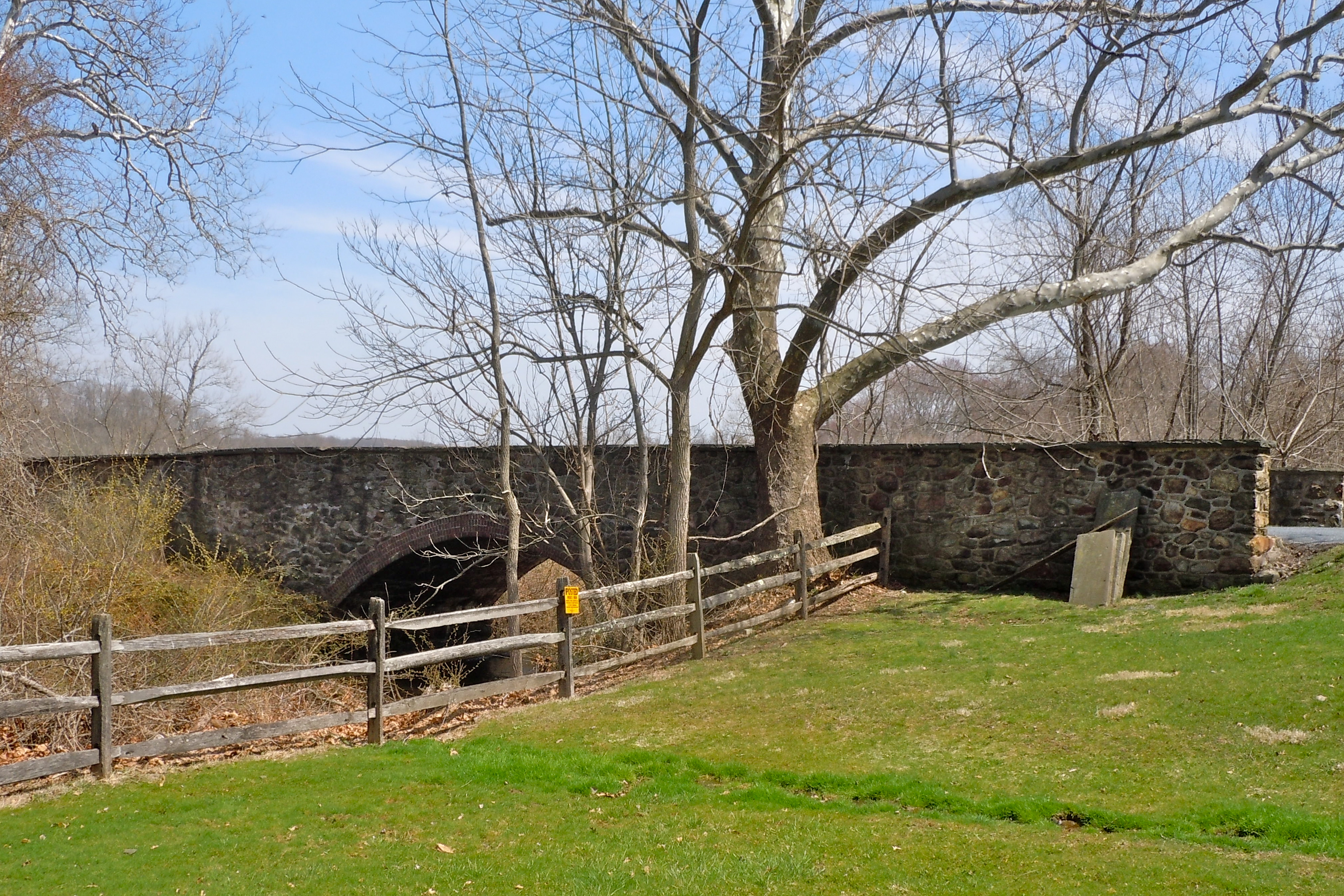
- Brower's Bridge, April 2011

- Location within Pennsylvania Location within the United States
- Location: Mansion Road over French Creek, East Nantmeal Township and Warwick Township, Pennsylvania
- Coordinates: 40°8′51″N 75°46′10″W
- Area: Less than one acre
- Built: 1904
- Built by: McCormick, P.J., & Sons
- MPS: Highway Bridges Owned by the Commonwealth of Pennsylvania, Department of Transportation TR
- NRHP reference No.: 88000754
- Added to NRHP: June 22, 1988

Brower's Bridge is a historic stone arch bridge located in East Nantmeal Township and Warwick Township, Chester County, Pennsylvania, US. It spans French Creek. It has an overall length of 100-foot (30 m) and a single span measuring 25-foot-long (7.6 m). The bridge was constructed in 1904 of coursed rubble stone with brick arch rings.

It was listed on the National Register of Historic Places in 1988.
