= Welkinweir =

Historic house and gardens in East Nantmeal Township, Pennsylvania, United States

- U.S. National Register of Historic Places
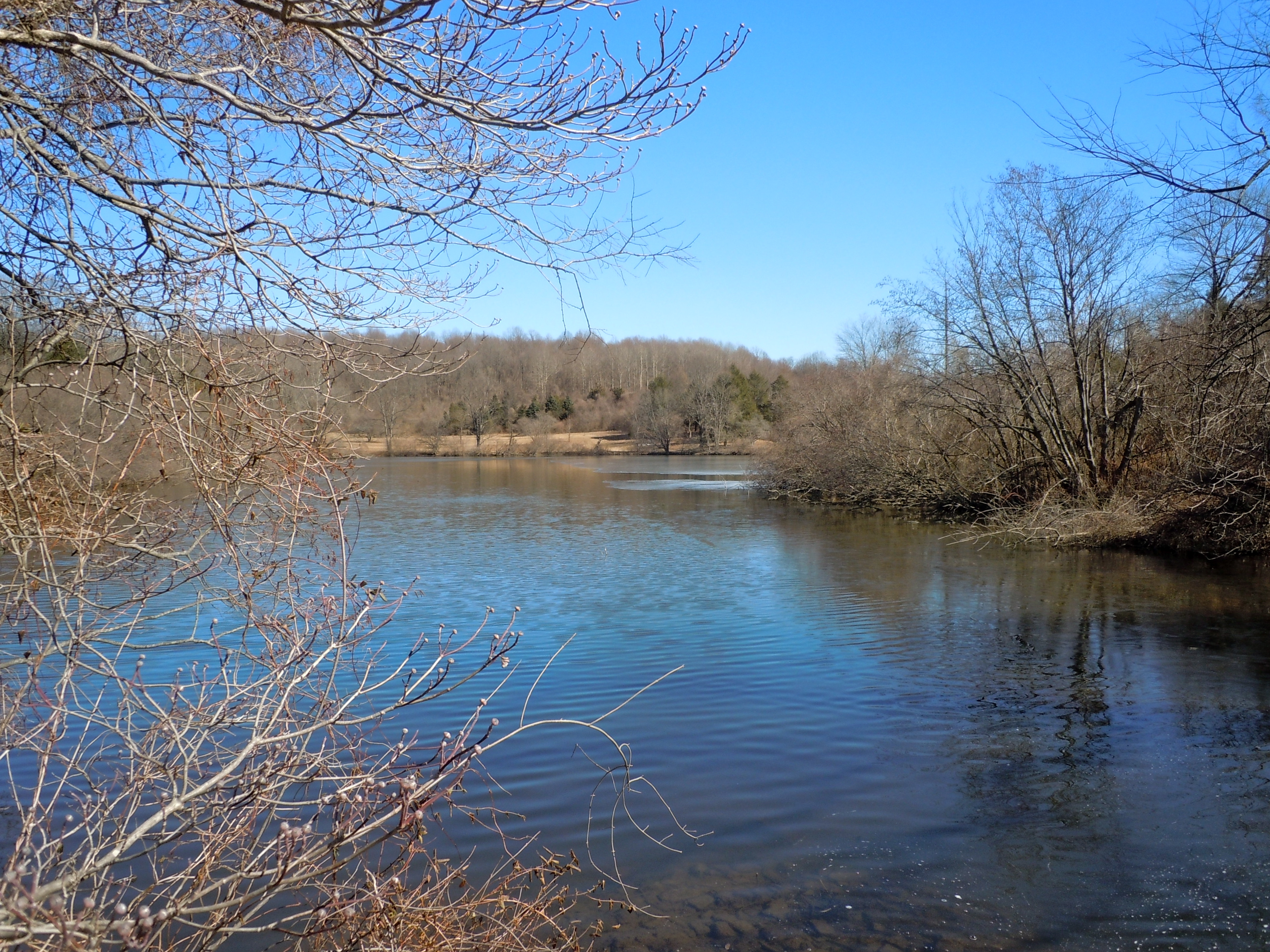
- The lake in early March

- Location within Pennsylvania Location within the United States
- Location: 1368 Prizer Rd., East Nantmeal Township, Pennsylvania
- Coordinates: 40°9′13″N 75°40′55″W
- Area: 162 acres (66 ha)
- Built: 1940
- Architect: Tobiessen, Fridtjof
- Architectural style: Colonial Revival
- Website: welkinweir.org
- NRHP reference No.: 01000953
- Added to NRHP: September 7, 2001

Welkinweir is a 197-acre (80 ha) nonprofit arboretum, garden, mansion, and conservation area that is located at 1368 Prizer Road, East Nantmeal Township, Pennsylvania, United States. Situated near Pottstown, it is part of the Hopewell Big Woods and is open to the public daily without charge.

== History and notable features ==
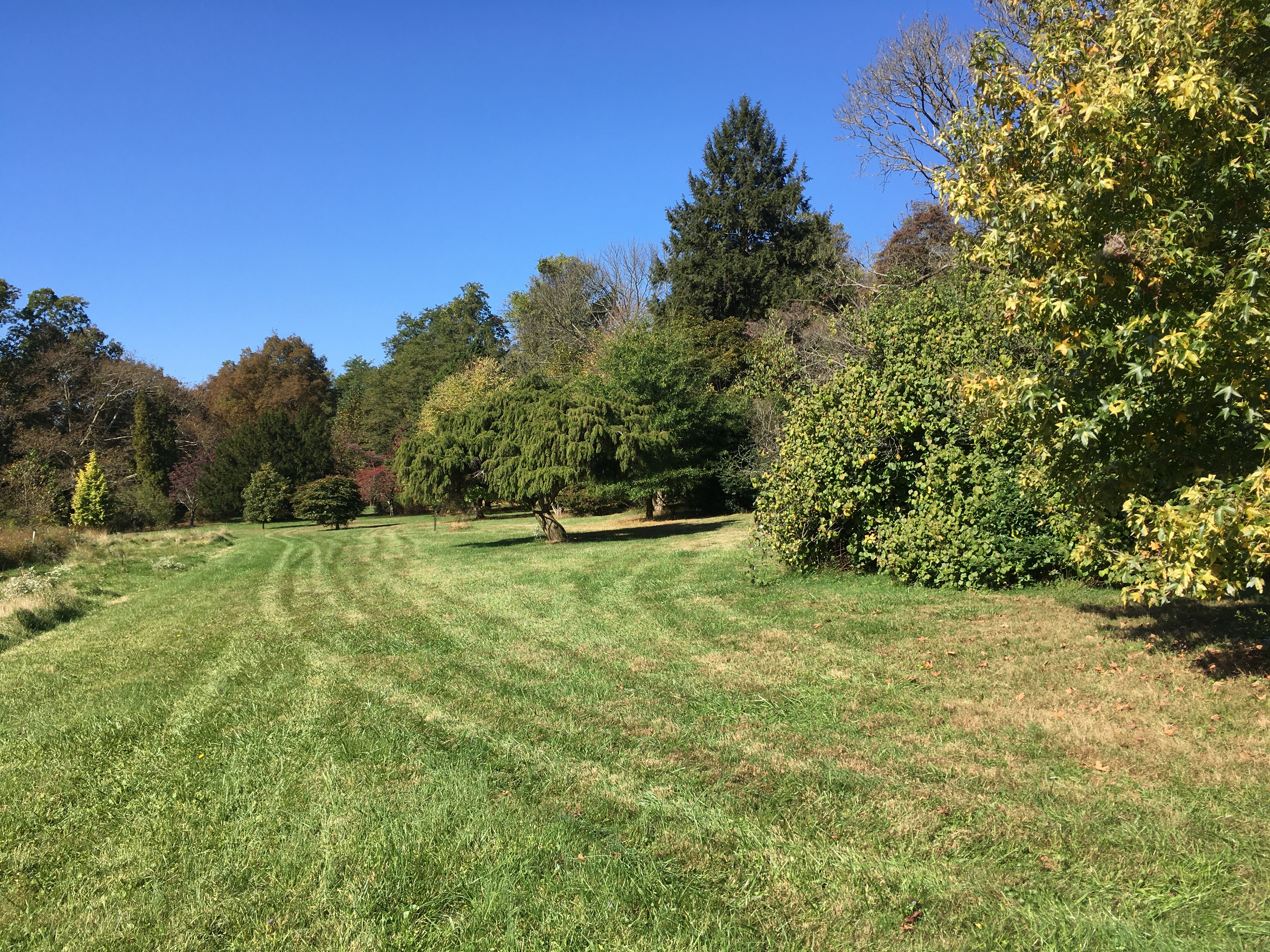
A meadow in the arboretum

Welkinweir was the home of Everett and Grace Rodebaugh, founding members of the conservation-minded Green Valleys Association. They bought the site during the 1930s and spent decades improving it. Their house was erected in 1940, built upon a much smaller house in two sections circa 1750 and 1830. The architect, Fridtjof Tobiessen, designed the 1940 mansion.

The property was placed into a conservation easement in 1976, donated to the association in 1997, and is now its headquarters and educational center. In 2001, the estate was listed on the National Register of Historic Places.

The arboretum includes cherry, dogwood, dwarf evergreens, franklinia, magnolia, Japanese maple, swamp and sugar maple, and sweetgum, as well as azaleas and rhododendrons.

== See also ==
- List of botanical gardens in the United States
