= Warwick Township, Chester County, Pennsylvania =

Township in Pennsylvania, US

Warwick Township
- Township
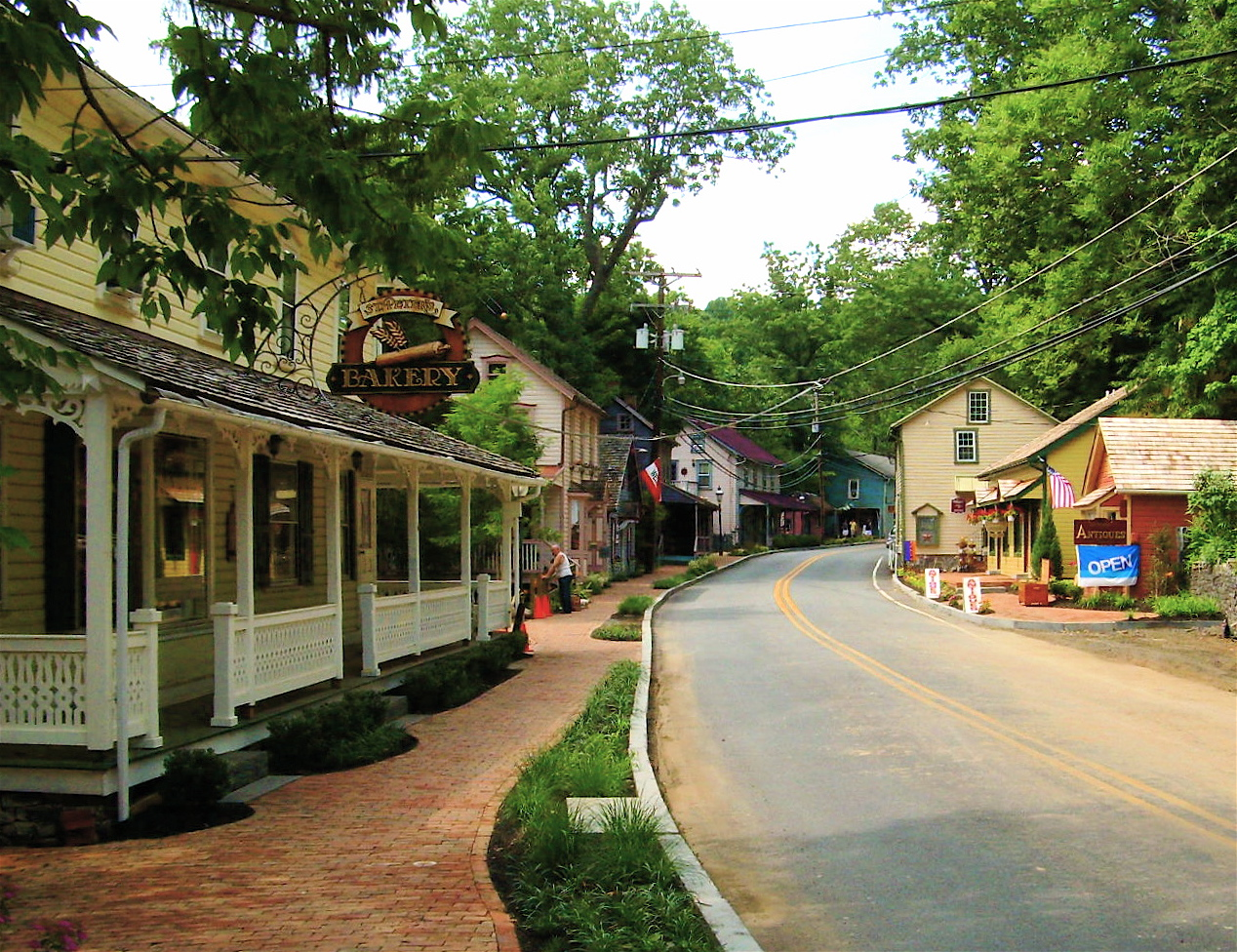
- St. Peter's Village

- Location of Warwick Township in Chester County and in Pennsylvania
- Coordinates: 40°11′16″N 75°44′56″W
- Country: United States
- State: Pennsylvania
- County: Chester

Area
  - Total: 18.90 sq mi (48.94 km^{2})
  - Land: 18.75 sq mi (48.56 km^{2})
  - Water: 0.15 sq mi (0.39 km^{2})
- Elevation: 692 ft (211 m)

Population (2010)
  - Total: 2,507
  - Estimate (2016): 2,540
  - Density: 135.5/sq mi (52.31/km^{2})
- Time zone: UTC-5 (EST)
  - Summer (DST): UTC-4 (EDT)
- Area code: 610
- FIPS code: 42-029-81160

Warwick Township is a township in Chester County, Pennsylvania, United States. The population was 2,507 at the 2010 census.

== History ==
The township's history includes several notable names such as William Penn, Benjamin Franklin, and George Washington. Warwick Township was also instrumental in the Revolutionary War. Some of the iron furnaces such as Van Leer Furnace produced cannons and shot for the war against the British. Today the land still remains undisturbed and the history is preserved.

The Hockley Mill Farm, Hopewell Furnace National Historic Site, John Knauer House and Mill, Lahr Farm, North Warwick Historic and Archeological District, Reading Furnace Historic District, Philip Rogers House, St. Mary's Episcopal Church, St. Peters Village Historic District, Warrenpoint, Warwick Mills, and Jacob Winings House and Clover Mill are listed on the National Register of Historic Places.

== Geography ==
According to the U.S. Census Bureau, the township has a total area of 19.2 square miles (50 km^{2}), all land. It is drained by the French Creek eastward into the Schuylkill River and areas near the border with Berks County are mountainous, exceeding 250 metres (825 feet) in places. Unincorporated communities in the township include Knauertown, Pine Swamp, St. Peters, Trythall and Warwick. Warwick Township is located in the Hopewell Big Woods. French Creek State Park is partially located in the township and also in Berks County.

=== Neighboring municipalities ===
- North Coventry Township (northeast)
- South Coventry Township (east)
- East Nantmeal Township (south)
- West Nantmeal Township (southwest)
- Union Township, Berks County (northwest)
- Robeson Township, Berks County (northwest)

== Recreation ==
Warwick County Park and portions of the Pennsylvania State Game Lands Number 43 are located in Warwick Township.

== Demographics ==
Historical population
Census	Pop.	Note	%±
1930	1,083		—
1940	1,125		3.9%
1950	1,144		1.7%
1960	1,436		25.5%
1970	1,667		16.1%
1980	2,350		41.0%
1990	2,575		9.6%
2000	2,556		−0.7%
2010	2,507		−1.9%
2020	2,590		3.3%

At the 2010 census, the township was 96.1% non-Hispanic White, 1.2% Black or African American, 0.2% Native American, 1.0% Asian, and 1.1% were two or more races. 1.6% of the population were of Hispanic or Latino ancestry.

As of the census of 2000, there were 2,556 people, 999 households, and 755 families living in the township. The population density was 133.2 inhabitants per square mile (51.4/km^{2}). There were 1,033 housing units at an average density of 53.8 per square mile (20.8/km^{2}). The racial makeup of the township was 98.16% White, 0.23% African American, 0.27% Native American, 0.47% Asian, 0.31% from other races, and 0.55% from two or more races. Hispanic or Latino of any race were 0.67% of the population.

There were 999 households, out of which 30.7% had children under the age of 18 living with them, 67.7% were married couples living together, 5.2% had a female householder with no husband present, and 24.4% were non-families. 20.9% of all households were made up of individuals, and 6.6% had someone living alone who was 65 years of age or older. The average household size was 2.56 and the average family size was 2.98.

In the township the population was spread out, with 23.4% under the age of 18, 5.8% from 18 to 24, 27.3% from 25 to 44, 31.7% from 45 to 64, and 11.9% who were 65 years of age or older. The median age was 41 years. For every 100 females, there were 105.3 males. For every 100 females age 18 and over, there were 102.0 males.

The median income for a household in the township was $56,771, and the median income for a family was $70,625. Males had a median income of $46,422 versus $31,429 for females. The per capita income for the township was $26,547. About 3.6% of families and 6.1% of the population were below the poverty line, including 11.0% of those under age 18 and 3.0% of those age 65 or over.

== Education ==
Warwick Township is in the Owen J. Roberts School District. Owen J. Roberts High School is the zoned comprehensive high school.

== Transportation ==
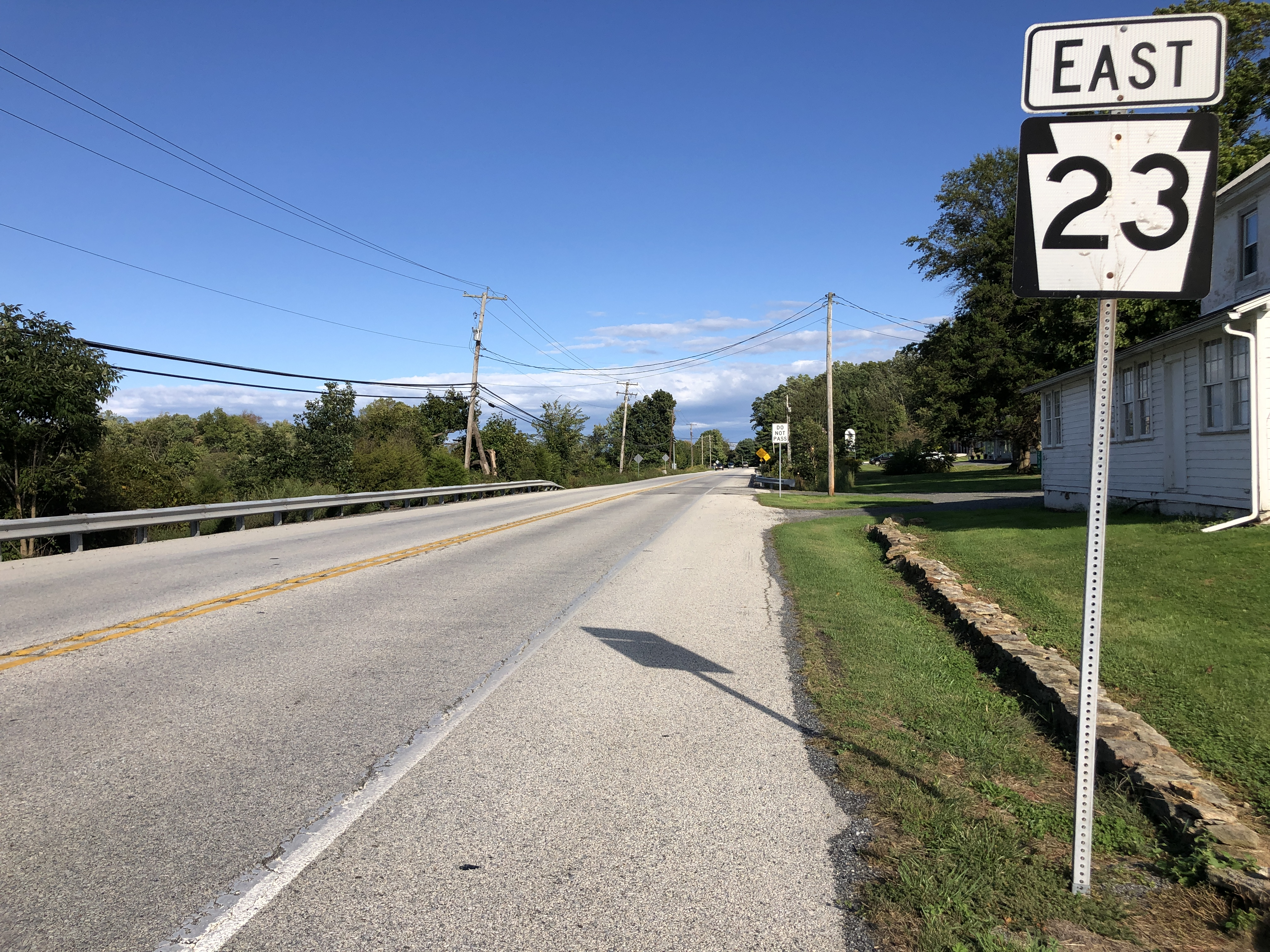
PA 23 eastbound in Warwick Township

As of 2018, there were 50.85 miles (81.84 km) of public roads in Warwick Township, of which 22.40 miles (36.05 km) were maintained by the Pennsylvania Department of Transportation (PennDOT) and 28.45 miles (45.79 km) were maintained by the township.

Pennsylvania Route 23 and Pennsylvania Route 345 are the numbered roads serving the township. PA 23 follows Ridge Road along an east–west alignment across the southern portion of the township. PA 345 follows Bulltown Road, Warwick Road and Pine Swamp Road along a north–south alignment across the western part of the township.
