= North Warwick Historic and Archeological District =

Historic district in Pennsylvania, United States

- U.S. National Register of Historic Places
- U.S. Historic district
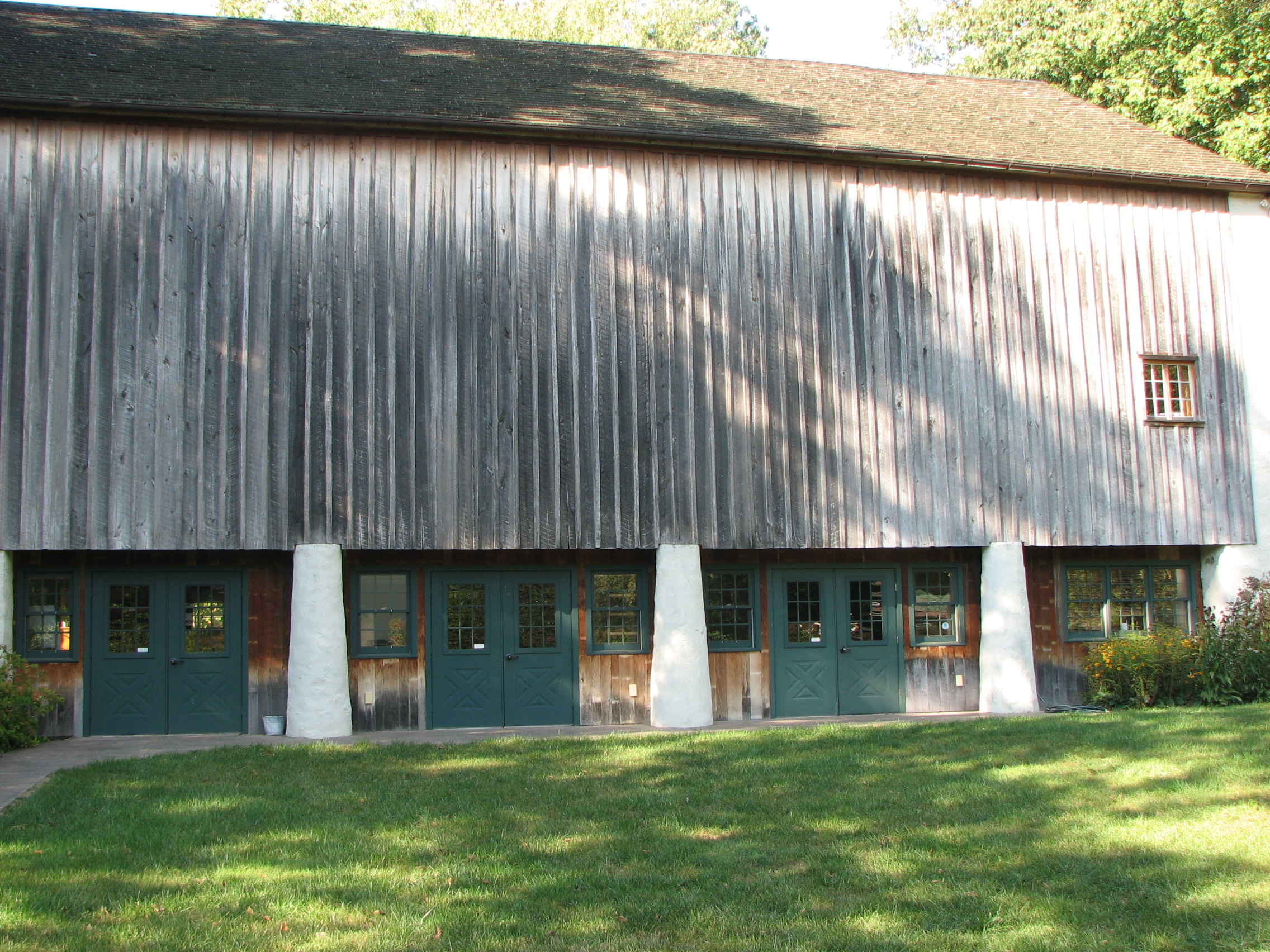
- Crow's Nest Visitor Center, North Warwick Historic and Archeological District, September 2010

- Location within Pennsylvania Location within the United States
- Location: Pennsylvania Route 345 and Harmonyville, Bethesda, Hopewell, Piersol, Trythall, and Northside Roads, Warwick Township, Pennsylvania
- Coordinates: 40°11′18″N 75°46′08″W
- Area: 1,848.5 acres (748.1 ha)
- Architectural style: Georgian
- NRHP reference No.: 95000135
- Added to NRHP: February 24, 1995

The North Warwick Historic and Archeological District is a national historic district that is located in Warwick Township, Chester County, Pennsylvania.

It was added to the National Register of Historic Places in 1995.

== History and notable features ==
This district is adjacent to the Hopewell Furnace National Historic Site, and encompasses fifty-five contributing buildings, thirty-nine contributing archaeological sites, thirteen contributing structures, and one contributing object in a mineral-rich, well-forested area. Archaeological remains document prehistoric habitation dating back to 3000 BC. The contributing buildings include log and fieldstone buildings, many of which date to the eighteenth and nineteenth centuries. They include two well designed Georgian-style dwellings that date to 1817 and 1822. Also located in the district are the Bethesda Church, or Lloyd's Meeting House (1782), the Pine Swamp Evangelical Church (1894), and the Monocacy Schoolhouse (1884).

It was added to the National Register of Historic Places in 1995.
