= Philip Rogers House =

Historic house in Pennsylvania, United States

- U.S. National Register of Historic Places
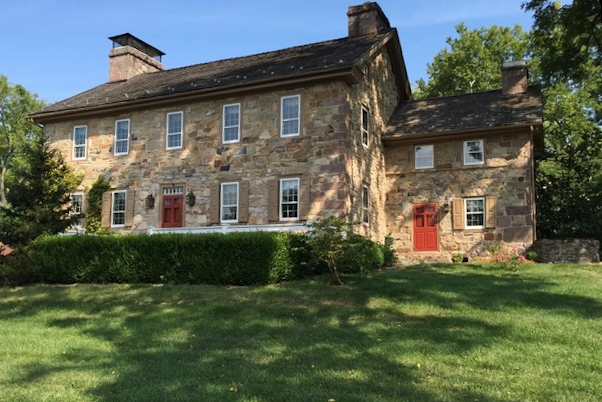
- Philip Rogers House, April 2011

- Location within Pennsylvania Location within the United States
- Location: Ridge Road, Warwick Township, Pennsylvania
- Coordinates: 40°10′29″N 75°43′11″W
- Area: less than one acre
- Built: c. 1750
- NRHP reference No.: 73001617
- Added to NRHP: May 25, 1973

Philip Rogers House, also known as Penn Wick, is a historic home located in Warwick Township, Chester County, Pennsylvania. It was built about 1750, and is a 2 1/2-story, five-bay-by-two-bay, random fieldstone dwelling. It has a gable roof with gable end chimneys. A 2 1/2-story kitchen wing was added before 1825.

It was added to the National Register of Historic Places in 1973.
