= Jacob Winings House and Clover Mill =

Historic house in Pennsylvania, United States

- U.S. National Register of Historic Places
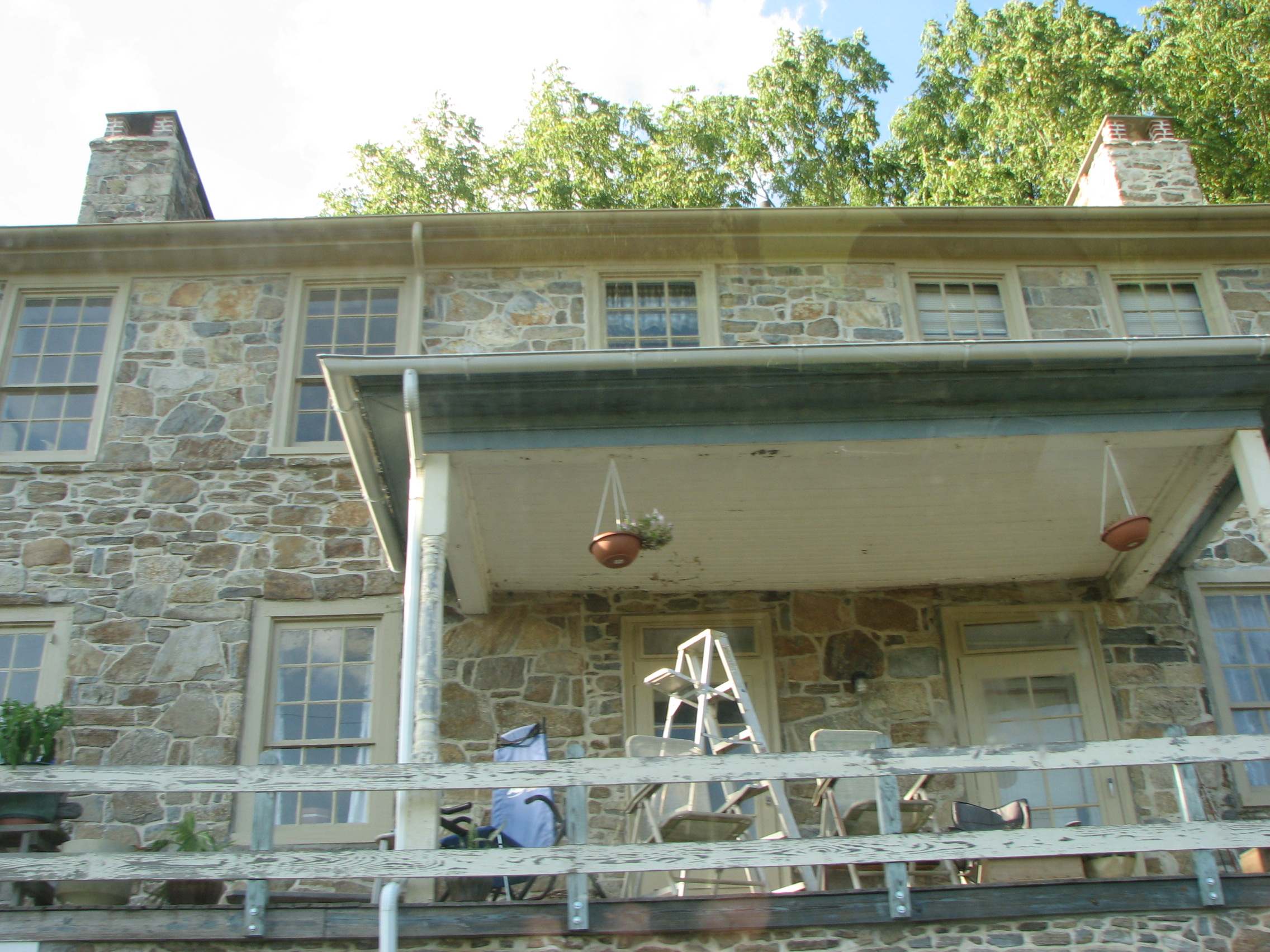
- Jacob Winings House Front, September 2010

- Location within Pennsylvania Location within the United States
- Location: Southwest of Phoenixville on James Mill Road, Warwick Township, Pennsylvania
- Coordinates: 40°9′1″N 75°45′52″W
- Area: 1.7 acres (0.69 ha)
- Built: c. 1796
- NRHP reference No.: 79002203
- Added to NRHP: August 17, 1979

The Jacob Winings House and Clover Mill is an historic clover mill and home that are located in Warwick Township, Chester County, Pennsylvania, United States.

It was added to the National Register of Historic Places in 1979.

== History and architectural features ==
The house was built by 1796, and is a 2 1/2-story, random, fieldstone structure, six bays wide by two bays deep. It has a gable roof and a porch added in the late nineteenth century. The mill is a small, 2 1/2-story, banked stone structure with a gable roof.
