= Hockley Mill Farm =

Historic house in Pennsylvania, United States

- U.S. National Register of Historic Places
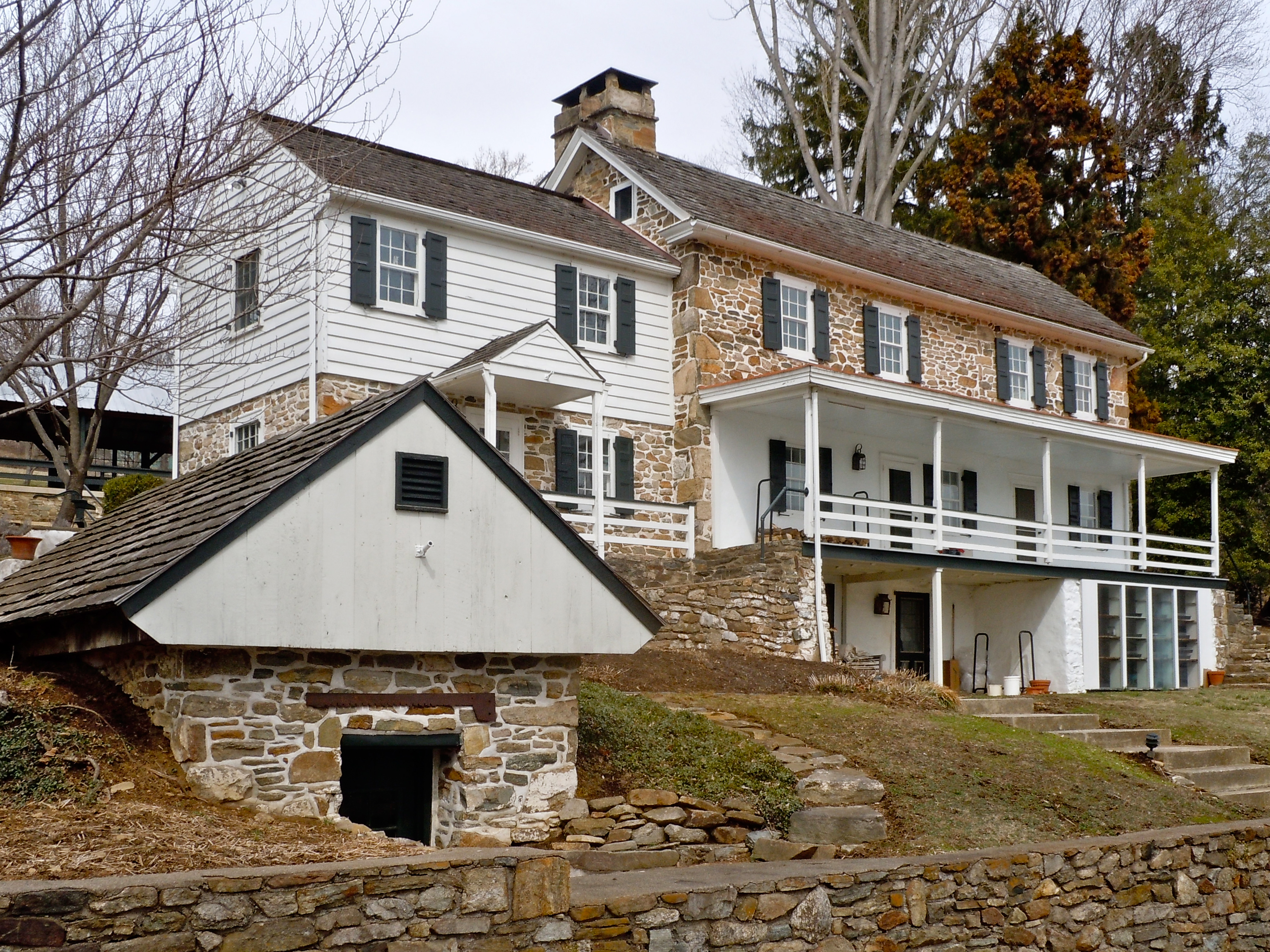
- Hockley Mill Farm, March 2011

- Location within Pennsylvania Location within the United States
- Location: Warwick Furnace Rd., SE of Knauertown, Warwick Township, Pennsylvania
- Coordinates: 40°09′15″N 75°42′59″W
- Area: 15.7 acres (6.4 ha)
- Built: c. 1735, 1780, 1805, c. 1840
- Built by: Knauer, Christopher
- NRHP reference No.: 90001921
- Added to NRHP: December 18, 1990

The Hockley Mill Farm, also known as Mt. Pleasant Mills and Frank Knauer Mill, is an historic home and grist mill which is located in Warwick Township, Chester County, Pennsylvania.

It was added to the National Register of Historic Places in 1990.

== History and architectural features ==
This farm has three contributing buildings and one contributing structure. They are the miller's house, a one-and-one-half-story, stone-and-frame grist mill, which was erected in 1805, a stone-and-frame bank barn, which was built circa 1840 and the head and tail races. The house is a two-and-one-half-story, five-bay, banked, fieldstone dwelling with a gable roof. The foundation in the western section was built sometime around 1725 to support a log dwelling. It was expanded with the present eastern section in 1735; the log section was replaced circa 1780. A two-story, two-bay annex was built between 1935 and 1940, and was expanded in 1965. A shed-roofed addition was built to the north in 1990.
