= Warrenpoint (William Branson House) =

Historic house in Pennsylvania, United States

- U.S. National Register of Historic Places
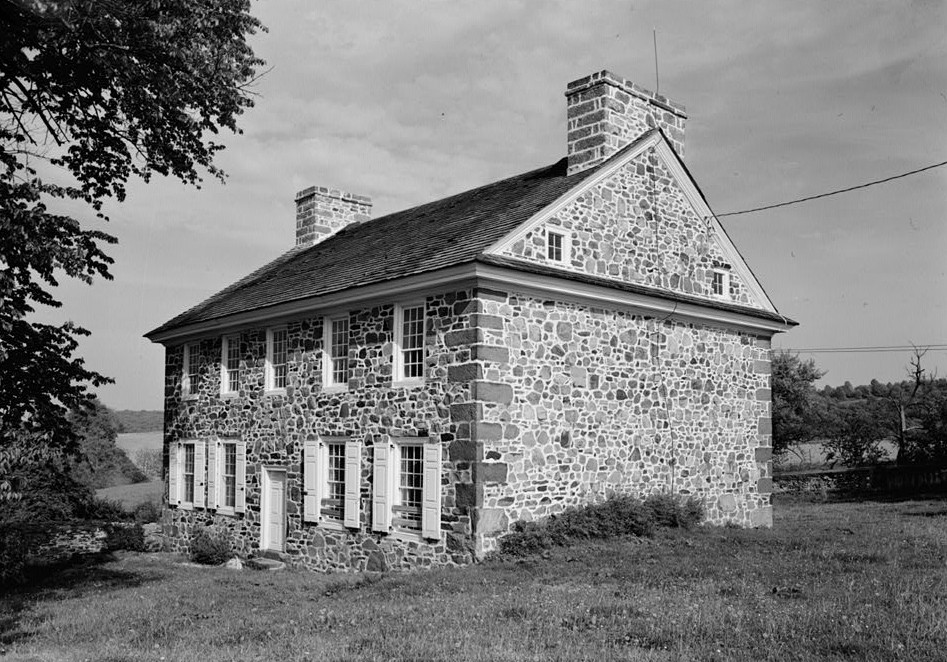
- William Branson House

- Location within Pennsylvania Location within the United States
- Nearest city: Knauertown, Pennsylvania
- Coordinates: 40°9′52″N 75°44′37″W
- Built: 1756
- Architect: Branson, William
- Architectural style: Georgian
- NRHP reference No.: 75001630
- Added to NRHP: November 11, 1975

Warrenpoint (also known as William Branson House) is an historic home located in Knauertown, Pennsylvania, in Chester County. The house was built in 1756 in the Georgian Colonial style by William Branson. Branson was recorded as Samuel Nutts partner who both owned Reading Furnace and Warwick Furnace Farms. William Branson and his Reading property are also associated with the Franklin Stove. William Branson's grandson Samuel Van Leer would play an important role in the American Revolutionary War and would take over the family business.

It was added to the National Register of Historic Places on November 11, 1975.

== History ==
William Branson, the original owner of the house was a leader in the early iron industry. The house was constructed of stone in the German Colonial tradition but adapted to the Georgian style. The house was photographed by Ned Goode of the Historic American Buildings Survey in 1960. Branson's grandson owned the nearby Reading Furnace Farms, which is associated with the introduction of the Franklin Stove, and the retreat of George Washington's army following its defeat at the Battle of Brandywine.

== See also ==
- Reading Furnace Historic District
- Knauertown, Pennsylvania
- List of Registered Historic Places in Chester County, Pennsylvania
