= Warwick Mills =

- U.S. National Register of Historic Places
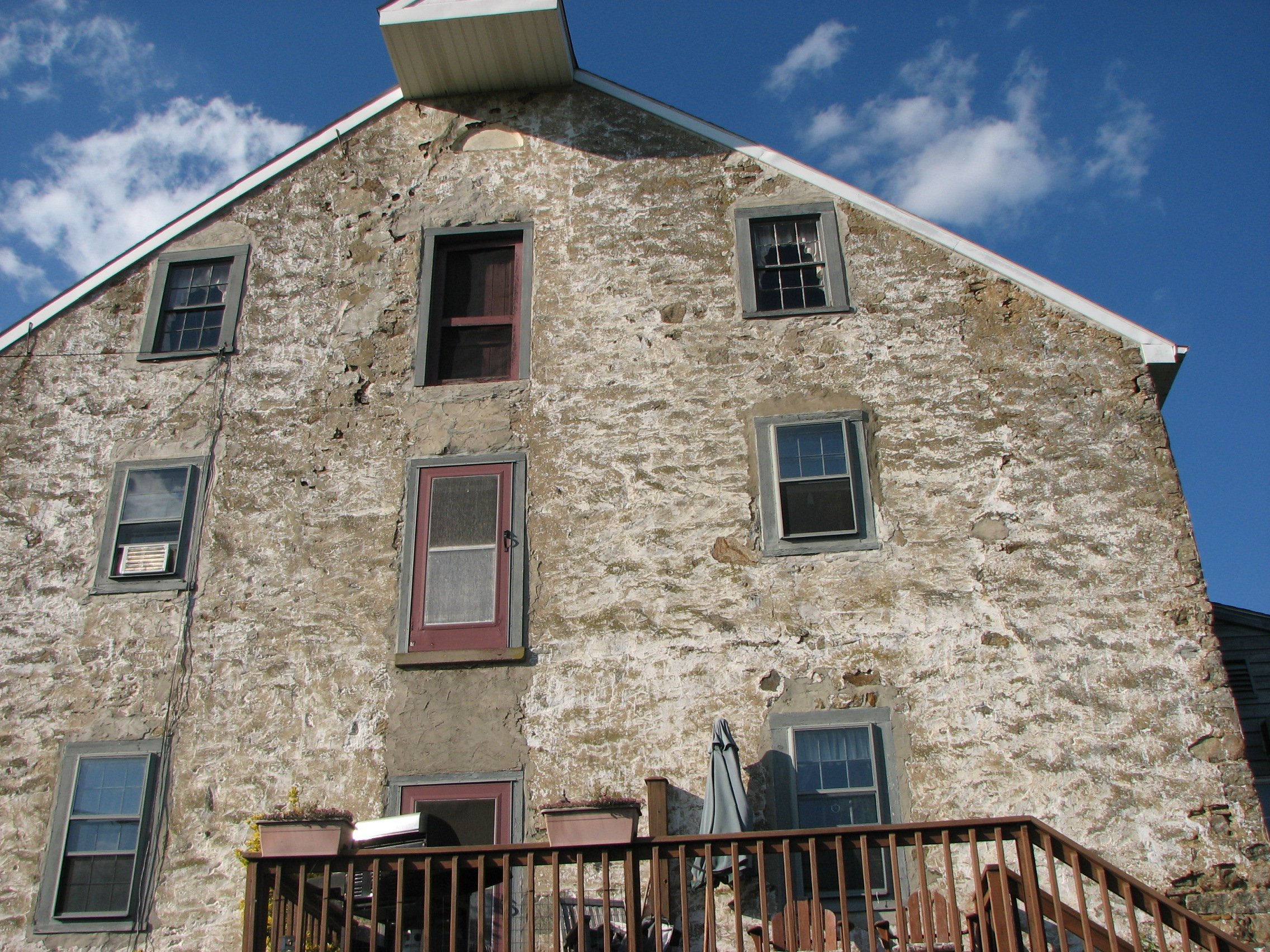
- Warwick Mills, September 2010

- Location within Pennsylvania Location within the United States
- Location: East of Elverson off Pennsylvania Route 23 on James Mills Road, Warwick Township, Pennsylvania
- Coordinates: 40°8′54″N 75°45′19″W
- Area: 7.3 acres (3.0 ha)
- Built: c. 1784
- NRHP reference No.: 74001769
- Added to NRHP: December 30, 1974

There are two historic mills in the United States that have been named Warwick Mills. The older of the two is located in the Commonwealth of Pennsylvania and is no longer running. The other is located in New Hampshire and is still manufacturing today.

It was added to the National Register of Historic Places in 1974.

== History and notable features ==
The older "Warwick Mills", also known as James Mills with Jacob Hager House and Tenant House, is an historic grist mill complex that is located in Warwick Township, Chester County, Pennsylvania. The mill was built circa 1784, and is a three- to four-story, banked fieldstone structure. The manor house was built before 1828, and is a 2 1/2-story, four-bay by two-bay, random fieldstone dwelling. The tenant house was also built before 1828, and is a 2 1/2-story, four-bay by two-bay, stuccoed stone dwelling with a shed-roofed porch and a 1 1/2-story addition. The mill remained in operation until 1968.

The Warwick Mills in New Ipswich, New Hampshire is the site of the oldest textile mill in the state. Built circa 1807, it burned down two times and was rebuilt a third time using brick; that third iteration is the building seen today. The brick for the building was forged on site and was finished in 1864, with signatures on the beams by craftsmen as far south as Baltimore. It is still a running textile mill.
