= Knauertown, Pennsylvania =

Unincorporated community in Pennsylvania, US

- Unincorporated community
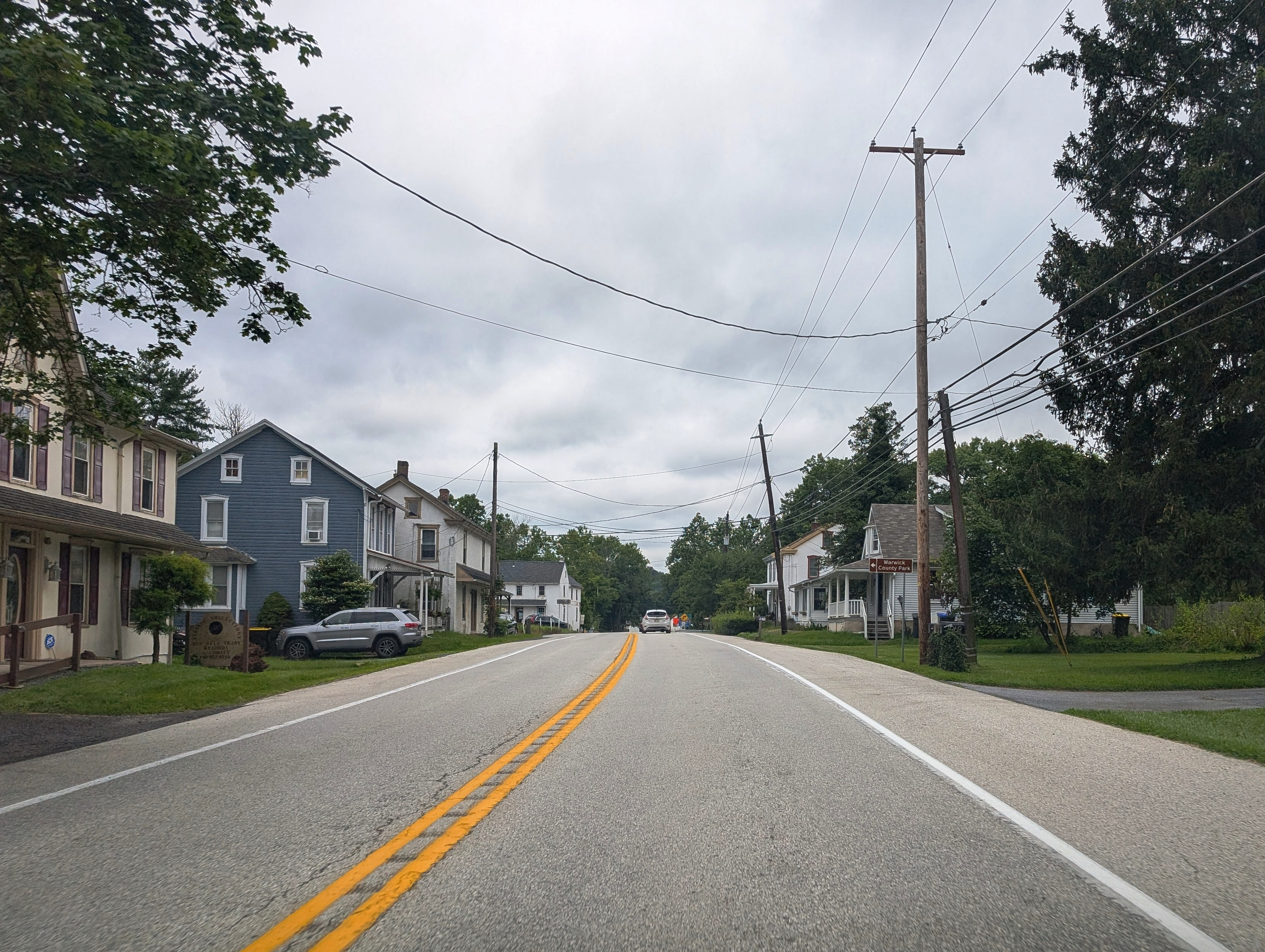
- Westbound PA 23 in Knauertown

- Location of Knauertown in Pennsylvania Knauertown, Pennsylvania (the United States)
- Coordinates: 40°10′17″N 75°43′37″W
- Country: United States
- State: Pennsylvania
- County: Chester
- Township: Warwick
- Elevation: 308 ft (94 m)
- Time zone: UTC-5 (EST)
  - Summer (DST): UTC-4 (EDT)
- ZIP Code: 19520/19465
- Area code: 610

Knauertown is a village in Warwick Township, Chester County, Pennsylvania, United States. Located on Pennsylvania Route 23, the land in and around present-day Knauertown was bought and settled by Johann Christopher Knauer in 1753. Just east of Knauertown on Route 23 is the Seven Day Graveyard, which contains the graves of Knauer and many of his descendants. Nearby is Saint Peter's Village, which was also owned by the Knauer family.

Knauertown borders East Nantmeal via Iron Bridge. Iron Bridge is a notable landmark for its use as an Internet meme related to the 2022 Philadelphia Phillies' World Series appearance.
