= Reading Furnace Historic District =

Historic district in Pennsylvania, United States

- U.S. National Register of Historic Places
- U.S. Historic district
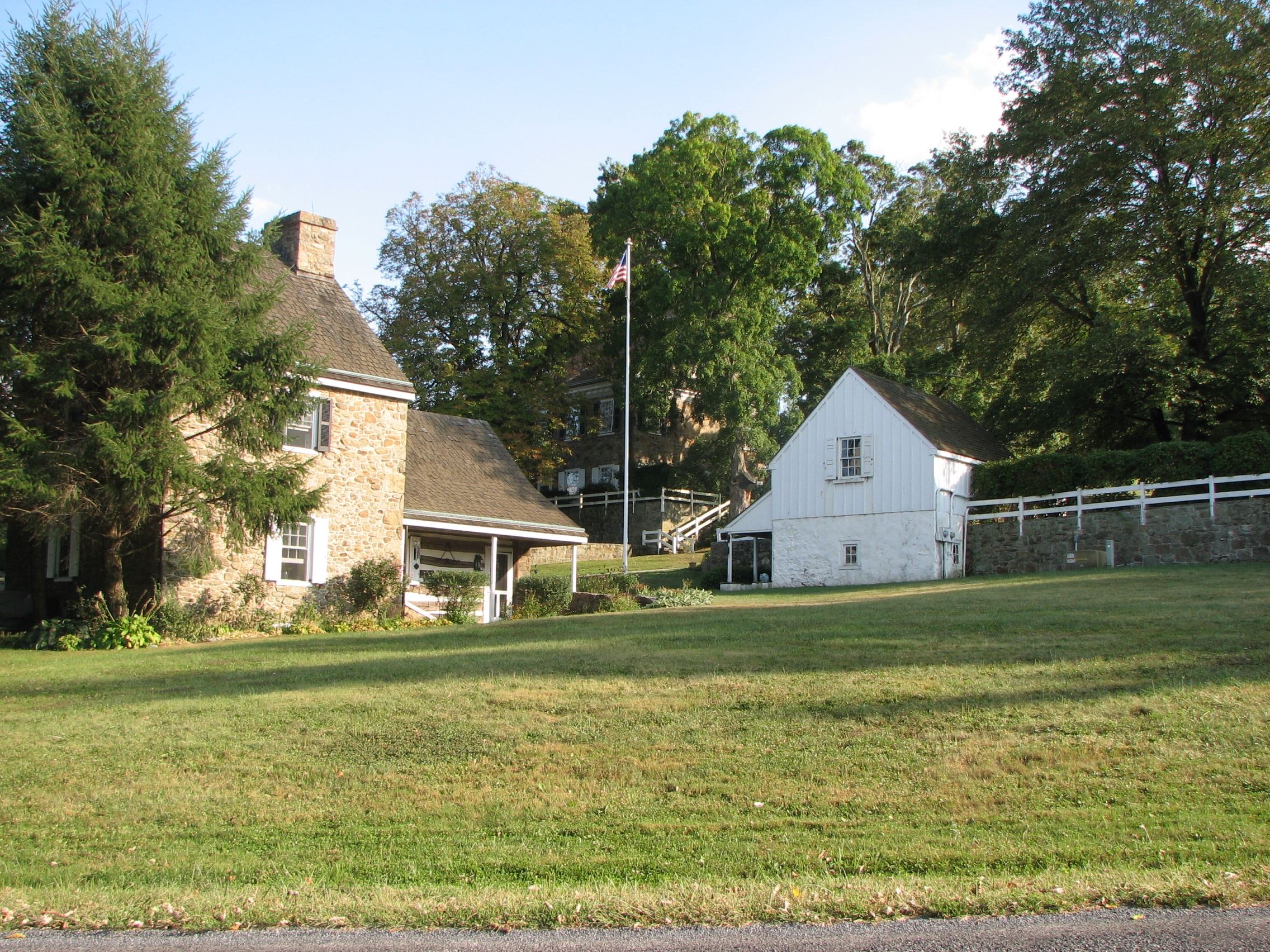
- Reading Furnace and Farm buildings, September 2010

- Location within Pennsylvania Location within the United States
- Location: Mansion Road, Warwick Township and East Nantmeal Township, Pennsylvania
- Coordinates: 40°08′49″N 75°46′08″W
- Area: 13.3 acres (5.4 ha)
- Built: 1744
- Built by: Drexel, Gottlieb
- Architect: Okie, Richardson Brognard
- NRHP reference No.: 87000797
- Added to NRHP: July 30, 1987

The Reading Furnace Historic District is a national historic district that is located in Warwick Township and East Nantmeal Township, Chester County, Pennsylvania.

It was added to the National Register of Historic Places in 1987.

== History and architectural features ==
The Reading Furnace was built in 1736 by iron pioneer William Branson, then later owned by his grandson, a prominent Iron works owner and American Revolutionary War officer, Samuel Van Leer. Branson also owned the nearby historical Warrenpoint House

The furnace was a center of colonial iron making and is associated with the introduction of the Franklin Stove, and the retreat of George Washington's army following its defeat at the Battle of Brandywine, where they came for musket repairs. Nathanael Greene's company and Washington were both recorded encamping here.

The location is listed as the site of one of George Washington's temporary headquarters. This furnace also supplied cannons and cannonballs for the Revolutionary Army.

The district includes seven contributing buildings, two contributing sites, and one contributing structure with a former iron furnace and farm. The buildings are the mansion house, the tenant house, a barn, a large shed, and three outbuildings. The stone mansion was built in three sections between 1744 and 1936. The latest addition was completed under the direction of R. Brognard Okie. The contributing sites are the remains of an eighteenth-century dam and the foundation of the 1736 Reading Furnace. The contributing structure is a stone arch bridge (1904).

== Gallery ==
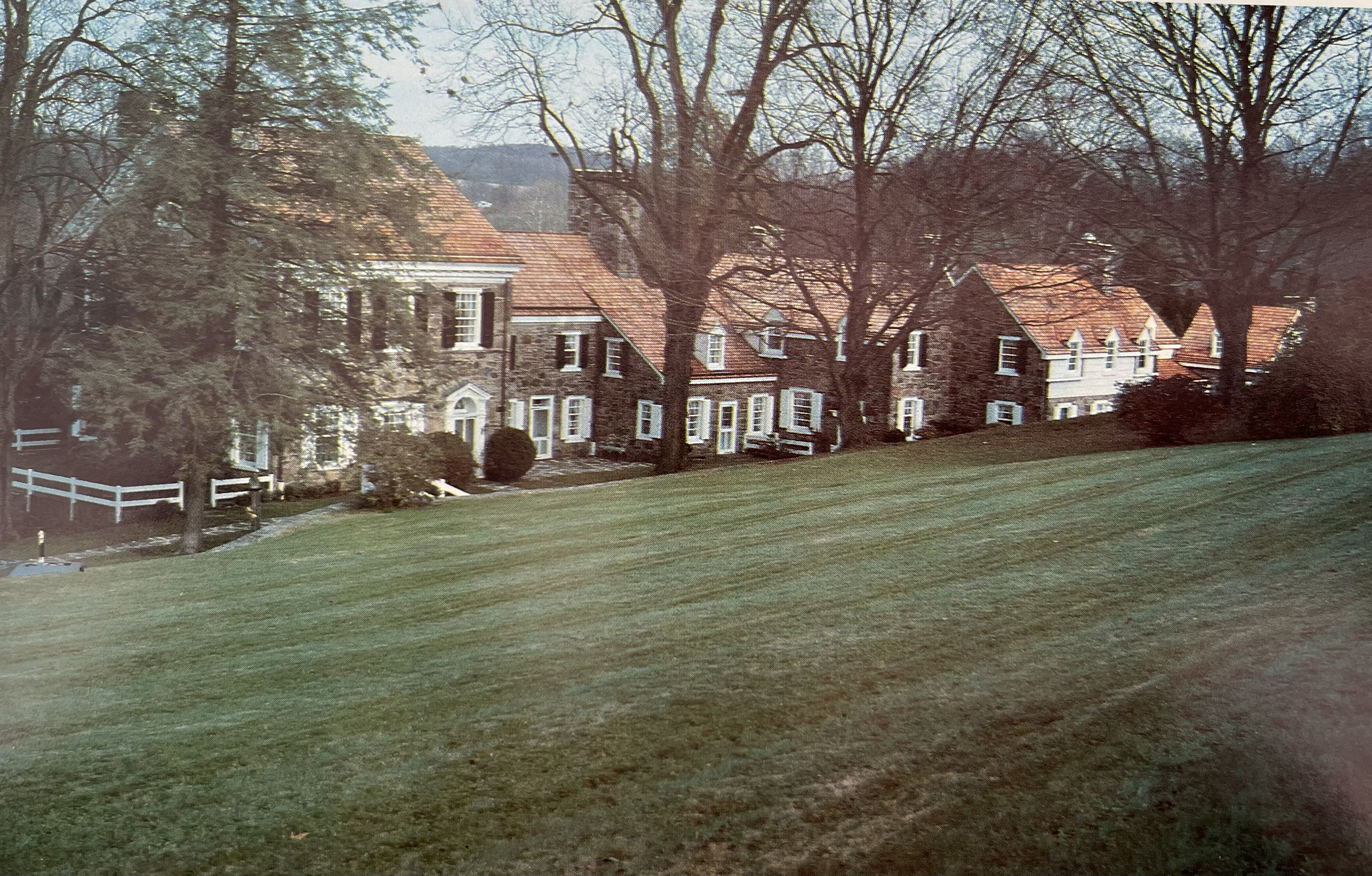
Reading Mansion

== See also ==
- National Register of Historic Places listings in northern Chester County, Pennsylvania
- List of Washington's Headquarters during the Revolutionary War
