= Owen J. Roberts High School =

School in Pennsylvania, United States

Location
- 981 Ridge Rd, Pottstown, Pennsylvania, 19465; United States
- 40.1767°N 75.6570°W

Information
- Type: Public high school
- Motto: "Inspiring Excellence. Inspired Students”
- Opened: 1957
- School district: Owen J. Roberts School District
- Superintendent: Dr. Will Stout
- Principal: Steven Kollar
- Staff: 122.60 (FTE)
- Grades: 9-12
- Enrollment: 1,836 (2023-2024)
- Student to teacher ratio: 14.98
- Campus type: Rural/suburban
- Colors: Red and white
- Team name: Wildcats
- Website: ojrhs.ojrsd.com

Owen J. Roberts High School is a high school in the Owen J. Roberts School District. It is located in Bucktown, in South Coventry Township, Chester County, Pennsylvania, in the Philadelphia metropolitan area. It has a Pottstown postal address.

It resides at the intersection of Pennsylvania Route 100 and Pennsylvania Route 23, serving northern Chester County.

== History ==
The current high school unit was built in 1957, though through the years many renovations have been done to accommodate for an increasing class size, including the construction of a new wing and a neighboring middle school.

The school is named after Owen J. Roberts (1875-1955), Associate Justice of the U.S. Supreme Court, who purchased the Strickland-Roberts Homestead in West Vincent Township in 1927, and died there in 1955.

== Attendance boundary ==
The boundary of the school district (and therefore that of the high school) includes East Coventry Township, East Nantmeal Township, East Vincent Township, North Coventry Township (including Kenilworth and South Pottstown), South Coventry Township (including Pughtown), Warwick Township, and West Vincent Township.

== Notable alumni ==
- Denis Chen, former professional soccer player and professor
- Daryl Hall, co-founder and principal lead vocalist, Hall & Oates
- Jerry Ostroski, former professional football player
- Aaron Squires, Division III soccer champion and field goal record holder
- Don Strock, former professional football player
