= South Pottstown, Pennsylvania =

Unincorporated community in Pennsylvania, US

South Pottstown
- Census-designated place
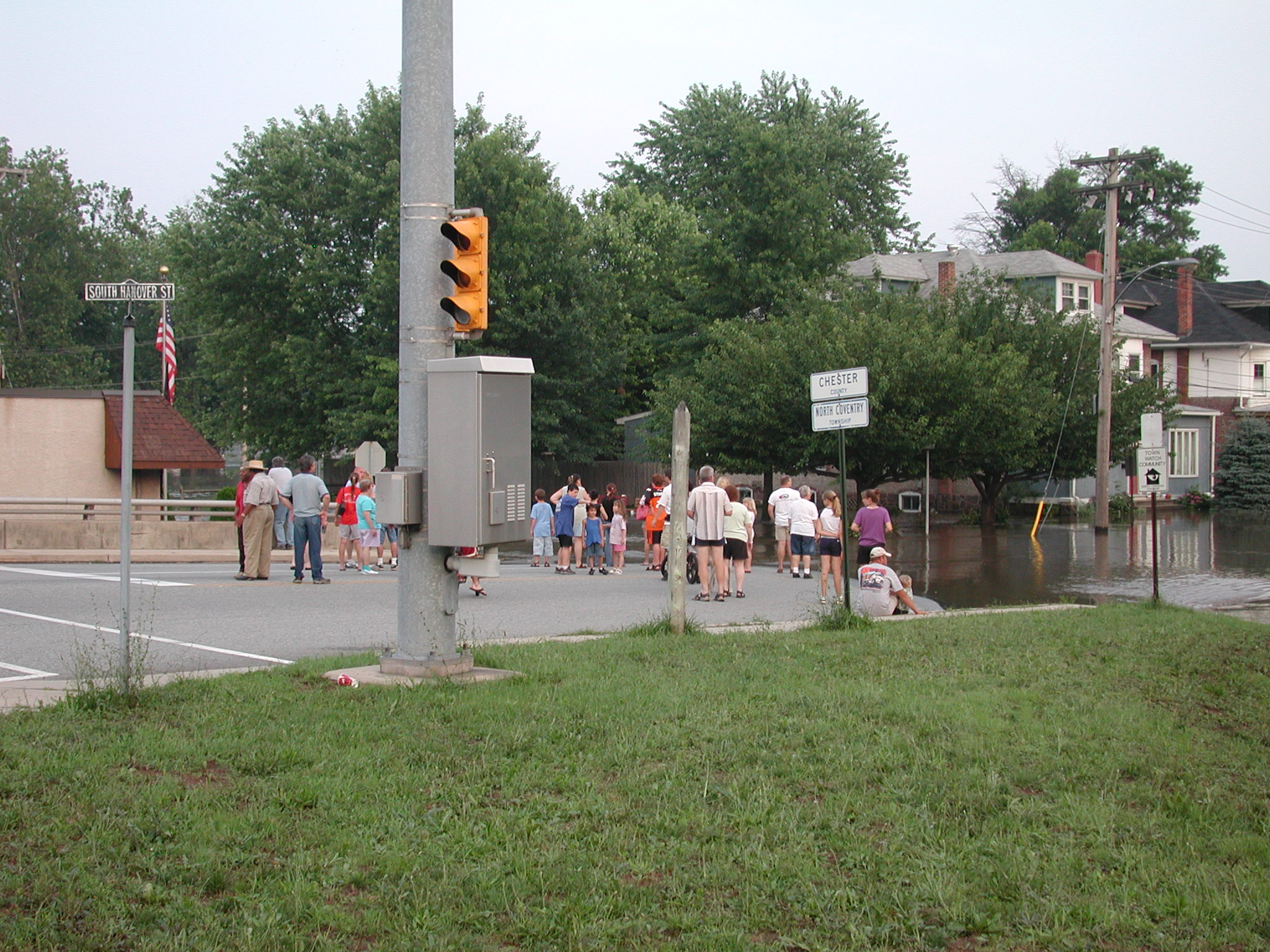
- Flooding in South Pottstown

- Location in Chester County and the U.S. state of Pennsylvania.
- Coordinates: 40°14′11″N 75°39′26″W
- Country: United States
- State: Pennsylvania
- County: Chester
- Township: North Coventry

Area
  - Total: 1.6 sq mi (4.1 km^{2})
  - Land: 1.5 sq mi (3.9 km^{2})
  - Water: 0.1 sq mi (0.26 km^{2})
- Elevation: 141 ft (43 m)

Population (2010)
  - Total: 2,081
  - Density: 1,400/sq mi (540/km^{2})
- Time zone: UTC-5 (EST)
  - Summer (DST): UTC-4 (EDT)
- ZIP code: 19465
- Area codes: 610, 484, & 835

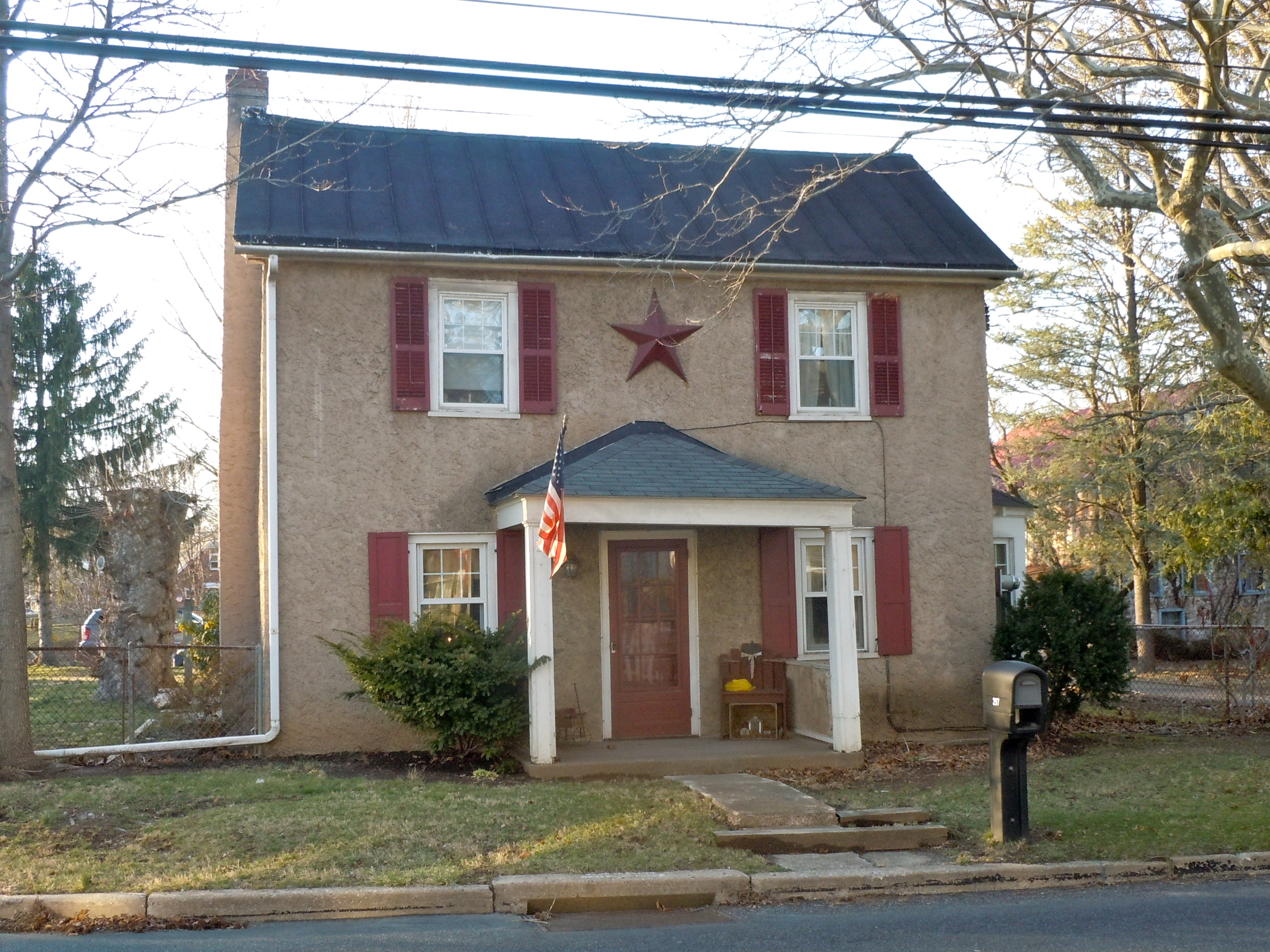
Pottstown Landing Historic District is located on the west side of Route 100 in the South Pottstown CDP

South Pottstown is a community in North Coventry Township, Chester County in the U.S. state of Pennsylvania. It is defined by the U.S. Census Bureau as a census-designated place (CDP) for statistical purposes and does not have any legal status as a separately incorporated municipality. It is a part of the Pottstown urban area. The population was 2,081 at the 2010 census.

== Geography ==
South Pottstown is located at 40°14′11″N 75°39′26″W (40.236443, -75.657220).

According to the United States Census Bureau, the CDP has a total area of 1.6 square miles (4.1 km^{2}), of which 1.5 square miles (3.9 km^{2}) is land and 0.1 square miles (0.26 km^{2}), or 4.32%, is water.

South Pottstown is served by east-to-west US 422 and PA 724 as well as north-to-south PA 100 and South Hanover Street. The Shoppes at Coventry is a regional shopping center in South Pottstown, which faces Pottstown across the Schuylkill River on the northern boundary. Its hardiness zone is 7a and the climate is borderline Cfa/Dfa (humid subtropical/hot summer humid continental.) It is served by the Pottstown post office and telephone exchange.

== Demographics ==
At the 2000 census there were 2,135 people, 997 households, and 528 families living in the CDP. The population density was 1,373.0 inhabitants per square mile (530.1/km^{2}). There were 1,046 housing units at an average density of 672.7 per square mile (259.7/km^{2}). The racial makeup of the CDP was 93.26% White, 3.70% African American, 0.33% Native American, 1.03% Asian, 0.56% from other races, and 1.12% from two or more races. Hispanic or Latino of any race were 1.55%.

There were 997 households, 23.2% had children under the age of 18 living with them, 38.6% were married couples living together, 11.0% had a female householder with no husband present, and 47.0% were non-families. 38.7% of households were made up of individuals, and 11.2% were one person aged 65 or older. The average household size was 2.14 and the average family size was 2.92.

The age distribution was 20.0% under the age of 18, 10.8% from 18 to 24, 33.0% from 25 to 44, 22.8% from 45 to 64, and 13.3% 65 or older. The median age was 36 years. For every 100 females, there were 96.2 males. For every 100 females age 18 and over, there were 98.7 males.

The median household income was $43,634 and the median family income was $59,180. Males had a median income of $36,708 versus $26,404 for females. The per capita income for the CDP was $23,099. About 5.0% of families and 7.7% of the population were below the poverty line, including 6.4% of those under age 18 and none of those age 65 or over.

== Education ==
Pottstown is within the Owen J. Roberts School District. Owen J. Roberts High School is the zoned comprehensive high school.
