= Cedarville =

Cedarville may refer to:

== Places ==
United States

- Cedarville, Arkansas
- Cedarville, California
- Cedarville, Illinois
- Cedarville, Indiana
- Cedarville, Kentucky
- Cedarville, Maryland
- Cedarville, Massachusetts
- Cedarville, Michigan
- Cedarville, Missouri
- Cedarville, New Jersey
- Cedarville, New York
- Cedarville, Ohio
  - Cedarville University
- Cedarville, Pennsylvania
- Cedarville Township, Michigan
- Cedarville Township, Greene County, Ohio
- Cedarville, Whatcom County, Washington
- Cedarville, West Virginia
- Cedarville, Wisconsin

Canada

- Cedarville, Grey County, Ontario
- Cedarville, Simcoe County, Ontario

South Africa

- Cedarville, Eastern Cape

== Other uses ==
- SS Cedarville, a lake freighter that sank in 1965 in the U.S./Canadian Great Lakes
