= East Nantmeal Township, Pennsylvania =

Township in Pennsylvania, US

East Nantmeal Township
- Township
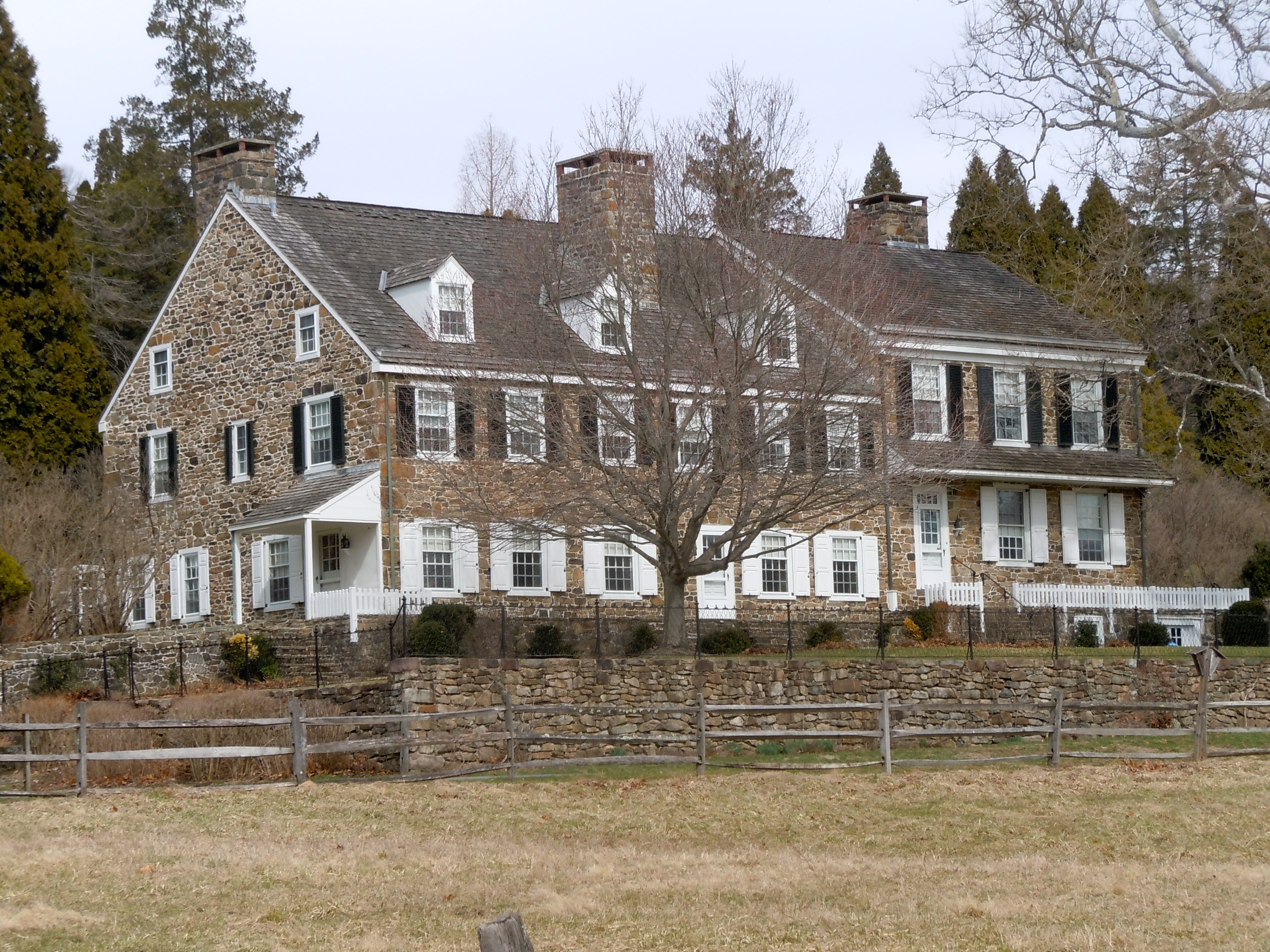
- Warwick Farmhouse, part of a historic district in the township of Warwick, neighboring East Nantmeal

- Location of East Nantmeal Township in Chester County, Pennsylvania and the state of Pennsylvania

- Location of Pennsylvania in the United States
- Coordinates: 40°07′00″N 75°43′59″W
- Country: United States
- State: Pennsylvania
- County: Chester

Area
  - Total: 16.38 sq mi (42.43 km^{2})
  - Land: 16.21 sq mi (41.99 km^{2})
  - Water: 0.17 sq mi (0.44 km^{2})
- Elevation: 617 ft (188 m)

Population (2020)
  - Total: 1,832
  - Estimate (2023): 1,854
  - Density: 113.6/sq mi (43.85/km^{2})
- Time zone: UTC-5 (EST)
  - Summer (DST): UTC-4 (EDT)
- Area code: 610
- FIPS code: 42-029-21576
- Website: www.eastnantmeal.org

East Nantmeal Township is a township in Chester County, Pennsylvania, United States. The population was 1,832 at the 2020 census. Along with West Nantmeal Township, it was originally part of a single Nantmeal Township, which was divided in 1739.

== Geography ==
According to the U.S. Census Bureau, the township has a total area of 16.4 square miles (42 km^{2}), of which 0.06% is water. The township is partially located in the Hopewell Big Woods.

Adjacent townships

- South Coventry Township (northeast)
- West Vincent Township (east)
- Upper Uwchlan Township (southeast)
- Wallace Township (south)
- West Nantmeal Township (west)
- Warwick Township (north)

== Demographics ==
Historical population
Census	Pop.	Note	%±
1930	594		—
1940	549		−7.6%
1950	665		21.1%
1960	730		9.8%
1970	858		17.5%
1980	1,222		42.4%
1990	1,448		18.5%
2000	1,787		23.4%
2010	1,803		0.9%
2020	1,832		1.6%
2023 (est.)	1,854		1.2%

At the 2010 census, the township was 96.0% non-Hispanic White, 0.8% Black or African American, 0.1% Native American, 0.7% Asian, and 0.7% were two or more races. 1.9% of the population were of Hispanic or Latino ancestry.

As of the census of 2000, there were 1,787 people, 569 households, and 451 families residing in the township. The population density was 109.1 inhabitants per square mile (42.1/km^{2}). There were 587 housing units at an average density of 35.8 per square mile (13.8/km^{2}). The racial makeup of the township was 97.87% White, 1.01% African American, 0.28% Asian, 0.06% Pacific Islander, 0.34% from other races, and 0.45% from two or more races. Hispanic or Latino of any race were 0.73% of the population.

There were 569 households, out of which 36.6% had children under the age of 18 living with them, 72.8% were married couples living together, 4.6% had a female householder with no husband present, and 20.7% were non-families. 16.0% of all households were made up of individuals, and 5.6% had someone living alone who was 65 years of age or older. The average household size was 2.74 and the average family size was 3.10.

In the township, the population was spread out, with 27.7% under the age of 18, 8.5% from 18 to 24, 30.1% from 25 to 44, 25.5% from 45 to 64, and 8.3% who were 65 years of age or older. The median age was 38 years. For every 100 females there were 102.8 males. For every 100 females aged 18 and over, there were 99.1 males.

The median income for a household in the township was $72,375, and the median income for a family was $78,848. Males had a median income of $52,391 versus $30,125 for females. The per capita income for the township was $32,258. About 1.8% of families and 7.4% of the population were below the poverty line, including 0.5% of those under age 18 and 4.1% of those age 65 or over.

== Education ==
The township is within the Owen J. Roberts School District. Owen J. Roberts High School is the zoned comprehensive high school.

== Points of interest ==
Nantmeal was named by Welsh immigrants from the village of Nantmel in Radnorshire, now part of Powys. The Welsh name, Nantmel, means 'the valley of Mael', a tenth-century prince. The incorrect belief that it means 'Honey Brook' is based on a confusion between the personal name 'Mael', and the Welsh word 'mêl', 'honey'. The Thomas Bull House was built sometime between 1783 and 1796; Bull was a stonemason and the manager of Samuel Van Leer's Reading Furnace; he served as a lieutenant colonel in the Revolutionary War.

Reading Furnace straddles French Creek, which forms part of the boundary between East Nantmeal and Warwick townships. The site began as an iron furnace in 1736 and later owned by the Van Leer family. It was developed as a farm in the early 19th century, and was then remodeled as a country estate for Arthur Pew in 1936. The remodeled mansion (1812) was designed by architect R. Brognard Okie.

Reading Furnace forms a significant part of the history of the early iron industry and of the families Nutt, Rutter, Savage, Branson, Van Leer and Potts.

Welkinweir (the Grace and Everett Rodebaugh Estate) is a 162-acre (0.66 km^{2}) preserve encompassing three buildings, gardens, ponds, natural wildlife habitat, trails, wetlands and woods. Grace and Everett Rodebaugh purchased the aging farm in 1935 as a weekend retreat and summer home. They retained architect Fridtjof Tobiessen to "make the mansion livable." This may be the only significant residential commission of Tobiessen, whose principal works were public schools, memorials, and churches.

Brower's Bridge, Nantmeal Village Historic District, Thomas Bull House, Warwick Furnace Farms, and Welkinweir are listed on the National Register of Historic Places.

== Transportation ==
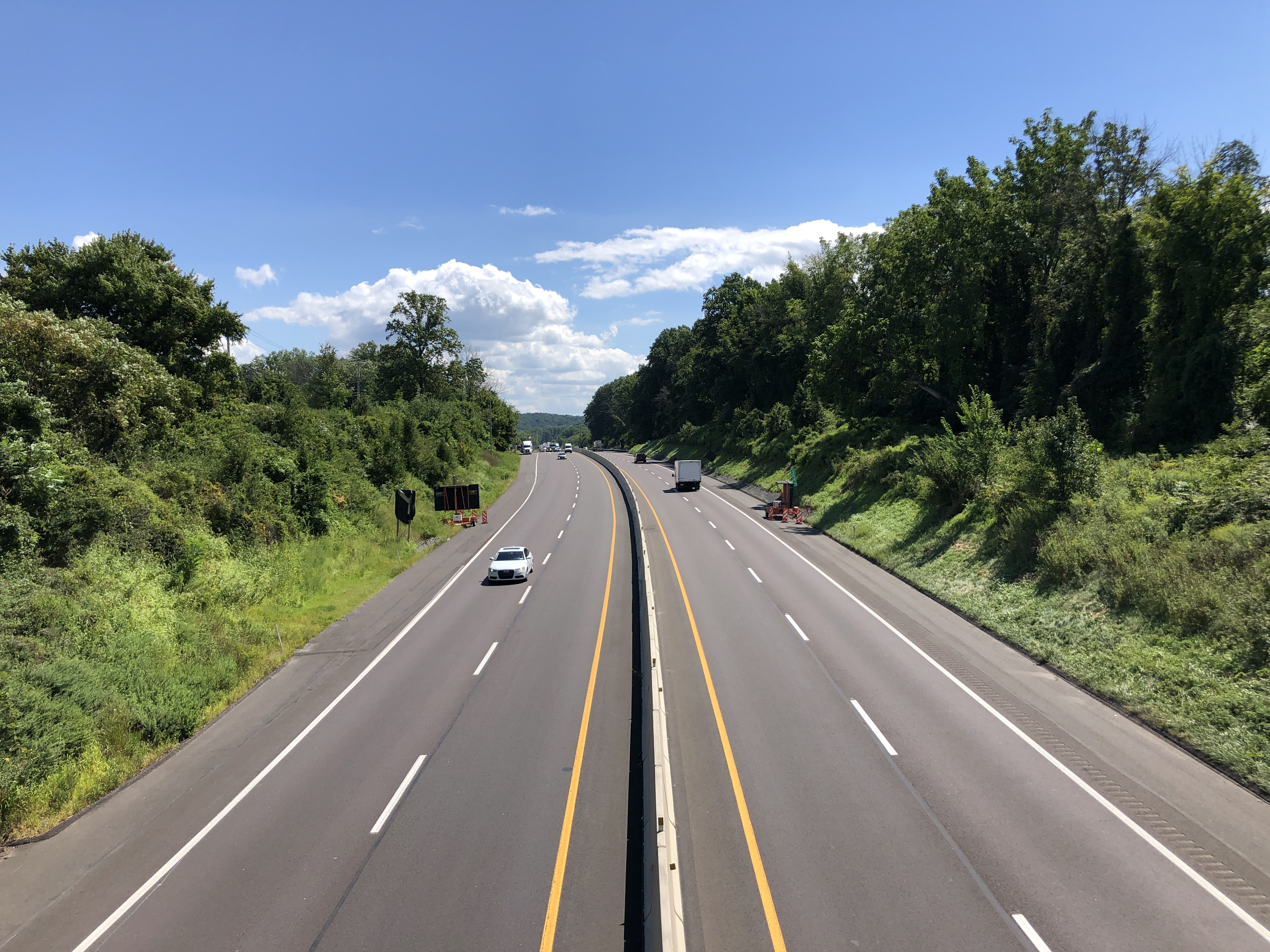
The Pennsylvania Turnpike/I-76 eastbound in East Nantmeal Township

As of 2018, there were 43.97 miles (70.76 km) of public roads in East Nantmeal Township, of which 1.60 miles (2.57 km) were maintained by the Pennsylvania Turnpike Commission (PTC), 14.42 miles (23.21 km) were maintained by the Pennsylvania Department of Transportation (PennDOT) and 28.95 miles (46.59 km) were maintained by the township.

The Pennsylvania Turnpike (I-76) runs through southwestern portions of the township, but there are no interchanges within the township. The nearest interchange is with Pennsylvania Route 100, which follows Pottstown Pike along a northeast-southwest alignment through the eastern portion of the township. Pennsylvania Route 345 follows Bulltown Road along a northeast-southwest alignment through the western portion of the township. Finally, Pennsylvania Route 401 follows Conestoga Road along a northwest-southeast alignment through the central portion of the township.

== Notable person ==
- Samuel Van Leer (1747-1825), captain in the Continental Army during the American Revolution
