= Herbert Hoover Supreme Court candidates =

During his only term in office, President Herbert Hoover appointed three members of the Supreme Court of the United States: Chief Justice Charles Evans Hughes, and Associate Justices Owen Roberts and Benjamin Cardozo. Additionally, with his failed nomination of John J. Parker, Hoover became the first president since Grover Cleveland to have a Supreme Court nomination rejected by the United States Senate.

== Charles Evans Hughes nomination ==
Chief Justice William Howard Taft retired on February 3, 1930, and the same day Hoover nominated former Associate Justice Charles Evans Hughes to fill the vacancy. Hughes was confirmed by the United States Senate on February 13, 1930 by a vote of 52–26.

Hughes had served as Governor of New York, law professor at Cornell, and an associate justice of the Supreme Court. He ran for President in 1916 and was Secretary of State from 1921 to 1925.

Hughes' nomination was opposed by progressives and Southern Democrats, and also due to his age. At 67, Hughes was the oldest man ever nominated as Chief Justice. He survived the contentious confirmation process, accepted by a vote of 52 to 26.

For all of its eleven years, the Hughes Court had to wrestle with the economic problems of the Great Depression. Hughes was prolific, producing 283 opinions during his tenure. He was considered a judicial activist with regard to civil liberties. On economic issues he generally supported limits on the regulatory powers of the federal government and states (judicial activism) until 1937, and accepted federal legislation (judicial restraint) from then on.

== John J. Parker/Owen Roberts nomination ==
Associate Justice Edward T. Sanford died on March 8, 1930. On March 21, 1930, Hoover nominated John J. Parker to fill the vacancy. Parker’s nomination came under fire from organized labor and the NAACP, and was rejected by the United States Senate on May 7, 1930 by a vote of 39–41. Hoover moved quickly to name a replacement and nominated Philadelphia attorney Owen Roberts on May 9, 1930. Roberts garnered widespread support due to his role in prosecuting the Teapot Dome scandal, and he was confirmed by the Senate on May 20, 1930 by a voice vote.

== Benjamin Cardozo nomination ==
In 1932, Justice Oliver Wendell Holmes retired from the Court. Hoover was immediately pressured on a number of fronts to appoint highly esteemed New York judge Benjamin N. Cardozo to the vacancy. Support came from the entire faculty of the University of Chicago Law School, as well as the deans of the law schools at Harvard, Yale, and Columbia. Justice Harlan F. Stone also strongly urged Hoover to name Cardozo, even offering to resign to make room for him if Hoover had his heart set on someone else. (Note: Stone had in fact suggested to Calvin Coolidge that he should nominate Cardozo rather than himself back in 1925) Hoover, however, originally demurred: there were already two justices from New York, and a Jew on the court; in addition, Justice James Clark McReynolds was a notorious anti-Semite. When the chairman of the Senate Foreign Relations Committee, William E. Borah of Idaho, added his strong support for Cardozo, however, Hoover finally bowed to the pressure, and nominated Cardozo on February 15, 1932.

The New York Times said of Cardozo’s appointment that "seldom, if ever, in the history of the Court has an appointment been so universally commended." Democrat Cardozo’s appointment by a Republican president has been referred to as one of the few Supreme Court appointments in history not motivated by partisanship or politics, but strictly based on the nominee’s contribution to law. However, Hoover was running for re-election, eventually against Franklin D. Roosevelt, so a larger political calculation may have been operating.

Cardozo was confirmed by a unanimous voice vote in the Senate on February 24, 1932. On a radio broadcast on March 1, 1932, the day of Cardozo’s confirmation, Clarence C. Dill, Democratic Senator for Washington, called Hoover’s appointment of Cardozo "the finest act of his career as President".

== Names mentioned ==
Following is a list of individuals who were mentioned in various news accounts and books as having been considered by Hoover for a Supreme Court appointment:

=== United States Supreme Court (elevation to chief justice) ===
- Harlan Fiske Stone (1872–1946)

=== United States courts of appeals ===

- Court of Appeals for the Second Circuit
  - Learned Hand (1872–1961)
- Court of Appeals for the Fourth Circuit
  - John J. Parker (1885–1958) (nominated and rejected)
- Court of Appeals for the Fifth Circuit
  - Joseph Chappell Hutcheson Jr. (1879–1973)
  - Samuel Hale Sibley (1873–1958)
- Court of Appeals for the Sixth Circuit
  - Smith Hickenlooper (1880–1933)
- Court of Appeals for the Eighth Circuit
  - William S. Kenyon (1869–1933)
  - Kimbrough Stone (1875–1958)
- Court of Appeals for the Tenth Circuit
  - Orie Leon Phillips (1885–1974)
- Court of Appeals for the D.C. Circuit
  - Duncan Lawrence Groner (1873–1957)

=== United States district courts ===
- William P. James (1870–1940), Judge; United States District Court for the Southern District of California
- Walter C. Lindley (1880–1958), Judge; United States District Court for the Eastern District of Illinois
- Thomas D. Thacher (1881–1950), Judge; United States District Court for the Southern District of New York

=== State supreme courts ===
- Frank Ely Atwood (1878–1943) – Judge, Missouri Supreme Court
- Howard L. Bickley (1871–1947) – Judge, New Mexico Supreme Court
- Benjamin N. Cardozo (1870–1938) – Chief Judge, New York Court of Appeals (nominated and confirmed)
- Fred Tarbell Field (1876–1950) – Associate Justice, Massachusetts Supreme Judicial Court
- Warren Olney Jr. (1870–1939) – Former Associate Justice, California Supreme Court
- Arthur Prentice Rugg (1862–1938) – Chief Justice, Massachusetts Supreme Judicial Court

=== United States senators ===
- William E. Borah (1865–1940) – United States Senator from Idaho

=== Other backgrounds ===
- Newton D. Baker (1871–1937) – Member of Permanent Court of Arbitration; former Mayor of Cleveland and United States Secretary of War
- John W. Davis (1873–1955) – former Solicitor General of the United States
- James Rudolph Garfield (1865–1950) – former United States Secretary of the Interior
- Charles Evans Hughes (1862–1948) – Judge, World Court; former United States Secretary of State under Coolidge and Harding; former Associate Justice of the Supreme Court (nominated and confirmed)
- William D. Mitchell (1874–1955) – United States Attorney General; former United States Solicitor General
- Owen J. Roberts (1875–1955) – Private attorney (nominated and confirmed)
- Silas H. Strawn (1866–1946) – President, American Bar Association; partner in Winston & Strawn

== See also ==
- United States federal judge
- Judicial appointment history for United States federal courts
