= Senator Rea =

Senator Rea may refer to:

- John Rea (politician) (1755–1829), Pennsylvania State Senate
- J. Morris Rea (1846–1895), Iowa State Senate
- James F. Rea (born 1937), Illinois State Senate
