= Owen J. Roberts School District =

School district in Pennsylvania

The Owen J. Roberts School District is a school district in northern Chester County, Pennsylvania. Its headquarters are in South Coventry Township, with a Pottstown postal address.

The school district operates five elementary schools (East Coventry, North Coventry, East Vincent, West Vincent, and French Creek), one middle school, and one high school (Owen J. Roberts High School). Its administration occupies the Warwick administration building, which used to be Warwick elementary school.

The district has around 4,800 students. The school property tax rate is 30.5045 mills.

It includes East Coventry Township, East Nantmeal Township, East Vincent Township, North Coventry Township (including Kenilworth and South Pottstown), South Coventry Township (including Pughtown), Warwick Township, and West Vincent Township.

The school district covers an area of 110 square miles (280 km^{2}) in seven townships. In 2009, the district completed renovations on the middle school. From 2015 to 2018, the district modernized the East Coventry Elementary School building.

The school board has considered adding a new elementary school and rezoning the district to accommodate the rising population of the district. Proposed names have included New Kimberton Elementary School, Gene Elementary School, South Coventry Elementary School, and Boofer Mill Elementary School.

The district, as of the 2024-2025 academic year, has pushed back the school start and stop times from 7:30AM–2:15PM to 8:00AM–2:45PM for the high school and middle school, and from 8:30AM–3:15PM to 8:50AM–3:30PM for the elementary schools . In addition the district has changed its kindergarten classes to full time for the 2025-26 school year.

The district is named after Owen J. Roberts (1875-1955), associate justice of the U.S. Supreme Court, who purchased the Strickland-Roberts Homestead in West Vincent Township in 1927, and died there in 1955.
