= French Creek Farm =

- U.S. National Register of Historic Places
- U.S. Historic district
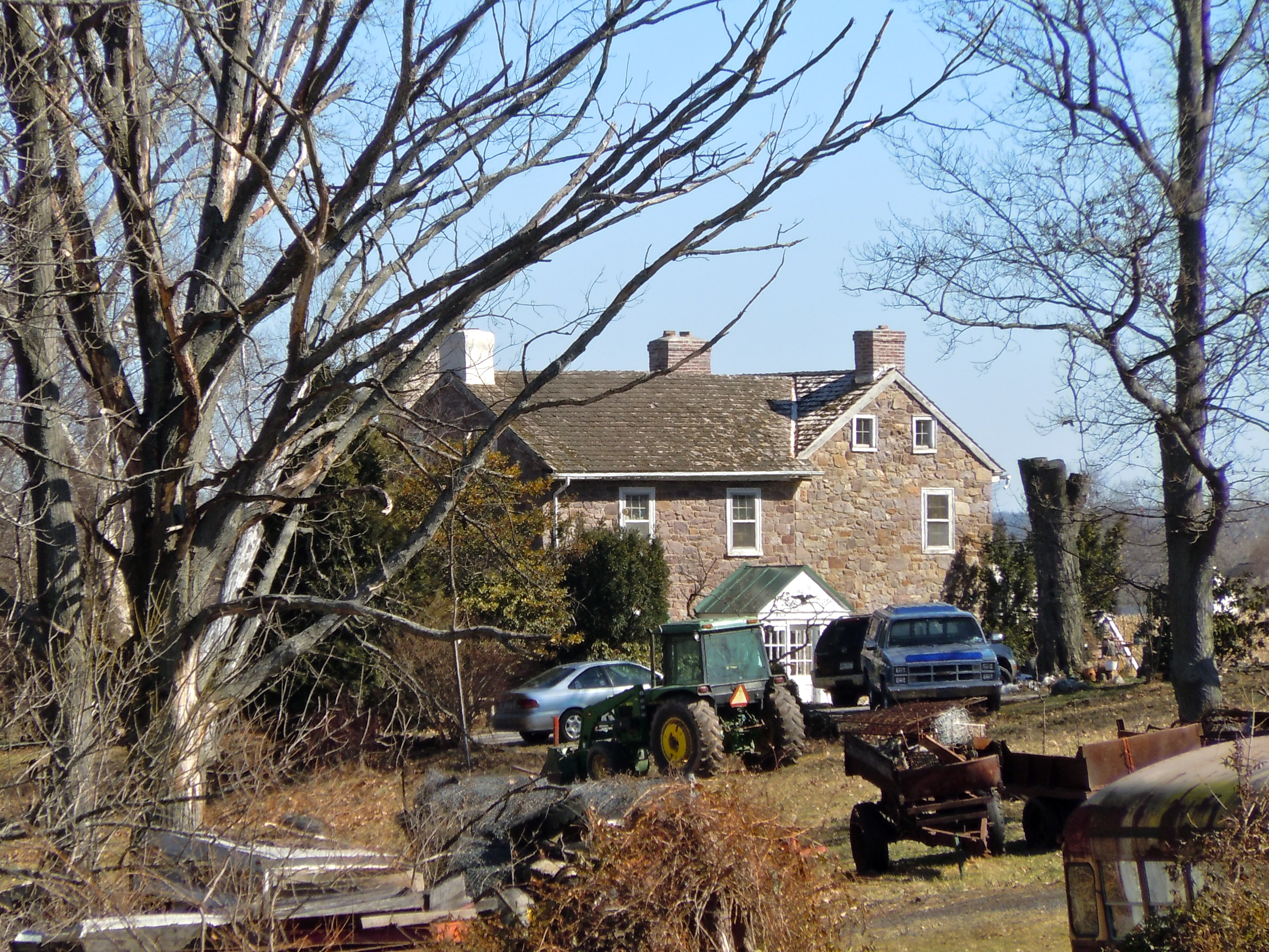
- French Creek Farmhouse, March 2011

- Location within Pennsylvania Location within the United States
- Location: Kimberton Rd., West Vincent Township, Pennsylvania
- Coordinates: 40°08′12″N 75°35′14″W
- Area: 2 acres (0.81 ha)
- Built: c. 1795-1812
- Built by: Aman, George
- NRHP reference No.: 88002372
- Added to NRHP: November 3, 1988

French Creek Farm, also known as The Aman Farm, is a historic farm and national historic district located in West Vincent Township, Chester County, Pennsylvania. The farm has four contributing buildings. They are a stone spring house (1795), stuccoed small barn and wagonshed (1796–97), 2 1/2-story stone smokehouse (1799), and the farmhouse. The farmhouse was built in three stages and is a 2 1/2-story, six-bay stone dwelling with a gable roof. The oldest section was built in 1804–04, with additions made in 1808 and 1812.

It was added to the National Register of Historic Places in 1988.
