= Nantmeal Village Historic District =

Historic district and unincorporated community in Pennsylvania, United States

- U.S. National Register of Historic Places
- U.S. Historic district
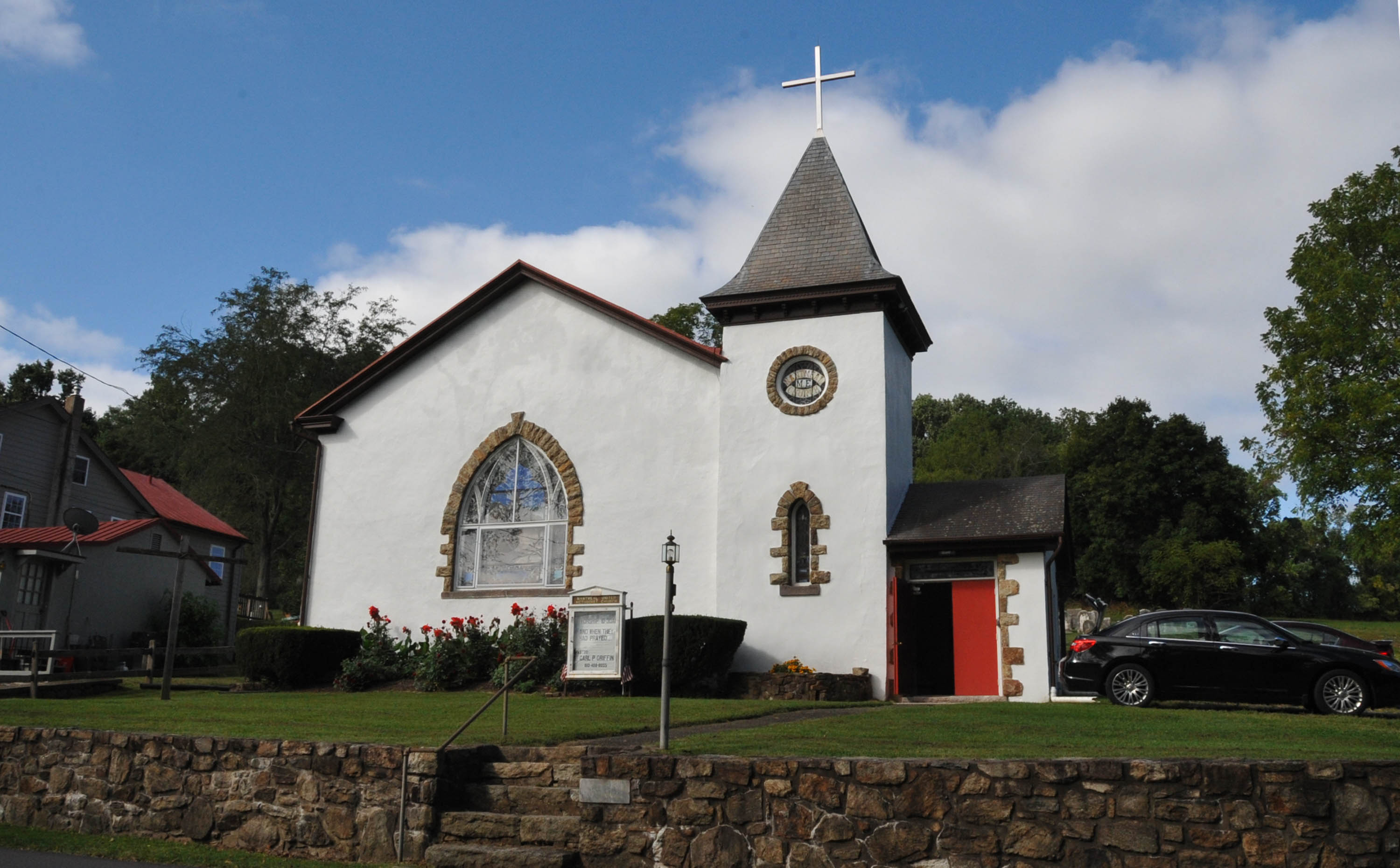
- United Methodist Church on Nantmeal Road near Fairview Road

- Location within Pennsylvania Location within the United States
- Location: Vicinity of Nantmeal, Fairview, Coventryville, and Horseshoe Trail Roads, East Nantmeal Township, Chester County, Pennsylvania
- Coordinates: 40.1417°N 75.70498°W
- Area: 740 acres (300 ha)
- Built: c. 1735-1934
- Architect: Multiple
- Architectural style: Colonial, Federal, Greek Revival, Late Victorian
- NRHP reference No.: 14000466
- Added to NRHP: August 1, 2014

Nantmeal Village Historic District is an American unincorporated community and historic district located in East Nantmeal Township, Chester County, in the U.S. state of Pennsylvania. The district encompasses 740 acres with 69 contributing buildings and 9 other contributing sites and structures, all privately owned. The structures span from 1735 to 1934. It was listed on the National Register of Historic Places in 2014.

== Description and history ==
This rural district consists of Nantmeal Village and surrounding agricultural and wooded land in the vicinity of Nantmeal, Fairview, Coventryville, and Horseshoe Trail Roads in East Nantmeal Township, extending less than a mile in any direction from the district center. The population of the entire township was only 1,800 in 2014, making East Nantmeal one of the least populated municipalities in fast-growing Chester County. With only 48 noncontributing structures in the historic district, the village has retained much of its rural character.

European colonists settled the area circa 1735, when David Stephens built the surviving log section of the Abraham Prizer House, the oldest historic resource in the district. The district includes a mix of residential, commercial, agricultural, and cultural sites, including a smithy and cabinetry shop from 1760, a general store from 1820, a former schoolhouse from 1861, a Quaker meetinghouse (demolished circa 1885) and cemetery, and dozens of historic homes, barns, springhouses, privies, and other structures, along with stone ruins. The most salient feature is the Nantmeal United Methodist Church, constructed in 1852 and renovated in 1902 in the Gothic Revival style. The buildings reflect a range of vernacular architectural styles, notably Colonial, Federal, Greek Revival, and Victorian, plus a handful of Italianate structures, notably the parsonage.

A post office called Nantmeal Village was established in 1876 and remained in operation until 1918.
