= J. Morris Rea =

American politician (1846–1895)

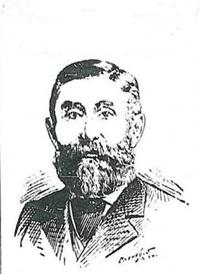

Joseph Morris Rea (1846–1895), often known simply as J. Morris Rea, was an Iowa attorney and politician. He served in the Iowa State Senate from 1893 to 1895.

== Early life and education ==
Joseph Morris Rea was born to George and Ann Rea on March 1, 1846, in Chester County, Pennsylvania. After living for a time in North Coventry Township, the family moved west to Mount Carroll, Illinois in 1854.

Rea studied at the Mount Carroll Seminary, later known as Shimer College, from his family's arrival in Mount Carroll in 1854 until 1863. His classmates at the small school included future Illinois politicians H.H.C. Miller and Virgil Ferguson, and future Iowa Speaker of the House William H. Redman.

Rea subsequently attended the old University of Chicago, graduating with a Bachelor of Science degree in 1867.

After graduating from the University of Chicago, Rea read law in the office of C.B. Smith in Mount Carroll. In 1869, he completed his studies and became a member of the Illinois bar.

== Political career ==
Rea moved from Illinois to Grundy Center, Iowa, in 1870. He went into practice with his brother-in-law, Francis Garner Moffett. The two also purchased the county's only newspaper, the Grundy County Atlas, running it for the next six years, Moffett serving as local editor and Rea as political editor. The Atlas, later succeeded by the Republican, was the only newspaper serving Grundy County. In 1876, they sold the paper to Rea's fellow Mount Carroll Seminary alumnus Charles Keiter.

In 1871, Rea was elected the Grundy County superintendent of schools and served for two years. Later, he also served for some time on the Grundy Center school board, including a stint as its president.

In 1875, Rea married Ann Raymond. They had two children, George and Ralph.

A lifelong Republican, Rea was presented as the preferred choice of the Grundy County Republican Party for senate at every election from 1879 to 1893. Rea also served as an alternate delegate to the Republican National Convention in 1884.

In 1893, Rea was elected to the state senate of Iowa as a Republican, representing the 38th district, which comprised the counties of Grundy and Black Hawk. He served in the 25th Iowa General Assembly in 1894, but died before reaching the second half of his senatorial term.

In addition to his political work, Rea was a director of the Grundy County National Bank, which he had helped to organize. He was also a member of the Knights Templar Masons, who presided at his funeral. He was a lifelong member of the Baptist church.

Rea died at his home in Grundy Center on August 25, 1895. He had been diagnosed some time previously with Bright's disease.

== Works cited ==
- Iowa Historical Society. "Rea, J. Morris" (PDF).
- Iowa General Assembly (1896). "In Memoriam of Hon. J. Morris Rea, Late Senator, 38th District". Journal of the Iowa General Assembly: 100–105.
- Portrait and Biographical Record of Jasper, Marshall and Grundy Counties, Iowa (PDF). 1894. pp. 502–503.
