= Thomas Bull House =

Historic house in Pennsylvania, United States

- U.S. National Register of Historic Places
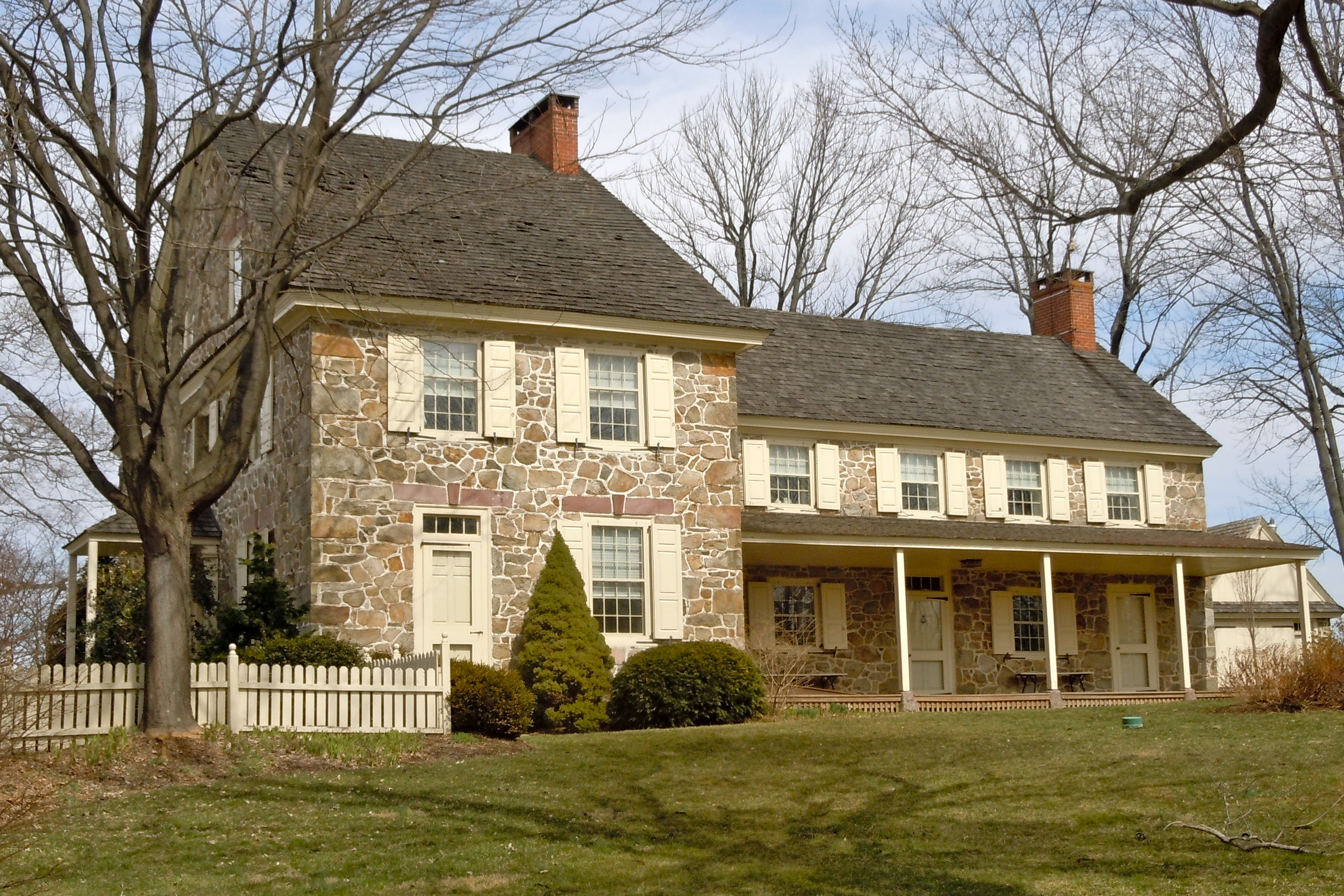
- Thomas Bull House, March 2011

- Location within Pennsylvania Location within the United States
- Location: East of Elverson on Bulltown Road, East Nantmeal Township, Pennsylvania
- Coordinates: 40°09′03″N 75°47′34″W
- Area: 2.5 acres (1.0 ha)
- Built: c. 1715, c. 1785
- Built by: Bull, Thomas; Et al.
- Architectural style: Georgian, Federal
- NRHP reference No.: 79002198
- Added to NRHP: August 3, 1979

The Thomas Bull House, also known as Robert's Plantation, the Redding Plantation, and Mt. Pleasant, is an historic home that is located in East Nantmeal Township, Chester County, Pennsylvania, United States.

The farm was added to the National Register of Historic Places in 1979.

== History and architectural features ==
Originally built in 1715 and owned by Owen Roberts, the property was sold in 1729 to William Branson as part of the Redding Plantation, who eventually sold it to Thomas Bull. Thomas Bull was employed by the well known Van Leer family and worked at their historical Reading Furnace as the manager.

The house was created in three parts. The oldest section was built circa 1715 and is part of the two-story, four-bay eastern section of the stone dwelling. The interior of the older part features a circular staircase that wraps around the chimney and is an example of late Georgian/early Federal architecture. The two-story, three-bay, third section has been estimated by historians to have been built between 1783 and 1796.

== See also ==
- Reading Furnace Historic District
- Van Leer Pleasant Hill Plantation
