= Robert Rooke House =

Historic house in Pennsylvania, United States

- U.S. National Register of Historic Places
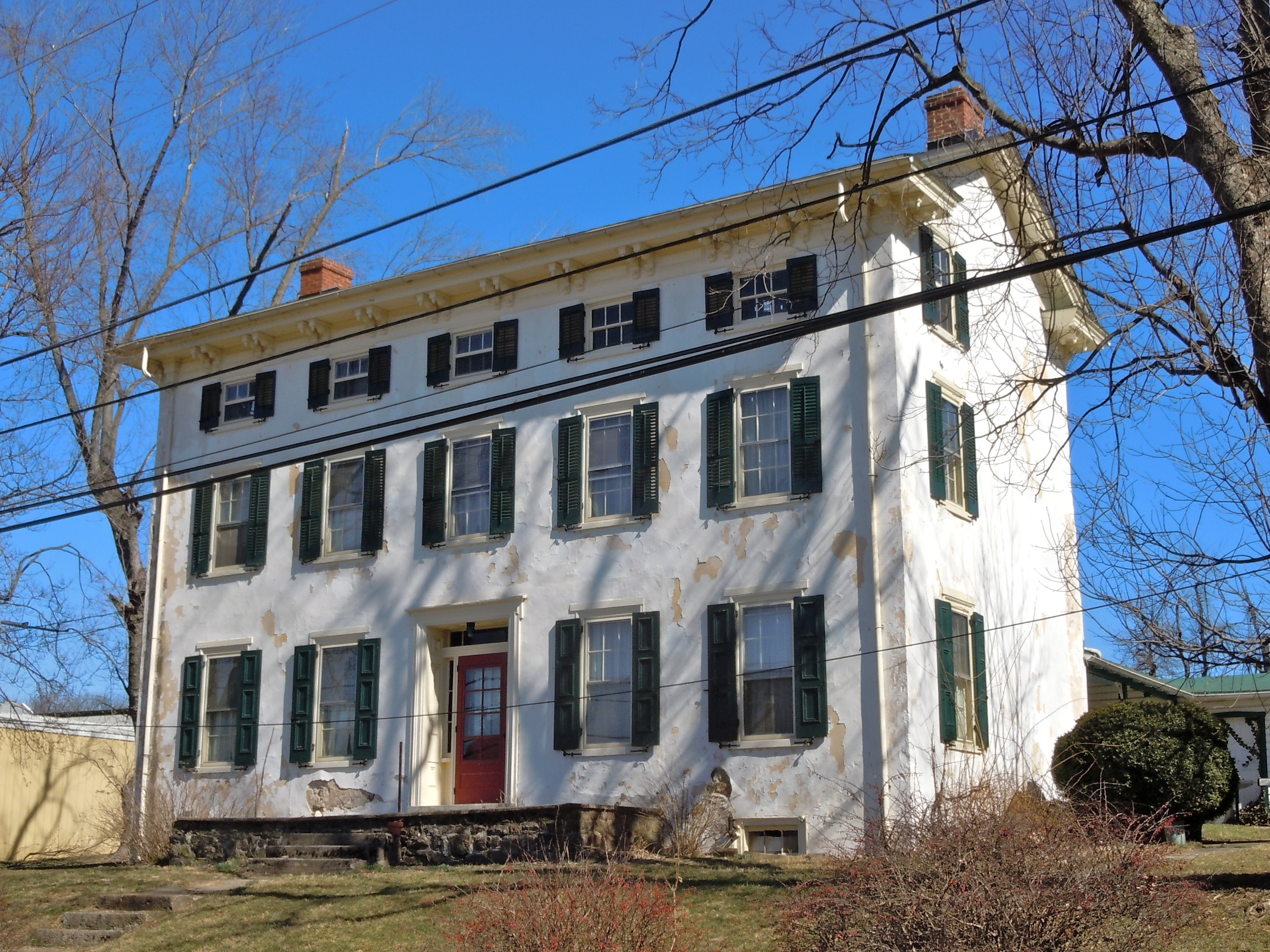
- Rooke House, March 2011

- Location within Pennsylvania Location within the United States
- Location: North of Downingtown on Horseshoe Trail at Fellowship Road, West Vincent Township, Pennsylvania
- Coordinates: 40°07′19″N 75°39′42″W
- Area: 54 acres (22 ha)
- Built: c. 1841
- Architectural style: Georgian, Early Victorian
- NRHP reference No.: 73001602
- Added to NRHP: September 19, 1973

The Robert Rooke House is an historic home that is located in West Vincent Township, Chester County, Pennsylvania, United States.

It was added to the National Register of Historic Places in 1973.

== History and architectural features ==
The house was created in two sections. The original section is a 2 1/2-story, fieldstone structure that is two bays by one bay. The original structure later became the kitchen wing. It was expanded circa 1841 to a three-story, five-bay by two-bay fieldstone structure. It has a gable roof and was designed in a transitional Georgian/Victorian style.
