= Deery Family Homestead =

Historic district in Pennsylvania, United States

- U.S. National Register of Historic Places
- U.S. Historic district
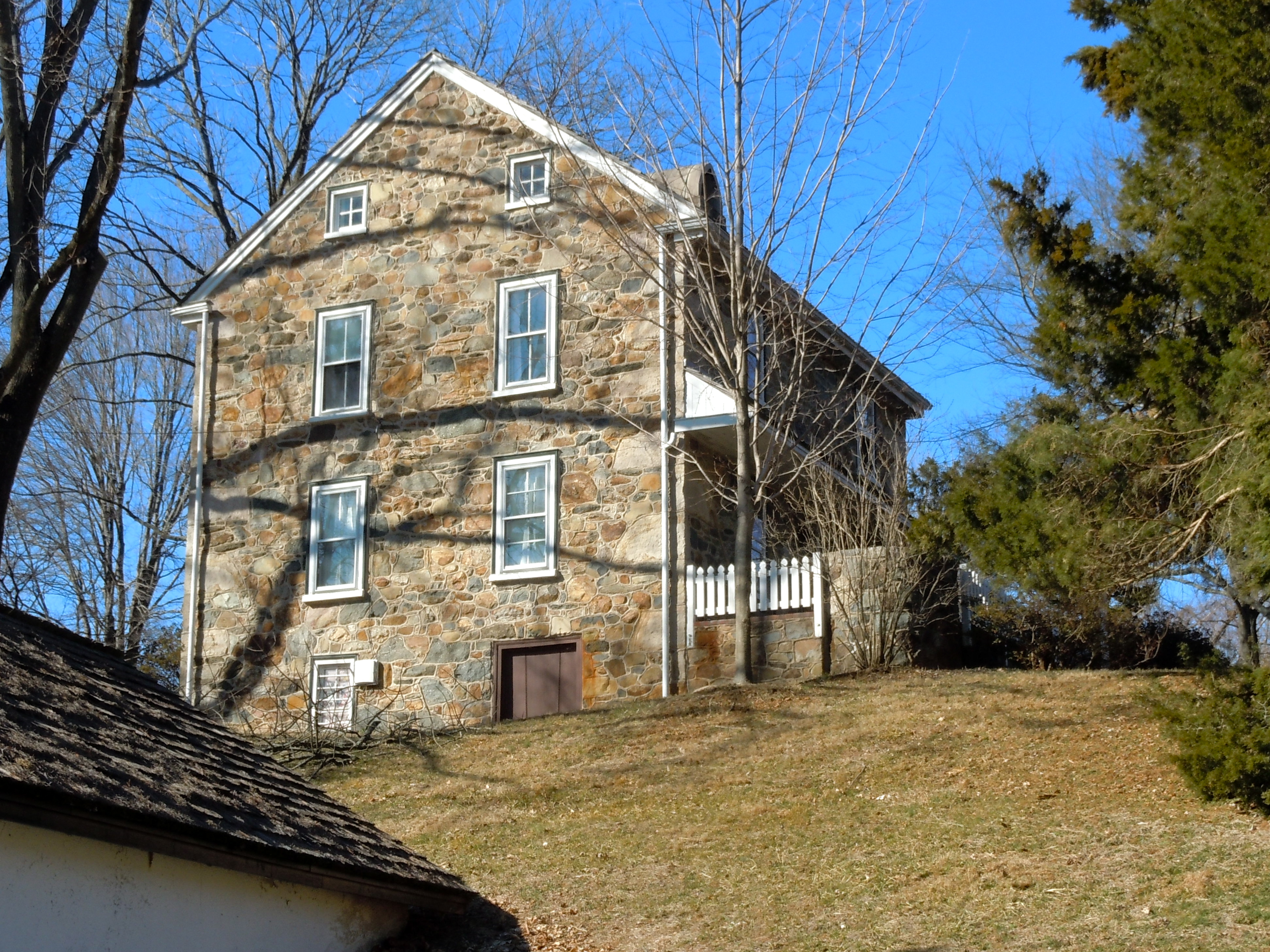
- George Deery House, March 2011

- Location within Pennsylvania Location within the United States
- Location: West of Phoenixville, West Vincent Township, Pennsylvania
- Coordinates: 40°6′47″N 75°36′32″W
- Area: 115 acres (47 ha)
- Built: 1750
- NRHP reference No.: 77001153
- Added to NRHP: December 23, 1977

Deery Family Homestead is a historic farm and national historic district located in West Vincent Township, Chester County, Pennsylvania. The district includes 10 contributing buildings on a self-sustaining family compound. The buildings include the following on the Main Farm: the main house, large stone and frame bank barn (1819), and stone and frame wagon shed. On the Henry Derry Farm are the main house, smaller house, root cellar, large stone bank barn, and two small stone buildings. The district also includes the George Deery House (bef. 1819) and Tenant House.

It was added to the National Register of Historic Places in 1977.
