= The Shoppes at Coventry =

- Location: North Coventry Township, Pennsylvania, United States
- Coordinates: 40.2356°N 75.6621°W
- Opened: October 5, 1967; 59 years ago
- Developer: Kurt Rostan and Seymour A. Friedman
- Manager: Pennmark Management Co.
- Owner: Pennmark Management Co.
- Num. of stores: 50
- Num. of anchor tenants: 4 (2 open, 1 vacant, 1 under construction)
- Floor area: 802,275 sq ft (74,534 m^{2})
- Floors: 1 (2 in Boscov's)
- Parking: Parking lot
- Public transit: PART bus: Green Line

The Shoppes at Coventry is a shopping mall in North Coventry Township, Pennsylvania (Pottstown, Pennsylvania), located at the interchange of Route 100 and Route 724. The mall is anchored by Boscov's and Gabe's. Dunham's Sports plans to open at the mall in 2026.

== History ==
The mall, originally known as the Norco Mall, held its grand opening on October 5, 1967, though several stores opened their doors before this date. It featured Sears and Britt's department stores as anchors, as well as thirteen smaller retail stores, including Thrift Drug and Pantry Pride. In 1974 the original open-air plan was enclosed and expanded to include a new anchor store, J.M. Fields, a two-screen movie theater operated by the Fox Theatres chain, and twenty new retail spaces. In 1978, Britt's and J. M. Fields closed and were replaced by Hess's and Jefferson Ward (the discount store arm of Montgomery Ward), respectively. Jefferson Ward later became Bradlees in 1985. After Bradlees closed in 2001, it was subdivided between Ross Dress for Less and Dick's Sporting Goods. In 1979 the mall was acquired by Goodman Properties and renamed to the Coventry Mall, and in 1982 it underwent further expansion. A Pomeroy's department store was added in 1985. In 1987, this store became a Bon-Ton when that chain bought Pomeroy's; in 1993, it became Boscov's and now has 2 floors and rooftop parking (the latter of which has since been closed to the public). In 1987, a larger eight-screen movie theater was built outside the mall; the old theater was then converted into a food court.

Hess's sold most of its stores to The Bon-Ton in 1994, but was unable to complete a deal with Bon-Ton on the Coventry Mall store, leading to its closure. The store then became JCPenney for a short time, then The Bon-Ton, before finally becoming Kohl's in 2005. In 2004, Stoltz Real Estate Partners acquired the mall from The Goodman Co.

Sears closed in April 2012. Mall owner Coventry Retail LP failed to make payments for the property and Jones Lang LaSalle became the receiver of the mall in March 2013. On September 19, 2013, the mall was sold at auction to U.S. Bank National Association for $49.5 million. Jones Lang LaSalle continued as the receiver and manager of the mall. In January 2014, Ross Dress for Less closed, and that December, Limerick Furniture opened in the former Sears location.

On April 8, 2016, the Coventry Mall was sold to Pennmark Management Co., who planned on improving the mall by filling vacancies with new stores and restaurants. Gabe's, an off-priced retail store, opened on March 18, 2017, in a 45,000-square foot portion of the space formerly occupied by Sears. On May 10, 2018, Jo-Ann, which had up to that point been in an adjacent strip mall, opened a 14,310-square foot store in the mall proper.

In April 2022, it was revealed that the Coventry Mall would be redeveloped into The Shoppes at Coventry, with the interior of the mall closed and stores having exterior entrances like in a strip mall, with anchor stores including Boscov's, Dick's Sporting Goods, Gabe's, and Kohl's remaining open. Big Phil's Bar and Grill opened in the old TGI Fridays restaurant space in early 2022, with Roses Discount Store opening in another portion of the old Sears location that November.

2023 saw the addition of a CubeSmart self storage facility in the former food court and interior mall space. In 2024, Dick's Sporting Goods relocated to Upland Square in Pottstown, Anytime Fitness was rebranded as Fit Life Fitness and expanded into the adjacent former mall space to include pickleball courts, and Piccolo's Italian Market opened in the outdoor shop area.

Kohl's, Roses and Jo-Ann all closed in 2025.

In late 2025, it was announced that Dunham's Sports, a sporting goods store, would be opening a store in the former Kohl’s anchor space in 2026.
