= Jerry Ostroski =

American football player (born 1970)

No. 60
- Position: Guard

Personal information
- Born: July 12, 1970 (age 56); Collegeville, Pennsylvania, U.S.
- Listed height: 6 ft 3 in (1.91 m)
- Listed weight: 320 lb (145 kg)

Career information
- High school: Owen J. Roberts (Pottstown, Pennsylvania)
- College: Tulsa (1988–1991)
- NFL draft: 1992: 10th round, 271st overall pick

Career history
- Kansas City Chiefs (1992)*; Atlanta Falcons (1993)*; Buffalo Bills (1993–2001)
- * Offseason or practice squad member only

Awards and highlights
- First-team All-American (1991); Tulsa Golden Hurricane Jersey No. 55 retired

Career NFL statistics
- Games played: 106
- Games started: 102
- Fumble recoveries: 6
- Stats at Pro Football Reference

Gerald Ostroski Jr. (born July 12, 1970) is an American former professional football player who was an offensive lineman for the Buffalo Bills in the National Football League (NFL). He played college football for the Tulsa Golden Hurricane.

== College career ==
After a standout high school career at Owen J. Roberts High School, Jerry Ostroski played college football at The University of Tulsa, starting every game as a sophomore, junior, and senior. He was selected first-team All-American in 1991 after leading TU to a 10–2 season and victory in the Freedom Bowl. In 1999, Ostroski was named to Tulsa's All-Century Team. On October 27, 2018, Tulsa retired Ostroski’s No. 55 jersey.

== Professional career ==
Ostroski was selected in the tenth round of the 1992 NFL Draft by the Kansas City Chiefs. Ostroski played 106 games (8 years) in the NFL, all with the Bills; he started 102 games at the center, offensive guard, and offensive tackle positions. In his 7th year, 2000, the last of three under head coach Wade Phillips, Ostroski was the starting center in all 16 games. However, in 2001, Ostroski showed his versatility again and moved to right guard.

After recovering from a broken leg in the 2001 preseason, he injured a knee late in the season versus the Atlanta Falcons. Ostroski won the Ed Block Courage Award in 2001.

Due to his knee injury, Ostroski retired on August 27, 2002. At the time of his retirement, he was the longest serving member of the Buffalo Bills. Ostroki's durability and versatility are illustrated by the number of games stated at four different positions: 34 at center, 32 at right guard, 26 at right tackle and 10 at left guard.
