= Kenilworth, Pennsylvania =

Unincorporated community in Pennsylvania, US

Kenilworth
- Census-designated place
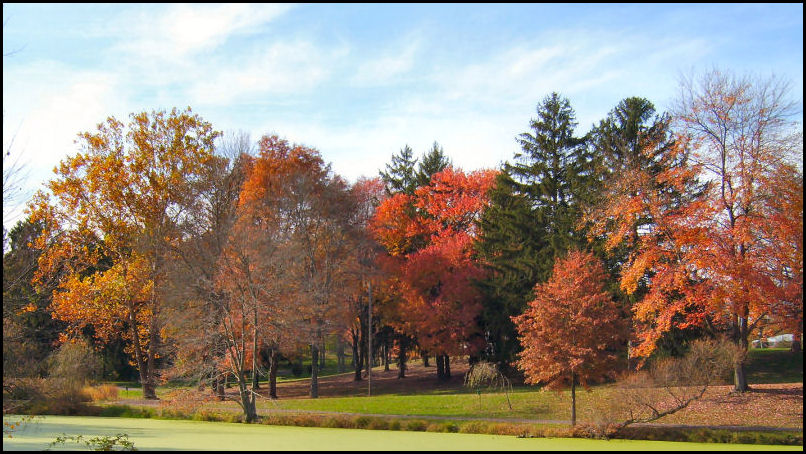
- Kenilworth Park

- Location in Chester County and the U.S. state of Pennsylvania.
- Coordinates: 40°13′46″N 75°38′10″W
- Country: United States
- State: Pennsylvania
- County: Chester
- Township: North Coventry

Area
  - Total: 1.75 sq mi (4.52 km^{2})
  - Land: 1.71 sq mi (4.42 km^{2})
  - Water: 0.039 sq mi (0.10 km^{2})
- Elevation: 177 ft (54 m)

Population (2020)
  - Total: 2,148
  - Density: 1,258.6/sq mi (485.95/km^{2})
- Time zone: UTC-5 (EST)
  - Summer (DST): UTC-4 (EDT)
- ZIP code: 19465
- Area codes: 610, 484, & 835
- FIPS code: 42-39272

Kenilworth is a census-designated place (CDP) in North Coventry Township, Pennsylvania, United States. The population was 2,148 at the 2020 census.

== Geography ==
Kenilworth is located at 40°13′46″N 75°38′10″W (40.229337, -75.636214).

According to the United States Census Bureau, the CDP has a total area of 1.7 square miles (4.4 km^{2}), of which 0.04 square miles (0.10 km^{2}), or 1.16%, is water.

Kenilworth is located on the south side of the Schuylkill River across from the east side of Pottstown and is served by east-to-west routes PA 724 (East Schuylkill Road) and US 422 (Pottstown Expressway.) Its hardiness zone is 7a and the climate is borderline Cfa/Dfa (humid subtropical/hot summer humid continental.) It is served by the Pottstown post office and telephone exchange.

== Demographics ==
Historical population
Census	Pop.	Note	%±
2000	1,576		—
2010	1,907		21.0%
2020	2,148		12.6%
U.S. Decennial Census

At the 2000 census there were 1,576 people, 680 households, and 461 families living in the CDP. The population density was 924.4 inhabitants per square mile (356.9/km^{2}). There were 711 housing units at an average density of 417.0 per square mile (161.0/km^{2}). The racial makeup of the CDP was 95.18% White, 2.03% African American, 1.52% Asian, 0.13% from other races, and 1.14% from two or more races. Hispanic or Latino of any race were 0.51%.

There were 680 households, 25.4% had children under the age of 18 living with them, 54.7% were married couples living together, 9.3% had a female householder with no husband present, and 32.1% were non-families. 26.6% of households were made up of individuals, and 6.8% were one person aged 65 or older. The average household size was 2.32 and the average family size was 2.79.

The age distribution was 19.3% under the age of 18, 8.8% from 18 to 24, 30.4% from 25 to 44, 24.9% from 45 to 64, and 16.7% 65 or older. The median age was 40 years. For every 100 females, there were 101.0 males. For every 100 females age 18 and over, there were 97.5 males.

The median household income was $43,472 and the median family income was $53,359. Males had a median income of $38,625 versus $28,938 for females. The per capita income for the CDP was $21,849. About 1.1% of families and 3.0% of the population were below the poverty line, including 4.2% of those under age 18 and none of those age 65 or over.

== Education ==
Kenilworth is in the Owen J. Roberts School District. Owen J. Roberts High School is the zoned comprehensive high school.
