= Nicholas East House =

Historic house in Pennsylvania, United States

- U.S. National Register of Historic Places
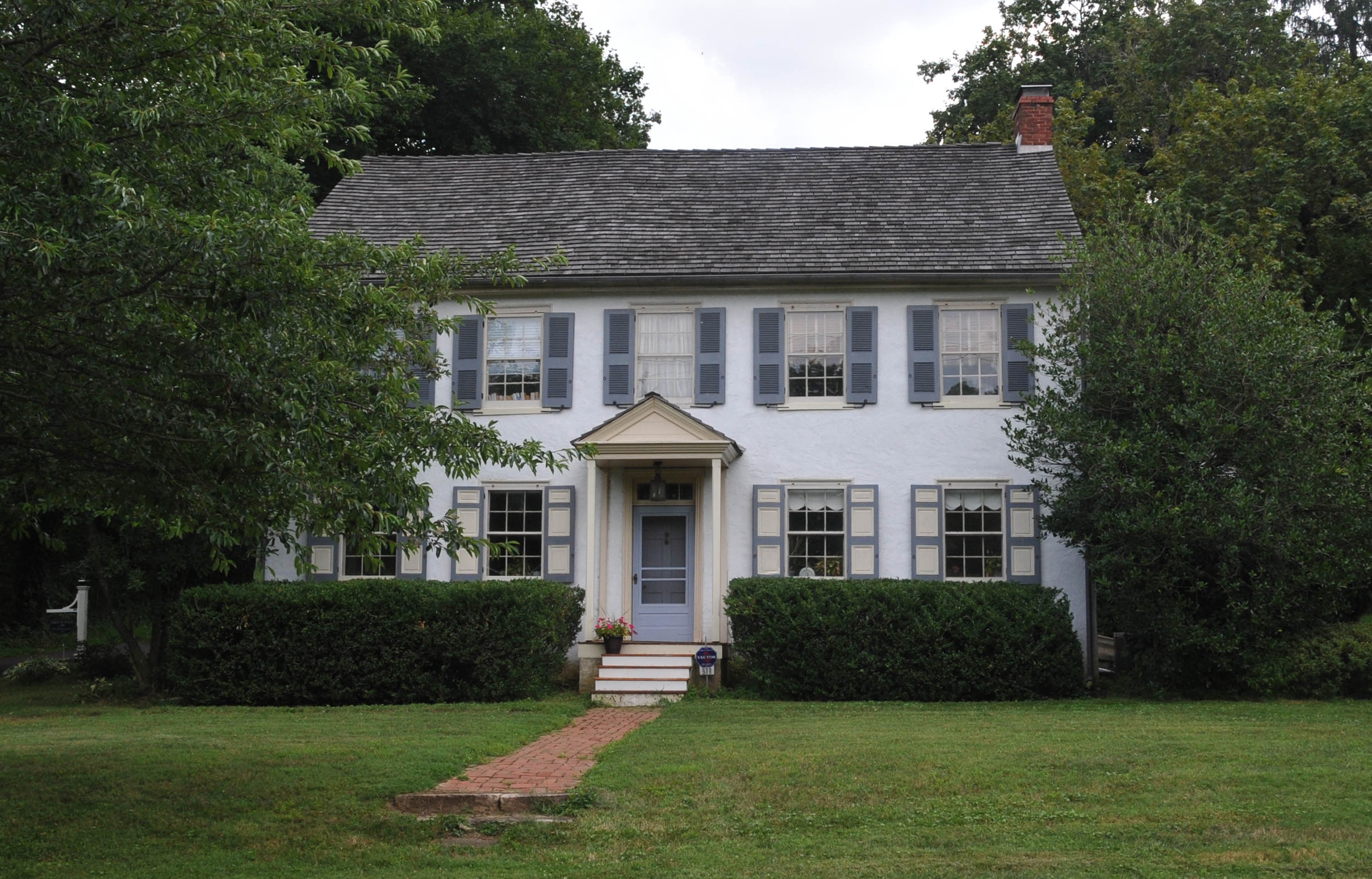

- Location within Pennsylvania Location within the United States
- Location: West of Valley Forge on Kimberton Road, West Vincent Township, Pennsylvania
- Coordinates: 40°6′49″N 75°39′16″W
- Area: less than one acre
- Built: 1820
- NRHP reference No.: 73001614
- Added to NRHP: April 2, 1973

Nicholas East House is a historic home located in West Vincent Township, Chester County, Pennsylvania. The original section was built in 1820, and is a 2 1/2-story, five-bay by two-bay, random fieldstone structure. It has a gable roof and gable end chimneys. It has a two-story rear addition, with a one-story addition attached to it. The front facade features a full-width porch.

It was added to the National Register of Historic Places in 1973.
