= H. H. C. Miller =

American politician

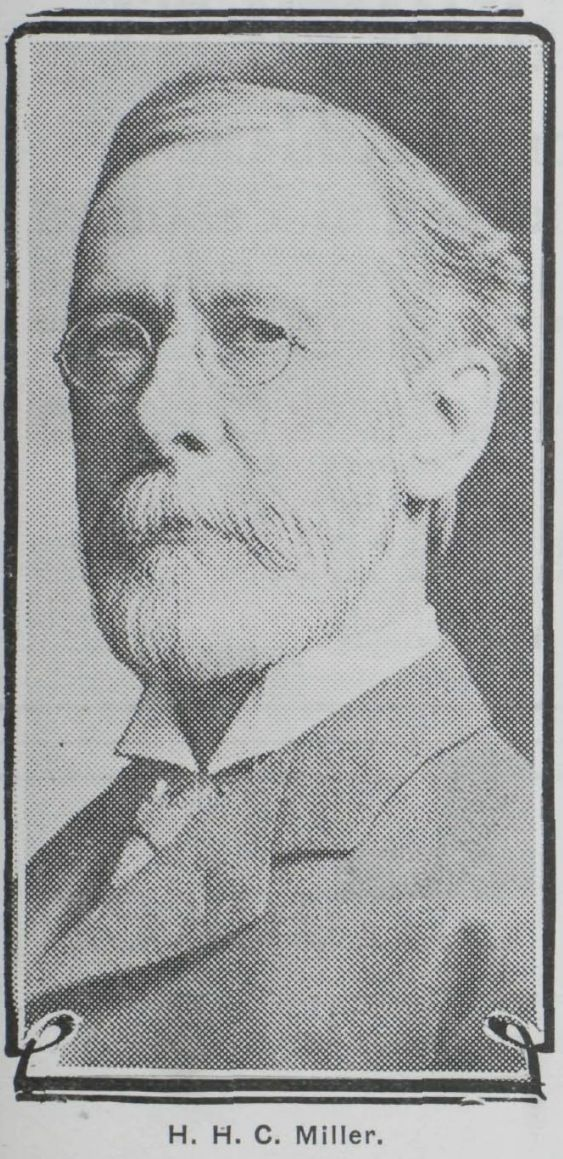

Humphrys Henry Clay Miller (1845–1910) was an American attorney, and civic leader and three-term president of the village board of Evanston, Illinois (the equivalent of mayor). His first name is also frequently spelled Humphrey or Humphreys. He was the first Evanston mayor to be popularly elected.

== Early life and education ==
I shall always regard my going to the Seminary as the most important event in my life, and among the many things for which I am profoundly grateful to my parents, there is no one thing for which I am more grateful than for their decision to send me to Mount Carroll Seminary.

— Humphrys Henry Clay Miller

Humphrys Henry Clay Miller was born to George and Isabella Clark Miller on October 17, 1845, in New York City. In 1854, his family moved to Illinois, first the southern part of the state and later Mount Carroll, Illinois. For some part of this time, he supported himself by teaching school.

Miller attended the Mount Carroll Seminary (later known as Shimer College) from 1860 to 1864. At the Seminary, in addition to his studies, Miller participated in the school's debating club, the Philomathesian Society. In later life he credited the Society's "lessons in parliamentary law" for helping him in subsequent challenges. He remained closely attached to the institution throughout his life.

Upon exiting the Seminary in 1864, Miller attended Union College in Schenectady, New York, transferring after two years to the University of Michigan, where he tested into the junior class. He completed his bachelor's at Michigan in 1868, and his master's in 1871. While at Michigan, he also participated in the Alpha Nu literary society. The society, formed in 1843, was dedicated to the intellectual improvement of its members through writing and debate.

Miller married Harriet S. Lewis in Channahon, Illinois in December 1870. They later had three children.

From 1870 to 1875, Miller worked as a school administrator while studying law in his spare time. He served first as principal of the Channahon high school and later as the superintendent of schools for Morris, Illinois. While working as superintendent, he read law with judge Charles Needham, with whom he formed a partnership after passing the bar.

== Political and legal career ==
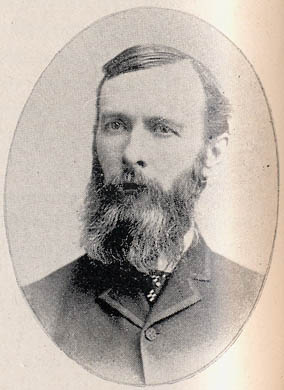
Miller in 1891.

Miller was admitted to the Illinois bar in 1875. After five years in partnership with his teacher Judge Needham, he entered solo practice as a corporate attorney in 1881. He became known as a specialist in banking law. He practiced for his entire career in Chicago, and by 1905 was a senior member of the firm of Miller, Thoman & Oppenheim, which had its offices in Chicago's Marquette Building.

Miller was elected three times as president of the village board of Evanston. He was the first to be elected by popular vote, the previous occupants of the position having been elected solely by the members of the village board. Upon his retirement in May 1891, the citizens of the town held a large reception in his honor, with some 600 attending.

Particularly known for his educational work, Miller served continuously as head of the Evanston Township Board of Education from 1883 until his death in 1910. He also served on the board of trustees of Northwestern University for many years, where he was instrumental in pushing against an 1893 effort by the state legislature to revoke the university's tax-exempt charter. He was vice-president of the Northwestern University board from 1895 until his death.

Miller also served in numerous other political, business and civic positions. Notably among these, he was appointed to the staff of Governor Yates in 1901, with the rank of colonel. He served as a director of the State Bank of Evanston from its establishment in 1892 until his death, He additionally served as president of Evanston's Civil Service Commission from 1894 to 1907.

== Death and legacy ==
Mr. Miller was a very friendly and affectionate man, and probably had not a single enemy. ... He typified the ideal of the word counsellor by his advice keeping his clients out of trouble instead of hurrying them on into the intricacies of the law.

— Daily Northwestern, 1910

Miller died of pneumonia in 1910 following an illness of less than a week. His wife and children all survived him. His remains were cremated at Graceland Cemetery and interred at Rosehill Cemetery.

On the occasion of Miller's funeral on November 17, 1910, all university activities were halted in honor of his contributions. Northwestern University president Abram W. Harris cut short his business trip to Philadelphia to attend the funeral.

Miller was the namesake of the H.H.C. Miller School in Evanston, which was used as a public school from 1898 to 1976. The building, designed by architect Daniel Burnham, still stands at 425 Dempster in Evanston, and now houses a Montessori school.
