= North Coventry Township, Pennsylvania =

Township in Pennsylvania, US

North Coventry Township
- Township
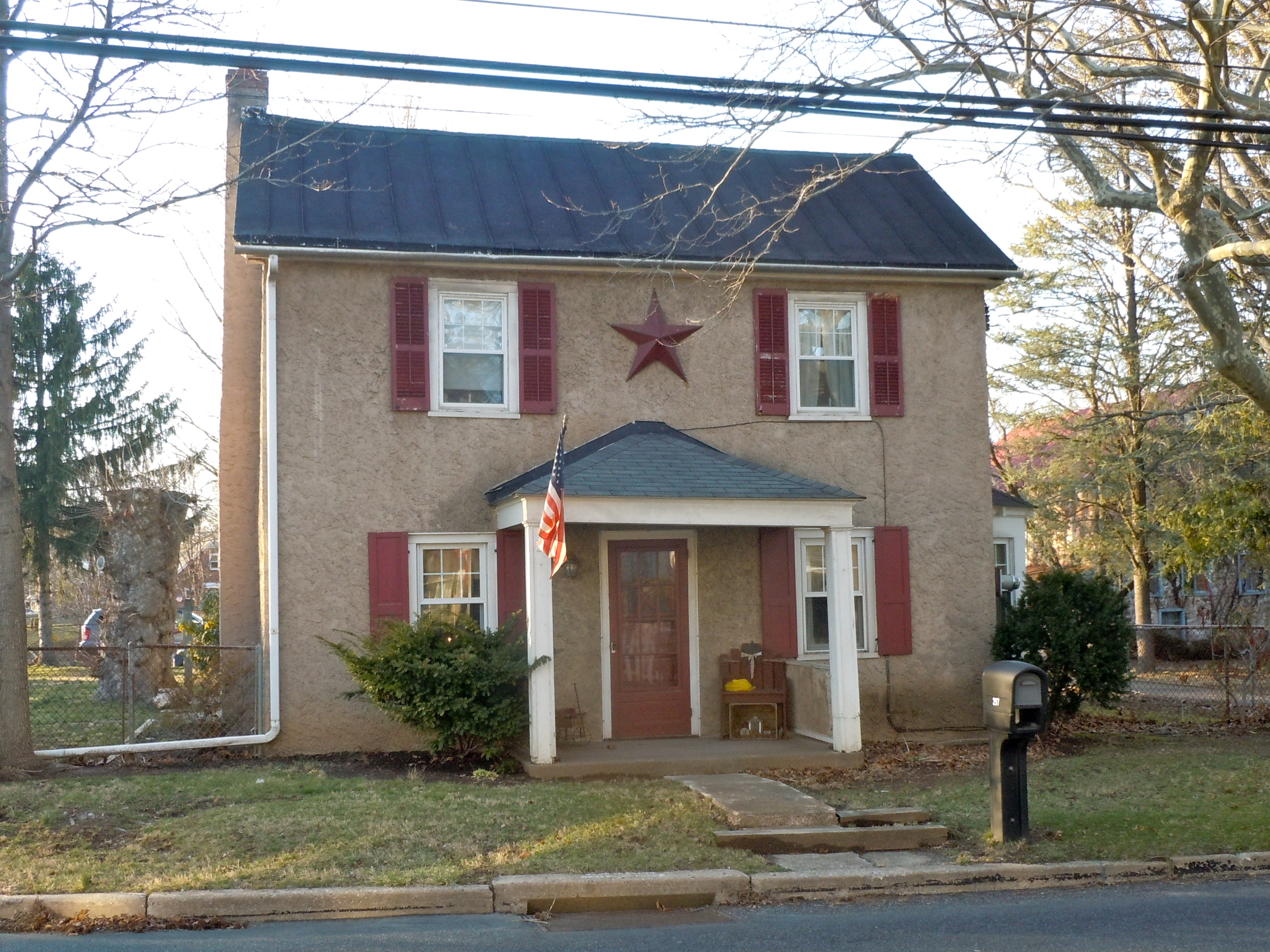
- House in Pottstown Landing

- Location in Chester County and the state of Pennsylvania.

- Location of Pennsylvania in the United States
- Coordinates: 40°13′33″N 75°39′52″W
- Country: United States
- State: Pennsylvania
- County: Chester

Area
  - Total: 13.51 sq mi (34.99 km^{2})
  - Land: 13.22 sq mi (34.25 km^{2})
  - Water: 0.29 sq mi (0.74 km^{2})
- Elevation: 299 ft (91 m)

Population (2010)
  - Total: 7,866
  - Estimate (2016): 7,983
  - Density: 603.7/sq mi (233.08/km^{2})
- Time zone: UTC-5 (EST)
  - Summer (DST): UTC-4 (EDT)
- Area code: 610
- FIPS code: 42-029-54936
- Website: northcoventrytownship.com

North Coventry Township is a township in Chester County, Pennsylvania, United States. The population was 7,866 at the 2010 census.

== History ==
The township derives its name from Coventry, England, the native home of an early settler.

The Pottstown Landing Historic District was listed on the National Register of Historic Places in 2001.

== Geography ==
According to the United States Census Bureau, the township has a total area of 13.6 square miles (35 km^{2}), of which 13.4 square miles (35 km^{2}) is land and 0.2 square miles (0.52 km^{2}), or 1.18%, is water. It is drained by the Schuylkill River, which forms its natural northern boundary with Montgomery County. Its unincorporated communities include Cedarville, Cold Spring Park, Kenilworth, Pottstown Landing, Schenkel, South Pottstown, and Titlow Corner. The township is partially located in the Hopewell Big Woods.

=== Neighboring municipalities ===
- East Coventry Township (east)
- South Coventry Township (south)
- Warwick Township (southwest)
- Union Township, Berks County (northwest)
- Douglass Township, Berks County (tangent to the north)
- West Pottsgrove Township, Montgomery County (north)
- Pottstown, Montgomery County (north)
- Lower Pottsgrove Township, Montgomery County (northeast)

=== Climate ===
The township has a hot-summer humid continental climate (Dfa) and average monthly temperatures in the vicinity of Coventry Mall range from 30.9 °F in January to 75.5 °F in July. The hardiness zone is 6b except near the river where it is 7a.

== Demographics ==
Historical population
Census	Pop.	Note	%±
1930	2,837		—
1940	3,030		6.8%
1950	3,242		7.0%
1960	4,367		34.7%
1970	6,690		53.2%
1980	7,164		7.1%
1990	7,506		4.8%
2000	7,381		−1.7%
2010	7,866		6.6%
2020	8,441		7.3%

At the 2010 census, the township was 92.3% non-Hispanic White, 2.7% Black or African American, 0.2% Native American, 1.2% Asian, and 1.6% were two or more races. 2.3% of the population were of Hispanic or Latino ancestry.

As of the census of 2000, there were 7,381 people, 3,012 households, and 2,111 families residing in the township. The population density was 550.7 inhabitants per square mile (212.6/km^{2}). There were 3,114 housing units at an average density of 232.4 per square mile (89.7/km^{2}). The racial makeup of the township was 96.19% White, 1.79% African American, 0.20% Native American, 0.83% Asian, 0.28% from other races, and 0.70% from two or more races. Hispanic or Latino of any race were 0.91% of the population.

There were 3,012 households, out of which 28.9% had children under the age of 18 living with them, 58.9% were married couples living together, 8.2% had a female householder with no husband present, and 29.9% were non-families. 24.6% of all households were made up of individuals, and 8.0% had someone living alone who was 65 years of age or older. The average household size was 2.45 and the average family size was 2.95.

In the township the population was spread out, with 22.1% under the age of 18, 7.5% from 18 to 24, 28.8% from 25 to 44, 27.4% from 45 to 64, and 14.2% who were 65 years of age or older. The median age was 40 years. For every 100 females there were 98.4 males. For every 100 females age 18 and over, there were 97.0 males.

The median income for a household in the township was $51,954, and the median income for a family was $64,596. Males had a median income of $44,315 versus $30,635 for females. The per capita income for the township was $25,418. About 3.2% of families and 4.5% of the population were below the poverty line, including 5.4% of those under age 18 and 1.2% of those age 65 or over.

== School district ==
North Coventry Township is served by the Owen J. Roberts School District. Owen J. Roberts High School is the zoned comprehensive high school.

== Transportation ==
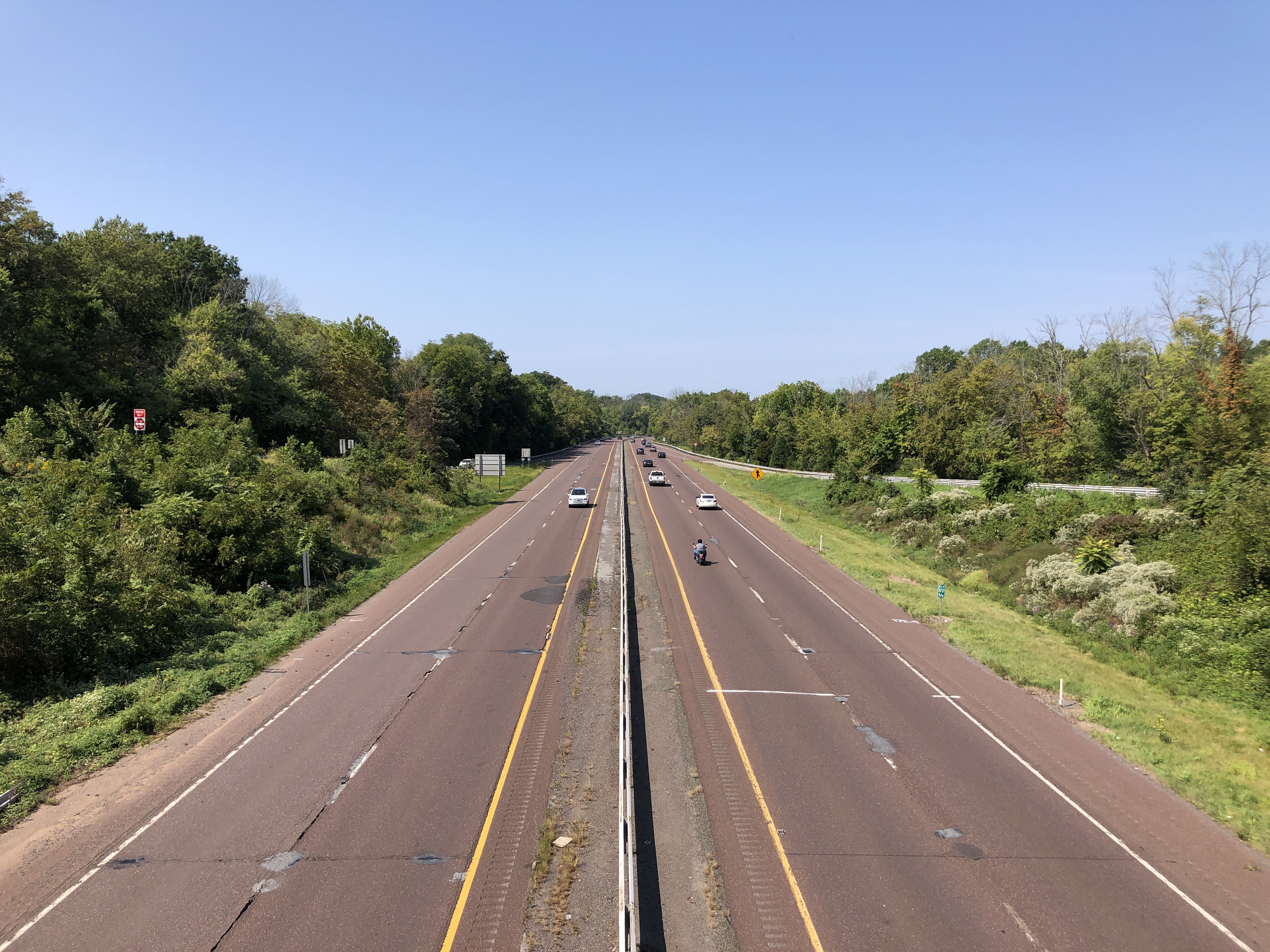
US 422 westbound in North Coventry Township

As of 2019, there were 64.81 miles (104.30 km) of public roads in North Coventry Township, of which 21.16 miles (34.05 km) were maintained by the Pennsylvania Department of Transportation (PennDOT) and 43.65 miles (70.25 km) were maintained by the township.

U.S. Route 422 is the most prominent highway serving North Coventry Township. It follows the Pottstown Expressway along an southeast-northwest alignment across the northeastern portion of the township. Pennsylvania Route 100 follows the Pottstown Pike along a north-south alignment across the eastern part of the township. Finally, Pennsylvania Route 724 follows Schuylkill Road along an east-west alignment across the northern portion of the township.

== Notable people ==
Notable people from North Coventry Township include Iowa State Senator J. Morris Rea, who was born there, as was Congressman Irving Price Wanger. Daryl Hall of Hall & Oates is from Cedarville in North Coventry.
