= West Vincent Township, Pennsylvania =

Township in Pennsylvania, US

West Vincent Township
- Township
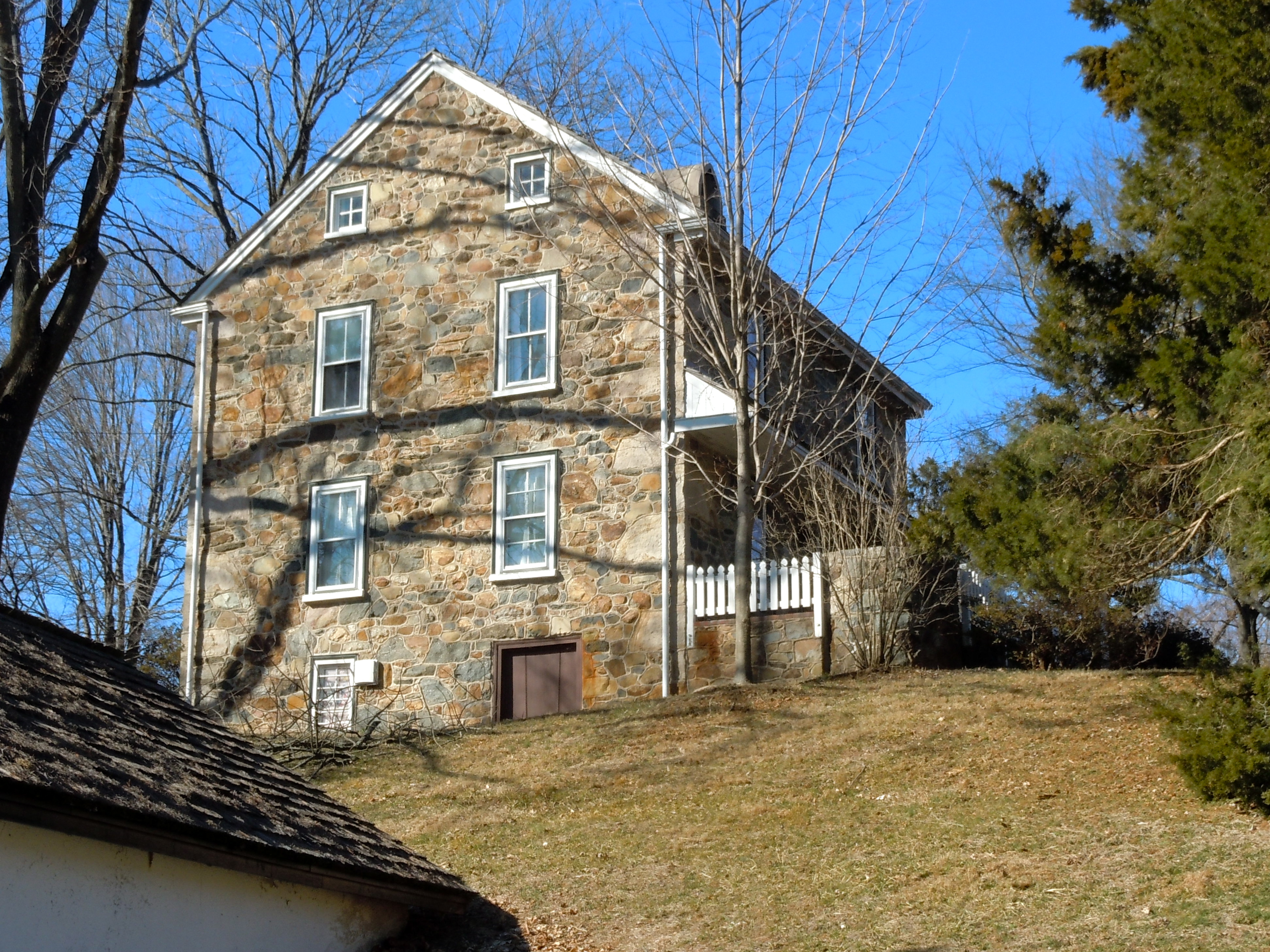
- Deery Family Homestead

- Location in Chester County and the state of Pennsylvania

- Location of Pennsylvania in the United States
- Coordinates: 40°07′43″N 75°38′38″W
- Country: United States
- State: Pennsylvania
- County: Chester

Area
  - Total: 17.84 sq mi (46.21 km^{2})
  - Land: 17.68 sq mi (45.78 km^{2})
  - Water: 0.16 sq mi (0.42 km^{2})
- Elevation: 325 ft (99 m)

Population (2010)
  - Total: 4,567
  - Estimate (2016): 5,084
  - Density: 287.6/sq mi (111.04/km^{2})
- Time zone: UTC-5 (EST)
  - Summer (DST): UTC-4 (EDT)
- Area code: 610
- FIPS code: 42-029-84160

West Vincent Township is a township in Chester County, Pennsylvania, United States. The population was 4,567 at the 2010 census.

== History ==
The township was named after Sir Mathias Vincent. West Vincent was formed in 1832 when Vincent Township was divided. The remainder of Vincent Township became East Vincent.

The Birchrunville General Store, Birchrunville Historic District, Deery Family Homestead, Nicholas East House, French Creek Farm, Robert Rooke House, and Strickland-Roberts Homestead are listed on the National Register of Historic Places.

== Geography ==
According to the U.S. Census Bureau, the township has a total area of 17.8 square miles (46 km^{2}), of which 0.04 square miles (0.10 km^{2}), or 0.22%, is water. West Vincent Township is divided from East Vincent Township by French Creek; these two townships were combined as Vincent Township until 1832. The township is partially located in the Hopewell Big Woods. An interesting feature of West Vincent Township is its missing quarte". In 1715, founder Sir Mathias Vincent and others failed to pay taxes to William Penn, who took them to court. In the end, 467 acres (1.89 km^{2}) in southern West Vincent Township were seized and given to Upper Uwchlan Township. This is shown in modern days by Pennsylvania Route 401, which, while travelling straight, leaves this township but soon re-enters it.

== Demographics ==
Historical population
Census	Pop.	Note	%±
1930	831		—
1940	808		−2.8%
1950	1,116		38.1%
1960	1,431		28.2%
1970	1,890		32.1%
1980	1,992		5.4%
1990	2,262		13.6%
2000	3,170		40.1%
2010	4,567		44.1%
2020	6,668		46.0%

As of the 2010 census, the township was 93.9% non-Hispanic White, 1.1% Black or African American, 0.1% Native American, 2.1% Asian, and 0.9% were two or more races. 1.9% of the population were of Hispanic or Latino ancestry.

As of the 2000 census, there were 3,170 people, 1,077 households, and 872 families residing in the township. The population density was 178.6 inhabitants per square mile (69.0/km^{2}). There were 1,121 housing units at an average density of 63.2 per square mile (24.4/km^{2}). The racial makeup of the township was 97.79% White, 0.60% African American, 0.13% Native American, 0.66% Asian, 0.03% Pacific Islander, 0.06% from other races, and 0.73% from two or more races. Hispanic or Latino of any race were 0.57% of the population.

There were 1,077 households, out of which 38.8% had children under the age of 18 living with them, 73.5% were married couples living together, 4.6% had a female householder with no husband present, and 19.0% were non-families. 14.0% of all households were made up of individuals, and 4.2% had someone living alone who was 65 years of age or older. The average household size was 2.84 and the average family size was 3.15.

In the township, the population was spread out, with 28.1% under the age of 18, 3.6% from 18 to 24, 29.8% from 25 to 44, 28.4% from 45 to 64, and 10.1% who were 65 years of age or older. The median age was 40 years. For every 100 females, there were 102.0 males. For every 100 females age 18 and over, there were 99.0 males.

The median income for a household in the township was $92,024, and the median income for a family was $106,223. Males had a median income of $70,670 versus $42,371 for females. The per capita income for the township was $43,500. About 3.2% of families and 6.8% of the population were below the poverty line, including 5.9% of those under age 18 and 6.8% of those age 65 or over.

== Weatherstone ==
Weatherstone is a housing development built by the Hankin Group located at the intersection of PA Route 100 and PA Route 401 (Ludwigs Corner). It contains about 270 homes and the Hankin Library. Construction started in 2002. The original plans called for a retail development as well. As of 2017, the land still remains vacant, but plans have not been abandoned.

== Education ==
West Vincent is within the Owen J. Roberts School District. Owen J. Roberts High School is the zoned comprehensive high school.

Henrietta Hankin Branch of the Chester County Library System is in the township.

== Transportation ==
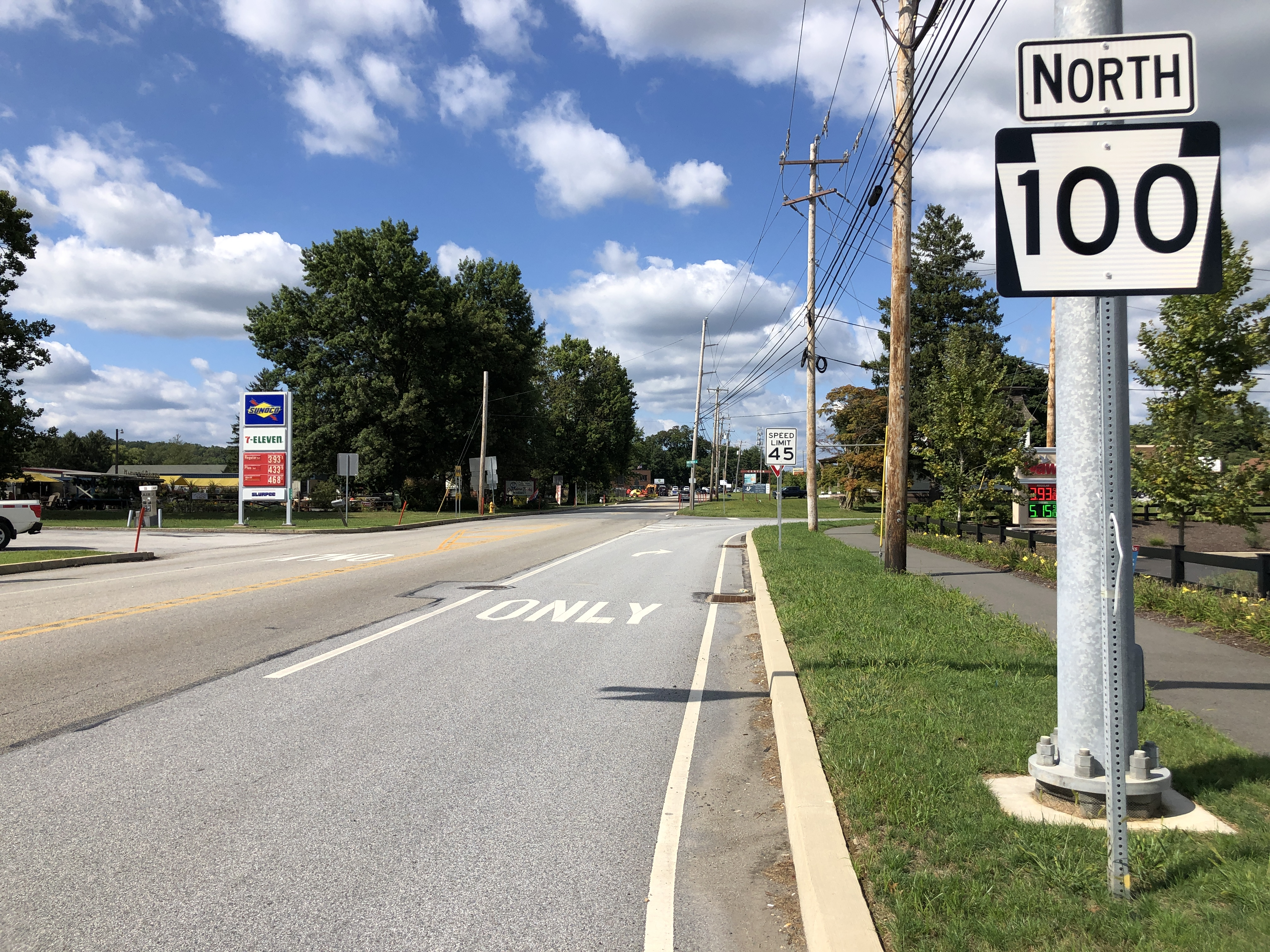
PA Route 100 northbound in West Vincent Township

As of 2021, there were 69.13 miles (111.25 km) of public roads in West Vincent Township, of which 18.38 miles (29.58 km) were maintained by the Pennsylvania Department of Transportation (PennDOT) and 50.75 miles (81.67 km) were maintained by the township.

Pennsylvania Route 100 and Pennsylvania Route 401 are the numbered roads serving West Vincent Township. PA 100 follows Pottstown Pike along a north-south alignment across the southwestern corner of the township. PA 401 follows Conestoga Road along a northwest-southeast alignment across the southern and western portions of the township.

== Notable people ==
- Graceanna Lewis (1821–1912) American naturalist, suffragist, and anti-slavery activist, was born in West Vincent Township.
- Charles Lewis Fussell (1840–1909) American landscape painter was born in West Vincent Township.
- Henry Shimer (1828–1895) entomologist, instructor and physician at Shimer College, was born in West Vincent Township.
- Owen J. Roberts (1875–1955) Associate Justice of the U.S. Supreme Court, purchased the Strickland-Roberts Homestead in West Vincent Township in 1927, and died there in 1955.
