= Franklin Ely Atwood =

American politician, lawyer and judge (1878–1943)

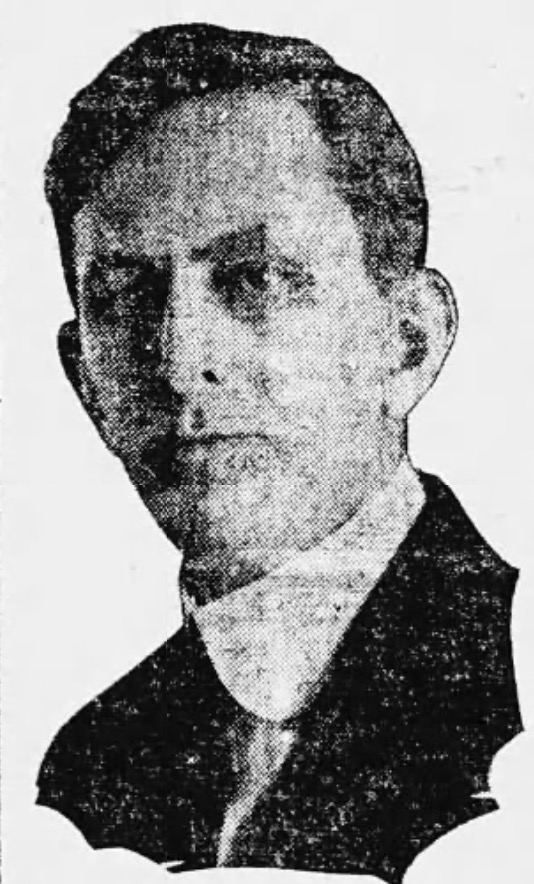

Justice of the Supreme Court of Missouri
- In office November 1924 – 1934

Chief Justice of the Supreme Court of Missouri
- In office June 23, 1931 – November 26, 1932

Personal details
- Born: October 5, 1878 Carrollton, Missouri, US
- Died: March 5, 1943 (aged 64) Carrollton, Missouri, US
- Party: Republican
- Relations: Frank B. Atwood (grandfather)
- Occupation: Politician, lawyer, judge

Franklin Ely Atwood (October 5, 1878 – March 5, 1943) was an American politician, lawyer, and judge. A Republican, he was a justice of the Supreme Court of Missouri from 1924 to 1934.

== Early life and education ==
Atwood was born on October 5, 1878, in Carrollton, Missouri, the eldest of six children. His grandfather, Frank B. Atwood, was a member of the Missouri General Assembly. In 1898, he matriculated at the University of Missouri, later transferring to William Jewell College and graduating with a Bachelor of Arts and a Master of Arts. While in college, he was a member of Phi Delta Phi and Phi Gamma Delta.

== Career ==
Atwood read law under Lozier & Morris, being admitted to the bar in 1904, after which he partnered with them. In 1911, he left the partnership and spent several years in independent practice. He then partnered with his brother, Smith B. Atwood, a partnership he returned to after his tenure as judge.

Atwood later moved to Jefferson City, where he was assistant counsel of the Missouri Public Service Commission for two years. He was a justice of the Supreme Court of Missouri, from November 1924 to 1934. From June 23, 1931, to November 26, 1932, he served as chief justice of the court, as part of a rotating appointment to the office among the justices, holding the office for one seventh of his term. At times, he was considered for promotion to the Supreme Court of the United States. He unsuccessfully ran for judge again in 1940.

Atwood was a Republican, and ideologically was liberal. He was frequently a legal aide to Forrest C. Donnell, helping him in the 1940 Missouri gubernatorial election.

== Personal life and death ==
Atwood married Agnes Rea Luscombe; they had no children together. He was Baptist, as well as a member of the American Judicature Society, the Freemasons, and the Order of the Coif. He died on March 5, 1943, aged 64, in Carrollton, from coronary thrombosis, and was buried at Oak Hill Cemetery, in Carrollton. An archive of his papers is held by the State Historical Society of Missouri.
