= Pottstown Landing Historic District =

Historic district in Pennsylvania, United States

- U.S. National Register of Historic Places
- U.S. Historic district
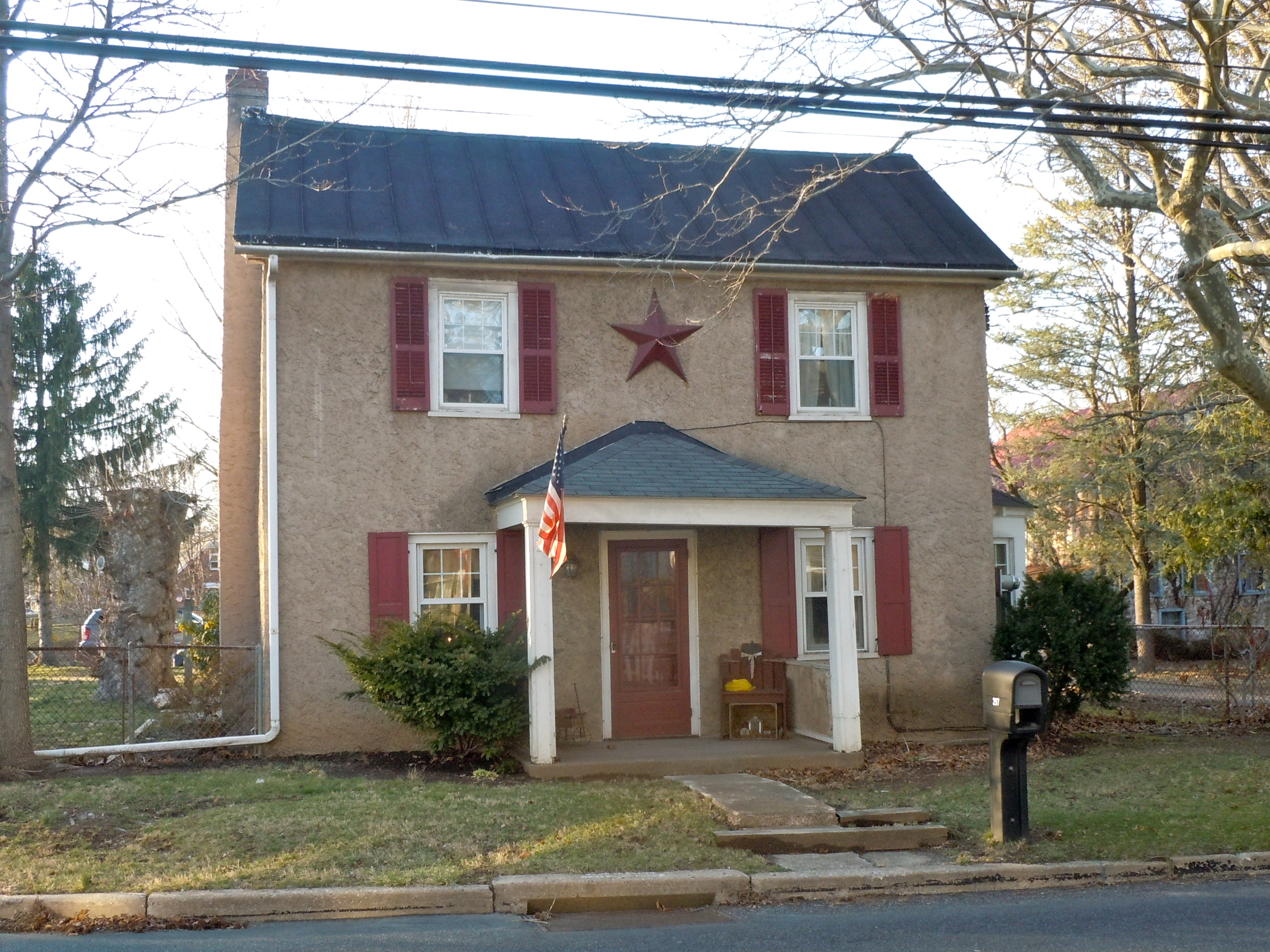
- House in the Pottstown Landing Historic District, March 2011

- Location within Pennsylvania Location within the United States
- Location: Roughly bounded by US 422 By-Pass, Whartnaby St. 633 Laurelwood Rd. and Reiff St., North Coventry Township, Pennsylvania
- Coordinates: 40°14′17″N 75°39′51″W
- Area: 21.9 acres (8.9 ha)
- Built by: Kerlin, Daniel; Ecker A., et
- Architectural style: Late Victorian, Late 19th And Early 20th Century American Movements
- NRHP reference No.: 01000927
- Added to NRHP: August 31, 2001

The Pottstown Landing Historic District is a national historic district that is located in North Coventry Township, Chester County, Pennsylvania.

It was added to the National Register of Historic Places in 2001.

== History and architectural features ==
This district includes seventy-six contributing buildings and one contributing site that are located in the linear village of Pottstown Landing. The buildings date from the eighteenth to the twentieth centuries and primarily include residential buildings. Also included are a number of contributing outbuildings, a school, and a church. The oldest buildings are associated with the Joseph Rieff stone farmhouse (c. 1780). The village developed along the banks of the Schuylkill River and increased after the opening of the Schuylkill Canal.
