= Cedarville, Pennsylvania =

Unincorporated community in Pennsylvania, US

- Unincorporated community
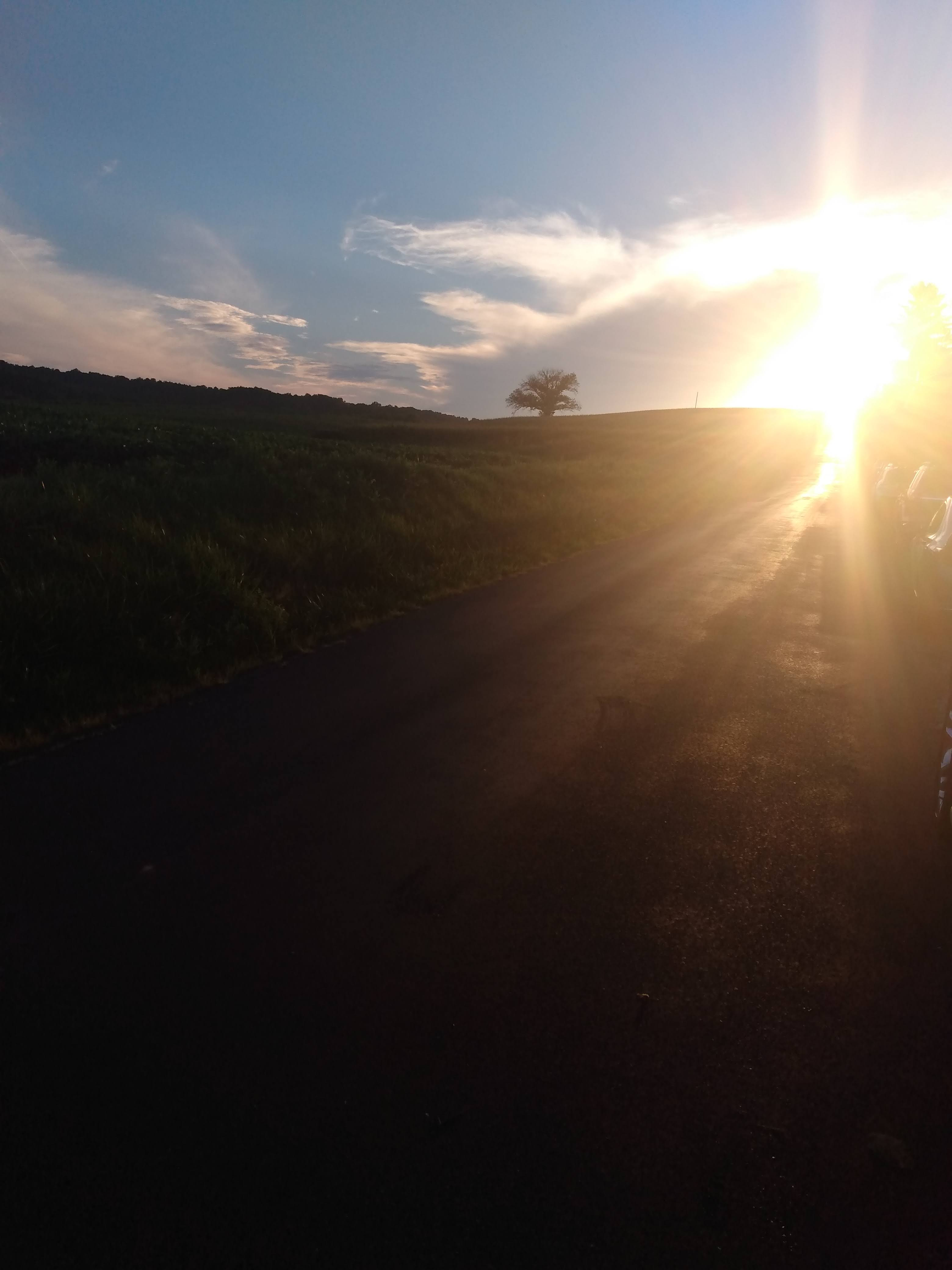

- Location within Pennsylvania Location within the United States
- Coordinates: 40°13′37″N 75°40′18″W
- Country: United States
- State: Pennsylvania
- County: Chester
- Township: North Coventry
- Elevation: 269 ft (82 m)
- Time zone: UTC-5 (Eastern (EST))
  - Summer (DST): UTC-4 (EDT)
- Area codes: 610 and 484
- GNIS feature ID: 1171408

Cedarville is an unincorporated community in North Coventry Township in Chester County, Pennsylvania, United States. Originally called Stumptown, in 1878 the Postal Service changed the name of the local post office to Cedarville due to its location in a cedar forest.
