= Strickland-Roberts Homestead =

Historic house in Pennsylvania, United States

- U.S. National Register of Historic Places
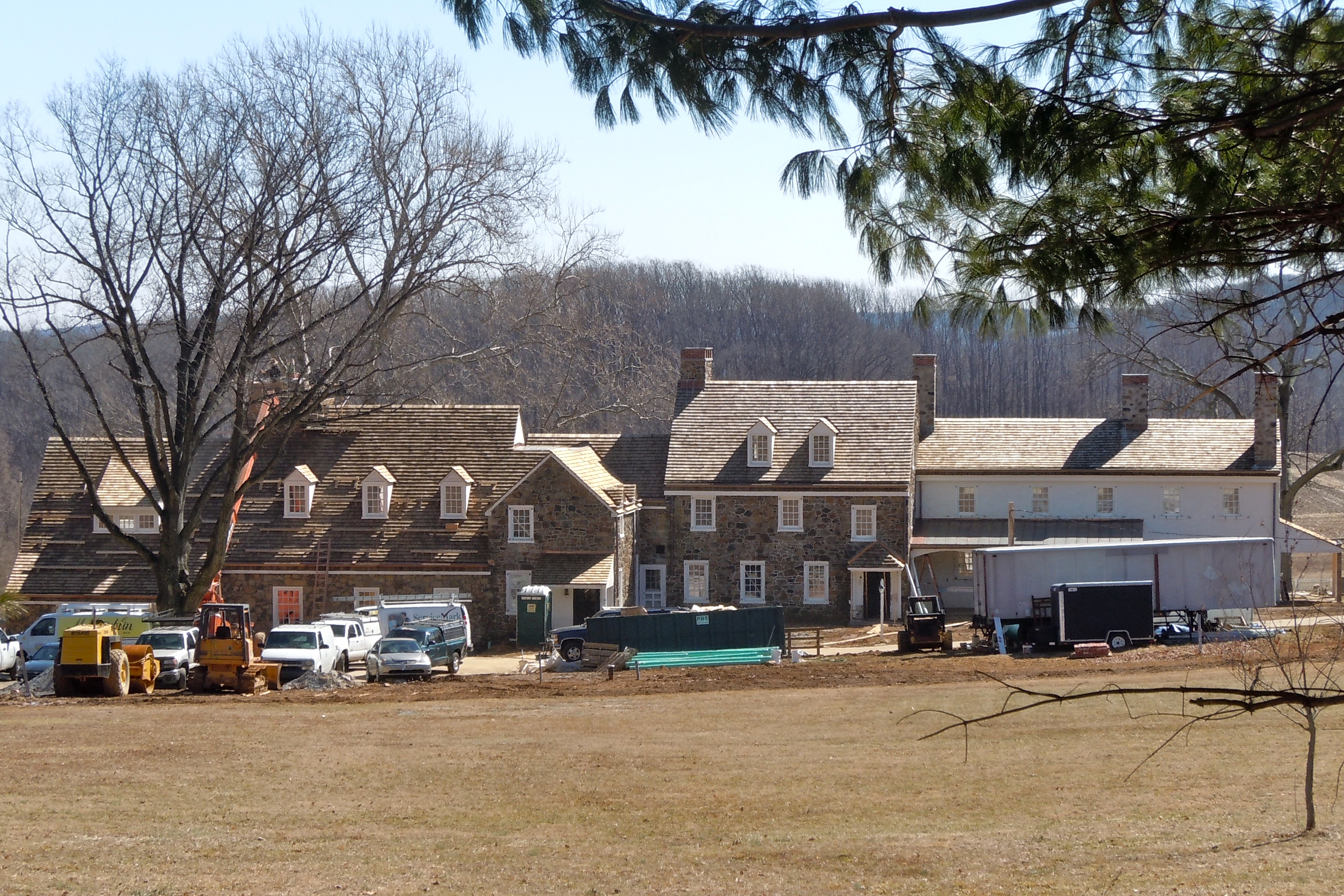
- Strickland-Roberts Homestead, March 2011

- Location within Pennsylvania Location within the United States
- Location: 3 miles (4.8 km) south of Kimberton on St. Matthews Road, West Vincent Township, Pennsylvania
- Coordinates: 40°7′20″N 75°38′6″W
- Area: 3.5 acres (1.4 ha)
- Built: c. 1800, 1873, 1929
- NRHP reference No.: 78002372
- Added to NRHP: January 30, 1978

The Strickland-Roberts Homestead, also known as the Bryncoed Farm, is an historic home in West Vincent Township, Pennsylvania, United States.

It was added to the National Register of Historic Places in 1978.

== History architectural features ==
The original section of this historic structure dates to circa 1800, and is a two-story, five-bay by one-bay, fieldstone structure. It has a gable roof, a small shed-roofed porch, and a terrace. A 2 1/2-story, four-bay, random fieldstone addition was designed by R. Brognard Okie and built in 1929.

Also located on the property is a contributing bank barn that dates to 1873. The house was purchased by future U.S. Supreme Court Justice Owen J. Roberts in 1927; he died here in 1955.
