= Thomas William Moseley =

Thomas William Henry Harrison Moseley (November 28, 1813 – March 10, 1880) was a builder and designer of wrought-iron arch bridges. He is best known for his "Wrought-Iron Lattice Girder Bridge" patent of August 30, 1870. The only known surviving example of this type of bridge structure is the Hares Hill Road Bridge located in Chester County, Pennsylvania.

== Biography ==
Thomas W.H. Moseley was born near Mt. Sterling, Kentucky on November 28, 1813. He died in Scranton, Pennsylvania on March 10, 1880. He was referred to at times as "Gen. Moseley" because of his time as state adjutant-general in Ohio in the 1840s to early 1850s. He got started in business in Cincinnati, Ohio in the 1850s, which is when Zenas King was on board. By 1861, T.W.H Moseley had made his move to Boston, Massachusetts, and Zenas King started his own company in Cleveland, Ohio. By the early 1870s Thomas Moseley was living in Pennsylvania; Philadelphia first, then in Scranton.

== Patents ==
| Patent No | Patent Date | Inventor Name /City, State | Description /Significance | Example /Type | Ref. Link |
|---|---|---|---|---|---|
| 16572 | February 3, 1857 | Thomas Moseley /Boston, Massachusetts | Outlines distinctive details in remaining Moseley bowstring truss bridges. | Hares Hill Bridge | |
| 59054 | October 23, 1866 | Thomas Moseley /Boston, Massachusetts | Outlines distinctive details in remaining Moseley bowstring truss bridges. | Hares Hill Bridge | |
| 103765 | May 31, 1870 | Thomas Moseley /Boston, Massachusetts | Outlines distinctive details in remaining Moseley bowstring truss bridges. | Hares Hill Bridge | |
| cont'd | cont'd | cont'd | cont'd | cont'd | cont'd |

== Moseley Iron Bridge and Roof Company ==
The Moseley Iron Bridge Company was founded by Moseley in Cincinnati, Ohio around 1858 and existed until 1879. John Paul Verree used T.W.H. Moseley's designs for his bridge manufacturing business in Philadelphia, Pennsylvania.

Zenas King was hired by Moseley as a salesperson and represented Moseley at many bridge lettings, mainly in southern Ohio. King remained in Ohio and started his own bridge building business in Cleveland. In 1861, Moseley decided to move the company to Boston, Massachusetts. Moseley moved his business to Boston when he discovered marketing his iron bridge designs were ideal for areas in the New England area. The company was also known as the Moseley Iron Bridge Works of Boston.

The company changed names and locations several times between 1858 and 1879, including Philadelphia and New York.

=== Known Moseley bridges ===
- Railroad Bridge (1858)—Formerly spanning Sterrns Creek north of Ironton, removed and placed on exhibition in the Henry Ford Museum in Dearborn, Michigan.
- Murphy Road Bridge (c.1860)—Formerly spanning Walloomsac River, moved in 1958 to Bennington Museum, Bennington, Vermont; Thomas W.H. Moseley, designer, Moseley Iron Building Works, Boston, builder
- Upper Pacific Mills Bridge (1864)—North Canal, Lawrence, Massachusetts; Thowas W. Moseley, designer, Moseley Iron Building Works, Boston, builder
- Hare's Hill Road Bridge (1869)—Hare's Hill Road over French Creek, Kimberton, Pennsylvania; Thomas W. Moseley, designer, Moseley Iron Bridge & Roof Company, builder
- Monadnock Mills Bridge (1870)—Workers' access to Monadnock Mills, Claremont, New Hampshire; Thomas W. Moseley, designer, Moseley Iron Bridge & Roof Company, builder

== See also ==
- Hares Hill Road Bridge
- Moseley Wrought Iron Arch Bridge
