= Hares Hill Road Bridge =

Historic bridge in Pennsylvania

Hares Hill Road Bridge over French Creek
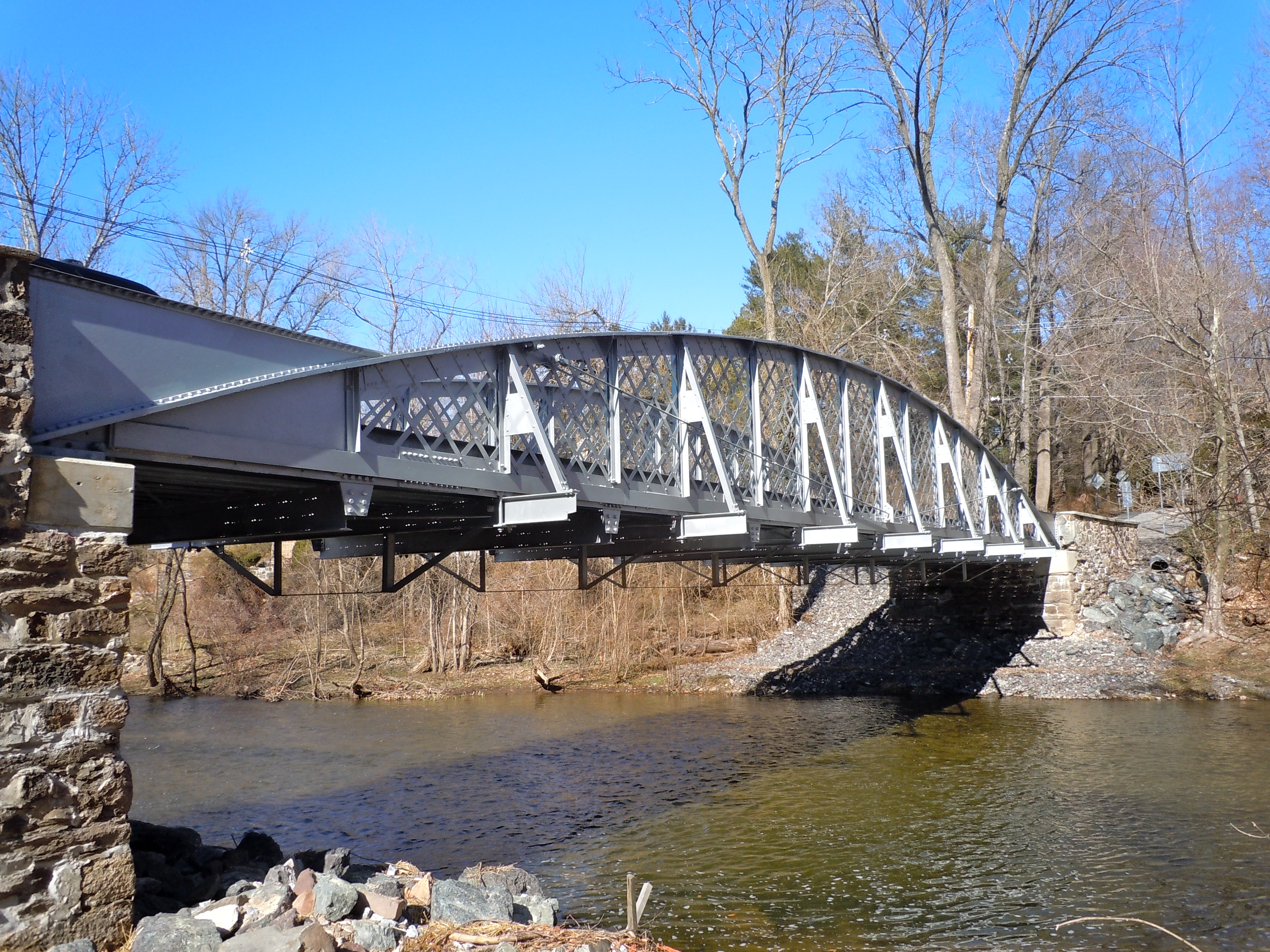
- View to the north, 2011
- Coordinates: 40°08′28″N 75°34′05″W
- Carries: Single lane of SR 1045 in Chester County
- Crosses: French Creek
- Locale: Kimberton, Pennsylvania, and Phoenixville, Pennsylvania
- Official name: SR 1045 Hares Hill Bridge
- Other name: Silver Bridge
- Maintained by: PennDOT
- ID number: 15104500201201

Characteristics
- Design: wrought iron through lattice girder
- Total length: 103 ft 4 in (31.50 m)
- Width: 14 ft (4.3 m)

History
- Opened: 1869

Statistics
- Daily traffic: average 4,895
- Hare's Hill Road Bridge
- U.S. National Register of Historic Places
- Location within Pennsylvania Location within the United States
- Nearest city: Phoenixville, Pennsylvania
- Coordinates: 40°8′28″N 75°34′4″W
- Area: 0.2 acres (0.08 ha)
- Built: 1867
- Architectural style: Bow string truss
- NRHP reference No.: 78002375
- Added to NRHP: March 28, 1978

The Hares Hill Road Bridge is a single-span, wrought iron, bowstring-shaped lattice girder bridge. It was built in 1869 by Moseley Iron Bridge and Roof Company and is the only known surviving example of this kind. The bridge spans French Creek, a Pennsylvania Scenic River.

== Description ==
The Hares Hill Road Bridge superstructure consists of one 103 feet 4 inches (31.50 m) wrought-iron lattice girder span. The ends are supported on stone masonry abutments built by Abraham Taney Jr., also in 1869. The bridge has been extensively rehabilitated several times, one of which added the current open grid steel deck. This is a single-lane bridge.

The structure is listed in the National Register of Historic Places and has a high degree of historical and technological significance: it is the only known surviving example of Thomas William Moseley’s patented "Wrought Iron Lattice Girder Bridge." The bridge has been recorded by the Historic American Engineering Record (HAER) with detailed drawings, photographs, and a historical narrative. The structure carries one lane of traffic on Hares Hill Road (unsigned State Route 1045) across French Creek. Residences are located along the north bank of French Creek and a wooded area runs along the south bank.

The abutments are founded on rock and consist of random rubble mortared sandstone. They are 20 feet (6.1 m) long, 7 feet (2.1 m) wide at the base, have a batter of 1/2 inch per foot (1:24), and are about 12 feet (3.7 m) high above low water. Concrete pedestals have replaced the original stone-bearing seats. Wing walls extend approximately 60 feet (18 m) with a slight flare on the south side. The north wings are about 20 feet (6.1 m) long.

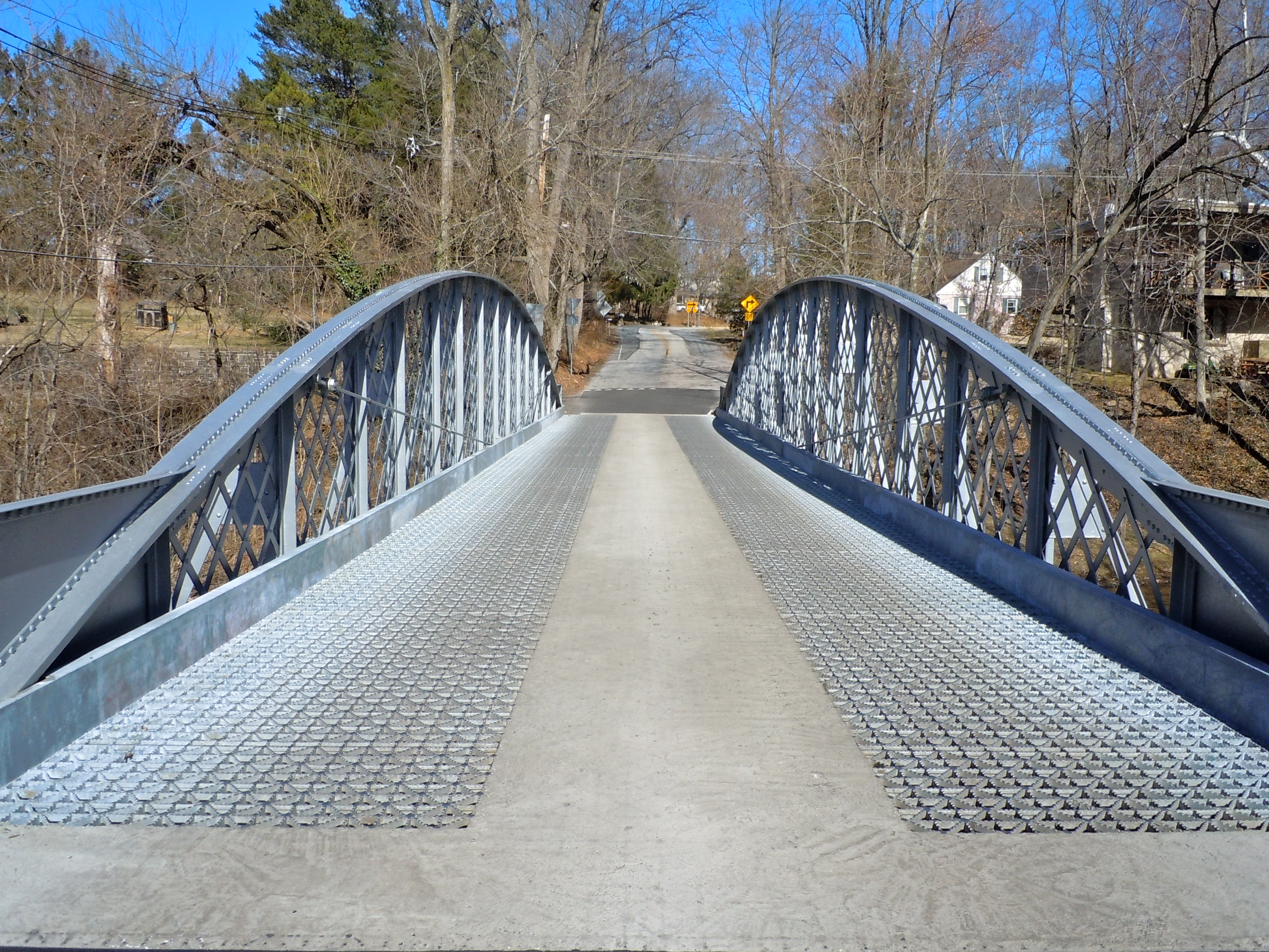
New deck on the bridge, 2011

The original superstructure consisted of the two wrought-iron arched girders with lattice webbing and a timber floor system. The arch girders are made up of a pair of Z-shaped bars riveted to a central plate diaphragm. Diagonal lattice members fill the web between the upper and lower portions of the plate. Each arch has seven vertical members that support the floor system, along with the lattice and bottom tie plate. Bowstring-type tie rods extend diagonally from the bottom of the center vertical on both sides of each arch.

The HAER narrative cites three major rehabilitation campaigns before 1991.

Known locally as the "Silver Bridge" due to its color, the bridge was yellow for at least a few decades. The bridge was returned to silver during rehabilitation in 2010.

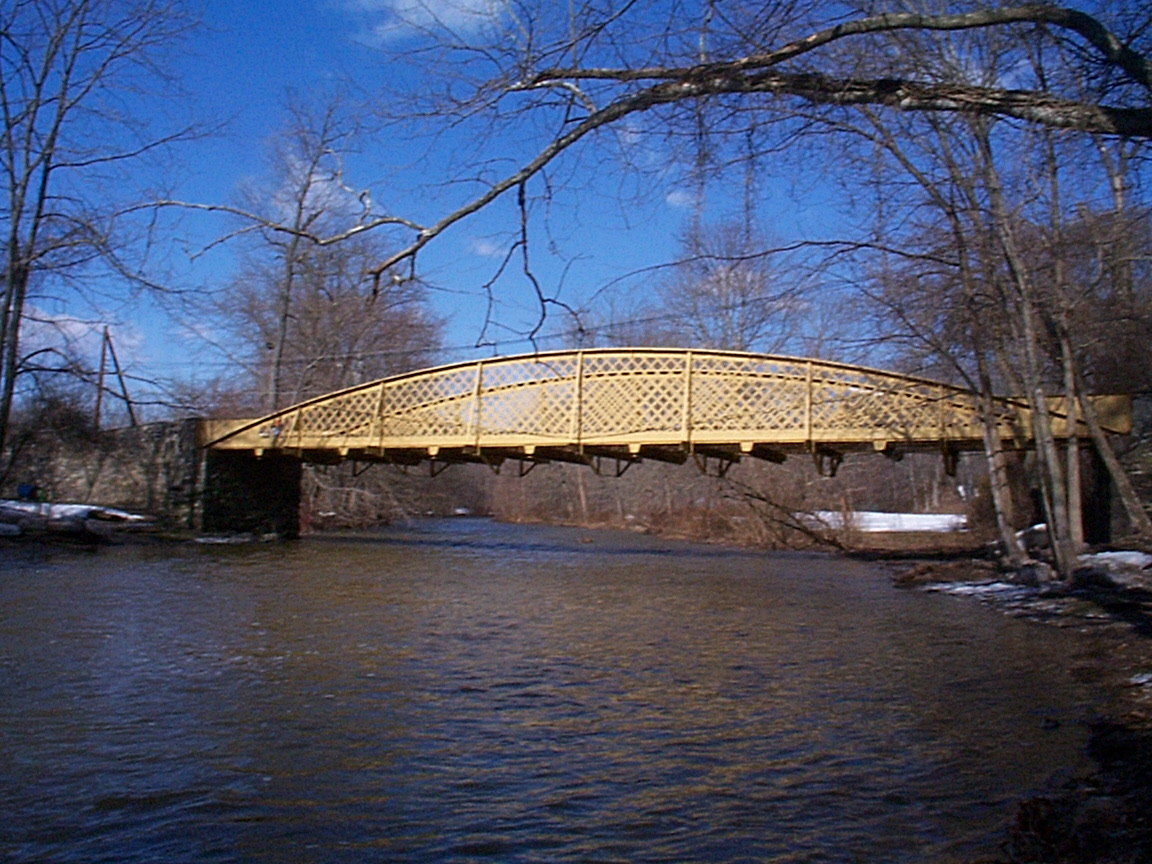
Yellow color, prior to 2010

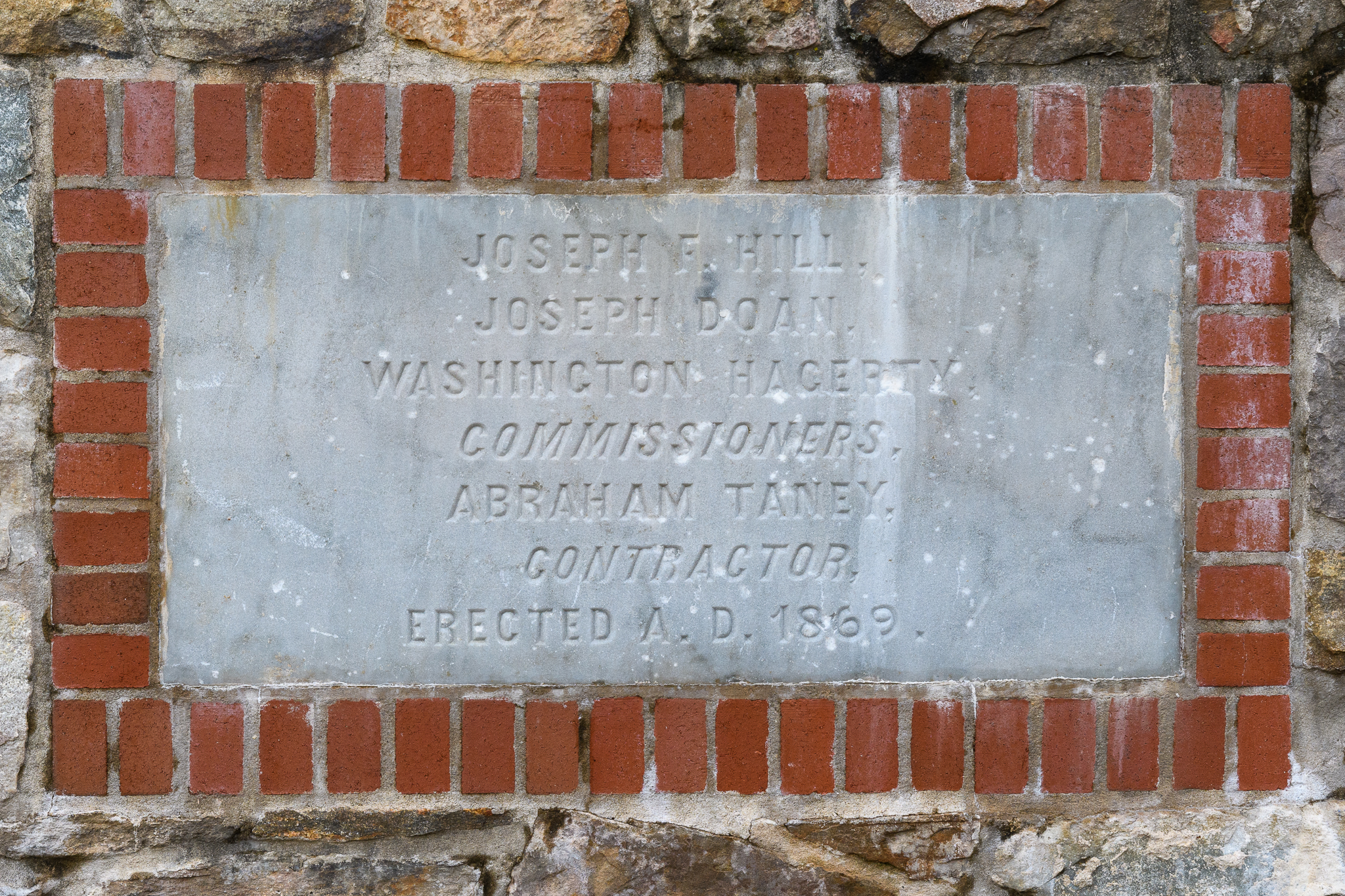
Historic plaque, reinstalled in 2018

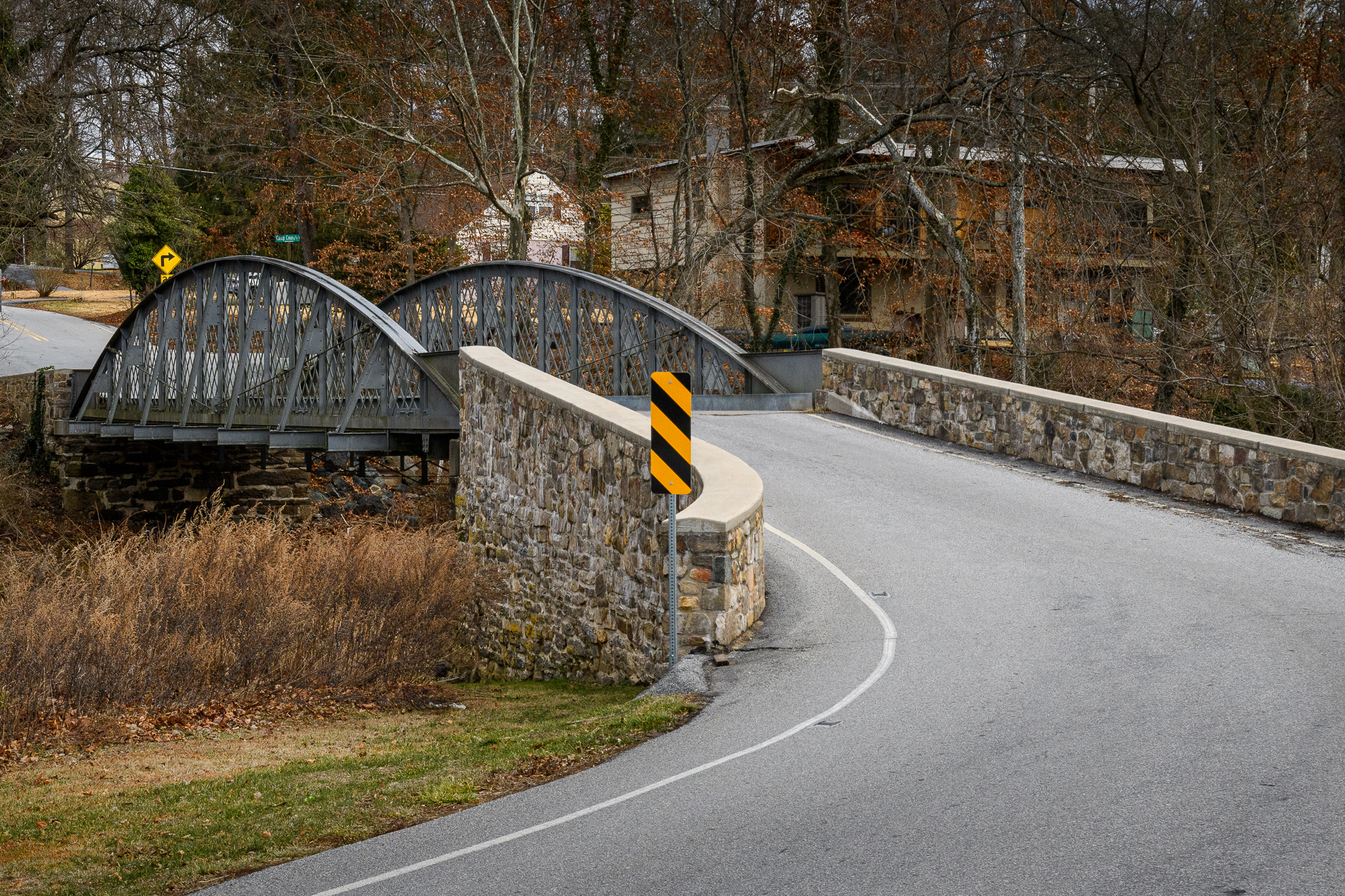
View from south showing the re-pointed abutments

In 2009, the Pennsylvania Department of Transportation (PennDOT) was programmed to spend $1.7 million to rehabilitate this bridge and improve its load capacity without interfering with its historical nature. On June 22, 2010, the bridge was closed for rehabilitation work including replacement of the open-grid steel deck with a new deck incorporating a concrete center section for bicycle use. The $826,689 restoration was expected to last until October 2010 and raise the load restriction to 15 tons (14 metric tons). The bridge was reopened on December 10, 2010.

On June 11, 2018, the bridge closed for approximately ten weeks for the latest rehabilitation. PennDOT's contractor worked to rehabilitate the wrought iron through truss bridge by reconstructing damaged and deteriorated wingwalls; reconstructing stone masonry parapets with reinforced concrete; and installing powder-coated brown guiderail to protect the blunt ends of the parapets. In addition, the conserved historic plaque on the outside of the southeast wingwall was re-installed. A plaque commemorating this 2018 rehabilitation was also installed. The bridge reopened August 20, 2018.

== See also ==
- East Pikeland Township, Pennsylvania
- Kimberton, Pennsylvania
- Zenas King
- List of bridges documented by the Historic American Engineering Record in Pennsylvania
- Moseley Wrought Iron Arch Bridge
