= Continental Powder Works at French Creek =

- U.S. National Register of Historic Places
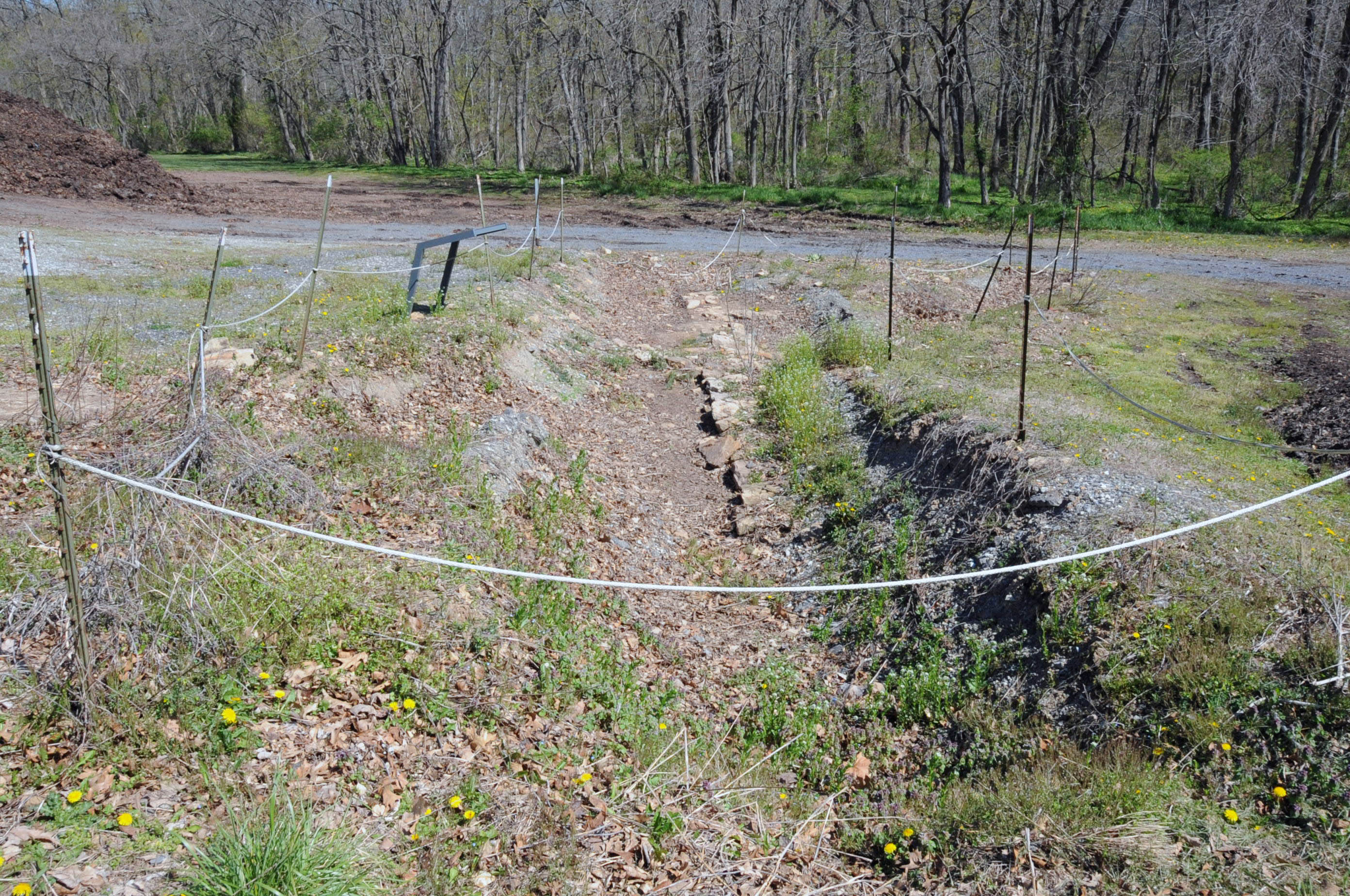

- Location within Pennsylvania Location within the United States
- Location: General area of Rapps Dam Rd. near Rapps Bridge, East Pikeland Township, PA 19442
- Coordinates: 40°08′17″N 75°33′11″W
- Built: 1776
- NRHP reference No.: 15000827
- Added to NRHP: November 24, 2015

The Continental Powder Works at French Creek is a historic gunpowder manufacturing complex in East Pikeland Township, Chester County, Pennsylvania. Constructed on French Creek in early 1776 and intended to supply the Continental Army during the American Revolutionary War, the mill was the only powder mill and gun factory commissioned by the Continental Congress. Designed to produce two tons of powder per week, the complex contained a dam, mill race, powder mill, graining mill, saltpeter house, four drying houses, powder magazine, a house for superintendent Peter De Haven, and barracks for militia guarding the facility. British troops burned the complex in September 1777, but the site continued to be used as a mill into the 1800s.

Largely consisting of ruins, the site was listed on the National Register of Historic Places on November 24, 2015.

== See also ==
- National Register of Historic Places listings in northern Chester County, Pennsylvania
