= Rapps Bridge =

- U.S. National Register of Historic Places
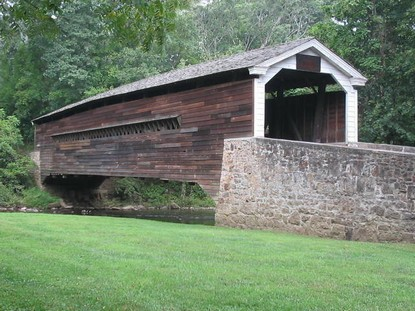
- Rapps Bridge, June 2007

- Location within Pennsylvania Location within the United States
- Location: Rapps Dam Road off of Route 23, East Pikeland Township, Pennsylvania
- Coordinates: 40.13826°N 75.55286°W
- Area: 2 acres (0.81 ha)
- Built: 1866
- Built by: Benjamin F. Hartman
- Architectural style: Burr truss
- MPS: Covered Bridges of Chester County TR (AD)
- NRHP reference No.: 73001608
- Added to NRHP: June 18, 1973

Rapps Bridge, also known as Rapps Dam Bridge, is one of fifteen surviving historic wooden covered bridges in Chester County, Pennsylvania. Rapps Bridge is located on Rapps Dam Road in East Pikeland Township.

It was listed on the National Register of Historic Places in 1973.

== History and notable features ==
This bridge is a 105-foot-long (32 m), Burr truss bridge that was constructed in 1866 by Benjamin F. Hartman. It has fieldstone abutments, horizontal siding and boxed cornices with returns at its portals.

It is one of three covered bridges that cross French Creek, the others being Hall's Bridge and Kennedy Bridge.

The Rapps Bridge was renovated in 1978 and again in 2011 for approximately 1.5 million dollars.

On April 29, 2014, the bridge was heavily damaged when a tractor trailer crossed it. It re-opened in October 2015.
