= East Pikeland Township, Pennsylvania =

Township in Pennsylvania, US

East Pikeland Township
- Township
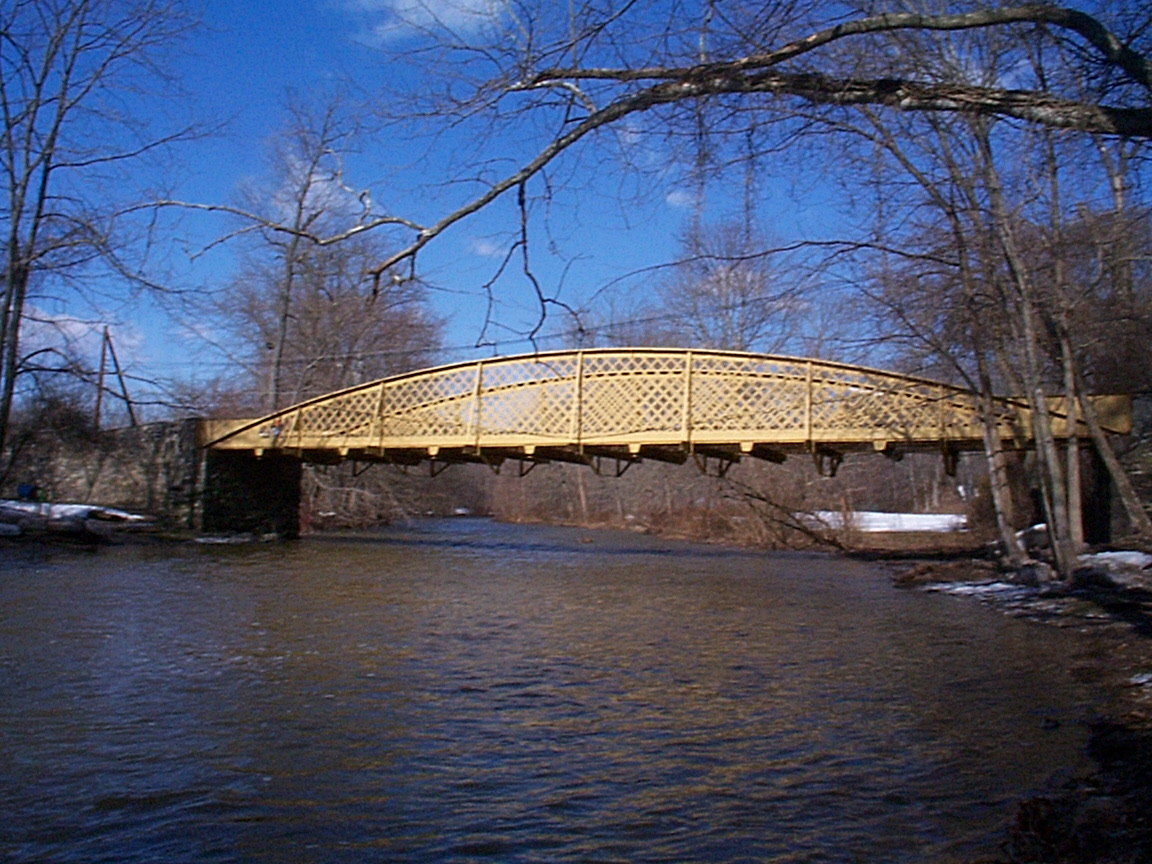
- Hares Hill Road Bridge

- Seal

- Location in Chester County and the state of Pennsylvania.

- Location of Pennsylvania in the United States
- Coordinates: 40°07′20″N 75°34′02″W
- Country: United States
- State: Pennsylvania
- County: Chester
- Settled: 1682

Area
  - Total: 8.90 sq mi (23.04 km^{2})
  - Land: 8.74 sq mi (22.63 km^{2})
  - Water: 0.16 sq mi (0.41 km^{2})
- Elevation: 236 ft (72 m)

Population (2010)
  - Total: 7,079
  - Estimate (2016): 7,323
  - Density: 838.1/sq mi (323.61/km^{2})
- Time zone: UTC-5 (EST)
  - Summer (DST): UTC-4 (EDT)
- Area code: 610
- FIPS code: 42-029-21696
- Website: http://www.eastpikeland.org

East Pikeland Township is a township in Chester County, Pennsylvania, United States. The population was 7,079 at the 2010 census.

== History ==
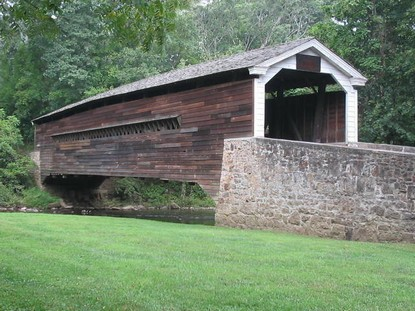
Rapps Bridge

Pike's Land was the first name given to a grant of 10,000 acres (40 km^{2}) by William Penn to Joseph Pike from County Cork, Ireland, in 1705. It was eventually sold by Pike's descendants and in 1838 was split in two parts, East Pikeland and West Pikeland.

East Pikeland was directly involved in the Revolutionary War, especially during the Philadelphia campaign of 1777 and 1778. It was a source of provisions for the Continental Army from its farms, mills and cottage industries. Military importance came in 1775 with the authorization by the Committee of Safety in Philadelphia to form the Continental Powder Works at French Creek. This gunpowder manufacturing complex was a key element in a system of munitions supply that involved the Warwick and Reading iron furnaces near the headwaters of French Creek, which together with other furnaces such as Hopewell produced cannon and ammunition for Washington. The prime location of the mill on the creek with its long millrace was not forgotten after the war. Some of the mill buildings were reconstructed and over the next 150 years, continued to operate variously as oil, saw, grist and spoke mills.

Mr. E. Kimber established the French Creek Boarding School for Girls in the 1830s and gave his name to the Village of Kimberton. East Pikeland today retains over 150 historically significant structures and sites. Those located in the historic Kimberton Village are the Kimberton Inn, the girls' school, Chrisman's Mill (now the Kimberton Post Office), the Kimberton Train Station and Pennypackers Mill. The Zion Lutheran Church on Route 724 holds the distinction of being the second oldest Lutheran Church in the United States, Rapps Bridge, and the Silver Bridge iron bridge on Hares Hill Road both have historic significance.

East Pikeland Township has seen considerable change since the early part of the 20th century. The area around Kimberton saw expanded housing areas, as did the corridors near Routes 23 & 724. Only the main roads were paved, according to a 1938 map. The reason for the growth in the township over the years has been an influx of population that has found East Pikeland Township an attractive and practical place to live. The suburbanization of the township, as most areas, occurred as the availability of automobiles made the general population mobile.

In 1940, the township population was 976. Space to house the ever-increasing population came from the conversion of lands that had traditionally been dairy or wheat farms. Although some farms remain today, the predominant land use pattern in the central portion of the township is residential. The spread of suburban development has occurred primarily in the French Creek valley, along Cold Stream Road.

Since World War II, the township has developed townhouse complexes, shopping centers, and industrial sites, including the Cromby Power Station (PECO) and shopping centers along Routes 23 & 724. The closing of the remaining one and two room school houses occurred in the 1950s, in favor of the regional school system.

East Pikeland Township is a township of the second class operating under the Pennsylvania Second Class Township Code. The Board of Supervisors is the governing body, with three members elected at large by the voters for staggered six-year terms. They are responsible for both the legislative and executive functions of the township. The township manager is appointed by the board and is responsible for the day-to-day business activities of the township. The manager coordinates the work of all operating departments and is directly responsible to the Board of Supervisors.

The Continental Powder Works at French Creek, Hare's Hill Road Bridge, George Hartman House, Kimberton Village Historic District, Prizer's Mill Complex, and Rapps Bridge are listed on the National Register of Historic Places.

== Geography ==
According to the United States Census Bureau, the township has a total area of 8.9 square miles (23 km^{2}), of which 8.8 square miles (23 km^{2}) is land and 0.1 square miles (0.26 km^{2}) (1.23%) is water.

== Transportation ==
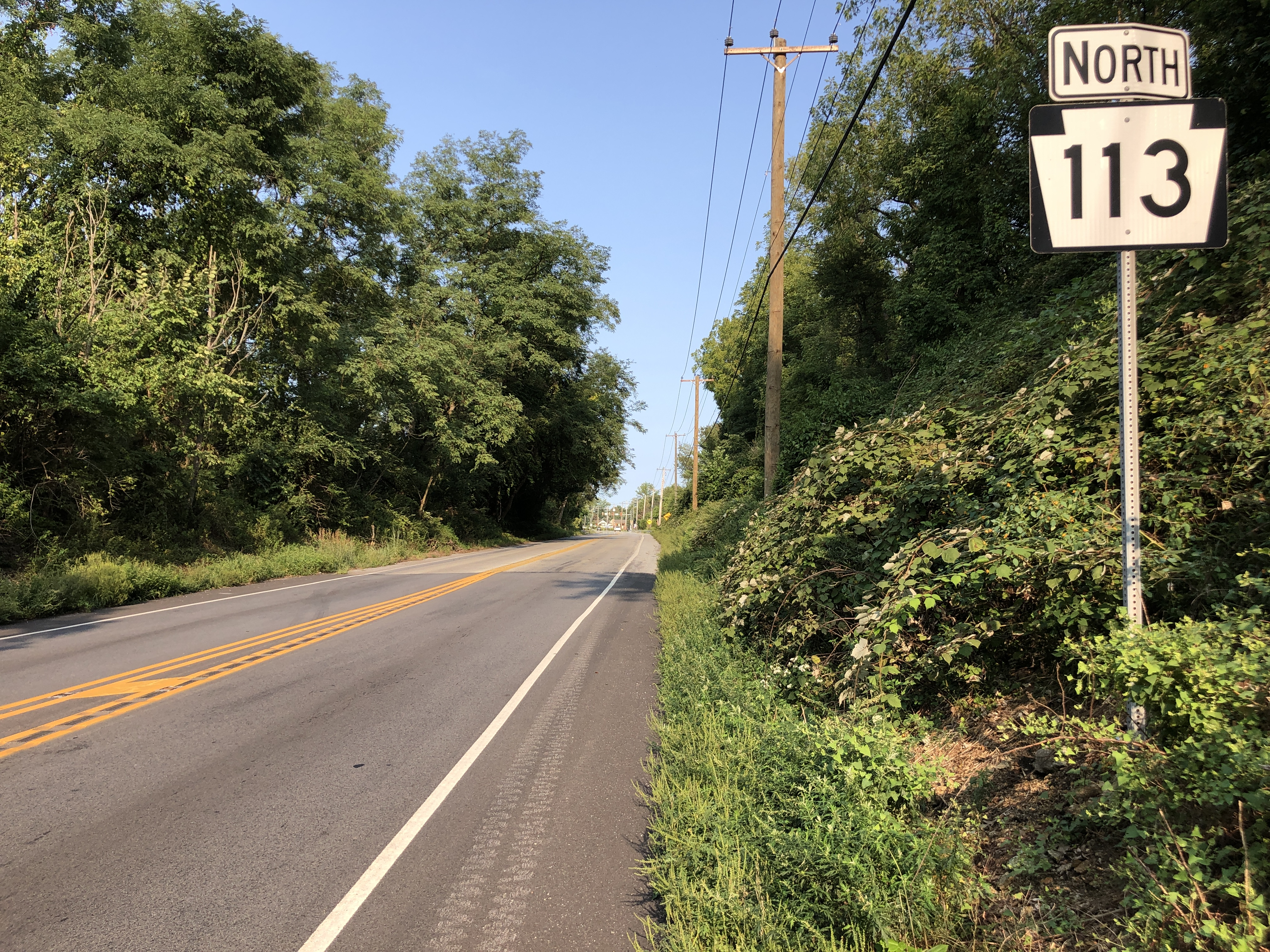
PA Route 113 northbound in East Pikeland Township

As of 2019, there were 52.46 miles (84.43 km) of public roads in East Pikeland Township, of which 13.32 miles (21.44 km) were maintained by the Pennsylvania Department of Transportation (PennDOT) and 39.14 miles (62.99 km) were maintained by the township.

Pennsylvania Route 23, Pennsylvania Route 113 and Pennsylvania Route 724 are the numbered highways serving East Pikeland Township. PA 23 follows Schuylkill Road and Ridge Road along a northwest–southeast alignment through the northeastern portion of the township. PA 113 follows Kimberton Road and Pike Springs Road along a southwest–northeast alignment through southwestern and central portions of the township. PA 724 begins at PA 23 and heads northwest along Schuylkill Road through the northeastern portion of the township.

== Demographics ==
Historical population
| Census | Pop. | Note | %± |
|---|---|---|---|
| 1930 | 928 | | — |
| 1940 | 976 | | 5.2% |
| 1950 | 1,395 | | 42.9% |
| 1960 | 2,817 | | 101.9% |
| 1970 | 4,384 | | 55.6% |
| 1980 | 4,410 | | 0.6% |
| 1990 | 5,825 | | 32.1% |
| 2000 | 6,551 | | 12.5% |
| 2010 | 7,079 | | 8.1% |
| 2020 | 8,260 | | 16.7% |
U.S. Decennial Census

At the 2010 census, the township was 93.8% non-Hispanic White, 1.9% Black or African American, 0.1% Native American, 1.9% Asian, and 0.9% were two or more races. 1.6% of the population were of Hispanic or Latino ancestry .

As of the census of 2000, there were 6,551 people, 2,530 households, and 1,834 families residing in the township. The population density was 745.1 inhabitants per square mile (287.7/km^{2}). There were 2,604 housing units at an average density of 296.2 per square mile (114.4/km^{2}). The racial makeup of the township was 96.26% White, 1.36% African American, 0.08% Native American, 1.72% Asian, 0.03% Pacific Islander, 0.15% from other races, and 0.40% from two or more races. Hispanic or Latino of any race were 0.69% of the population.

There were 2,530 households, out of which 33.6% had children under the age of 18 living with them, 63.8% were married couples living together, 5.7% had a female householder with no husband present, and 27.5% were non-families. 23.6% of all households were made up of individuals, and 7.6% had someone living alone who was 65 years of age or older. The average household size was 2.58 and the average family size was 3.07.

In the township, the population was spread out, with 25.8% under the age of 18, 4.2% from 18 to 24, 31.5% from 25 to 44, 26.0% from 45 to 64, and 12.4% who were 65 years of age or older. The median age was 39 years. For every 100 females, there were 93.6 males. For every 100 females age 18 and over, there were 90.8 males.

The median income for a household in the township was $72,850, and the median income for a family was $86,343. Males had a median income of $53,017 versus $40,500 for females. The per capita income for the township was $31,774. About 0.5% of families and 1.8% of the population were below the poverty line, including 1.0% of those under age 18 and 1.2% of those age 65 or over.

== Education ==
Phoenixville Area School District operates public schools in the township. Students in grades nine through 12 attend Phoenixville Area High School in Phoenixville.
