= John Paul Verree =

American politician

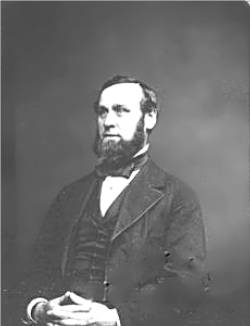
John Paul Verree

John Paul Verree (March 9, 1817 – June 27, 1889) was a Republican member of the U.S. House of Representatives from Pennsylvania.

John Paul Verree was born at "Verree Mills," on Pennypack Creek, near what is now Fox Chase Station, Philadelphia. He engaged in the manufacture of iron and subsequently was a dealer in edged tools and also in iron and steel. He was a member of the select council of Philadelphia from 1851 to 1857, serving as president from 1853 to 1857.

Verree was elected as a Republican to the Thirty-sixth and Thirty-seventh Congresses. He declined to be a candidate for renomination in 1862. He resumed his former manufacturing pursuits, and was also interested in life insurance and served as president of a company. He founded Bringhurst & Verree Tool Company in 1866 and Verree Iron & Bridge Company. He was the president of the Philadelphia Union League in 1875 and 1876. He retired from active business pursuits, and died at "Verree Mills" in Philadelphia in 1889. Interment in Cedar Hill Cemetery in Frankford, Philadelphia.

== See also ==
- Thomas William Moseley

U.S. House of Representatives
Preceded by James Landy	Member of the U.S. House of Representatives from Pennsylvania's 3rd congressional district 1859–1863	Succeeded by Leonard Myers
