= Vincent Forge Mansion =

Historic house in Pennsylvania, United States

- U.S. National Register of Historic Places
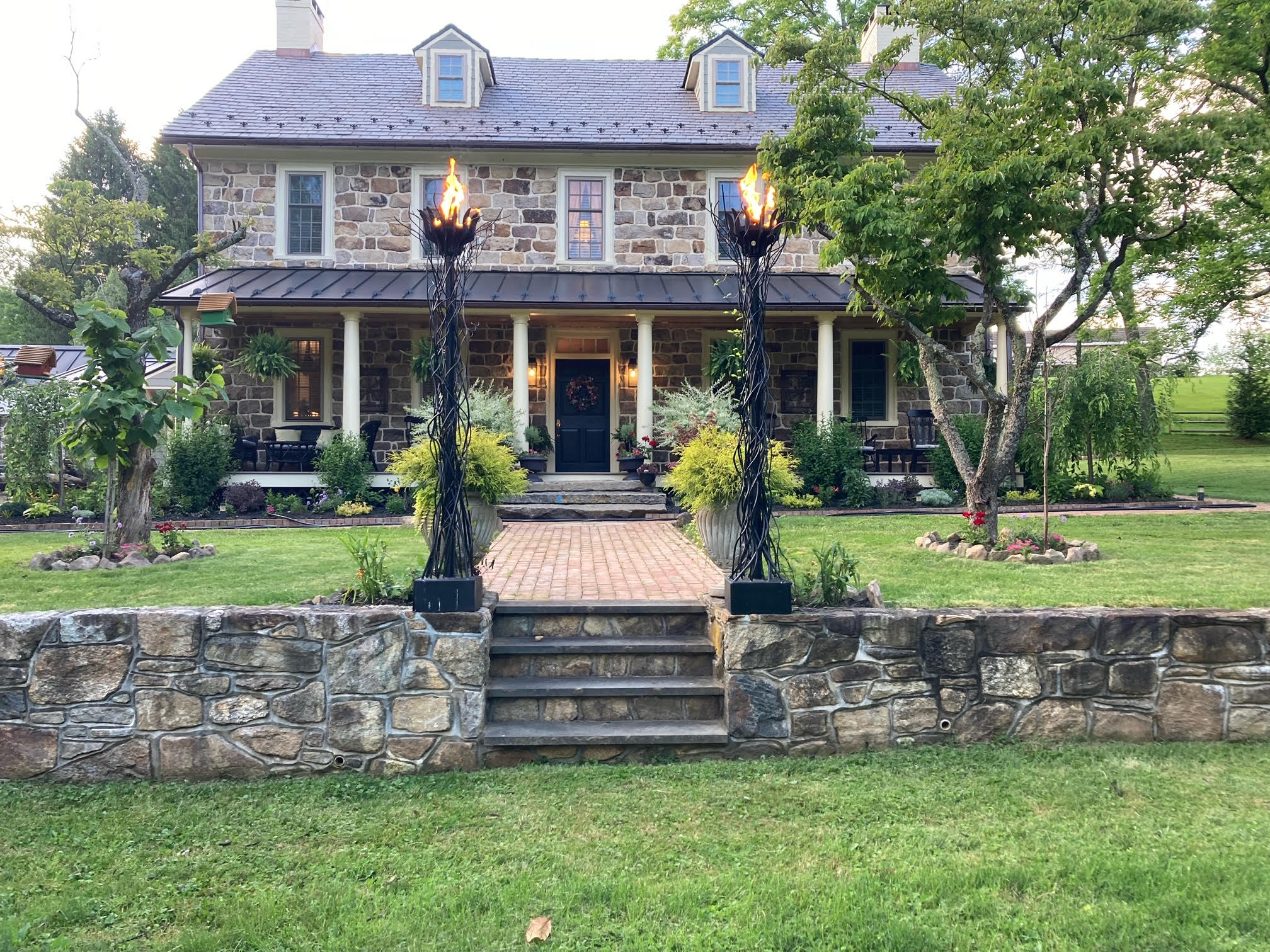
- Vincent Forge Mansion, May 2024

- Location within Pennsylvania Location within the United States
- Location: Cook's Glen Road R.D., East Vincent Township, Pennsylvania
- Coordinates: 40°09′26″N 75°38′29″W
- Area: 9.5 acres (3.8 ha)
- Built: c. 1770
- Built by: Young, John
- Architectural style: Georgian
- NRHP reference No.: 85001003
- Added to NRHP: May 9, 1985

The Vincent Forge Mansion, also known as Young's Forge Mansion and the Kerry Dell Farm, is a historic American home that is located in East Vincent Township, Chester County, Pennsylvania.

The house was added to the National Register of Historic Places in 1985.

== History and architectural features ==
Built circa 1770, this historic structure is a 2 1/2-story, five-bay by two-bay, stone dwelling with a gable roof and pent. It was originally the ironmaster's home and office at an eighteenth-century iron forge. The forgemaster, John Young, and his wife, Susanna, lived there with their five children: John, Elizabeth, Susanna, Sarah and George. The forge operated from roughly 1760 to 1800. The house later became a farmhouse.

In 1925, the property was sold to the Catholic Church for use as a boy's summer camp. The camp closed during the late-1970s.

== Gallery ==
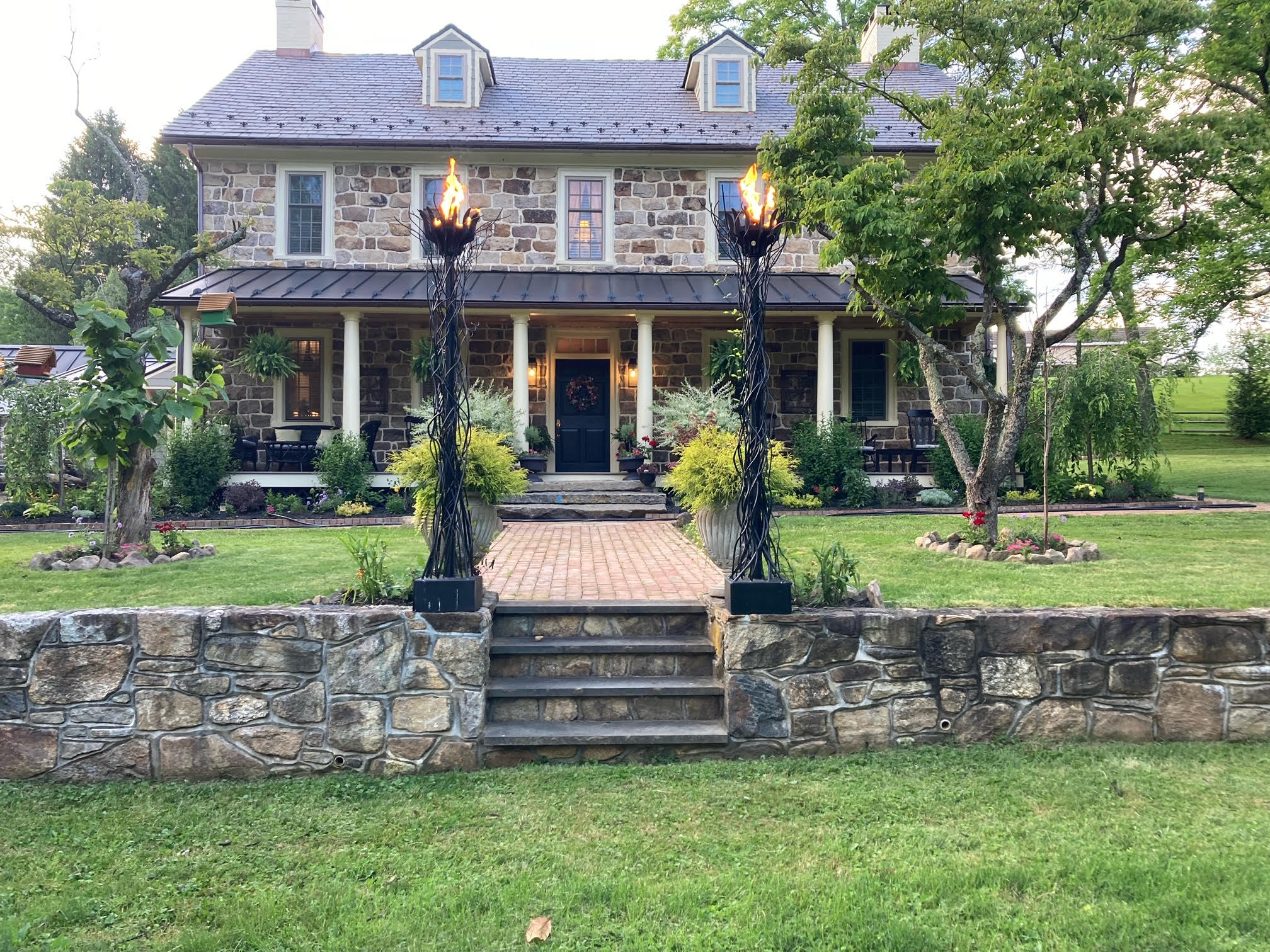
Vincent Forge Mansion, May 2024.

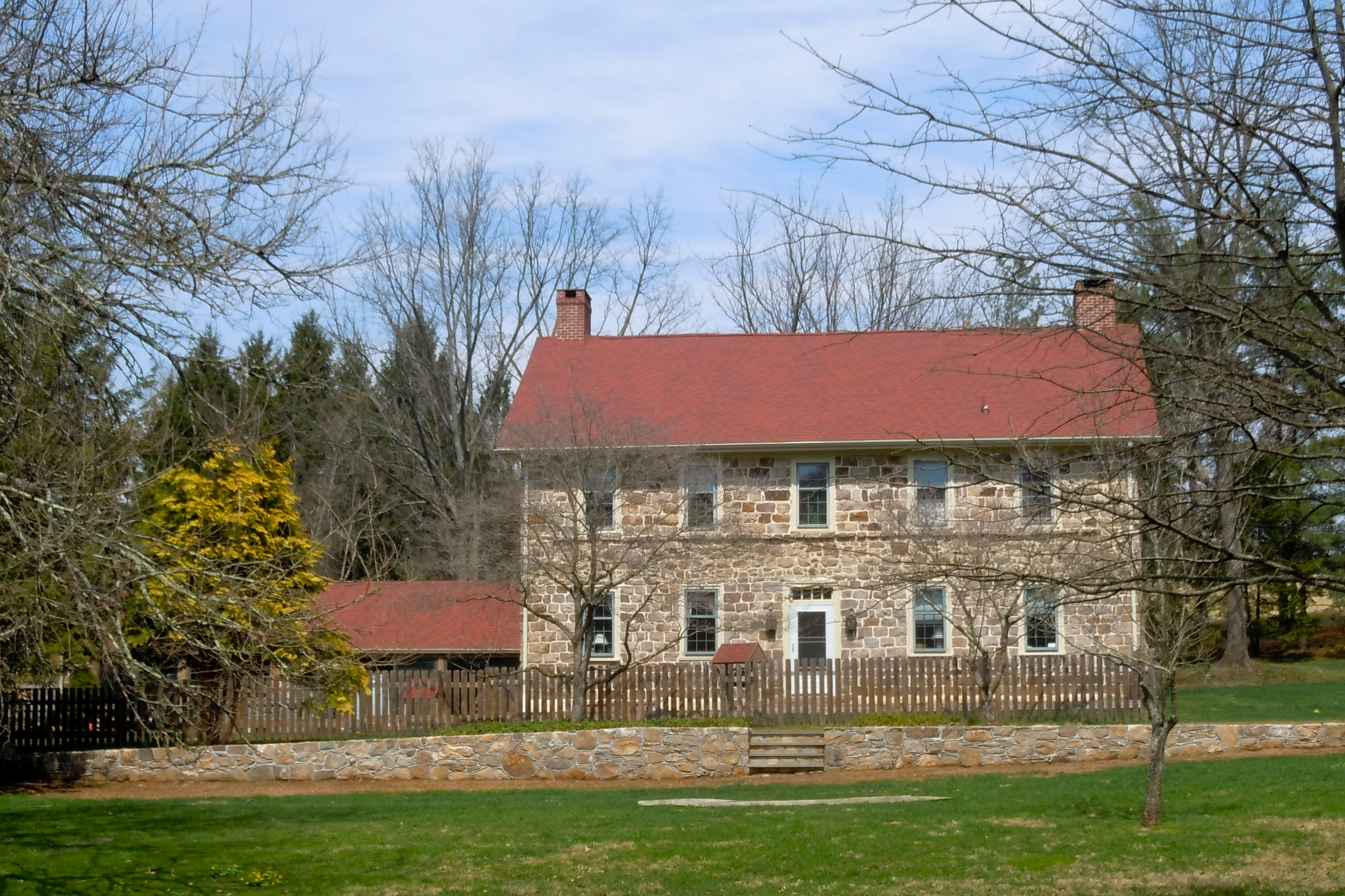
Vincent Forge Mansion, April 2011.
