= Parker's Ford =

- U.S. National Register of Historic Places
- U.S. Historic district
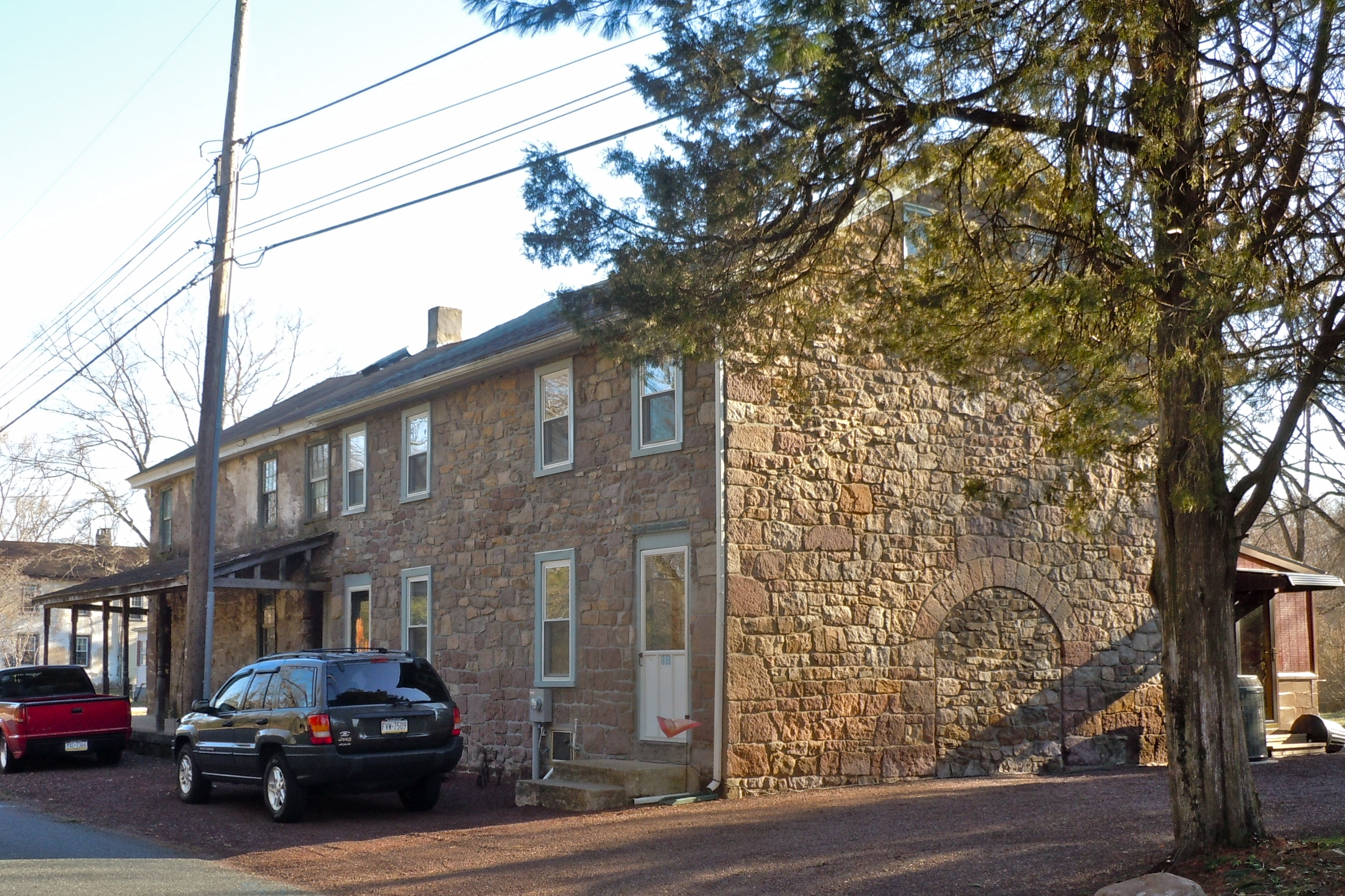
- Stone buildings at Parker's Ford, March 2011

- Location within Pennsylvania Location within the United States
- Location: Old Schuylkill Rd. near Parkerford, East Vincent Township, Pennsylvania
- Coordinates: 40°11′56″N 75°34′52″W
- Area: 7.5 acres (3.0 ha)
- Built: 1766
- NRHP reference No.: 83002226
- Added to NRHP: March 17, 1983

Parker's Ford, also known as Old Parkerford, is a national historic district located in East Vincent Township, Chester County, Pennsylvania. The district includes 5 contributing buildings, 3 contributing site, and 1 contributing structure. The buildings are a tavern (1766), stable building, and three houses. It was the site of a grist mill and sawmill by 1720.

It was added to the National Register of Historic Places in 1983.
