= East Vincent Township, Pennsylvania =

Township in Pennsylvania, US

East Vincent Township
- Township
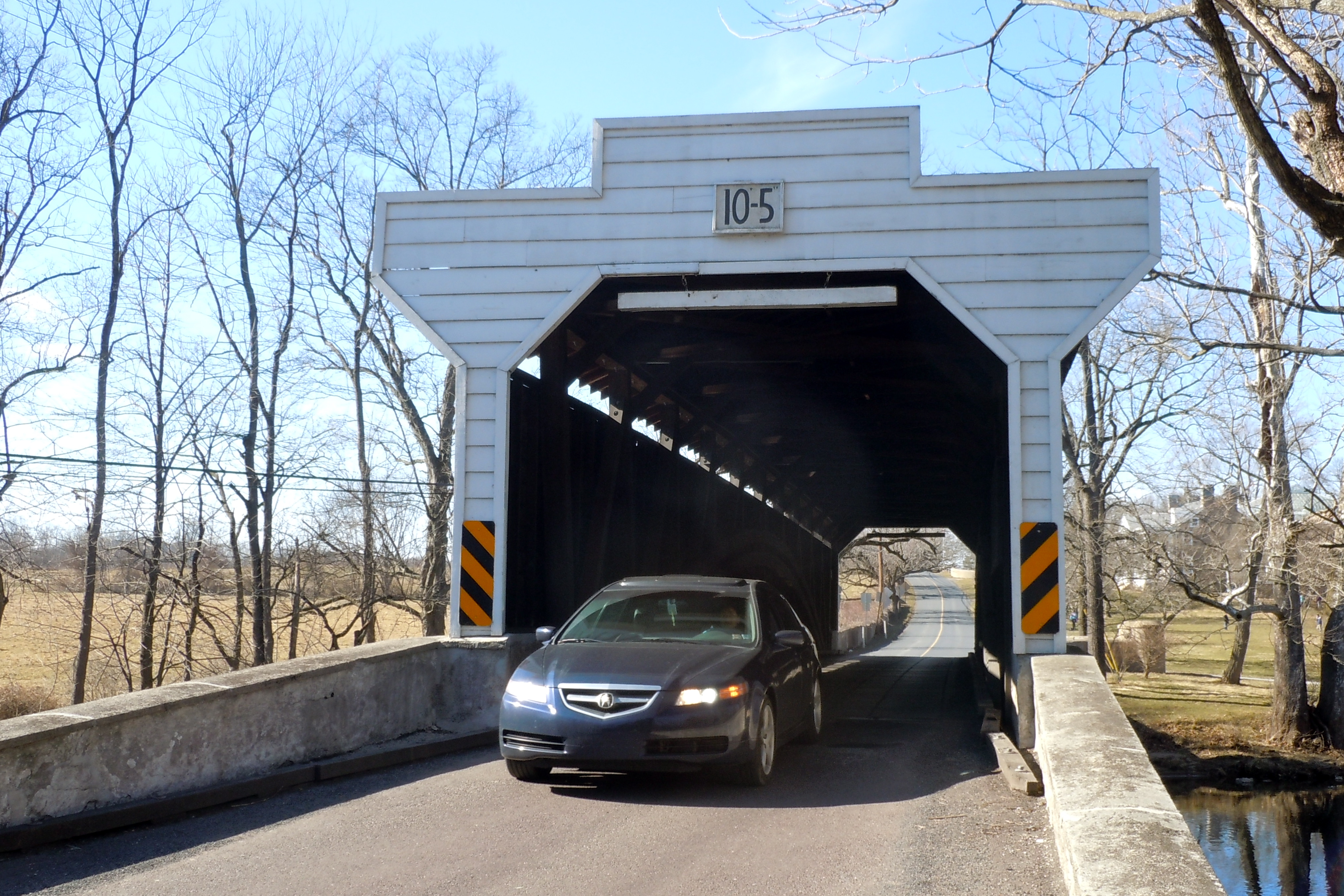
- Kennedy Covered Bridge

- Seal

- Location of East Vincent Township in Chester County, Pennsylvania (top) and of Chester County in Pennsylvania (below)

- Location of Pennsylvania in the United States
- Coordinates: 40°10′26″N 75°37′59″W
- Country: United States
- State: Pennsylvania
- County: Chester

Area
  - Total: 13.65 sq mi (35.35 km^{2})
  - Land: 13.40 sq mi (34.70 km^{2})
  - Water: 0.25 sq mi (0.65 km^{2})
- Elevation: 390 ft (120 m)

Population (2010)
  - Total: 6,821
  - Estimate (2016): 7,031
  - Density: 524.8/sq mi (202.61/km^{2})
- Time zone: UTC-5 (EST)
  - Summer (DST): UTC-4 (EDT)
- Area code: 610
- FIPS code: 42-029-22000
- Website: www.eastvincent.org

East Vincent Township is a township in Chester County, Pennsylvania, United States. The population was 6,821 at the 2010 census.

== Geography ==
According to the U.S. Census Bureau, the township has a total area of 13.7 square miles (35 km^{2}), 13.5 square miles (35 km^{2}) of which is land and 0.2 square miles (0.52 km^{2}) (1.10%) of which is water. The township is partially located in the Hopewell Big Woods.

== History ==
In 1686, Dr. Daniel Coxe received a land patent from William Penn. Major Robert Thompson and he owned what is now East and West Vincent. In 1733, the German Reformed Congregation of Vincent Township was formed. Two years later, in 1735, the Vincent Mennonite Meeting was formed. In that same year, Garrett Brumbaugh established a tavern on Ridge Road.

In 1737, Nicholas Kaiser opened a grist mill near the mouth of Pigeon Creek, which was the beginning of the township's formation. However, nine years later in 1746, all lands in Vincent were leased and were not available for sale, because of a land dispute. There were 46 renters.

In 1754, another tavern opened along Ridge Road, courtesy of Michael Cyfer. Today, the tavern is the reportedly haunted restaurant Seven Stars Inn. Four years later, the German Reformation Congregation constructed a log church, which was dedicated May 27. John Phillips Leydich served as the first pastor of the facility. Today, the ground is site to the East Vincent United Church of Christ.

Around 1760, John Young built a house on Cooks Glen Road, which still stands today, and is known for being one of the oldest houses in the area. The 1760s brought about a boom of development to the area, with Peter Stager and Edward Parker opening up establishments. The former built the Benjamin Custard Inn on Schuylkill Road. Today, it is the White Hall Inn. The latter's was a tavern near a ford on the Schuylkill River. They both opened in 1768. During the Revolutionary War, George Washington and his troops forded the Schuylkill River behind the Parker Tavern. Between 1786 and 1790, a 100-year-long dispute was settled in the courts, allowing property to finally be sold. By this time, 90 renters and a total population of 430 existed. In 1800, Frederick Sheeder moved to East Vincent. A year later, Henry Parker built a house opposite the tavern that bore his name.

In 1821, a tragedy struck East Vincent when the German Reformed Church split because of temperance caused by revival meetings. Just that year, John C. Guldin had become the fifth pastor of the church. Between 1823 and 1824, the township gained morale, as the Schuylkill Navigation Company built dams, lakes, and canals to carry water between Pottsville and Philadelphia, decreasing hardship in Vincent.

In 1831, a wall was built along the Revolutionary War Soldiers' Cemetery by the Union Battalion of Volunteers of Chester County, dedicated to the brave men who gave their lives to help shape the nation.

In 1832, joyfulness became clear as the battle was won: East and West Vincent were divided along the French Creek. The Kennedy Bridge, Parker's Ford, and Vincent Forge Mansion are listed on the National Register of Historic Places.

== Demographics ==
Historical population
Census	Pop.	Note	%±
1930	2,664		—
1940	3,614		35.7%
1950	4,576		26.6%
1960	5,453		19.2%
1970	5,084		−6.8%
1980	4,739		−6.8%
1990	4,161		−12.2%
2000	5,493		32.0%
2010	6,821		24.2%
2020	7,433		9.0%

At the 2010 census, the township was 89.3% non-Hispanic White, 4.9% Black or African American, 0.2% Native American, 2.2% Asian, 0.1% Native Hawaiian or other Pacific Islander, and 1.5% were two or more races. 2.1% of the population were of Hispanic or Latino ancestry.

As of the census of 2000, there were 5,493 people, 1,888 households, and 1,466 families residing in the township. The population density was 405.9 inhabitants per square mile (156.7/km^{2}). There were 1,960 housing units at an average density of 144.8 per square mile (55.9/km^{2}). The racial makeup of the township was 92.59% White, 4.72% African American, 0.09% Native American, 0.93% Asian, 0.04% Pacific Islander, 0.40% from other races, and 1.24% from two or more races. Hispanic or Latino of any race were 1.11% of the population.

There were 1,888 households, out of which 42.3% had children under the age of 18 living with them, 63.9% were married couples living together, 10.5% had a female householder with no husband present, and 22.3% were non-families. 19.3% of all households were made up of individuals, and 9.3% had someone living alone who was 65 years of age or older. The average household size was 2.75 and the average family size was 3.16.

In the township the population was spread out, with 28.8% under the age of 18, 4.9% from 18 to 24, 29.2% from 25 to 44, 22.7% from 45 to 64, and 14.5% who were 65 years of age or older. The median age was 38 years. For every 100 females there were 105.0 males. For every 100 females age 18 and over, there were 102.9 males.

The median income for a household in the township was $63,851, and the median income for a family was $78,038. Males had a median income of $52,625 versus $33,620 for females. The per capita income for the township was $27,799. About 7.2% of families and 6.5% of the population were below the poverty line, including 8.6% of those under age 18 and 4.9% of those age 65 or over.

== Transportation ==
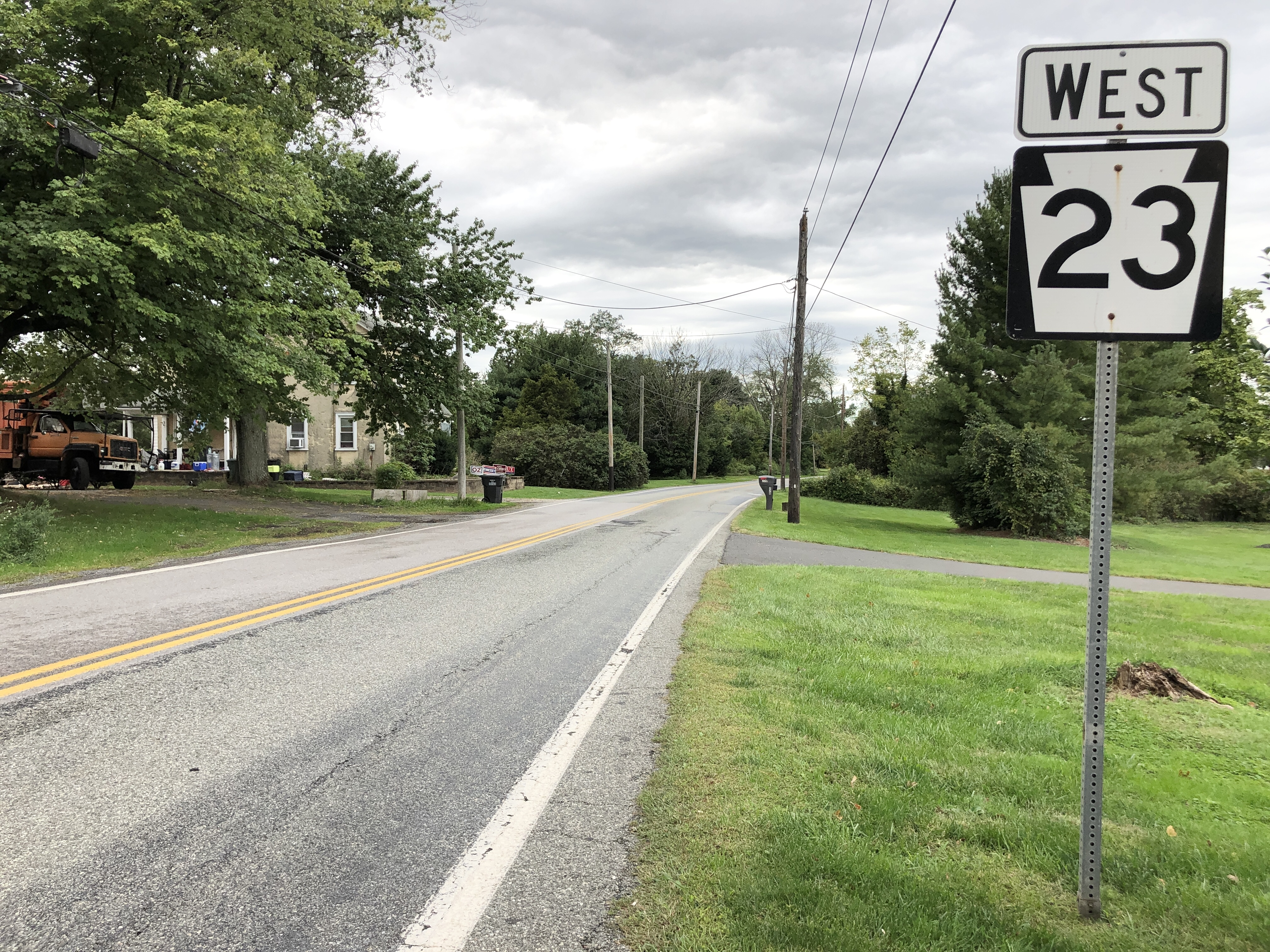
PA Route 23 eastbound in East Vincent Township

As of 2018, there were 60.00 miles (96.56 km) of public roads in East Vincent Township, of which 19.08 miles (30.71 km) were maintained by the Pennsylvania Department of Transportation (PennDOT) and 40.92 miles (65.85 km) were maintained by the township.

Pennsylvania Route 23 and Pennsylvania Route 724 are the numbered highways serving East Vincent Township. PA 23 follows Ridge Road along a northwest-southeast alignment through western and southern portions of the township, while PA 724 follows Schuylkill Road along a northwest-southeast alignment through the northeastern part of the township.

== Education ==
The township is in the Owen J. Roberts School District. Public school students in grades nine through 12 attend Owen J. Roberts High School.
