= Prizer's Mill Complex =

National historic district in East Pikeland, Chester, Pennsylvania, United States

- U.S. National Register of Historic Places
- U.S. Historic district
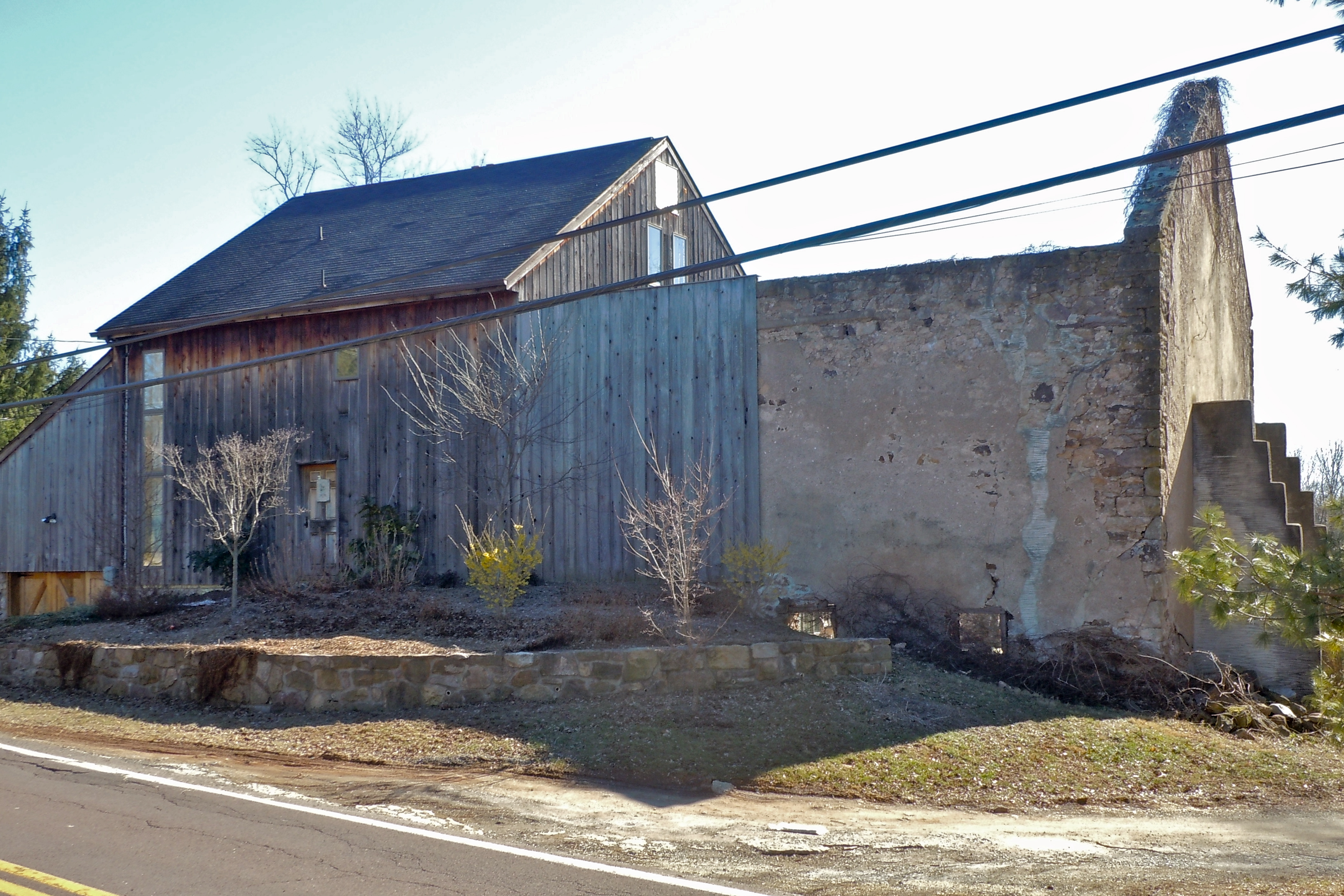
- Barn in the Prizer's Mill Complex, March 2011

- Location within Pennsylvania Location within the United States
- Location: West of Phoenixville on Seven Stars Road, East Pikeland Township, Pennsylvania
- Coordinates: 40°08′16″N 75°34′27″W
- Area: 4 acres (1.6 ha)
- Built: 1790
- NRHP reference No.: 78002376
- Added to NRHP: September 6, 1978

Prizer's Mill Complex is a national historic district located in East Pikeland Township, Chester County, Pennsylvania. The district includes 5 contributing buildings, 1 contributing site, and 2 contributing structures. They include miller's houses dated to the 18th and 19th century, two barns, a cistern, a grist mill, millrace, and the remains of a 19th-century carriage house.

It was added to the National Register of Historic Places in 1978.
