= Kimberton Village Historic District =

Historic district in Pennsylvania, United States

- U.S. National Register of Historic Places
- U.S. Historic district
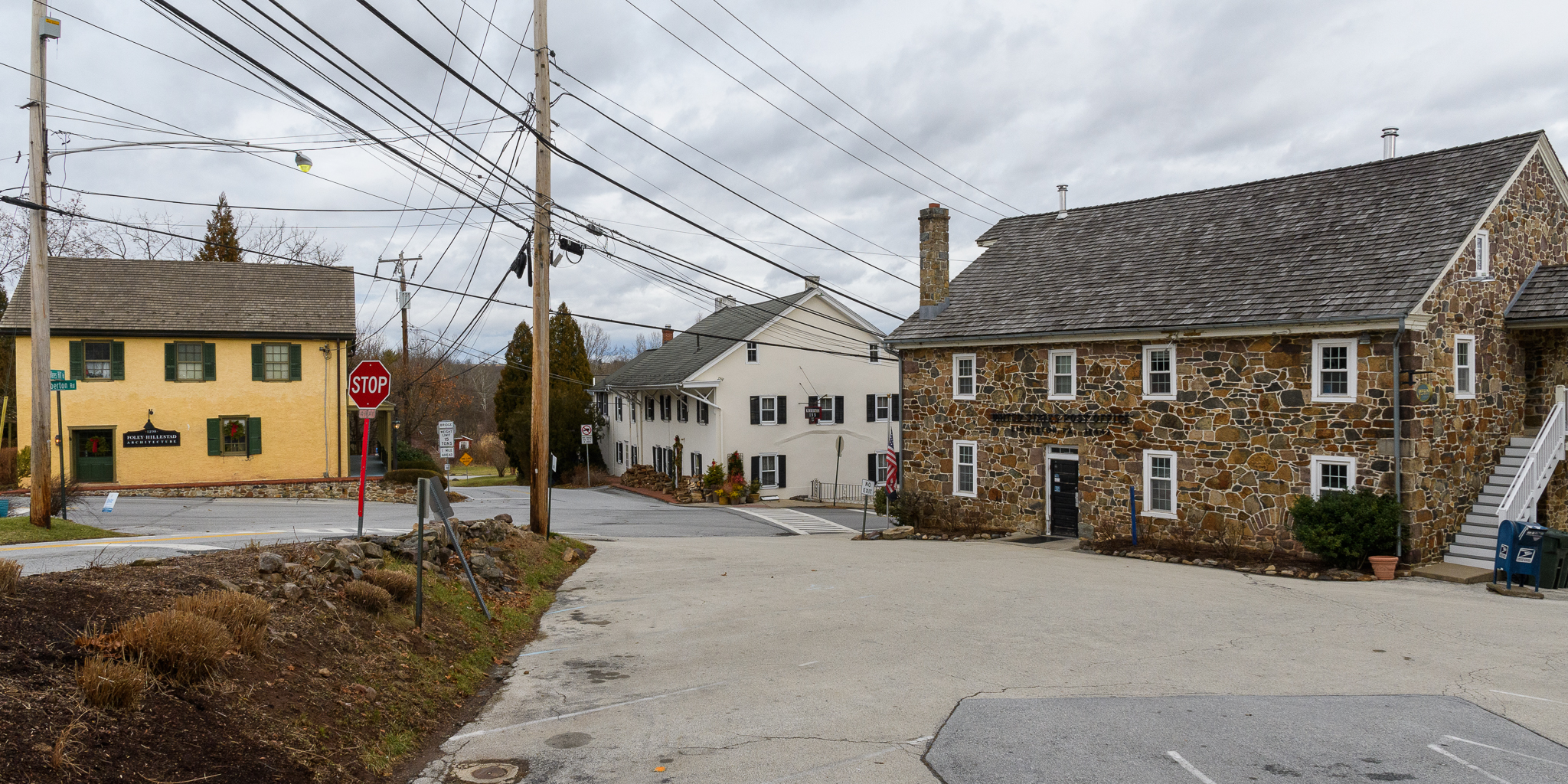
- Intersection of Hares Hill Rd & Kimberton Rd showing 3 of the original 4 structures (2025)

- Location within Pennsylvania Location within the United States
- Location: Hare's Hill, Prizer, and Kimberton Rds., East Pikeland Township, Pennsylvania
- Coordinates: 40°7′47″N 75°34′36″W
- Area: 48.3 acres (19.5 ha)
- Built: c. 1750
- NRHP reference No.: 76001626, 87001252 (Boundary Increase)
- Added to NRHP: May 6, 1976, July 30, 1987 (Boundary Increase)

The Kimberton Village Historic District is a national historic district that is located in East Pikeland Township, Chester County, Pennsylvania.

== History and architectural features ==
This district includes 62 contributing buildings and two contributing structures, which are located in the village of Kimberton Village. It was added to the National Register of Historic Places in 1976, with a boundary increase in 1987.

The three original buildings that were listed on the National Register were the "Sign of the Bear" tavern (1768), Chrisman grist mill (1796, now post office), and French Creek Boarding School (1787, 1813). A boundary increase in 1987 expanded the district to include a variety of vernacular farmhouses, barns and other outbuildings, a grange hall, a former Quaker meetinghouse, a frame milk receiving station, and railroad station. The contributing structures are a dam and stone arch bridge.

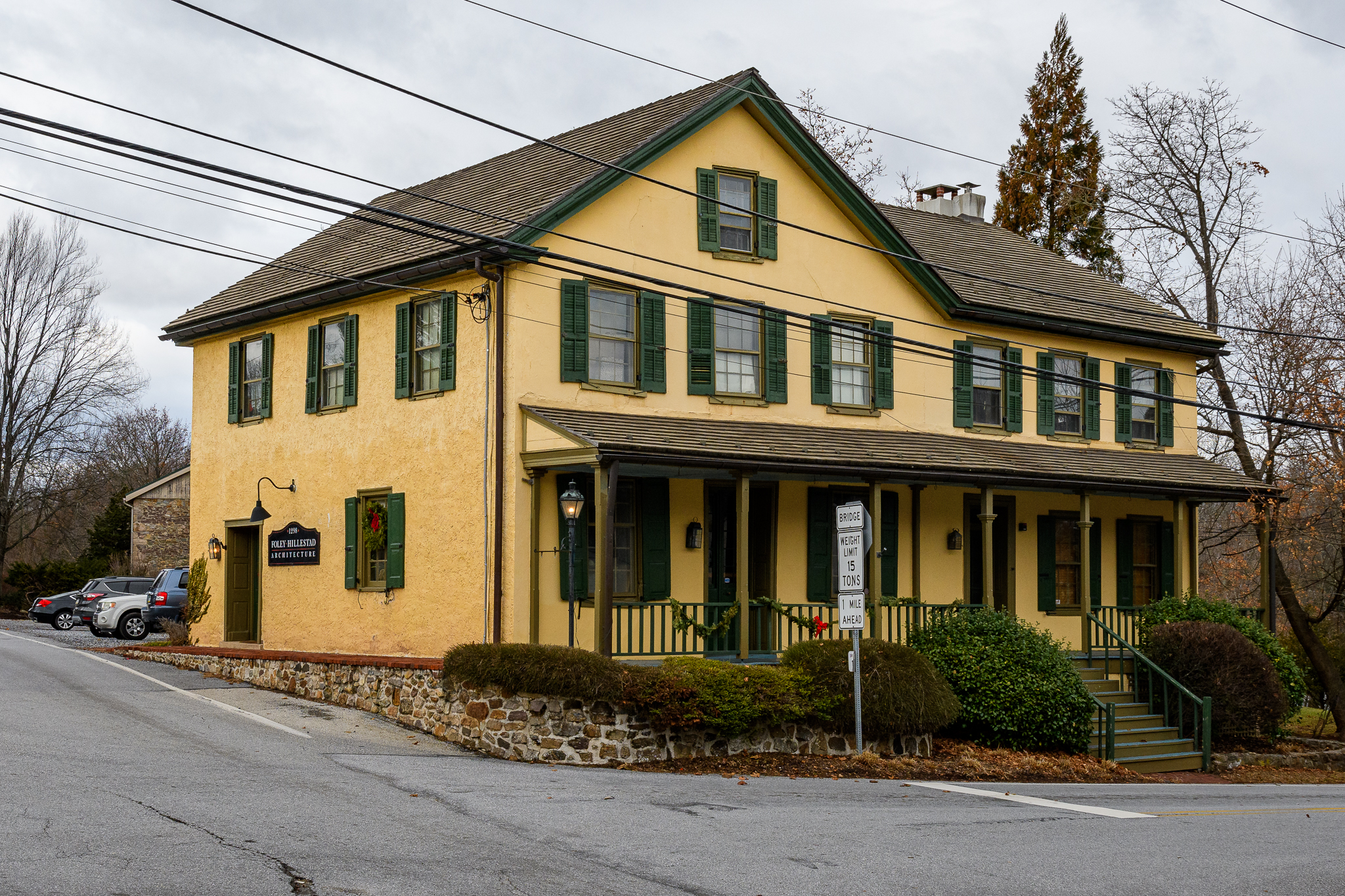
Sign of the Bear Tavern (ca. 1768). Converted to a General Store in 1820, now an architect's office

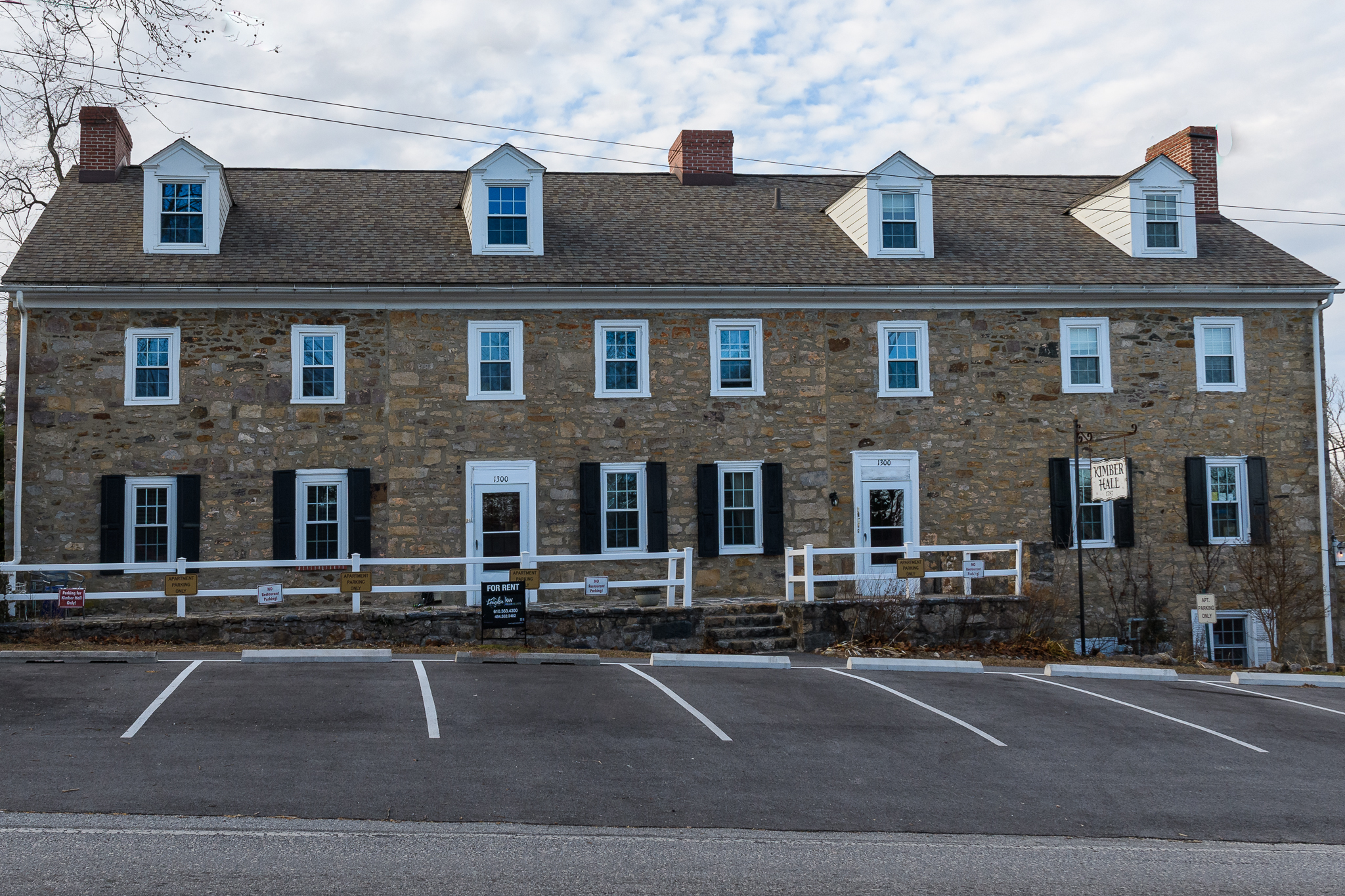
Chrisman's Farmhouse (ca. 1796), Present day Kimber Hall

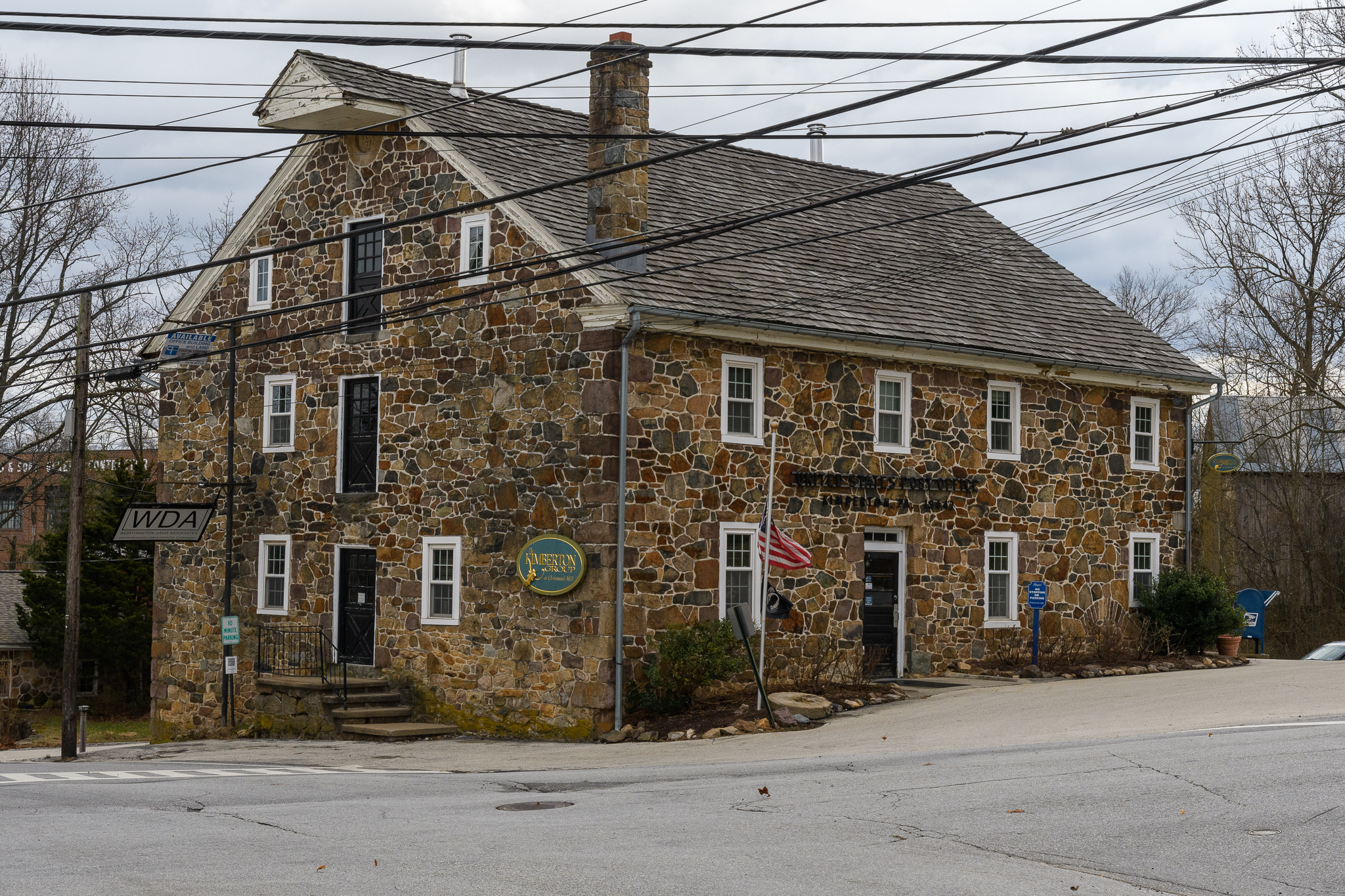
Chrisman's Mill (ca. 1796) Now the Kimberton Post Office and private businesses

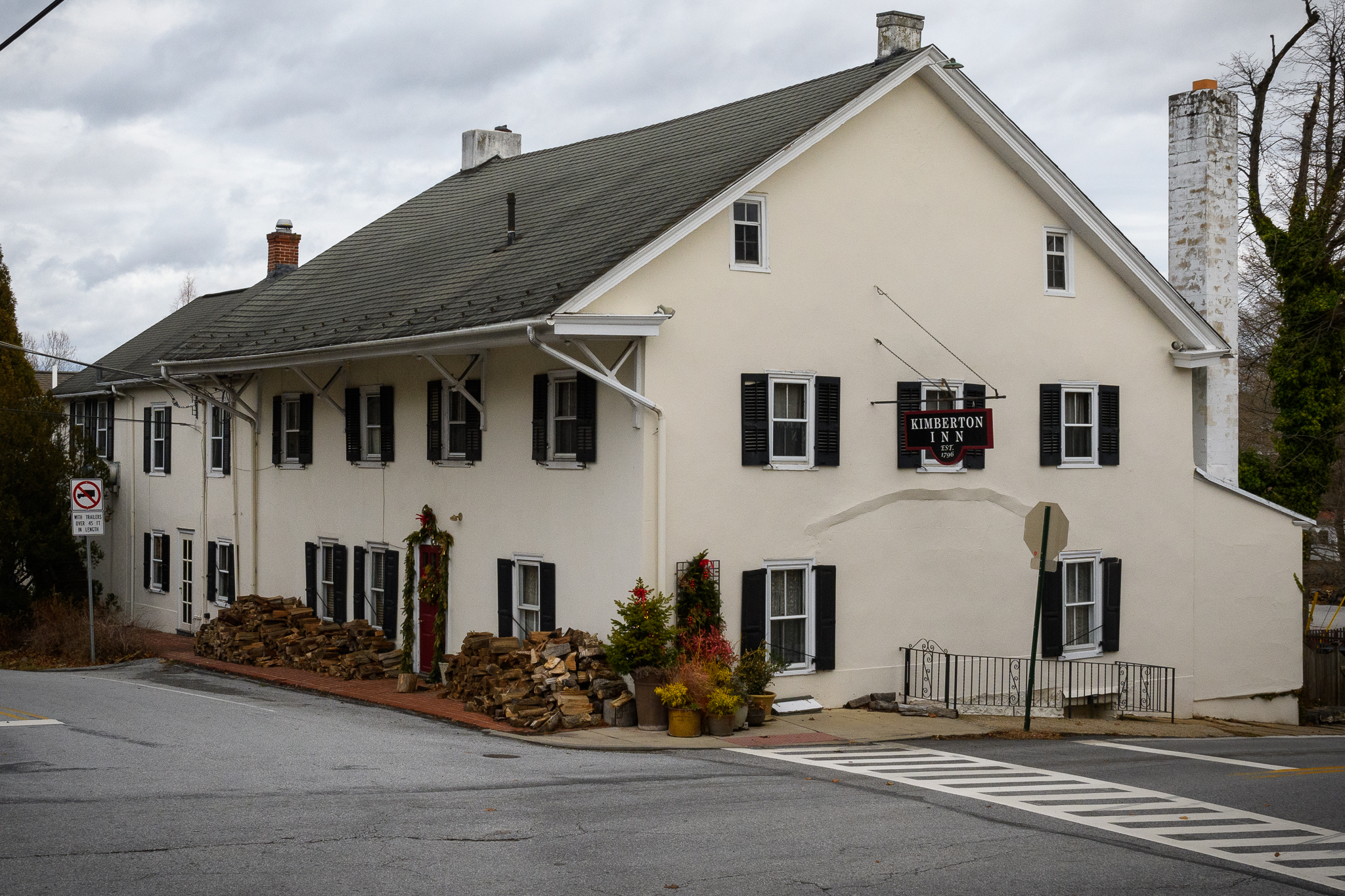
Inn built in 1820 by Emmor Kimber to house relatives of school residents
