= Half Chance Iron Bridge =

Half Chance Bridge
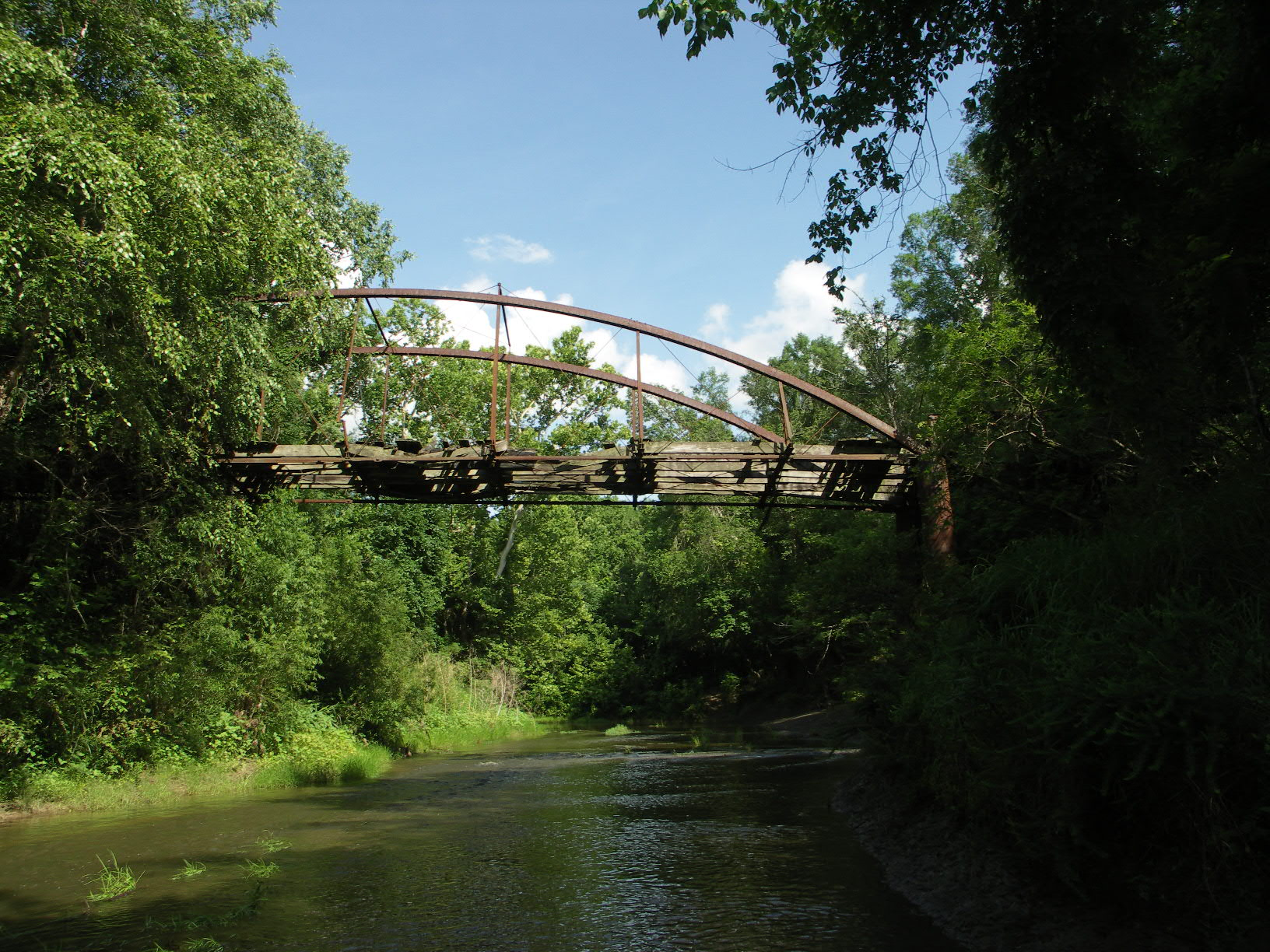
- Coordinates: 32°18′50″N 87°42′14″W
- Crosses: Chickasaw Bogue Creek
- Locale: Half Chance, Alabama
- Official name: Half Chance Iron Bridge

Characteristics
- Design: tied-arch bridge
- Material: Wrought iron
- Width: 12 feet (3.7 m)
- Longest span: 100 feet (30 m)

History
- Constructed by: King Bridge Company
- Construction end: 1880
- Half-Chance Bridge
- U.S. National Register of Historic Places
- Location within Alabama Location within the United States
- Location: Marengo County, Alabama, United States
- Nearest city: Dayton, Alabama
- Coordinates: 32°18′44″N 87°42′04″W
- Area: less than one acre
- Built: 1880
- Architect: King Iron Bridge Manufacturing Company
- NRHP reference No.: 72000166
- Added to NRHP: September 14, 1972

Location
- Interactive map of Half Chance Bridge

The Half Chance Iron Bridge, also known as the Half-Chance Bridge, was a historic single-span wrought iron bridge located near the small community of Half Chance, between the towns of Linden and Dayton in rural Marengo County, Alabama. It was on Marengo County Road 39 over Chickasaw Bogue Creek. The bridge was the oldest surviving iron bridge in Alabama, making it an important transportation and engineering landmark for the state.

County Road 39 has been moved over the years. The Half Chance Iron Bridge was approximately 1/4 mi. to the South and on private property.

Half Chance Iron Bridge was a 12-foot (3.7 m) wide tied-arch bridge with a span of 100 feet (30 m). It was built by the King Iron Bridge Manufacturing Company of Cleveland, Ohio in 1880. King Iron Bridge Manufacturing Company was founded in 1871 by Zenas King. As early as 1878 it was manufacturing many types of truss, combination, and wooden bridges and by the 1880s it was the largest highway bridge work in the United States.

The bridge was reported as destroyed in a flood between 2008 and 2012. The structure no longer exists.
