= Esther J. Trimble Lippincott =

American educator, reformer, author (1838–1888)

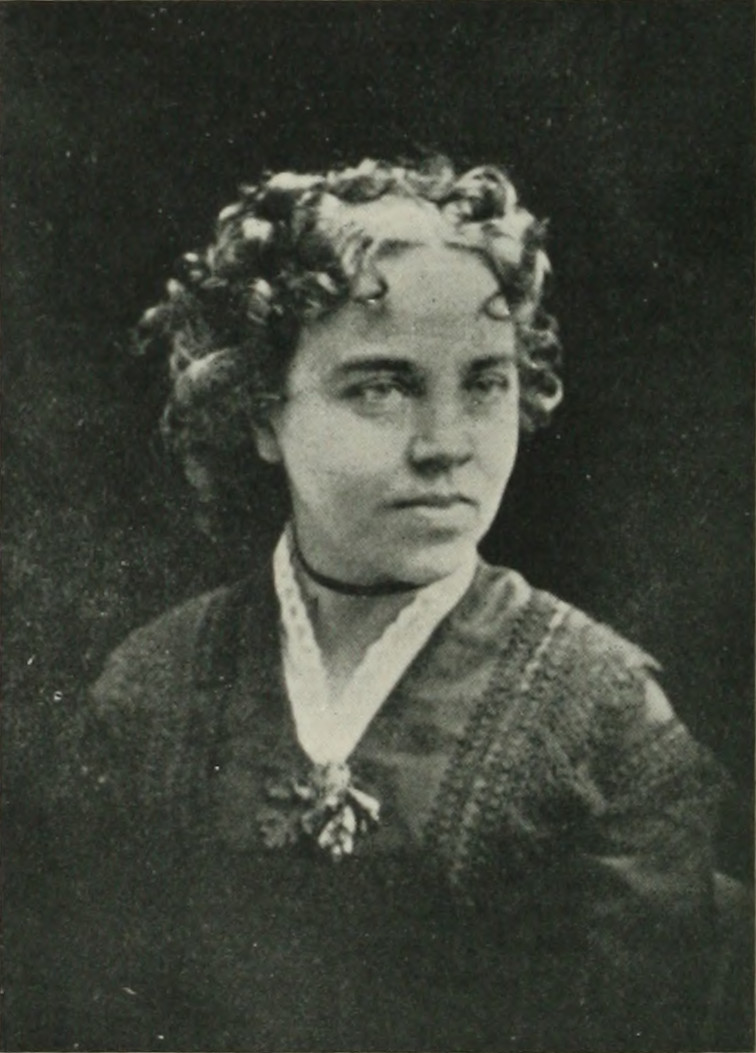
- Photo in A Woman of the Century
- Born: Esther Jane Trimble; March 2, 1838 near Kimberton, Pennsylvania, U.S.
- Died: June 2, 1888 (aged 50); Philadelphia, Pennsylvania, U.S.
- Resting place: Friends' Burial Ground, Merion Station, Pennsylvania, U.S.
- Occupations: educator; reformer; author
- Spouse: Isaac Howey Lippincott (m. 1882; died 1884)
- Relatives: Graceanna Lewis (cousin)
- Writing career
- Language: English
- Genre: non-fiction

Esther J. Trimble Lippincott (née, Trimble; March 2, 1838 – June 2, 1888) was an American educator, reformer, and non-fiction author. She served as professor of elocution and literature at Swarthmore College, and West Chester State Normal School. The Quaker naturalist, illustrator, and social reformer, Graceanna Lewis, was Lippincott's cousin.

== Early life ==
Esther Jane Trimble was born on a farm near Kimberton, Pennsylvania, March 2, 1838. (Note: According to Lucas (1893), Lippincott was born in West Vincent Township, Pennsylvania, about 1833.) She was the only daughter of Joseph Trimble and his wife, Rebecca Fussell. Her father died when she was about eighteen months of age. As she grew older, she developed a love for literature, and chose its study as her life-work.

== Career ==
Her proficiency was such that she was invited to become an instructor in that branch in Swarthmore College, Pennsylvania. Later, she became a professor of literature in the normal school of West Chester, Pennsylvania (now West Chester University). From her early adulthood, her feeling of independence led her to take pride in self-maintenance, and to care for her widowed mother. She married Isaac Howey Lippincott (1828–1884), of Woodstown, New Jersey, 1882. He died at the end of two years.

After she became a widow, she visited Europe to further her studies. As an author she was successful in the preparation of a Chart of General Literature, a Hand-Book of English and American Literature, and a Short Course of Literature. These became standard works in schools and colleges. A paper prepared by her, entitled "Law versus License," indicated her feeling on the temperance issue. She left behind manuscripts which she was anxious to publish before her death.

Lippincott was deeply interested in issues pertaining to human welfare, and believed in the cardinal duty of obedience to the Inward light, recognized by the Society of Friends, of which she was a member. In every effort to create homes for invalids, she was in special sympathy, and before her death, left a substantial amount of money for the founding of several such homes in Philadelphia. She lectured on temperance and literature (Chaucer, or The Dawn of English Literature; The Elizabethan Age; The Artificial School of Writers; Burns; Cowper; The Age of Scott and Byron; Wordsworth and his Contemporaries; The Victorian Writers; American Literature; Wits and Humorists of the 19th Century; London; My Pilgrimage to Canterbury).

== Death ==
Esther J. Trimble Lippincott died in Philadelphia on June 2, 1888. (Note: According to Willard & Livermore (1893), Lippincott died in the house of a relative in Wilmington, Delaware.) She was buried in the Friends' Burial Ground, in Merion, near her parents.

== Selected works ==
- A Chart of General Literature, from the earliest times, embracing a complete outline of English literature, with the prominent writers of other nations
- Chart of Ancient Literature, Philadelphia, J. M. Stoddart & Co., 1875
- A Hand Book of Euglish and American Literature, Philadelphia, Eldridge & Bro., 1882
- A Short Course in Literature, English and American, for the use of schools and academies. Philadelphia, Eldridge & Bro., 1883
