= George Hartman House =

Historic house in Pennsylvania, United States

- U.S. National Register of Historic Places
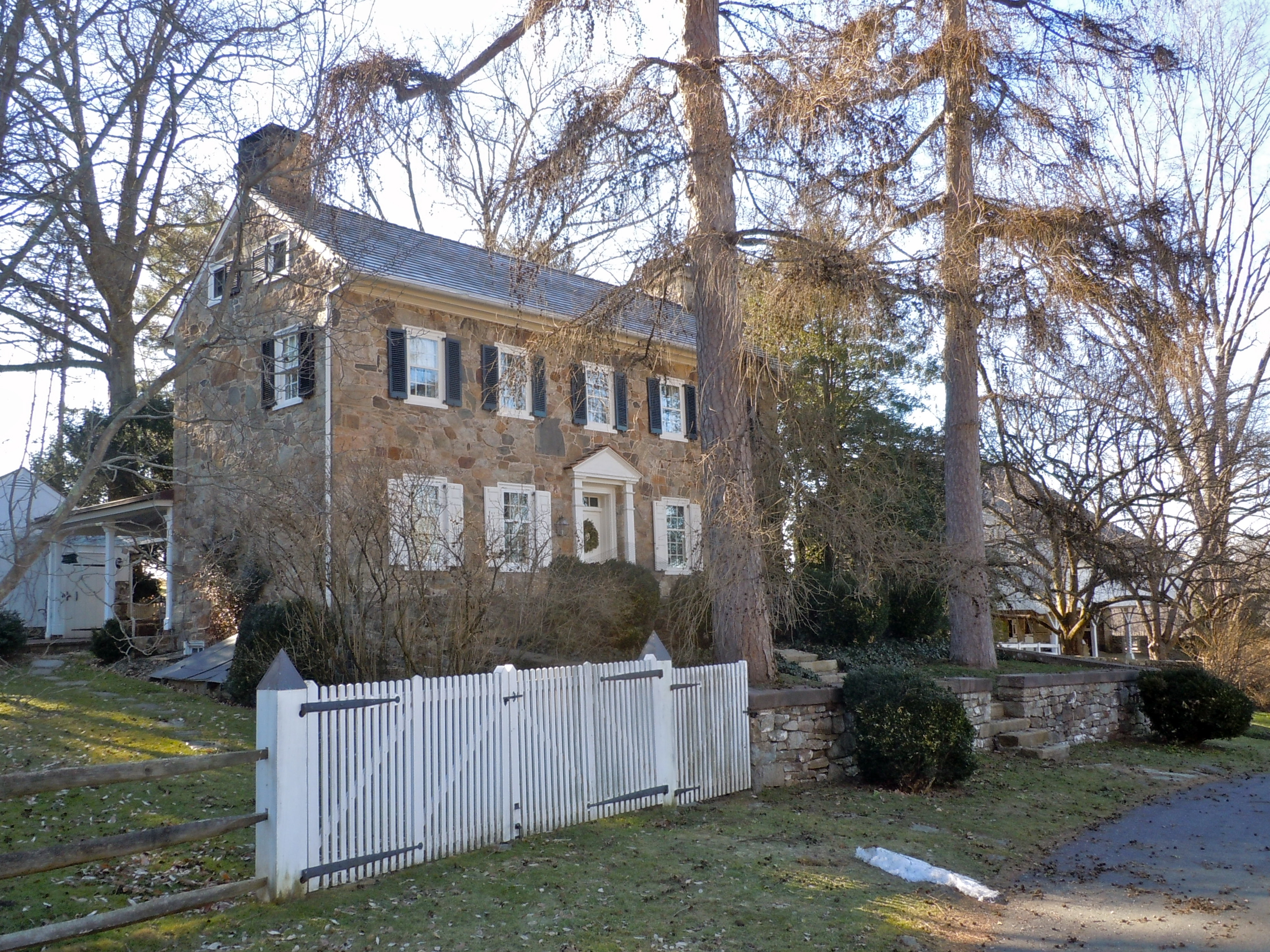
- George Hartman House, March 2011

- Location within Pennsylvania Location within the United States
- Location: West of Phoenixville on Church Road, East Pikeland Township, Pennsylvania
- Coordinates: 40°6′13″N 75°35′32″W
- Area: 0.7 acres (0.28 ha)
- Built: c. 1795, 1806
- NRHP reference No.: 76001629
- Added to NRHP: March 26, 1976

The George Hartman House, also known as Larchwood Farm, is an historic home which is located in East Pikeland Township, Chester County, Pennsylvania.

The house was added to the National Register of Historic Places in 1976.

== History and architectural features ==
The Hartman family resided on the property from roughly 1750 to 1906. It was here that the George Hartman House would ultimately be erected and then expanded.

The George Hartman House was built in three stages. The oldest section, which was built between about 1790 and 1801, is a two-and-one-half-story, random fieldstone house with a gable roof and twenty-inch-thick stone walls. The two-and-one-half-story, center hall plan random fieldstone addition was built in 1806. During the late 1930s, a two-and-one-half-story frame addition was erected on the north side.
