= Kennedy Bridge (Kimberton, Pennsylvania) =

- U.S. National Register of Historic Places
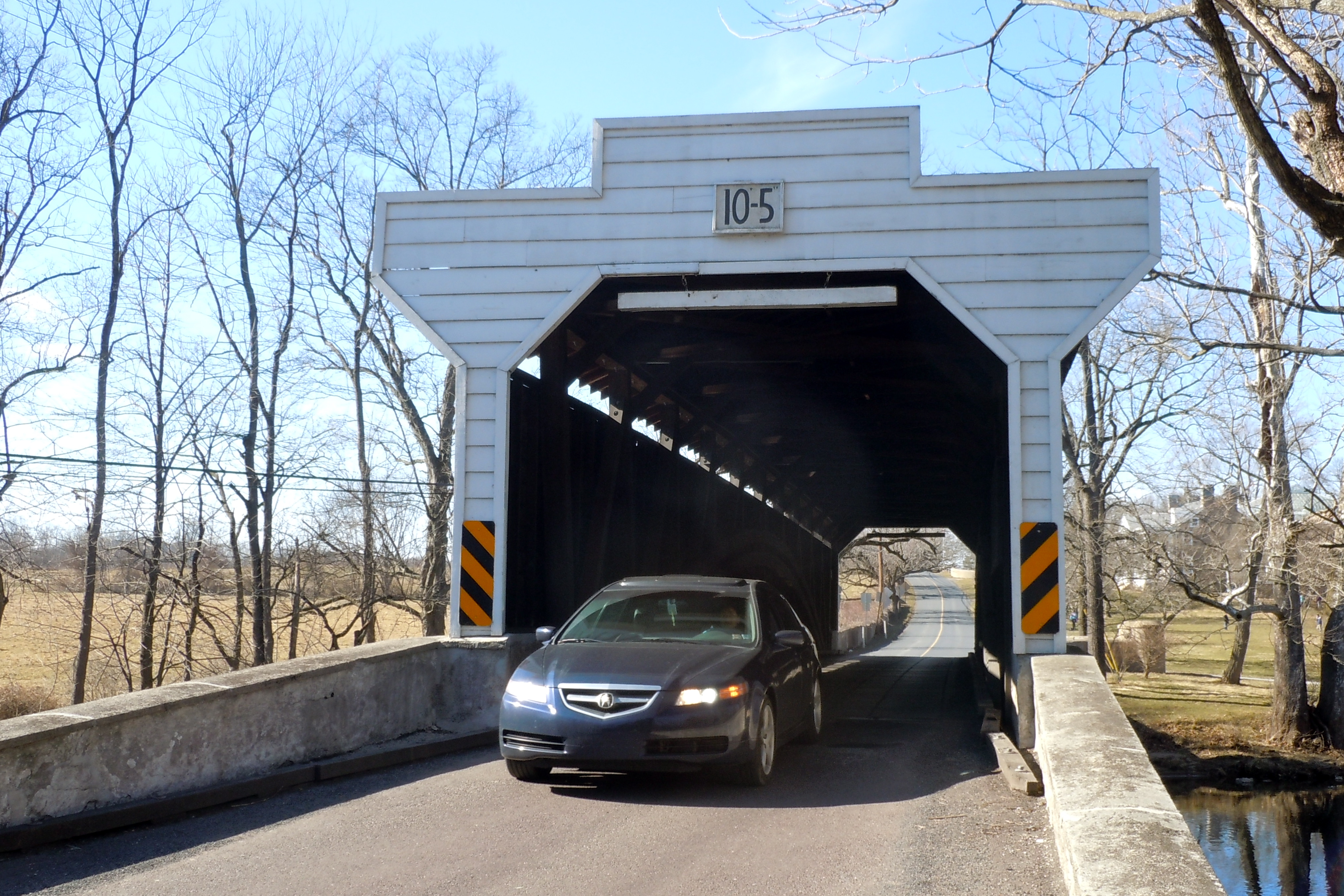

- Location within Pennsylvania Location within the United States
- Location: North of Kimberton off Pennsylvania Route 23 on Seven Stars Road over French Creek, East Vincent Township, Pennsylvania
- Coordinates: 40°8′25″N 75°34′36″W
- Area: less than one acre
- Built: 1856
- Built by: Alex Kennedy, Jesse King
- Architectural style: Burr truss
- MPS: Covered Bridges of Chester County TR (AD)
- NRHP reference No.: 74001770
- Added to NRHP: January 21, 1974

Kennedy Bridge is a historic wooden covered bridge located in East Vincent Township, Chester County, Pennsylvania. It is a 96-foot-long (29 m), Burr truss bridge, constructed in 1856. It was damaged and repaired after a flood in 1884 and reinforced in 1936. It crosses French Creek.

It was listed on the National Register of Historic Places in 1974.
