= Zenas King =

American bridge builder (1818–1892)

Zenas King (May 1, 1818 – 1892) was an American bridge builder. He started his career in 1858 and moved from Cincinnati to Cleveland, Ohio, around 1861. He established a bridge-building works on Wason Street in Cleveland in 1865. King founded the King Iron Bridge and Manufacturing Company in 1871. As early as 1878, it was manufacturing many types of truss, combination, and wooden bridges, and by the 1880s it was the largest highway bridge works in the United States. Production moved from Wason Street to larger facilities on Ruskin Avenue in 1888. The company changed its name to the King Bridge Company after his death.

== Early life ==
King was born on May 1, 1818, in Kingston, Vermont, and his father was a farmer. After his father moved to St. Lawrence County, New York, to a new farm, King lived at that farm until he was 21 years old. He moved to Milan, Ohio, to take contracts for erecting buildings. In 1848, he and C. H. Buck worked in mercantile business for eight years. With his health deteriorating, King became a traveling agent for a Cincinnati agricultural machinery house. He later became an agent for the Moseley Iron Bridge and Roof Company and started studying bridges.

== Career ==
King was an assistant of Thomas William Moseley, who patented the design of a wrought iron tubular bowstring bridge in 1857. King improved upon Moseley's efforts by emphasizing distribution and marketing across the United States. Despite not being trained as an engineer, King knew about the sale and manufacture of boiler plating for farm machinery. He used this knowledge and with the help of a metalworker named Peter Frees, the two of them sent in a patent for a way to improve the bowstring arch form. Their innovation was at first considered to not be groundbreaking enough to receive a patent, but King appealed directly to the commissioner of patents about making a few adjustments to the design which was a success. His bridge types were originally used in Ohio, later being built in almost every U.S. state. Other bridge building companies took notice of his business and entered into the bowstring bridge market; the number of these bridges expanded significantly after the Civil War. In 1864, King and Frees split up and King continued to build bridges.

In 1871, King founded King Iron Bridge and Manufacturing Company. King built a factory in Cleveland next to a main rail line, allowing the bridge pieces to be shipped and assembled quickly. He established agents across the United States who sold the bridges to officials of cities and counties. Each agent received a catalog containing illustrations of the bridges that have already been built, schematics, and plans. King sold almost 100 bridges by 1872 in Kansas, Arkansas, Nebraska, and Iowa. He later started a headquarters in Des Moines, Iowa and hired his nephew, George King, as an agent of the company. In 1884, King began to hire graduates from engineering schools, but most of them left the company after a short while. The chief engineer who served the longest was Albert H. Porter, working in 1879 and then again from 1886 to 1903. In the 1880s, King employed 360 people.

King built thousands of bridges across the continental United States, some of which are still standing.

== Death ==
King died in 1892 after a brief illness. After his death, the state of Ohio and the U.S. government filed and won a suit against the King Iron Bridge and Manufacturing Company and 13 other bridge-building companies for engaging in pooling arrangements. Sixteen bridge companies formed the pool so that the companies could control and share the profits from highway bridge projects; the antitrust suit deemed that such an arrangement was illegal. The company that King founded lost the suit and was later terminated in 1922, 16 years after the company moved to New Jersey to do business as the King Bridge Company.

After the King Bridge Company was terminated, the King family took control of the Cleveland Bridge Company and changed its name to King Bridge Company. The president of the new company was Norman C. King. This company lasted until at least the 1940s.

== See also ==
- Thomas William Moseley
- Half Chance Iron Bridge
- Moseley Wrought Iron Arch Bridge
