= Moseley Wrought Iron Arch Bridge =

Bridge in Massachusetts

Coordinates: 42°40′8.6″N 71°7′21.2″W

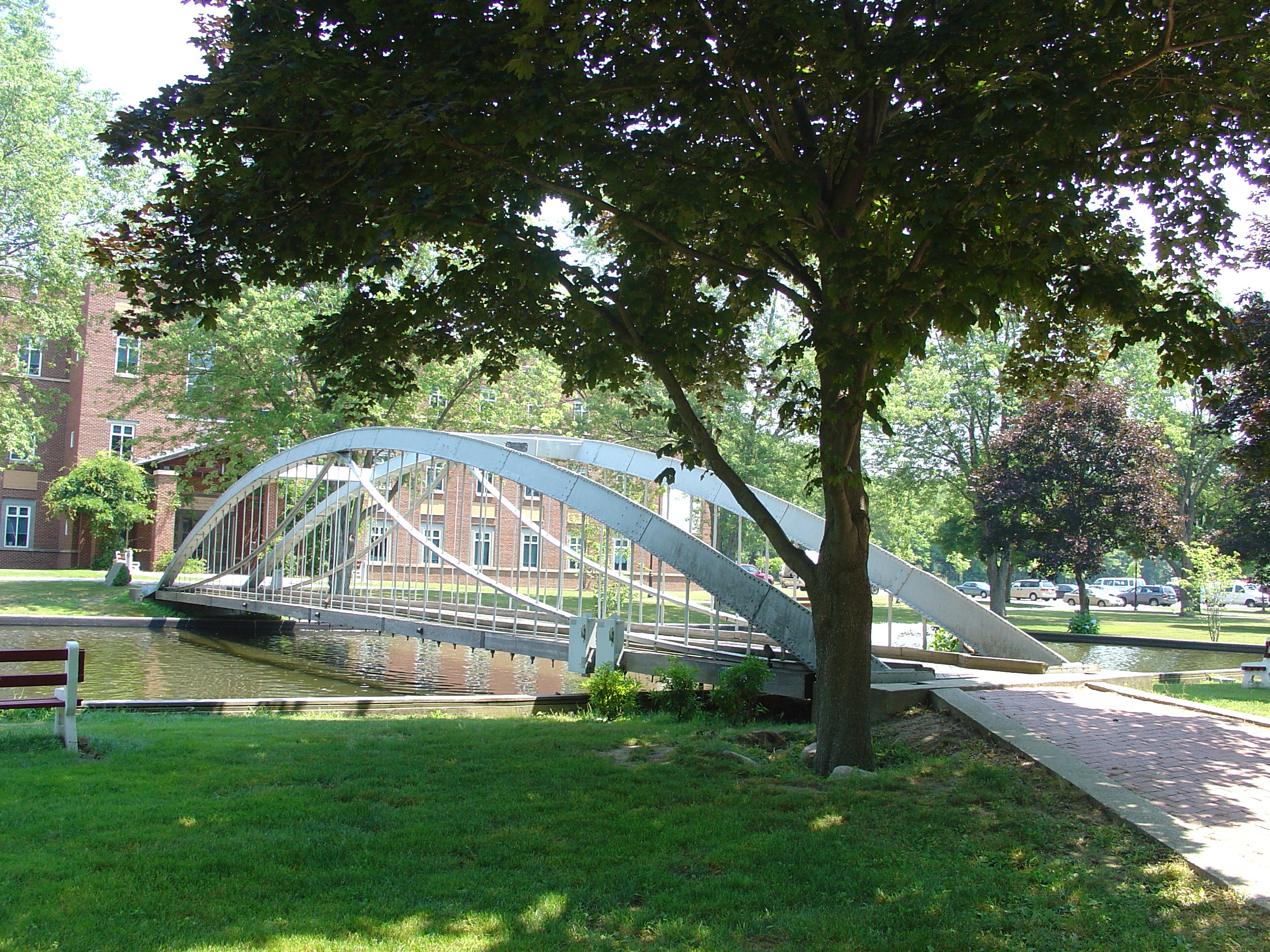
Moseley Wrought Iron Arch Bridge

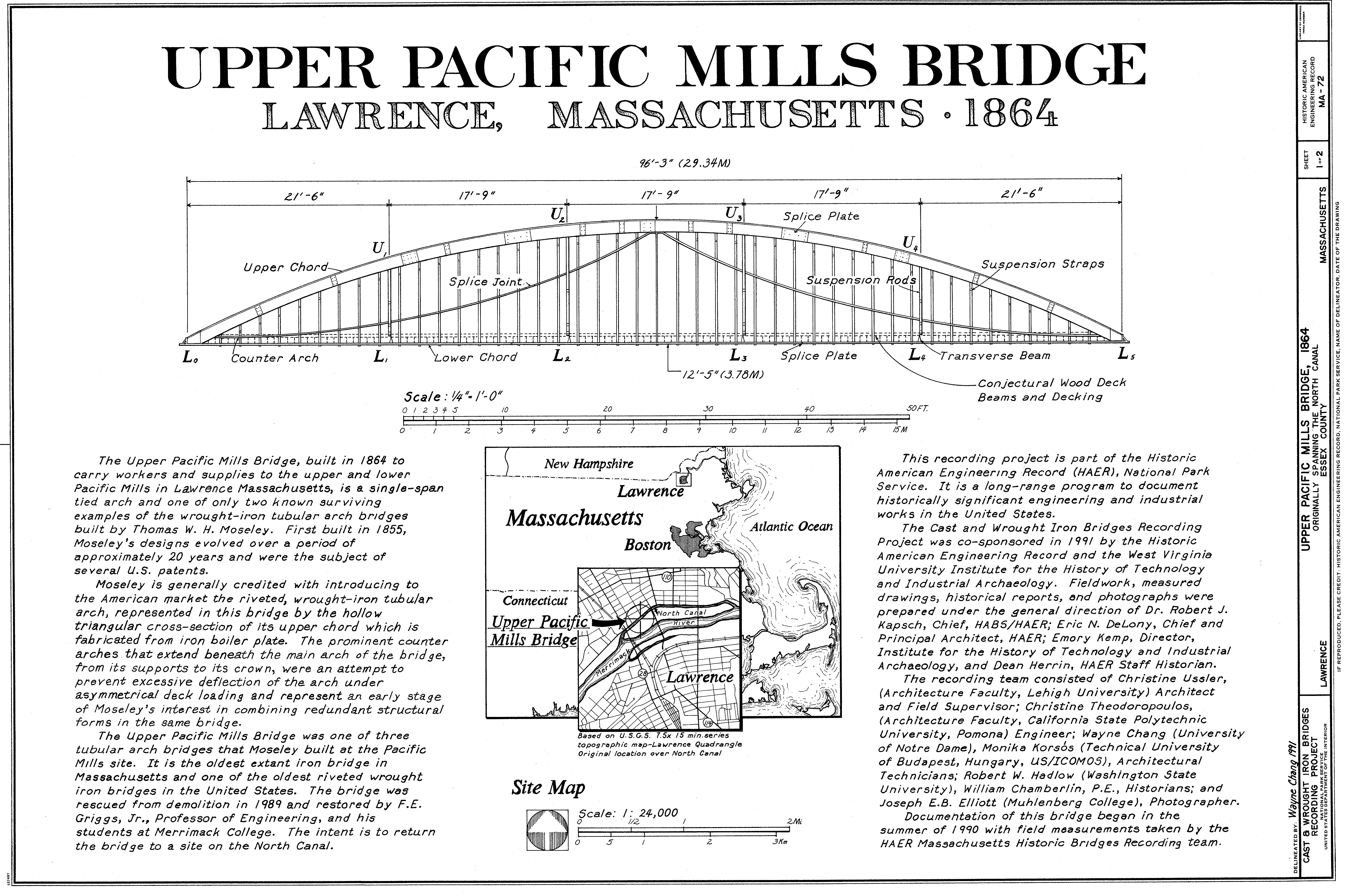
Moseley Wrought Iron Arch Bridge

The Moseley Wrought Iron Arch Bridge, also known as the Upper Pacific Mills Bridge, is a historic, riveted, wrought iron bowstring arch bridge now located on the campus of Merrimack College in North Andover, Massachusetts. It was the last of eight of this type spanning the north and south canals in Lawrence, Massachusetts built between 1864 and 1868. It was added to the National Historic Civil Engineering Landmark list in 1998 and was originally part of the North Canal Historic District on the National Register of Historic Place. It is the oldest iron bridge in Massachusetts, and one of the oldest iron bridges in the United States. It was the first bridge in the United States to use riveted wrought iron plates for the triangular-shaped top chord.

The bridge was completed in 1864 as Moseley Truss Bridge built by the Moseley Iron Building Works of Boston, to connect the Pacific Mills with Canal Street in Lawrence, Massachusetts, by spanning the North Canal. It partially collapsed in the late 1980s, but in 1989 it was removed to the Merrimack College campus in North Andover and was rehabilitated under the direction of Francis E. Griggs, Jr., Professor of Civil Engineering. It was placed over a campus pond as a footbridge, and was rededicated in this new location on October 23, 1995.

== See also ==
- Hares Hill Road Bridge
- List of bridges documented by the Historic American Engineering Record in Massachusetts
- Zenas King

== Sources ==
- Trautwine, J.C. (1874). "The Moseley Bridge". The Civil Engineer's Pocket-book: Of Mensuration, Trigonometry, Surveying, Hydraulics ... Etc. ... Claxton, Remsen & Haffelfinger.
