= Kimberton, Pennsylvania =

Unincorporated community in Pennsylvania, US

- Census-designated place
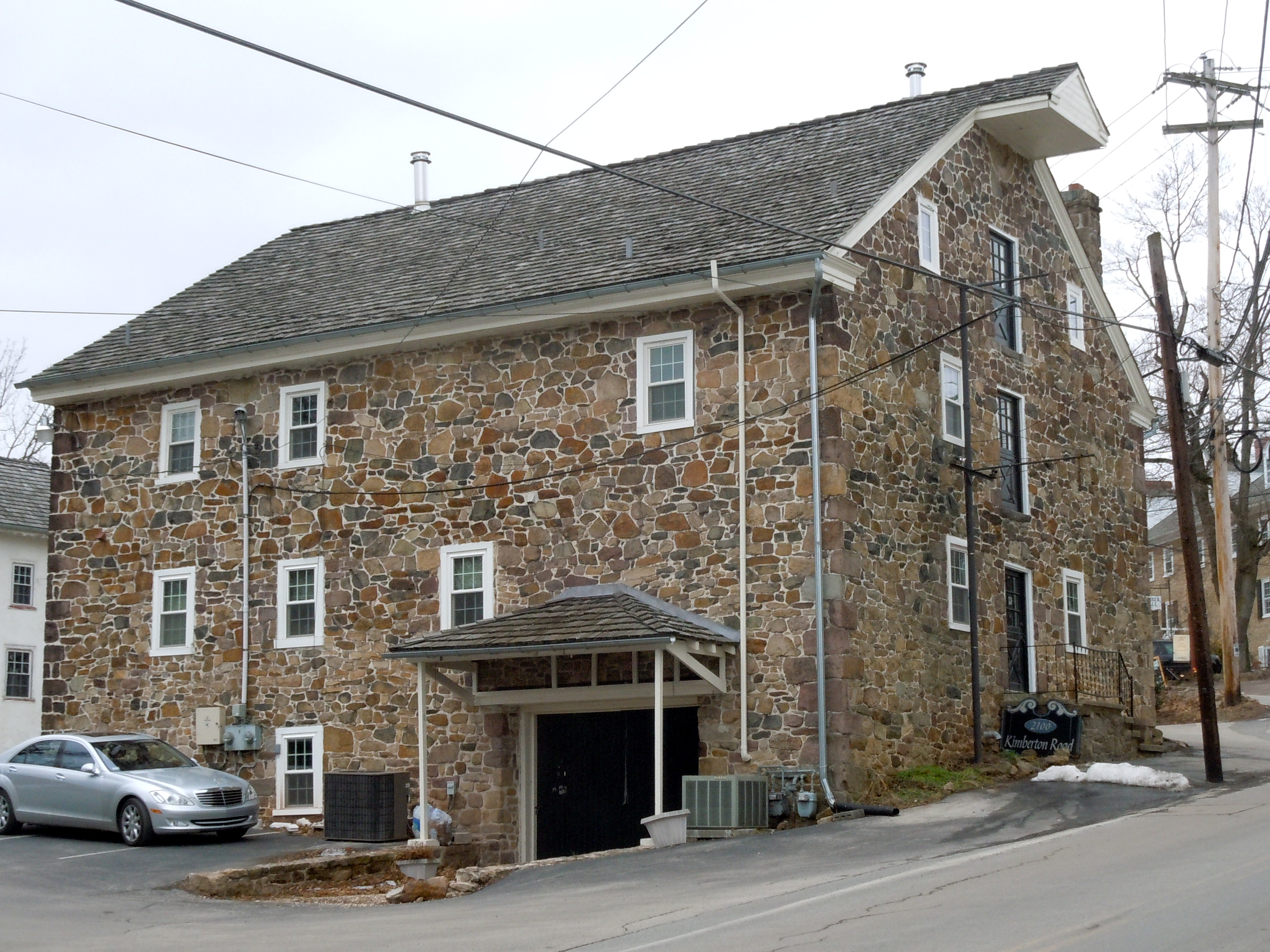
- Chrisman's Mill, now the post office

- Location of Kimberton in Chester County, Pennsylvania (top) and of Chester County in Pennsylvania (below)

- Location of Kimberton in Pennsylvania Kimberton, Pennsylvania (the United States)
- Coordinates: 40°07′50″N 75°34′20″W
- Country: United States
- State: Pennsylvania
- County: Chester
- Township: East Pikeland
- Elevation: 207 ft (63 m)

Population (2020)
  - Total: 568
- Time zone: UTC-5 (EST)
  - Summer (DST): UTC-4 (EDT)
- ZIP Code: 19442
- Area code: 610

Kimberton is an unincorporated community and census-designated place that is located in East Pikeland Township, Pennsylvania, United States. The Zip Code is 19442.

== History ==
Originally settled during the late 18th it remained unnamed until 1817. Like many surrounding villages in the Commonwealth of Pennsylvania, Kimberton developed around a tavern; in this case, the tavern was called Chrisman's. In 1796, the Chrisman's Mill began operating, drawing activity to the tiny village. It operated until 1938 and is currently the town's post office.

In 1976 (with a boundary increase in 1987), the Kimberton Village Historic District was established as a national historic district.

== Geography and demographics ==
Kimberton is located at 40°07′50″N 75°34′20″W (40.130N, -75.572W). The elevation is 207 feet.

In 2020, Kimberton had a population of 568.

== Notable people ==
- John S. D. Eisenhower, son of former United States President Dwight D. Eisenhower
- Esther J. Trimble Lippincott, educator, reformer, and author
- M. C. Richards, artist, educator, and spirituality author
- Owen Roberts, Supreme Court justice and University of Pennsylvania Law School dean
