= French Creek (Schuylkill River tributary) =

Creek in southeastern Pennsylvania

Coordinates: 40°08′11″N 75°30′36″W

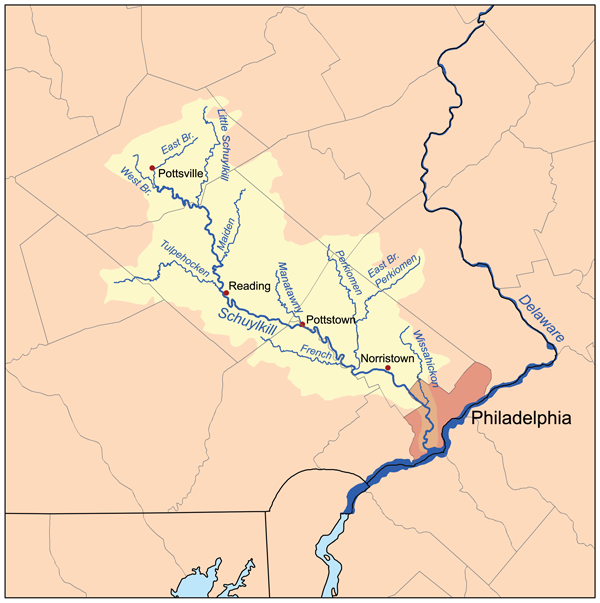
Schuylkill River watershed. French Creek joins the Schuylkill River between Pottstown and Norristown in the map.

French Creek, once known as Saukanac Creek, is a 22.6-mile-long (36.4 km) tributary of the Schuylkill River in Berks and Chester counties, Pennsylvania, in the United States. The water course was also known as the Vincent River, after Sir Mathias Vincent, who purchased land (now West and East Vincent Townships) along it in Chester County in 1686.

French Creek travels through the Hopewell Big Woods, including French Creek State Park, and joins the Schuylkill in Phoenixville. French Creek is a designated Pennsylvania Scenic River.

The French Creek valley was an important early industrial region, particularly iron, in the United States. Hopewell Furnace National Historic Site along French Creek interprets this history. The Phoenix Iron Works site in Phoenixville, an active iron and steel producer from colonial times until the late 20th century, sits astride the creek just before it joins the Schuylkill.

In 1994, the Green Valleys Association (GVA) with its 38 co-petitioners filed a petition with the Pennsylvania Environmental Quality Board for the upgrade of the French Creek watershed from a designation of High Quality (HQ) to Exceptional Value (EV). In September 1998, the French Creek watershed west of PA 100 and the Birch Run watershed were granted this upgrade. In 2003, Green Valleys and its 48 co-petitioners successfully filed a petition to obtain an upgrade from HQ to EV of the lower reaches of French Creek, from the Kennedy Covered Bridge in East Vincent and East Pikeland Townships upstream to PA 100 in South Coventry Township as well as the entire Beaver Run. This petition was accepted by the Environmental Quality Board in February 2004 and is currently being reviewed.

== See also ==
- List of rivers of Pennsylvania
