= Parker Ford, Pennsylvania =

Unincorporated community in Pennsylvania, US

- Unincorporated community
- Location within Pennsylvania
- Coordinates: 40°11′58″N 75°35′02″W
- Country: United States
- State: Pennsylvania
- County: Chester
- Township: East Coventry
- Elevation: 121 ft (37 m)
- Time zone: UTC-5 (Eastern (EST))
  - Summer (DST): UTC-4 (EDT)
- ZIP code: 19475
- Area codes: 610 and 484
- GNIS feature ID: 1183314

Parker Ford is an unincorporated community in East Coventry Township, Chester County, Pennsylvania, United States. Maps show it at the intersection of Pennsylvania Route 724 and Bethel Church Road/Linfield Road. Linfield Road crosses the Schuylkill River to Linfield, an unincorporated village in Limerick Township, Montgomery County.
