= East Coventry Township, Pennsylvania =

Township in Pennsylvania, US

East Coventry Township
- Township
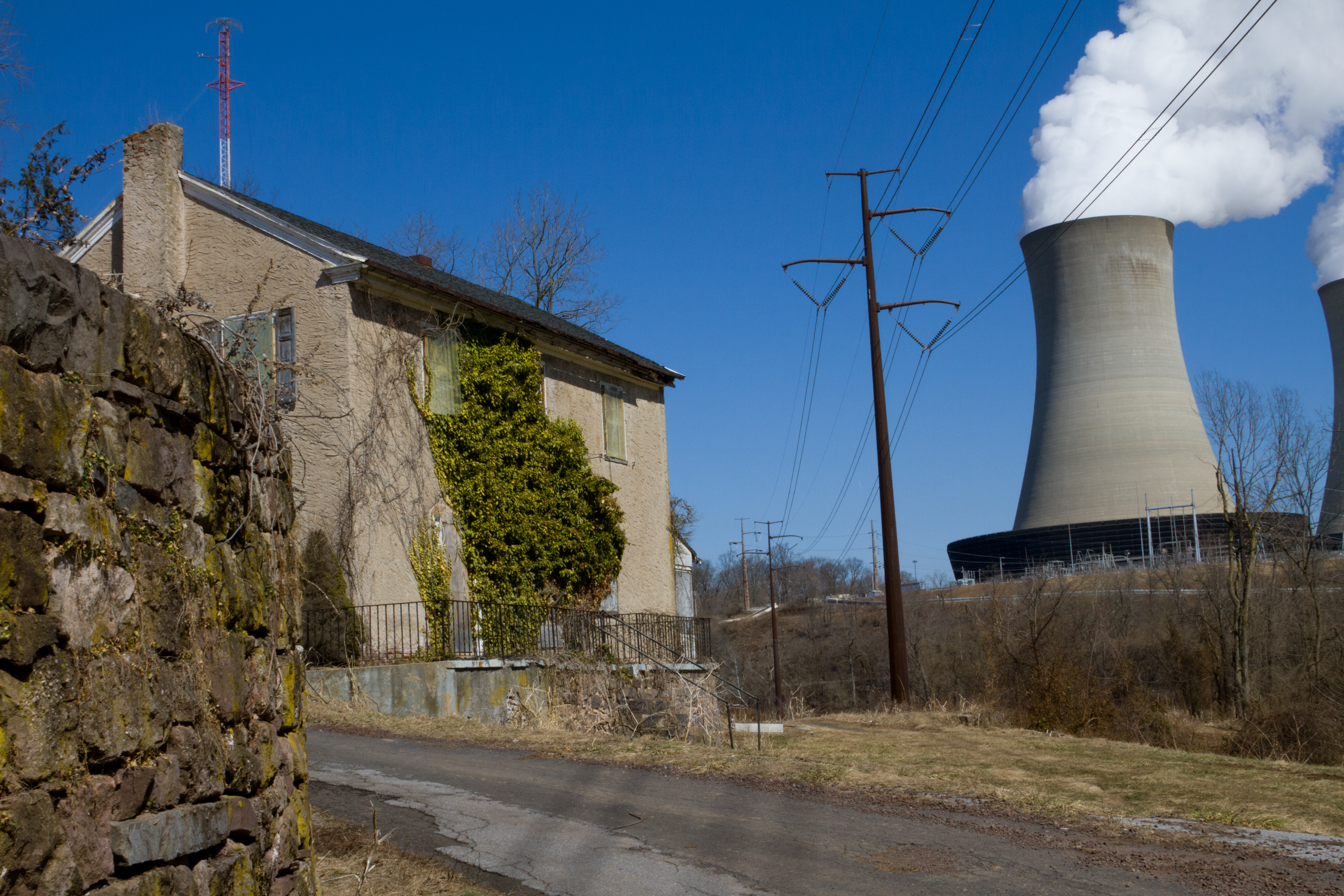
- An abandoned house in Fricks Locks Historic District (foreground) and Limerick Generating Station (background)

- Logo

- Location of East Coventry Township in Chester County, Pennsylvania (top) and of Chester County in Pennsylvania (below)

- Location of Pennsylvania in the United States
- Coordinates: 40°12′00″N 75°37′35″W
- Country: United States
- State: Pennsylvania
- County: Chester

Area
  - Total: 10.91 sq mi (28.26 km^{2})
  - Land: 10.66 sq mi (27.62 km^{2})
  - Water: 0.25 sq mi (0.64 km^{2})
- Elevation: 243 ft (74 m)

Population (2020)
  - Total: 7,068
  - Estimate (2023): 7,162
  - Density: 662.8/sq mi (255.9/km^{2})
- Time zone: UTC-5 (EST)
  - Summer (DST): UTC-4 (EDT)
- Area code: 610
- FIPS code: 42-029-21008
- Website: www.eastcoventry-pa.gov

East Coventry Township is a township in Chester County, Pennsylvania, United States. The population was 7,068 at the 2020 census.

== History ==
The township derives its name from Coventry, England, the native home of an early settler. Fricks Locks Historic District, and River Bend Farm are listed on the National Register of Historic Places.

== Geography ==
According to the U.S. Census Bureau, the township has a total area of 11.0 square miles (28 km^{2}), of which 10.8 square miles (28 km^{2}) is land and 0.2 square miles (0.52 km^{2}), or 1.55%, is water. The township includes the unincorporated community of Parker Ford.

Adjacent townships

- Lower Pottsgrove Township, Montgomery County (north)
- Limerick Township, Montgomery County (east)
- East Vincent Township, Chester County (south)
- South Coventry Township, Chester County (southwest)
- North Coventry Township, Chester County (west)

== Demographics ==
Historical population
Census	Pop.	Note	%±
1930	1,271		—
1940	1,304		2.6%
1950	1,499		15.0%
1960	2,183		45.6%
1970	3,284		50.4%
1980	4,085		24.4%
1990	4,450		8.9%
2000	4,566		2.6%
2010	6,636		45.3%
2020	7,068		6.5%
2023 (est.)	7,162		1.3%

At the 2010 census, the township was 92.5% non-Hispanic White, 3.1% Black or African American, 0.1% Native American, 1.4% Asian, and 1.4% were two or more races. 1.7% of the population were of Hispanic or Latino ancestry.

As of the 2000 census, there were 4,566 people, 1,649 households, and 1,246 families residing in the township. The population density was 423.4 inhabitants per square mile (163.5/km^{2}). There were 1,684 housing units at an average density of 156.2 per square mile (60.3/km^{2}). The racial makeup of the township was 98.38% White, 0.85% African American, 0.11% Native American, 0.22% Asian, 0.18% from other races, and 0.26% from two or more races. Hispanic or Latino of any race were 0.70% of the population.

There were 1,649 households, out of which 32.7% had children under the age of 18 living with them, 66.5% were married couples living together, 6.8% had a female householder with no husband present, and 24.4% were non-families. 20.4% of all households were made up of individuals, and 9.2% had someone living alone who was 65 years of age or older. The average household size was 2.64 and the average family size was 3.05.

In the township, the population was spread out, with 23.4% under the age of 18, 5.2% from 18 to 24, 25.8% from 25 to 44, 27.3% from 45 to 64, and 18.2% who were 65 years of age or older. The median age was 43 years. For every 100 females, there were 91.0 males. For every 100 females age 18 and over, there were 86.2 males.

The median income for a household in the township was $58,125, and the median income for a family was $68,384. Males had a median income of $48,750 versus $32,031 for females. The per capita income for the township was $27,257. About 2.0% of families and 1.9% of the population were below the poverty line, including 0.9% of those under age 18 and none of those age 65 or over.

== Education ==
The township is within the Owen J. Roberts School District. Owen J. Roberts High School is the zoned comprehensive high school.

== Transportation ==
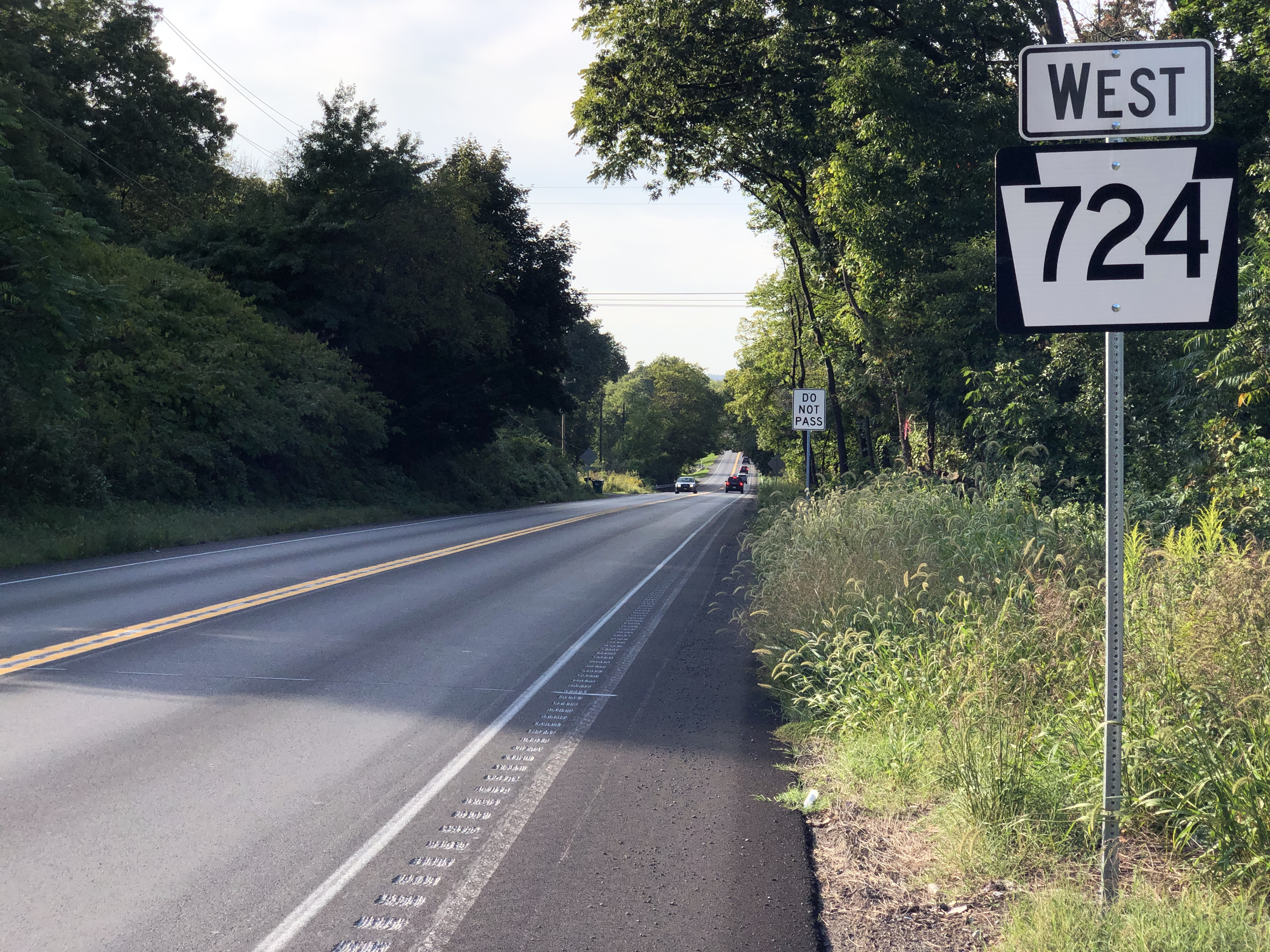
PA Route 724 westbound in East Coventry Township

As of 2018, there were 60.05 miles (96.64 km) of public roads in East Coventry Township, of which 11.09 miles (17.85 km) were maintained by the Pennsylvania Department of Transportation (PennDOT) and 48.96 miles (78.79 km) were maintained by the township.

Pennsylvania Route 23 and Pennsylvania Route 724 are the numbered highways serving East Coventry Township. PA 23 follows Ridge Road on a northwest-southeast alignment through the southern portion of the township, while PA 724 follows Schuylkill Road along a northwest-southeast alignment through northern and eastern portions of the township.

== Notable person ==
- Grover C. Talbot, Pennsylvania State Representative for Delaware County (1925–1934), 116th Speaker of the Pennsylvania House of Representatives (1933–1934)

== Points of interest ==
- Fricks Locks Historic District, an 18th-century village along the Schuylkill Canal

== See also ==
- Parker Ford, Pennsylvania
