= River Bend Farm =

Historic house in Pennsylvania, United States

Coordinates: 40.22973°N 75.59802°W

- U.S. National Register of Historic Places
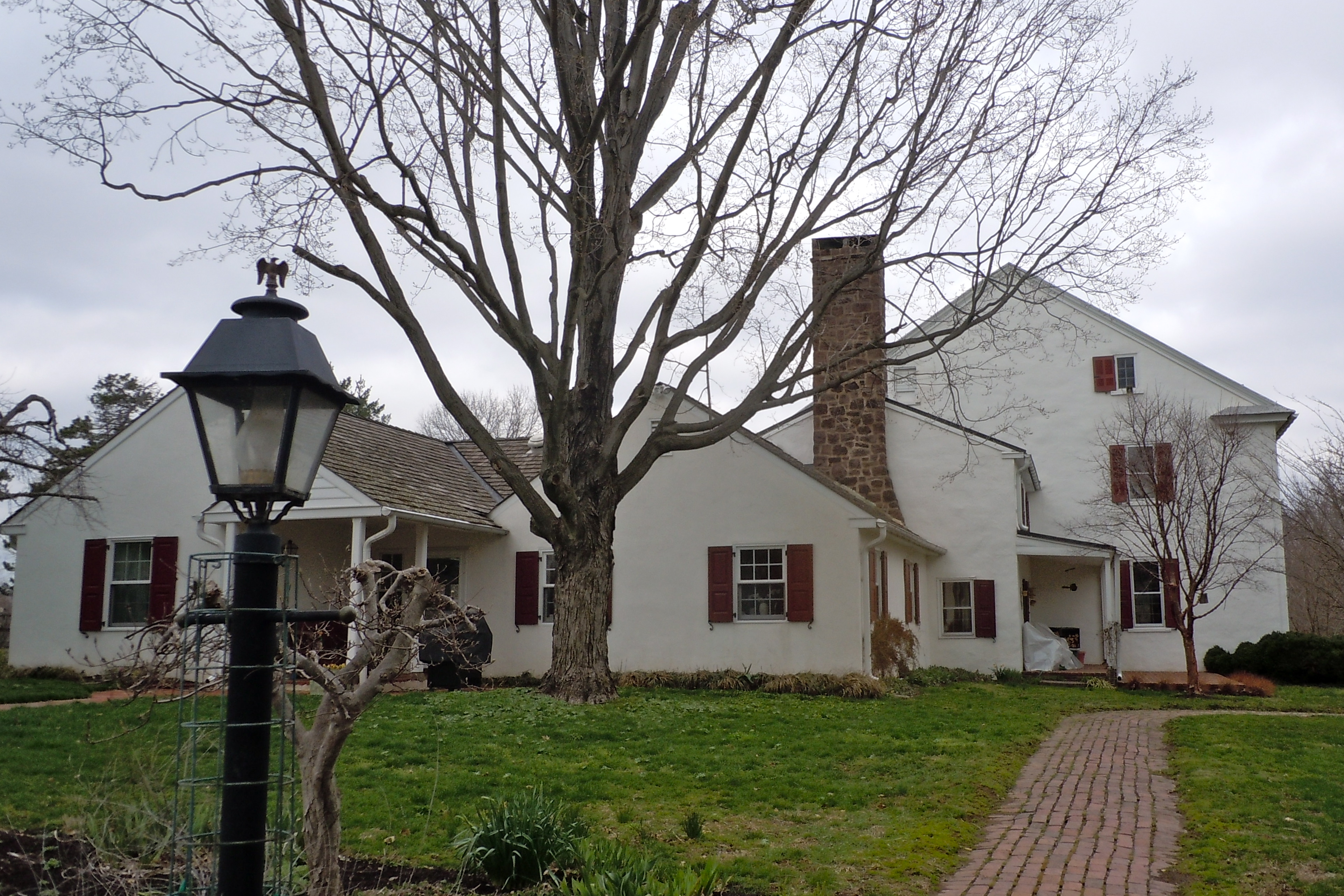
- River Bend Farm, April 2011

- Location within Pennsylvania Location within the United States
- Location: North of Spring City on Sanatoga Road, East Coventry Township, Pennsylvania
- Area: 5 acres (2.0 ha)
- Built: 1765
- NRHP reference No.: 80003468
- Added to NRHP: August 29, 1980

River Bend Farm is a historic farm located in East Coventry Township, Chester County, Pennsylvania in a bend of the Schuylkill River near Pottstown. The farm house is a good example of early Chester County construction techniques, being built with stuccoed stone walls and pegged rafters. The farm was owned, but not lived in, by Michael Hillegas, the first Treasurer of the United States. It was also owned by members of the Joshua family political dynasty.

The farm was added to the National Register of Historic Places in 1980.

== History ==
Henry Casdorp's family bought 600 acres (240 ha) on "Turkey Point," including the current farm site, on November 28, 1763, from Pennsylvania's proprietors, Thomas and Richard Penn for £60. They sold the land for £2,400 to Michael Hillegas and Jacob Winey on May 23, 1764. The property sold included a house, which was likely a log cabin built before the Casdorp purchase. The new owners, in turn, sold 300 acres sixteen months later to Daniel Hiester who bought the property for his son John.

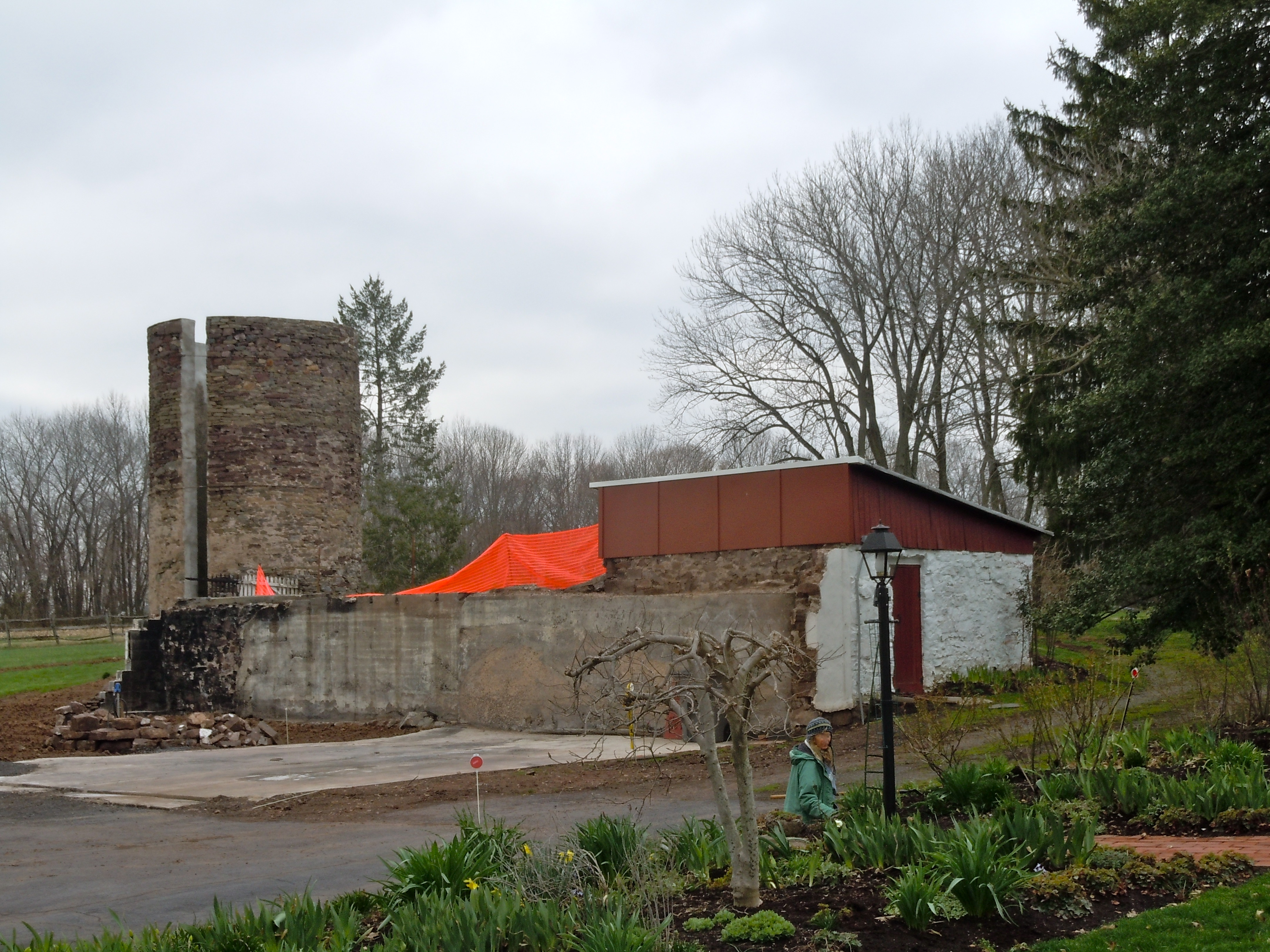
Site of the recently burned down barn, 2011.

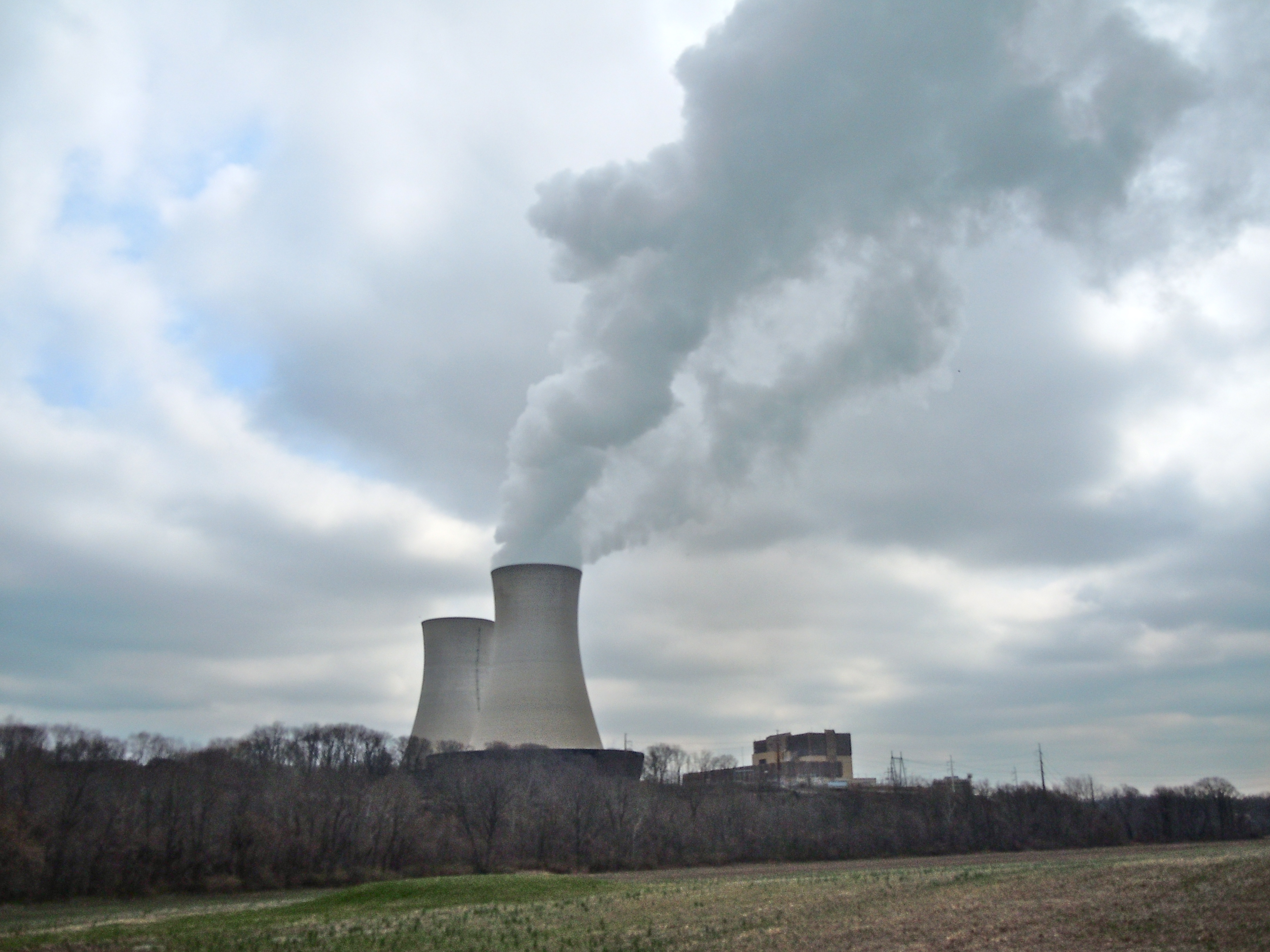
Limerick Nuclear Power Plant from the house

Daniel's sons were active during the American Revolution. His son Daniel became a brigadier general in the Pennsylvania Militia and was elected to the first four U.S. congresses, representing Pennsylvania, and was later elected to represent Maryland. The elder Daniel's son John fought at the Battle of Brandywine, and after the war was elected a major general of Militia. He was elected to the U.S. Congress in 1806, and John's son Daniel was elected to congress in 1808.

The house has two stories plus an attic. The first two stories have exceptionally high ceilings for the colonial period, 9 feet, 7 inches for the first floor and 8 feet, 11 inches for the second floor.

Another National Register of Historic Places listed site, Fricks Locks Historic District, lies about 600 yards south of the house. Starting in 1974, the Limerick Nuclear Power Plant was constructed to the east of the house, directly across the Schuylkill River.
