= Fricks Locks Historic District =

Historic district in Pennsylvania, United States

- U.S. National Register of Historic Places
- U.S. Historic district
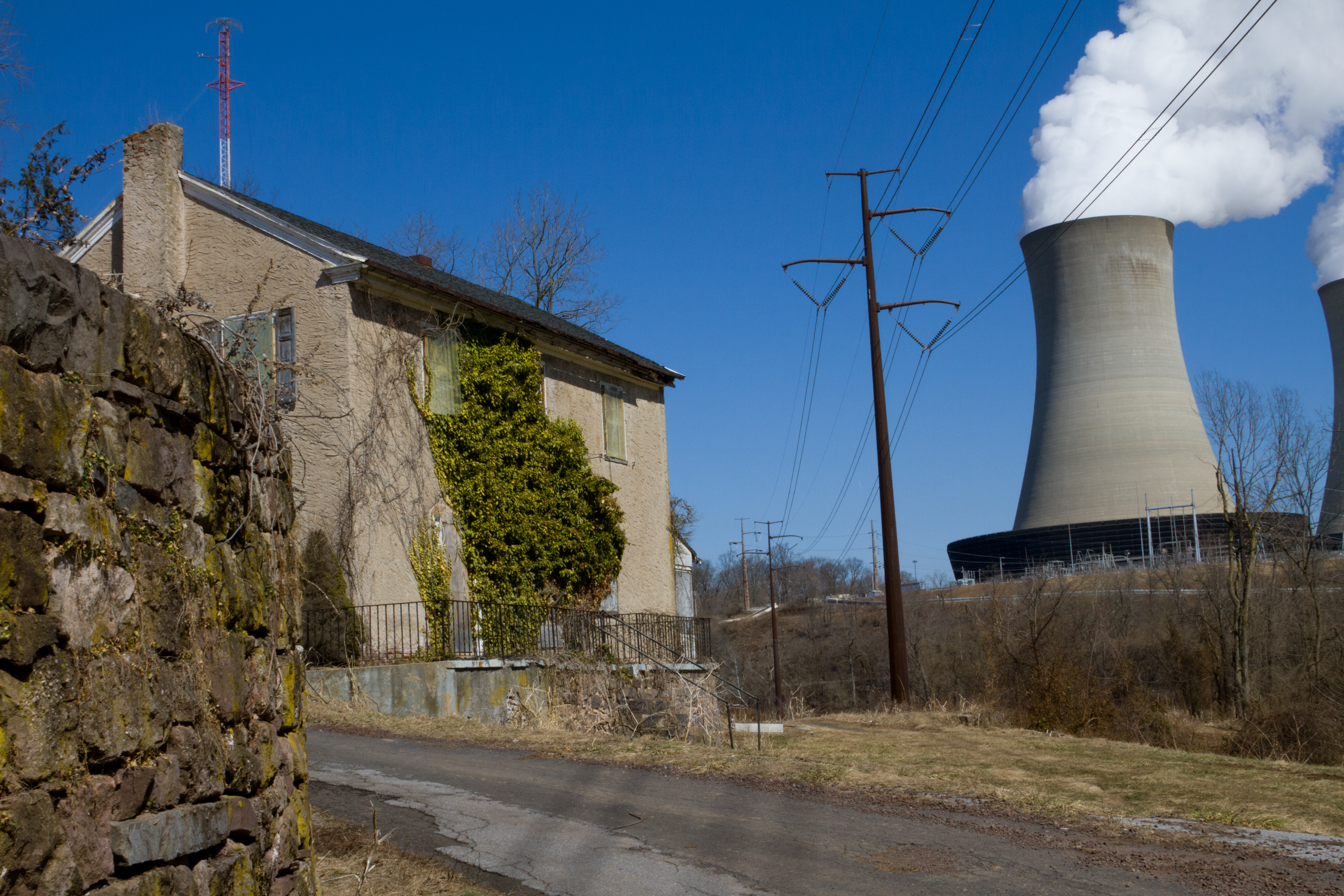
- Old house with Limerick Nuclear Power Plant in background

- Location within Pennsylvania Location within the United States
- Nearest city: Pottstown, Pennsylvania
- Coordinates: 40°13′21″N 75°35′47″W
- Area: 18 acres (7.3 ha)
- Built: 1824
- Architectural style: Federal, Swiss Bank House
- NRHP reference No.: 03001188
- Added to NRHP: November 21, 2003

Fricks Locks Historic District or more simply Frick's Lock is an abandoned village, along the also abandoned Schuylkill Canal, in the northeast portion of East Coventry Township, Chester County, Pennsylvania. This 18th-century village outlasted the canal, being abandoned in the late 20th century with the construction of the adjacent Limerick Nuclear Power Plant. The village on about 18 acres of land were listed as a historic district by the National Register of Historic Places in 2003. Frick's Locks is considered a modern ghost town and, although private property, attracts visitors.

== History ==
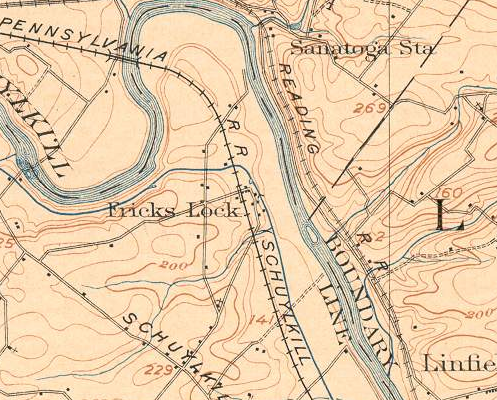
1906 topographic map of Frick's Lock showing canal and railroad. The nuclear plant was built to the northeast on hill 269.

=== Canal era ===
While some buildings date from the American Revolutionary War era, the village name was a result of the "Schuylkill Navigation" canal. The canal required construction, in the early 1820s, of a set of locks at that point along the Schuylkill River. Locks #54 and #55 were built on farmland acquired from John Frick and the village became known as Frick's Locks The two locks were built as a part of a larger network called the Schuylkill Navigation System, a system of 18 dams, 17 stone aqueducts, a tunnel and 118 other locks to straighten the meandering Schuylkill River into the Schuylkill Canal. The canal spanned both Chester and Montgomery counties and facilitated waterway transportation and the ferrying of goods, mostly coal, into Philadelphia. The canal opened in 1824. The village thrived due to the economic stimulus of the canal. Eventually the commercial canal traffic declined toward the turn of the century and gave way to the railroad. Frick's Locks had become the singular Frick's Lock after the Pennsylvania Schuylkill Valley Railroad arrived and built a station with the latter name. The canal was in use until late 1925, when floods filled in portions of it. The canal closed in 1930. During its peak, the canals had about 1,400 boats a year (or eight boats a day) pass through transporting about 1.7 million tons of goods, both coal and agricultural goods.

In April 1935, the State Emergency Review Board of the Works Progress Administration announced the development of Four Pines Camp, a camp for the homeless following the Great Depression. They rented 175 acres (71 ha) of farmland from two farmers to build the camp. Construction began in April and cost around US$100,000. The camp residents were sent from counties in the Philadelphia area, including Montgomery, Bucks, Philadelphia, and Chester counties. They were given housing, food, and US$1 a week to work farm fields in the camp. The State Emergency Review Board closed Four Pines Camp in October 1936. The buildings were dismantled in October and November and the lumber from the buildings sent to Fort Indiantown Gap. The remaining camp residents were put on state relief lists.

The canal was filled in starting in 1942. While the railroad eventually declined after Conrail was formed on April 1, 1976, the village remained inhabited until near the end of the 20th century.

=== Nuclear era ===
In the 1960s, Philadelphia Electric Company (PECO) began the process of building the Limerick Nuclear Power Station immediately across the river from Frick's Lock. The station went on line in 1986. During the project, PECO acquired all the land around the station site, which included Frick's Lock. By the time the station went on line, all of the residents had moved out. There are possibly conflicting stories as to the residents being bought out and relocated nearby and one that describes a 48-hour notice forced eviction. In any event the buildings were vacated and simply boarded up. There is evidence that some of the buildings were later occupied by an environmental study company retained by PECO.

=== Present day ===
In the 1990s, Paul S. Frick in an effort to preserve the property along with family history, began compiling all of the historical information and then hired Estelle Cremers who lived in the area, to assist him. He also wrote History of Frick’s Lock, Part 1, a history about the site. He paid for all the costs and work that led to the property being listed on the National Register of Historic Places on November 21, 2003.

In 1997, the Schuylkill River National and State Heritage Area gave a US$13,000 stabilization grant to keep the area from deteriorating. In 2001, the township expressed interest in restoring the site. In 2008, the locktender's house, built in 1824, caught fire.

In February 2011, East Coventry Township partnered with Exelon Generation, a subsidiary of Exelon Corporation, to preserve and protect the historic site. Under this new agreement, Exelon effectively donated the land and eleven historic structures at Frick's Lock Village to East Coventry Township, valued at an estimated $1 million. In 2013, a $2.3 million restoration was announced. In 2012, contractors renovated properties in the district. The restoration project received the 2013 Preservation Achievement Grand Jury Award from the Preservation Alliance for Greater Philadelphia.

In 2013, the township's historical commission began hosting free tours for a portion of the year. Today, the district is in the path of the Schuylkill River National and State Heritage Area and the Schuylkill River Trail. The district includes Manor House, built in 1821, and the oldest house in Chester County, built in 1752.

== Ghost town ==
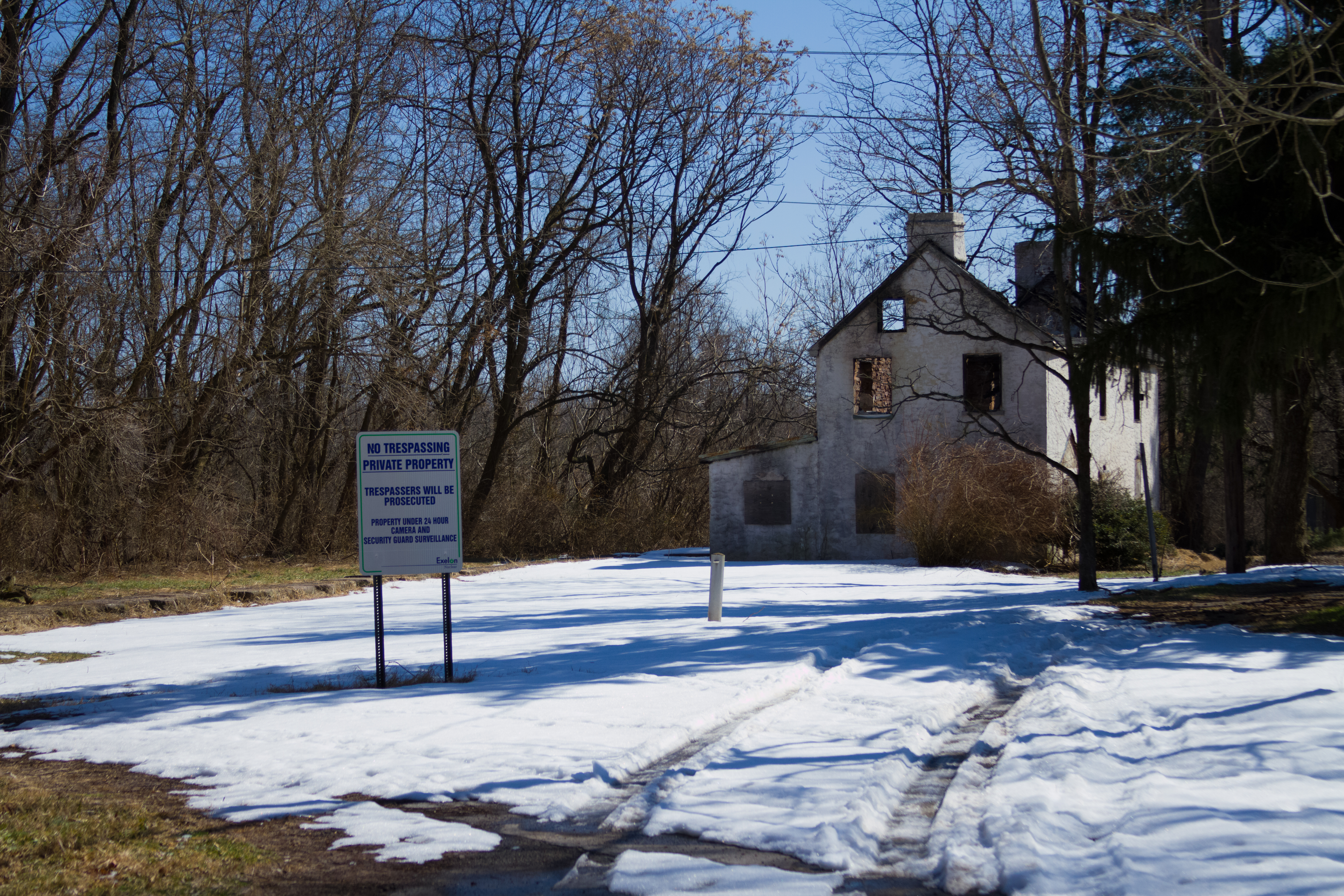
Entrance to Frick's Lock, with a sign forbidding entrance to the site. Note the burned-out residence.

Frick's Lock has developed a reputation of being haunted and has attracted vandals and partyers. The inclusion of the Frick's Lock in the 2005 book, Weird Pennsylvania, and numerous web photo essays of the buildings have increased its popularity. The web sites have also documented its increased deterioration, including the aforementioned vandalism and the collapse of some porch structures.

As of March 2008, Frick's Lock remained a hotbed for thrill-seeking amateur urban archaeologists and vandals. A fire destroyed the Lock Tender's House in February 2008. Since then, Exelon has made numerous attempts to clean up debris from the property and to close up open wells and open buildings.

== Gallery ==
Houses in Fricks Locks
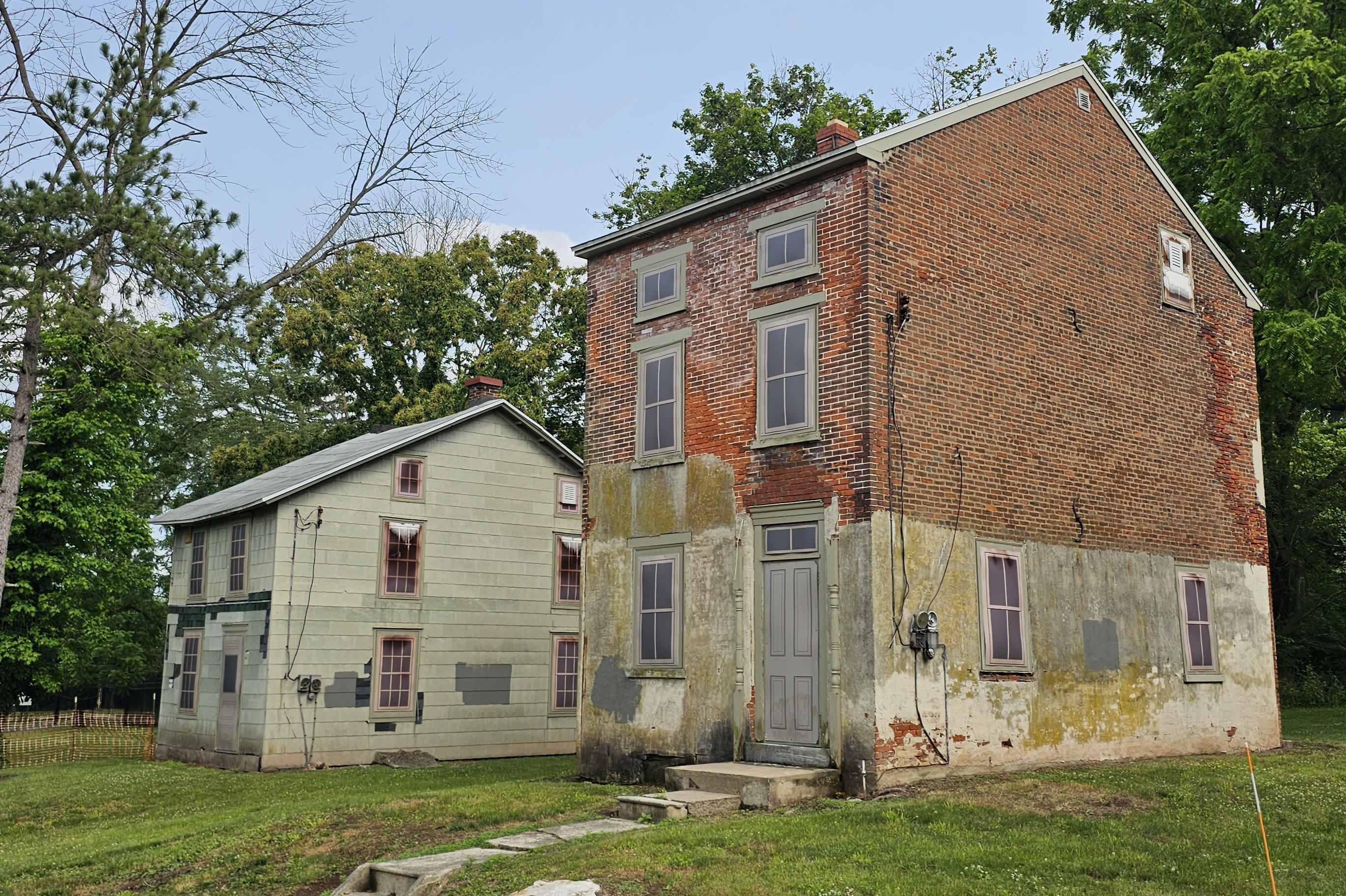
Side view of two houses in 2013

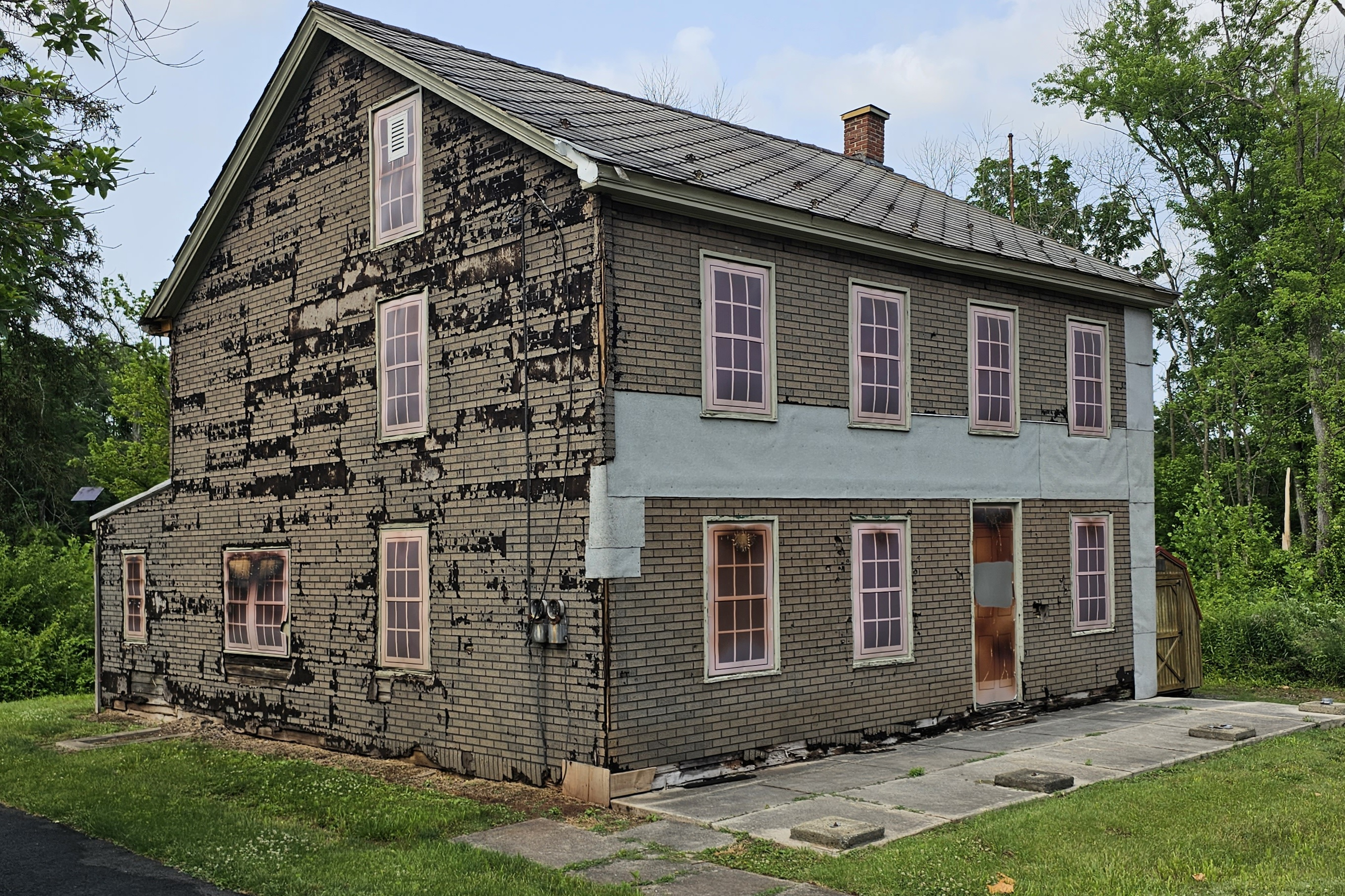
Oblique view of a house in 2013

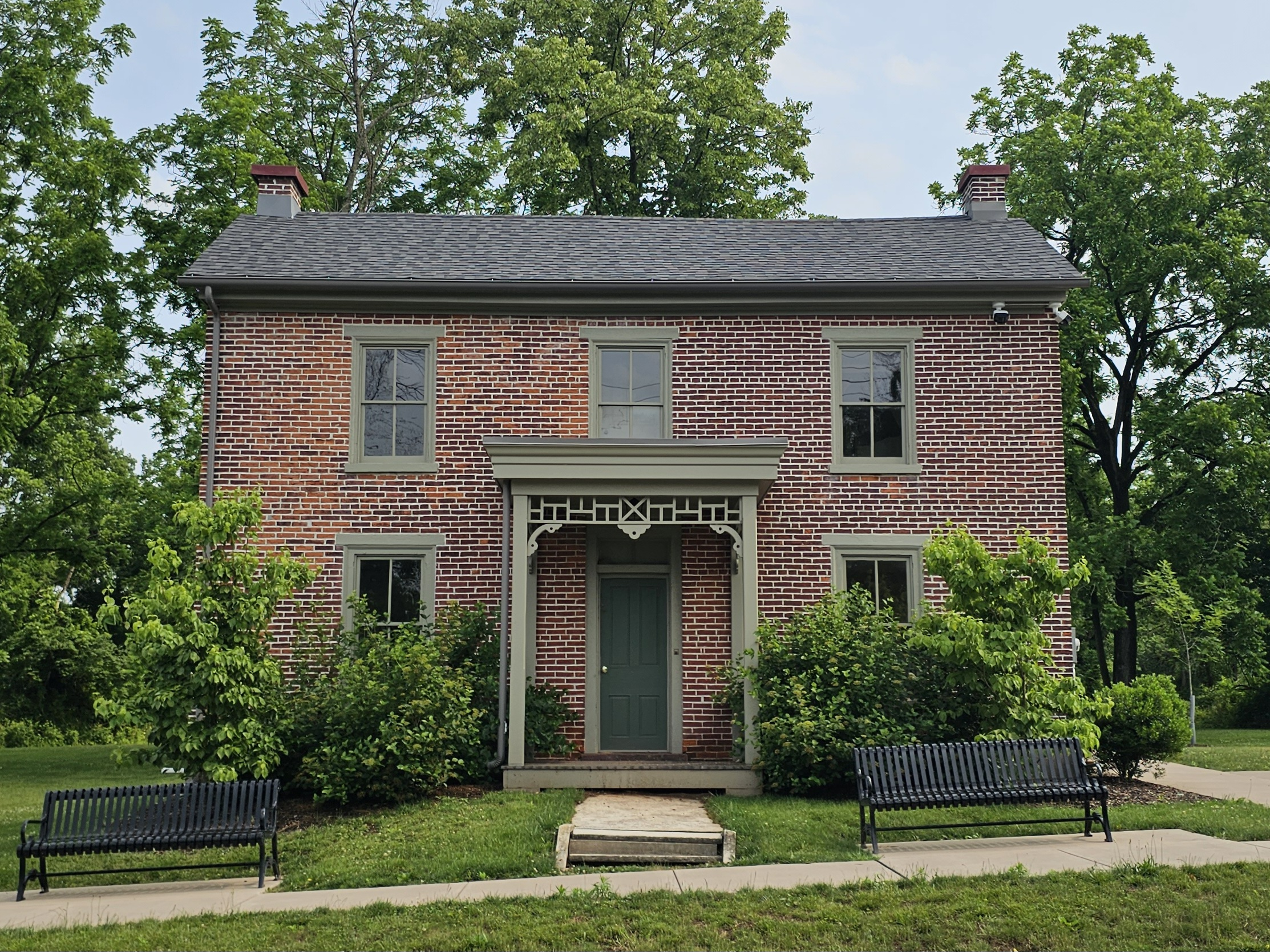
Front view of a house in 2013

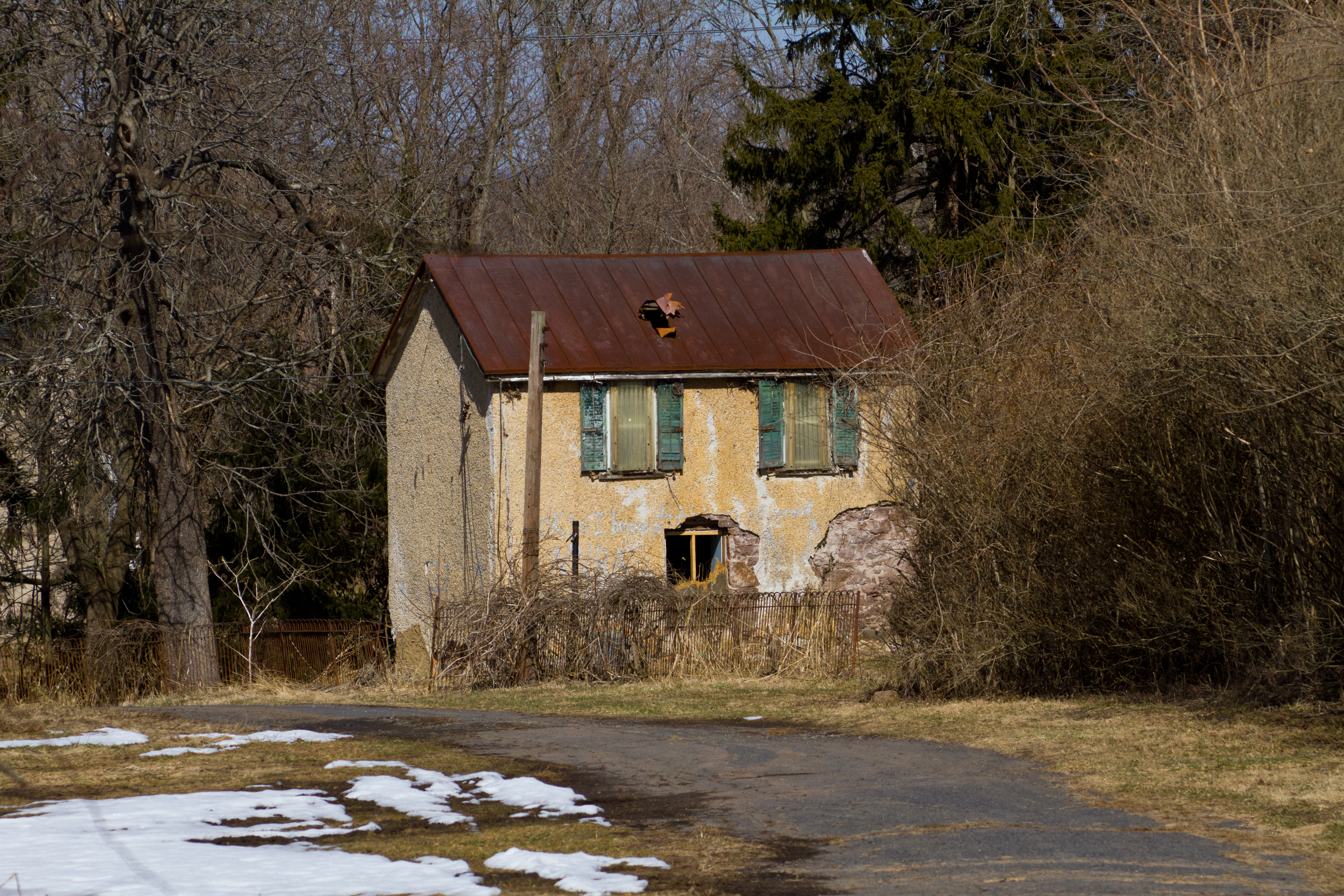
Abandoned house in 2010

== See also ==
- List of ghost towns in Pennsylvania
- River Bend Farm

== See also ==
- Schuylkill River National and State Heritage Area
