= Joseph Anthony (silversmith) =

American sliversmith (1762–1814)

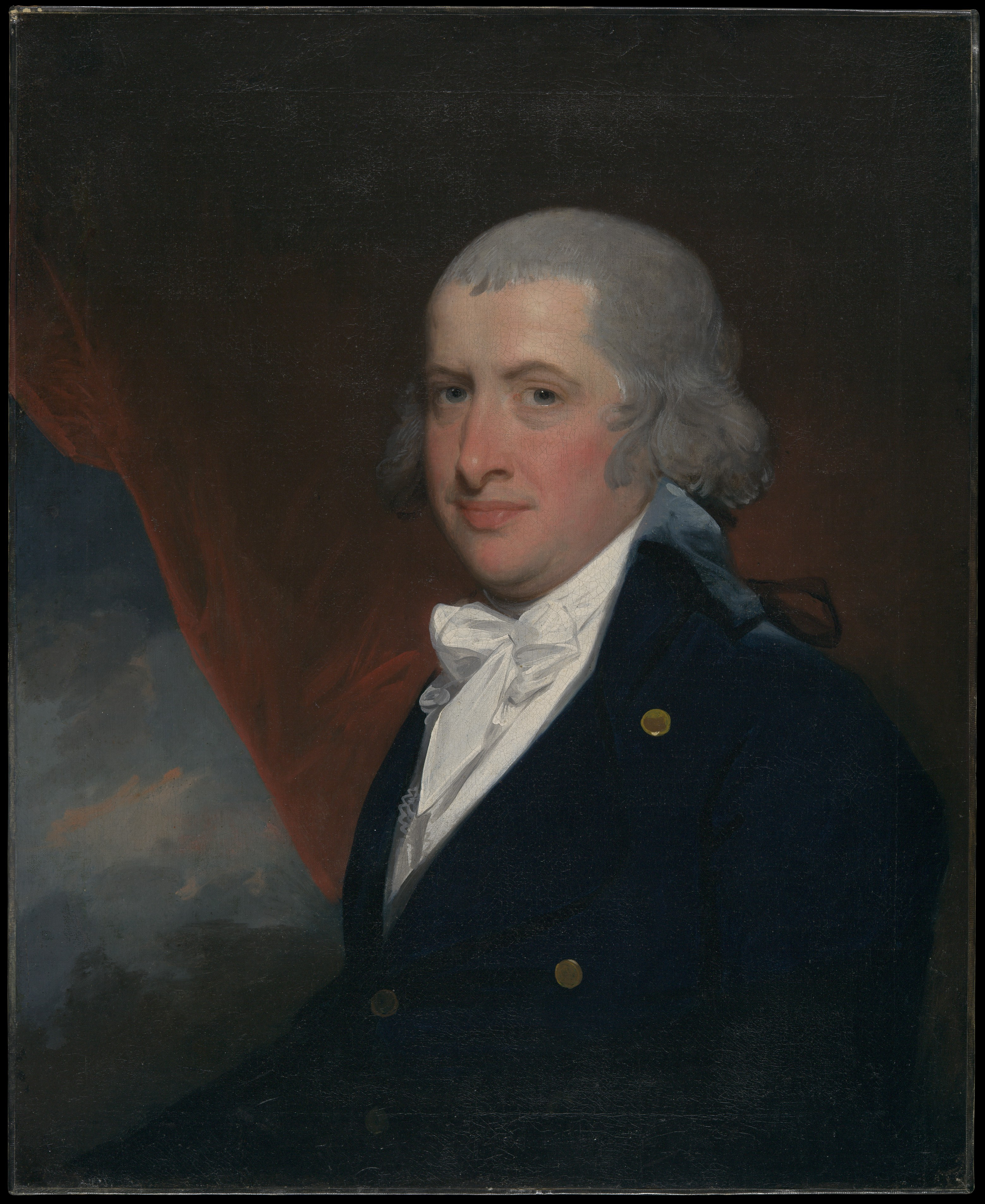
- Born: January 15, 1762; Newport, Rhode Island
- Died: August 5, 1814 (aged 52)
- Burial place: Christ Church Burial Ground; Philadelphia, Pennsylvania
- Occupation: Silversmith
- Spouse: Henrietta Hillegas
- Relatives: Gilbert Stuart (first cousin)

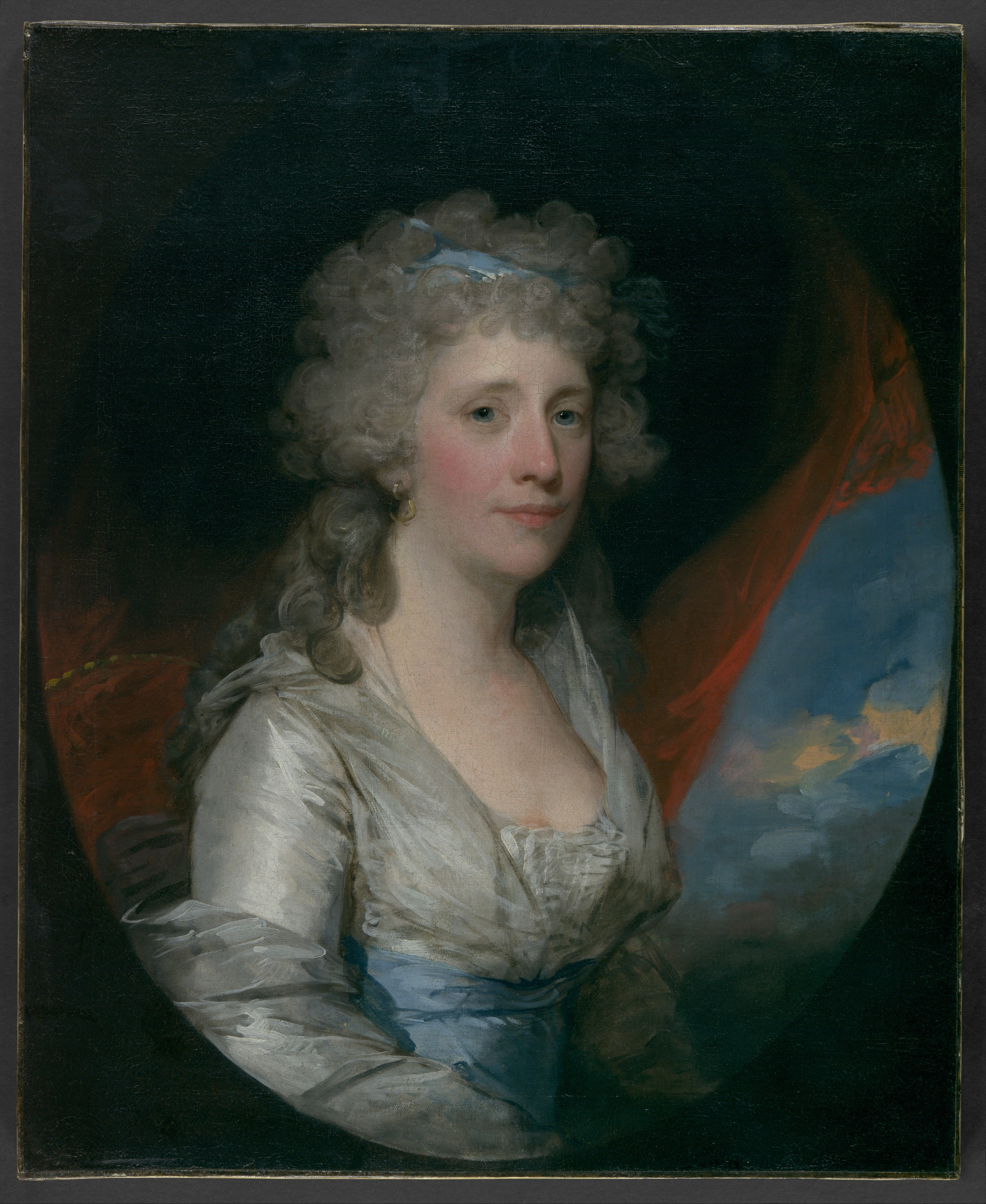
Anthony's wife, Henrietta Hillegas, painted by Gilbert Stuart (ca. 1795–98)

Joseph Anthony Jr., (January 15, 1762 - August 5, 1814) was an American silversmith.

== Early life ==
Anthony was born in Newport, Rhode Island, the son of a successful sea captain and merchant who relocated to Philadelphia around 1783, and first cousin of painter Gilbert Stuart.

== Career ==
He trained as a silversmith and became a successful business owner in Philadelphia, selling both his own wares and imported fine goods, and prominent in local society. From 1810 to 1814 he partnered with his sons, Michael and Thomas Anthony, as J. Anthony & Sons. He was one of the original subscribers to the Philadelphia City Dancing Assembly Fund.

== Personal life ==
In 1785, he married Henrietta Hillegas (b. 1766), one of ten children of Michael Hillegas, first Treasurer of the United States, and his wife, Henrietta Hillegas of Philadelphia. Hillegas made his fortune in sugar refining and iron manufacturing.
