= Samuel Meredith (American politician) =

American politician

2nd Treasurer of the United States
- In office September 11, 1789 – December 1, 1801
- President: George Washington; John Adams; Thomas Jefferson
- Preceded by: Michael Hillegas
- Succeeded by: Thomas Tudor Tucker

Personal details
- Born: 1741
- Died: February 10, 1817 Belmont Corners, Pennsylvania, U.S.
- Spouse: Margaret Cadwalader Meredith
- Parent(s): Reese Meredith; Martha Carpenter Meredith
- Relatives: George Clymer (brother-in-law); Elizabeth Meredith (sister)

Samuel Meredith (1741 – February 10, 1817) was an American merchant from Philadelphia, Pennsylvania. He was a delegate for Pennsylvania to the Continental Congress from 1786 to 1788.

President Washington appointed him Treasurer of the United States, and he held this office from 1789 until his retirement on December 1, 1801.

== Biography ==
Born in Philadelphia in 1741, Samuel Meredith was a son of Reese (or Rhys) Meredith and Martha (Carpenter) Meredith. His father was a prominent local merchant, and after attending Dr. Allison's Academy, he joined the family business.

Samuel would later expand the business in partnership with his brother-in-law George Clymer, who married his sister Elizabeth Meredith in 1765.

Samuel married Margaret Cadwalader on May 19, 1772. He lived his later life in Northeastern Pennsylvania. He spent time in Carbondale Township in Lackawanna County, Pennsylvania, where the local fire department bears his name.

== Death and interment ==
Meredith died near Pleasant Mount in Wayne County, Pennsylvania on February 10, 1817, and was interred in a private cemetery.

Political offices
Preceded by Michael Hillegas	Treasurer of the United States; 1789–1801	Succeeded by Thomas Tudor Tucker
