= Isaac Hunsberger House =

Historic house in Pennsylvania, United States

- U.S. National Register of Historic Places
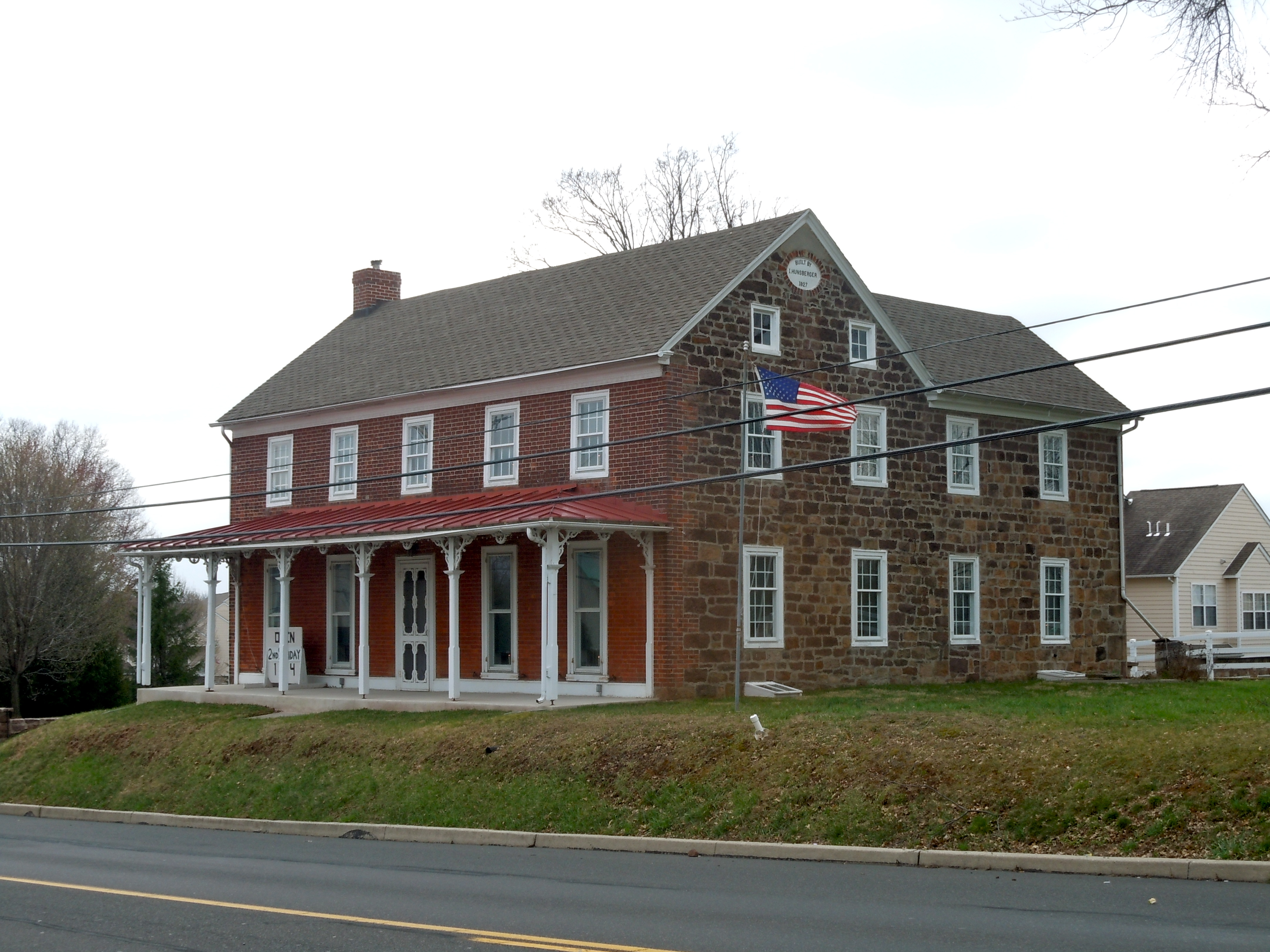
- Isaac Hunsberger House, April 2011

- Location within Pennsylvania Location within the United States
- Location: 545 W. Ridge Pike, Limerick Township, Pennsylvania
- Coordinates: 40°13′57″N 75°31′38″W
- Area: less than one acre
- Built: 1827, 1893, 1926
- Architectural style: Georgian, Late Victorian
- NRHP reference No.: 00000719
- Added to NRHP: June 22, 2000

The Isaac Hunsberger House is an historic home which is located in Limerick Township, Montgomery County, Pennsylvania, United States.

The house was added to the National Register of Historic Places in 2000, and is now home to the Limerick Township Historical Society.

== History and architectural features ==
Built in 1827 and modified in 1893, a rear addition was built in 1926. It is a 2 1/2-story, L-shaped brick and stone dwelling which has a five-bay front facade with a one-story porch with Victorian-style decorative elements. It was designed in a vernacular Georgian style. Also located on the property is a contributing bake house/summer kitchen.
