= Philadelphia Premium Outlets =

Shopping center in Montgomery County, Pennsylvania, U.S.

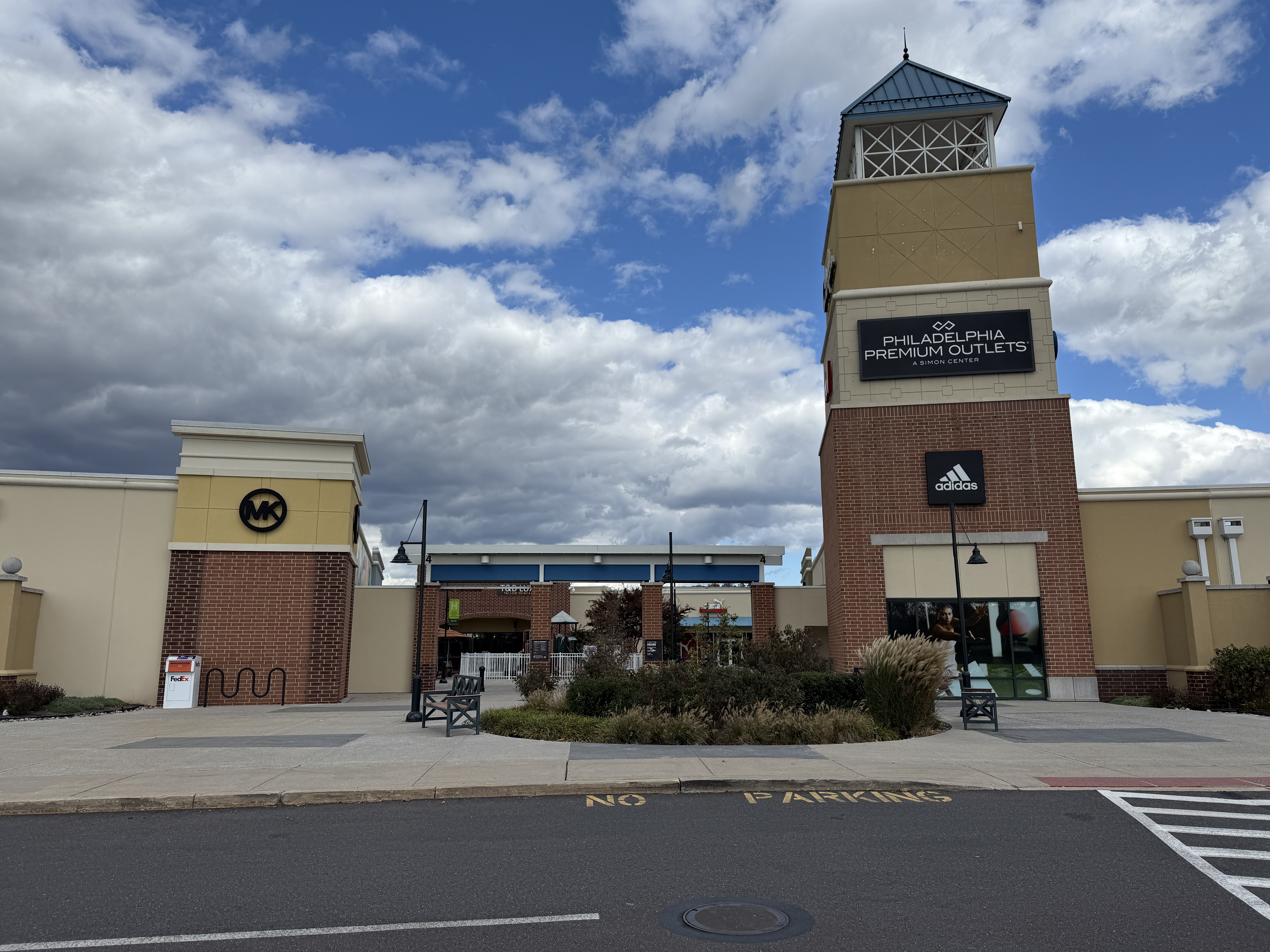
- Southwest entrance to Philadelphia Premium Outlets in October 2025
- Location: Limerick Township, Montgomery County, Pennsylvania, United States
- Coordinates: 40.23622°N 75.57070°W
- Address: 18 West Lightcap Road
- Opened: November 8, 2007; 19 years ago
- Developer: Chelsea Property Group, Inc. (2004); Simon Property Group (June 2004–2007)
- Manager: Simon Premium Outlets
- Owner: Simon Property Group
- Num. of stores: 150
- Floor area: 549,000 square feet (51,000 m^{2})
- Floors: 1 (open-air)
- Parking: Parking lot
- Public transit: SEPTA bus: 93; PART bus: Blue Line
- Website: premiumoutlets.com/outlet/philadelphia

The Philadelphia Premium Outlets is a 553,000-square-foot (51,400 m^{2}) open-air shopping mall located in Limerick Township, Montgomery County, Pennsylvania, 35 miles northwest of Philadelphia. It is located off an interchange of U.S. Route 422 near the Limerick Nuclear Power Plant. It is owned by the Premium Outlets division of Simon Property Group.

== History ==
The mall was originally planned to be developed by Chelsea Property Group. However, Simon Property Group acquired Chelsea for $3.5 billion in June 2004. Construction of the Philadelphia Premium Outlets began on September 20, 2006 with a goal to provide more shopping options for residents of Montgomery County as well as additional tax revenue and jobs for the community. The Philadelphia Premium Outlets opened to huge crowds at 9 a.m. on November 8, 2007 with 120 stores. An expansion completed in April 2008 brought the number of stores to 150.

The center celebrated its 10th anniversary in 2017. In addition to welcoming many new retailers over the years, it has also retained more than half of the original 120 that were in business there on opening day in 2007.

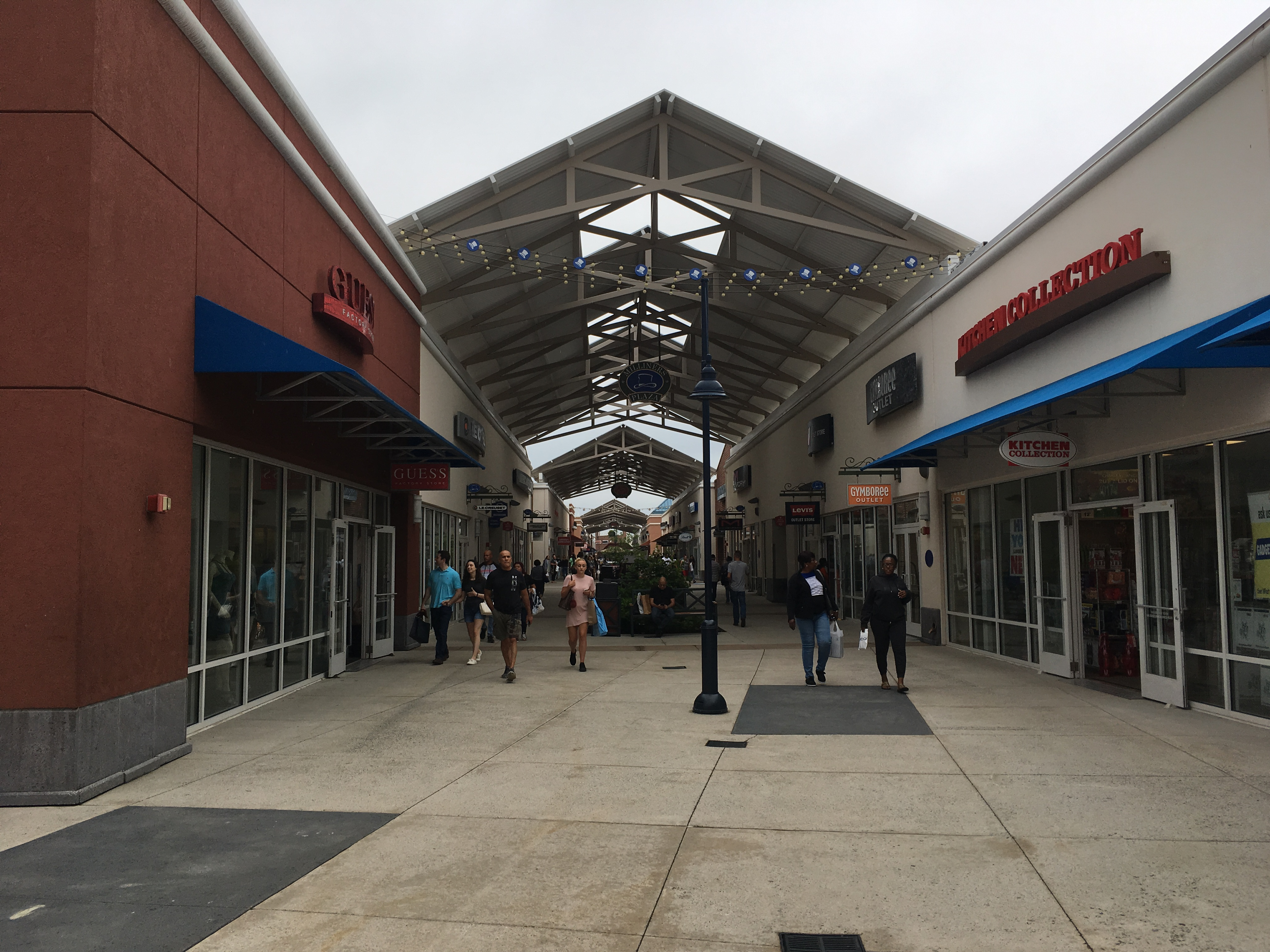
Philadelphia Premium Outlets near the southeast entrance
