= William and Mordecai Evans House =

Historic house in Pennsylvania, United States

- U.S. National Register of Historic Places
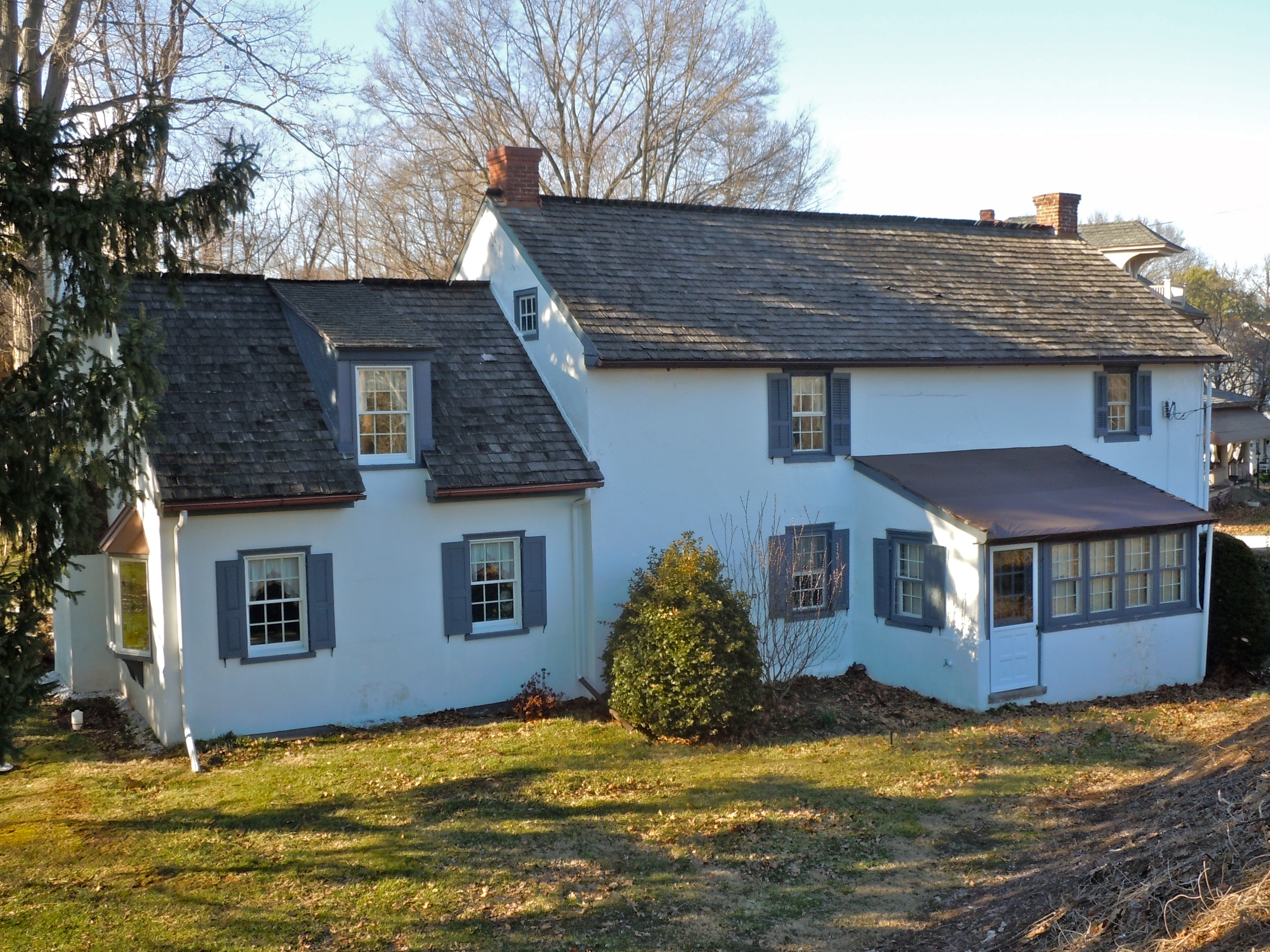
- William and Mordecai Evans House, March 2011

- Location within Pennsylvania Location within the United States
- Location: 1206 Main St., Linfield, Limerick Township, Pennsylvania
- Coordinates: 40°12′35″N 75°34′19″W
- Area: less than one acre
- Built: c. 1720, 1763, 1984
- NRHP reference No.: 05000332
- Added to NRHP: April 20, 2005

The William and Mordecai Evans House, also known as the Evans Log & Stone House, is an historic home that is located in Limerick Township, Montgomery County, Pennsylvania, United States.

It was added to the National Register of Historic Places in 2005.

== History and architectural features ==
The original log house was built circa 1720, with a stone addition erected in 1763 and a frame addition that was built in 1984. It is a 2 1/2-story, four-bay, stuccoed stone and log dwelling, with basement. Also located on the property are a contributing bake oven and original well. The house briefly became the headquarters for General George Washington on September 19, 1777, after the Battle of Brandywine and Battle of the Clouds at Malvern.
