= Limerick Township, Pennsylvania =

Township in Pennsylvania, US

Limerick Township
- Township
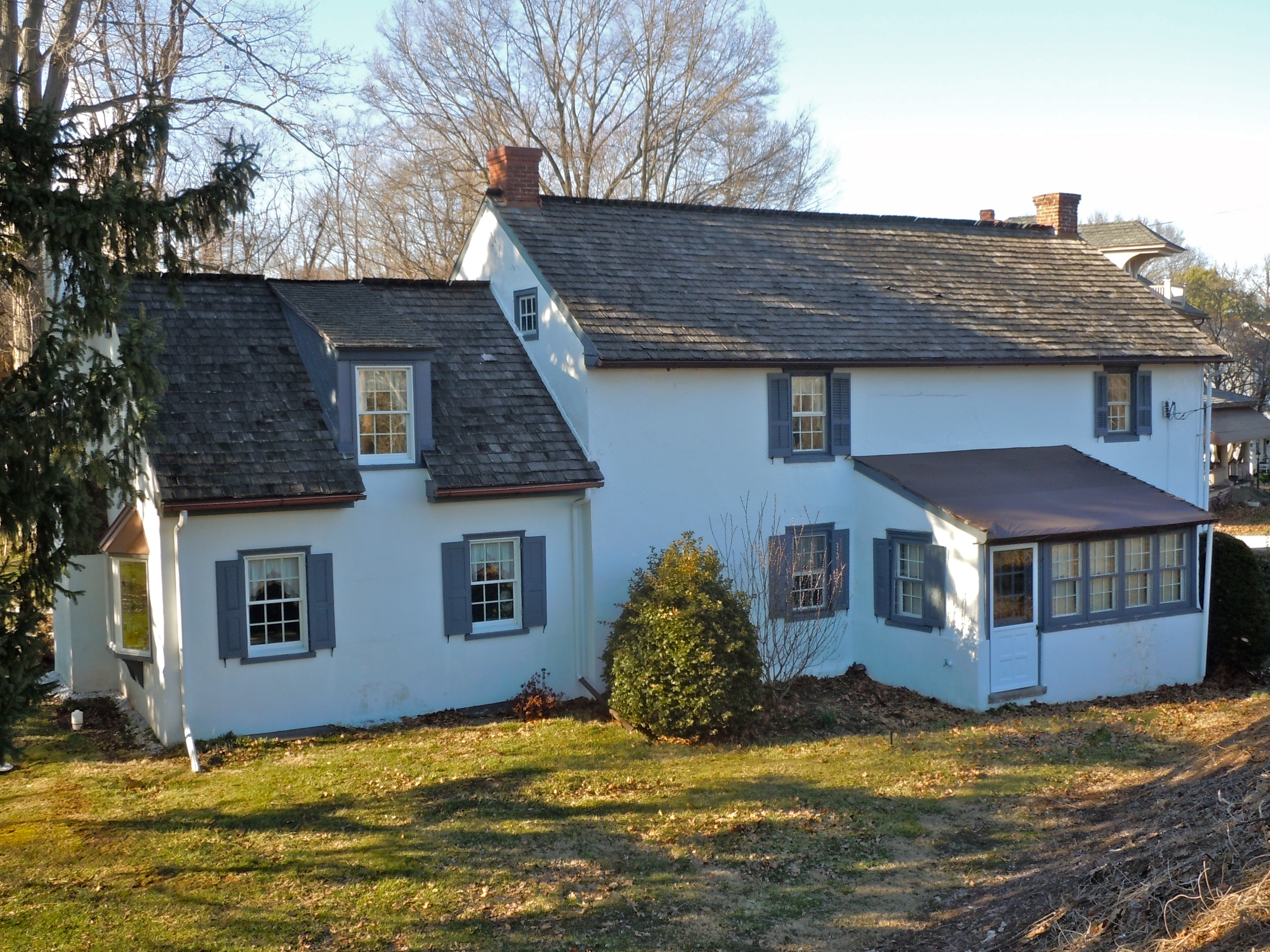
- William and Mordecai Evans House, built 1763

- Flag Seal

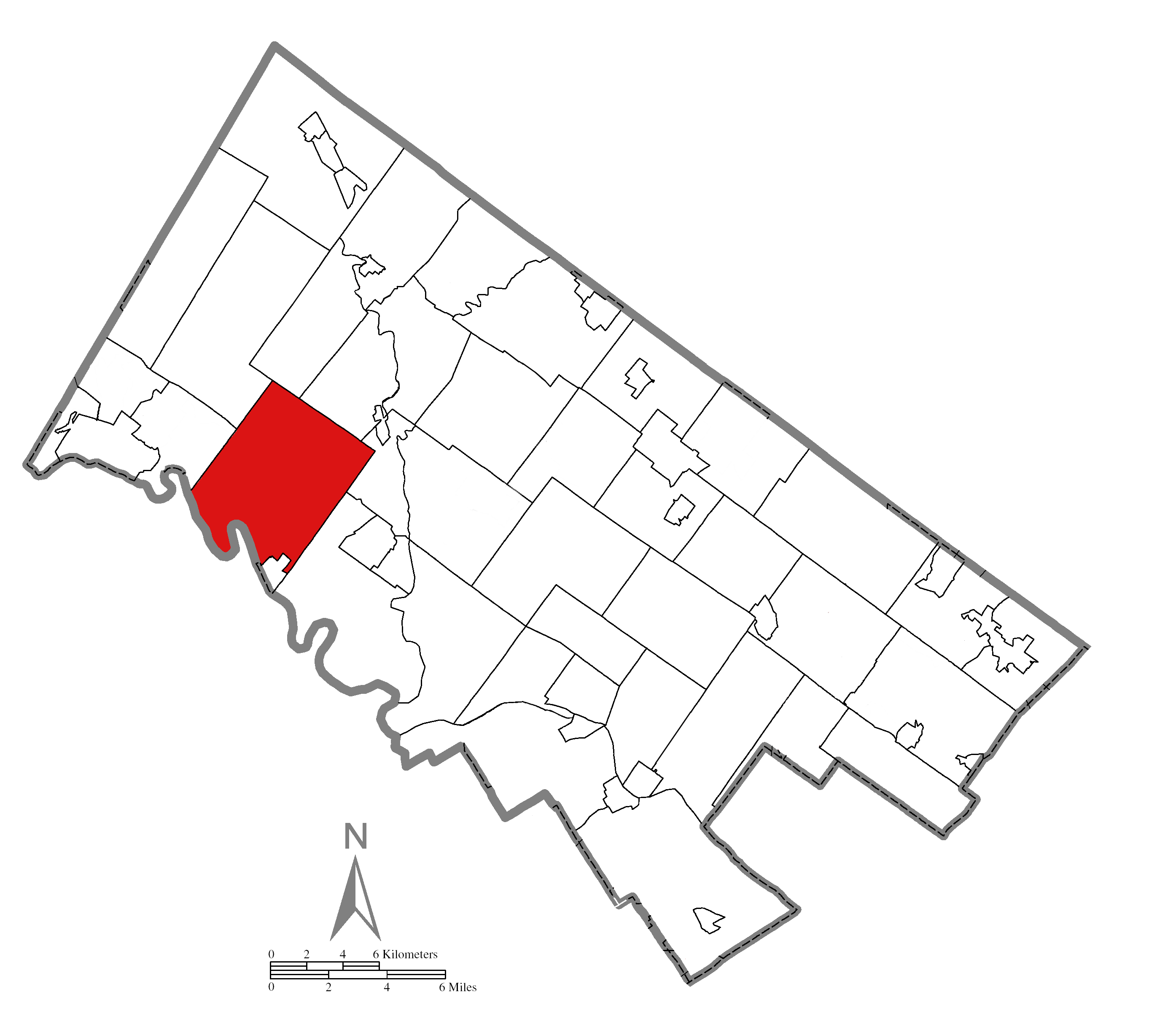
- Location of Limerick Township in Montgomery County, Pennsylvania
- Coordinates: 40°13′18″N 75°30′41″W
- Country: United States
- State: Pennsylvania
- County: Montgomery

Area
  - Total: 22.71 sq mi (58.82 km^{2})
  - Land: 22.50 sq mi (58.27 km^{2})
  - Water: 0.21 sq mi (0.55 km^{2})
- Elevation: 276 ft (84 m)

Population (2010)
  - Total: 20,651
  - Estimate (2016): 20,651
  - Density: 844.2/sq mi (325.96/km^{2})
- Time zone: UTC-5 (EST)
  - Summer (DST): UTC-4 (EDT)
- ZIP Codes: 19468, 19464, 19473, 18074
- Area codes: 610 and 484
- FIPS code: 42-091-43312
- Website: www.limerickpa.org

Limerick Township is a township in Montgomery County, Pennsylvania, United States.

== History ==
The township was named for the hometown of early settler William Evans, whose family arrived in the area from Limerick, Ireland in 1698. The township is mentioned in Philadelphia court records in the 1710s, but formal proceedings recording the township's boundaries were not entered until March Sessions 1726. Royersford was created from its southeastern corner in 1879. Limerick Township is a member of the Spring-Ford Area School District. The township grew from a 1990 population of 6,600 to 18,074 as of the 2010 census. On July 27, 1994, a deadly tornado struck parts of Limerick Township, killing an infant and her parents. The most severely affected area was the Hamlet housing development.

The William and Mordecai Evans House and Isaac Hunsberger House are listed on the National Register of Historic Places. John McClellan Hood, father of U.S. Army surveyor Washington Hood, built Hood Mansion in 1834. The estate was abandoned in 2008 and demolished in 2024.

== Geography ==
According to the United States Census Bureau, the township has a total area of 22.8 square miles (59.0 km^{2}), of which 22.6 square miles (58.5 km^{2}) is land and 0.2 square mile (0.5 km^{2}) (0.92%) is water. The township is drained by the Schuylkill River, which separates it from Chester County. Its villages include Barlow Heights, Limerick, Linfield, and Neiffer.

Limerick Township is 34 miles (55 km) northwest of Center City, Philadelphia. The climate is hot-summer humid continental and average monthly temperatures in the village of Limerick range from 30.3 °F in January to 74.8 °F in July. The hardiness zones are 6b and 7a.

=== Neighboring municipalities ===
- Lower Pottsgrove Township (west)
- New Hanover Township (northwest)
- Upper Frederick Township (north)
- Lower Frederick Township (northeast)
- Perkiomen Township (east)
- Upper Providence Township (southeast)
- Royersford (south)
- East Vincent Township, Chester County (southwest)
- East Coventry Township, Chester County (southwest)

== Demographics ==
Historical population
Census	Pop.	Note	%±
1800	999		—
1810	1,282		28.3%
1820	1,577		23.0%
1830	1,743		10.5%
1840	1,786		2.5%
1850	2,165		21.2%
1860	2,413		11.5%
1870	2,600		7.7%
1880	2,365		−9.0%
1890	2,224		−6.0%
1900	2,250		1.2%
1910	2,267		0.8%
1920	2,400		5.9%
1930	2,656		10.7%
1940	2,769		4.3%
1950	3,290		18.8%
1960	5,110		55.3%
1970	5,556		8.7%
1980	5,298		−4.6%
1990	6,691		26.3%
2000	13,534		102.3%
2010	18,074		33.5%
2020	20,458		13.2%

As of the 2010 census, the township was 91.5% White, 3.4% Black or African American, 0.1% Native American, 3.2% Asian, and 1.8% of the population were of Hispanic or Latino ancestry. 1.3% were two or more races. .

As of the census of 2000, there were 13,534 people, 5,143 households, and 3,744 families residing in the township. The population density was 599.6 inhabitants per square mile (231.5/km^{2}). There were 5,442 housing units at an average density of 241.1 per square mile (93.1/km^{2}). The racial makeup of the township was 95.10% White, 2.11% African American, 0.19% Native American, 1.29% Asian, 0.44% from other races, and 0.86% from two or more races. Hispanic or Latino of any race were 1.32% of the population.

There were 5,143 households, out of which 37.3% had children under the age of 18 living with them, 62.6% were married couples living together, 6.7% had a female householder with no husband present, and 27.2% were non-families. 21.2% of all households were made up of individuals, and 4.9% had someone living alone who was 65 years of age or older. The average household size was 2.63 and the average family size was 3.09.

In the township the population was spread out, with 26.8% under the age of 18, 5.4% from 18 to 24, 40.2% from 25 to 44, 19.2% from 45 to 64, and 8.5% who were 65 years of age or older. The median age was 34 years. For every 100 females there were 98.6 males. For every 100 females age 18 and over, there were 96.0 males.

The median income for a household in the township was $64,752, and the median income for a family was $73,296. Males had a median income of $46,351 versus $35,275 for females. The per capita income for the township was $27,305. About 1.3% of families and 1.9% of the population were below the poverty line, including 1.6% of those under age 18 and none of those age 65 or over.

== Government and politics ==
Presidential elections results
Year	Republican	Democratic
2020	47.8% 5,961	52.2% 6,498
2016	52.2% 5,022	47.8% 4,595
2012	52.2% 4,784	46.6% 4,277
2008	46.8% 4,245	52.2% 4,734
2004	53.4% 4,359	46.1% 3,764
2000	52.7% 2,860	44.8% 2,432
1996	46.4% 1,548	39.0% 1,301
1992	43.4% 1,301	31.0% 929

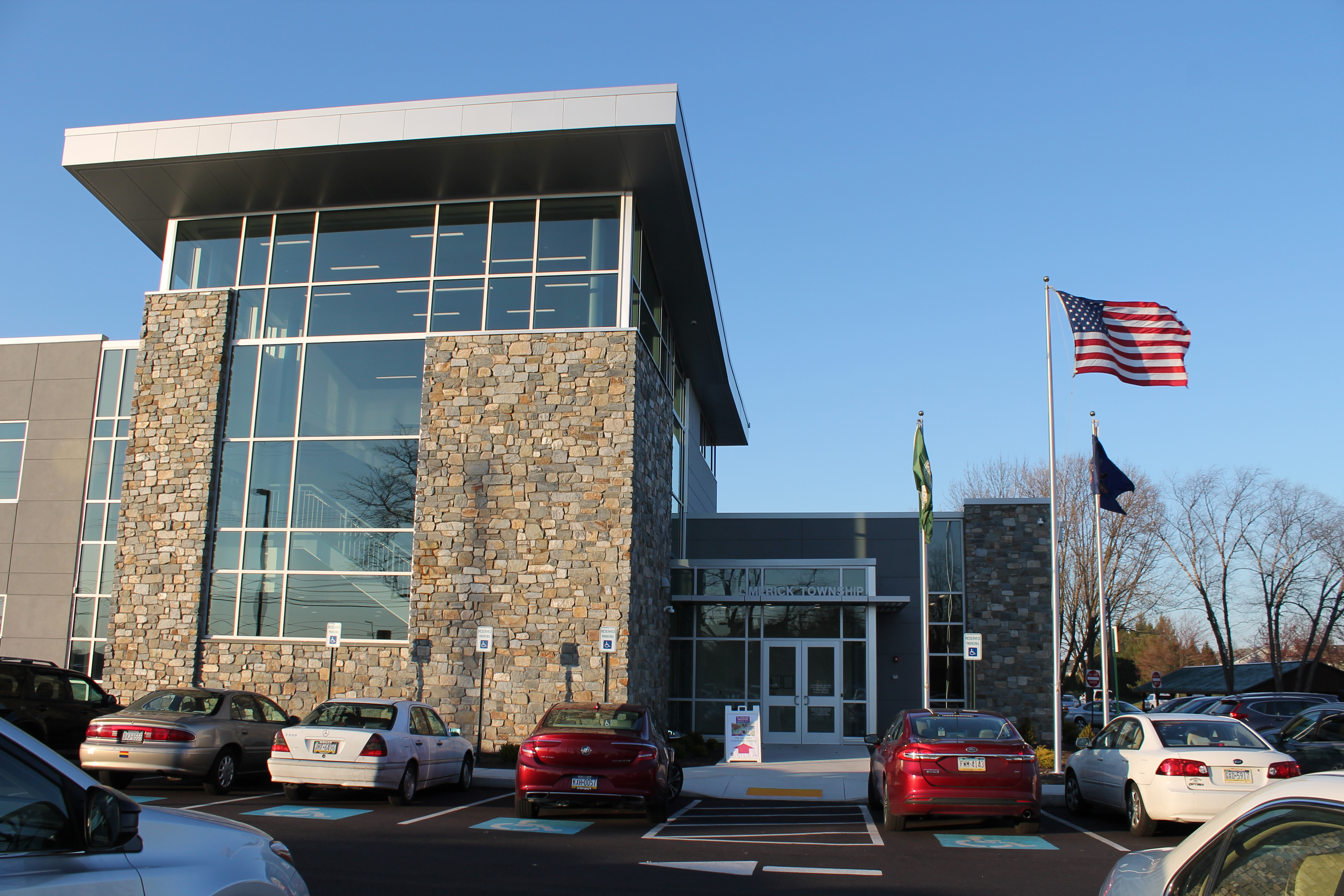
Limerick Township Building

=== Supervisors ===
- Connie Lawson (Chair)
- Cheryl N Walraven (Vice Chair)
- Patrick M. Morroney
- Kara Shuler
- Linda Irwin

https://www.limerickpa.org/202/Board-of-Supervisors

=== Legislators ===
- US Representative Madeleine Dean, 4th district, Democratic
- State Senator Tracy Pennycuick, 24th district, Republican
- State Representative Joe Ciresi, 146th district, Democratic

== Shopping ==
Several shopping centers are located within Limerick Township, including Philadelphia Premium Outlets, which opened in 2007.

== Infrastructure ==
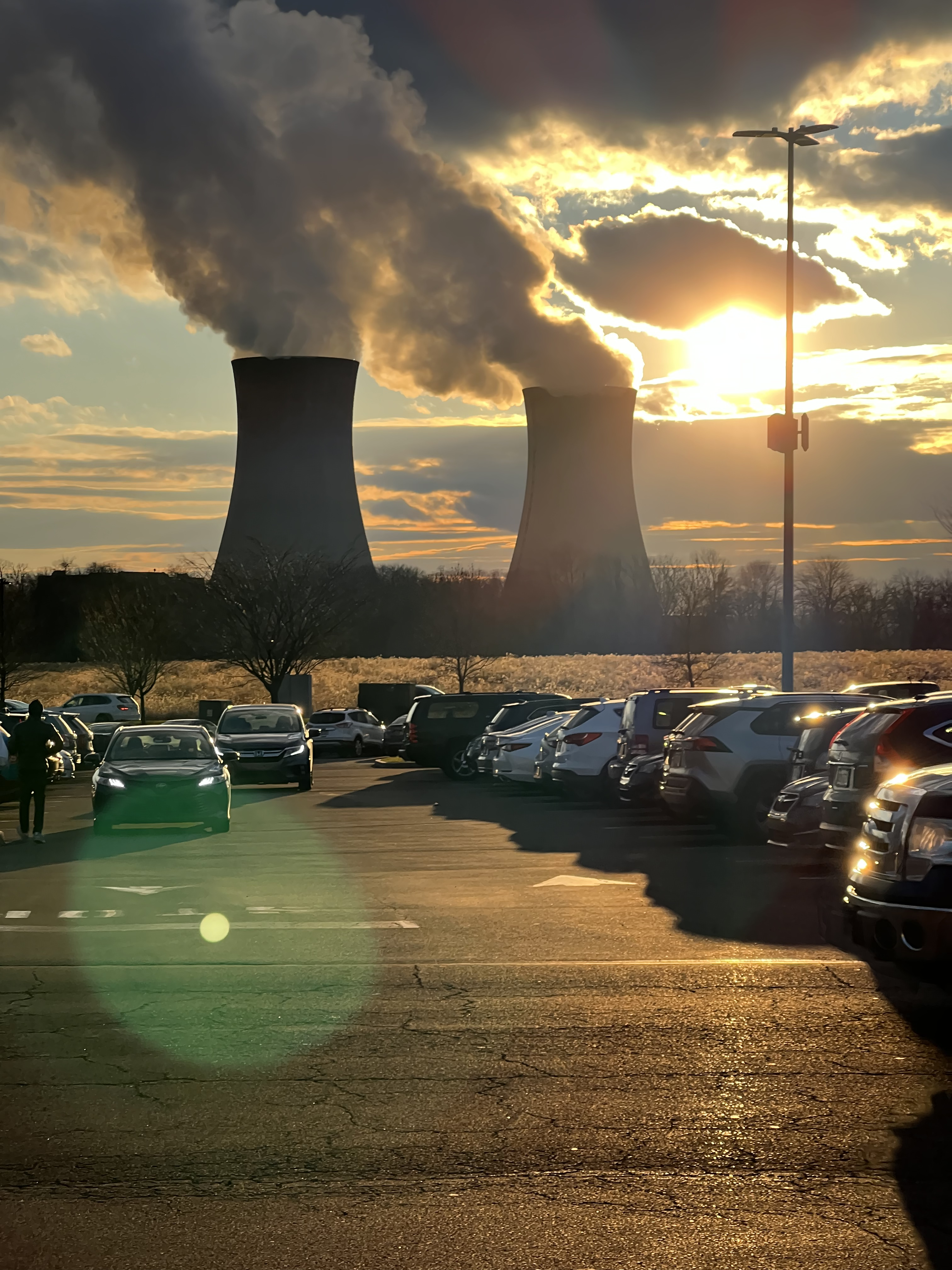
Limerick Generating Station viewed from the Philadelphia Premium Outlets

Limerick Generating Station, a nuclear power plant, is located in the township along the banks of the Schuylkill River. The plant opened in 1974, and provides electricity to Limerick Township and surrounding communities.

Heritage Field, a single-runway public use airport, is located in the township.

== Transportation ==
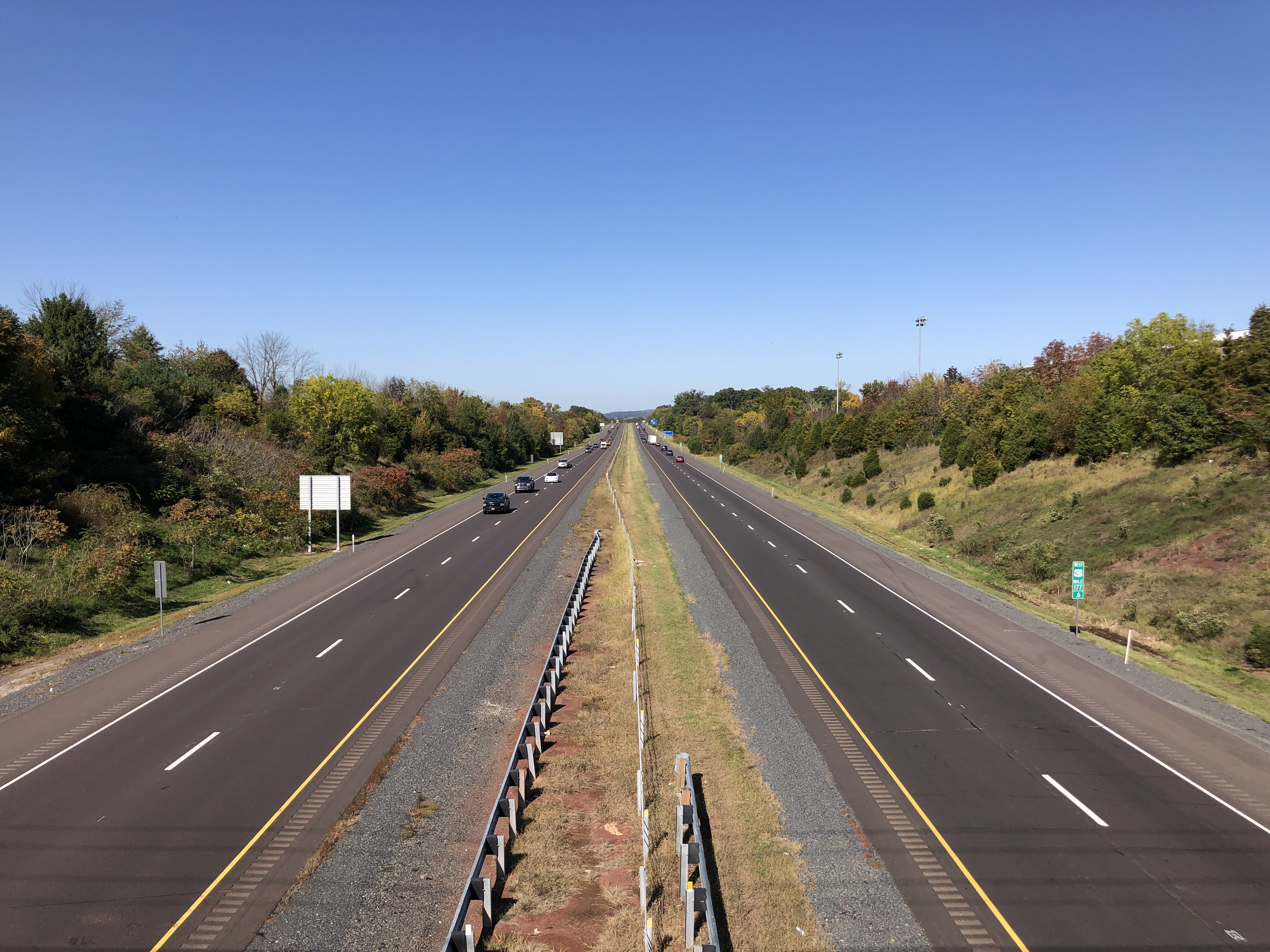
US 422 westbound in Limerick Township

As of 2022, there were 120.30 miles (193.60 km) of public roads in Limerick Township, of which 34.14 miles (54.94 km) were maintained by the Pennsylvania Department of Transportation (PennDOT) and 86.16 miles (138.66 km) were maintained by the township.

U.S. Route 422 is the main highway serving Limerick Township. It follows the Pottstown Expressway along a northwest–southeast alignment across the southwestern portion of the township, with three interchanges providing local access. Ridge Pike, the former alignment of US 422, runs parallel to the expressway to the northeast, providing access to local businesses and residences within the township.

SEPTA provides Suburban Bus service to Limerick Township along Route 93, which runs between the Norristown Transportation Center in Norristown and Pottstown and serves the Philadelphia Premium Outlets in the township, and Route 139, which runs between the King of Prussia Transit Center at the King of Prussia Mall and Limerick. Pottstown Area Rapid Transit (PART) provides bus service to the Philadelphia Premium Outlets along the Blue Line route, which heads west to Pottstown.

== Notable people ==
- Bob Shoudt (also known as "Notorious B.O.B."), a competitive eater holding numerous world records, including eating 59.6 lbs of food and drink in four hours at the Reading Phillies' "Gluttony Night" on June 12, 2018.

== Sister cities ==
- (Republic of Ireland) Limerick, Ireland
