= Schuylkill River National and State Heritage Area =

United States National Heritage Area in Pennsylvania

Coordinates: 40°20′N 75°44′W

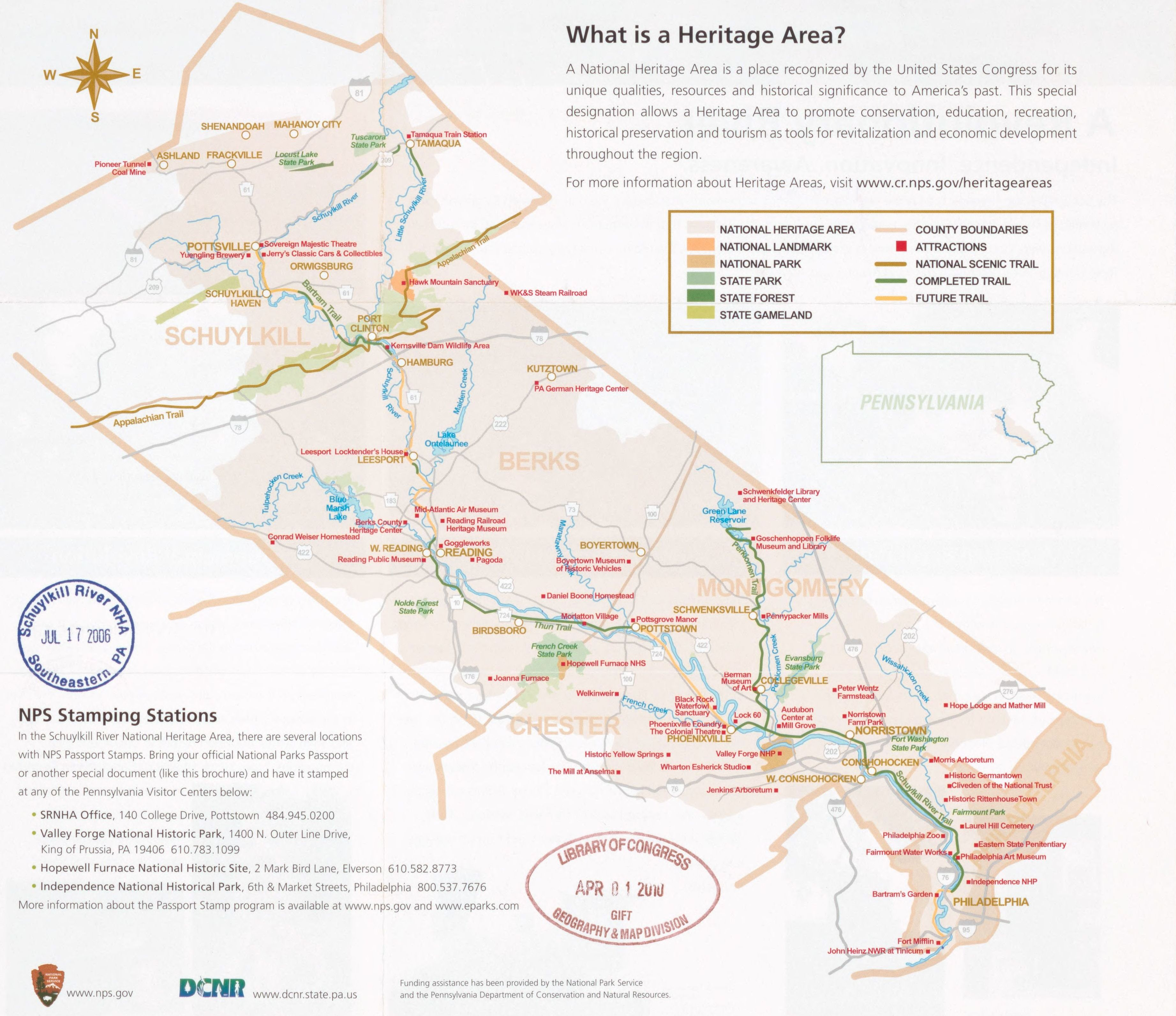
National Park Service map of the heritage area

Schuylkill River National and State Heritage Area is a federally designated National Heritage Area in the valley of the Schuylkill River in southeastern Pennsylvania. The heritage area extends from Pottsville to Philadelphia through Schuylkill, Berks, Chester, Montgomery and Philadelphia counties. The national heritage area interprets and promotes the river's history during the American Revolution and the Industrial Revolution, as well as its natural environment and its recreational use.

Major historic sites within the national heritage area include Valley Forge National Historical Park, Independence National Historical Park, Hopewell Furnace National Historic Site and Cliveden. Natural areas within the heritage area include Hawk Mountain Sanctuary and John Heinz National Wildlife Refuge.

The heritage area is managed by the Schuylkill River Greenway Association. It was established by Public Law 106-278 in 2000.
