= Michael Hillegas =

American politician (1729–1804)

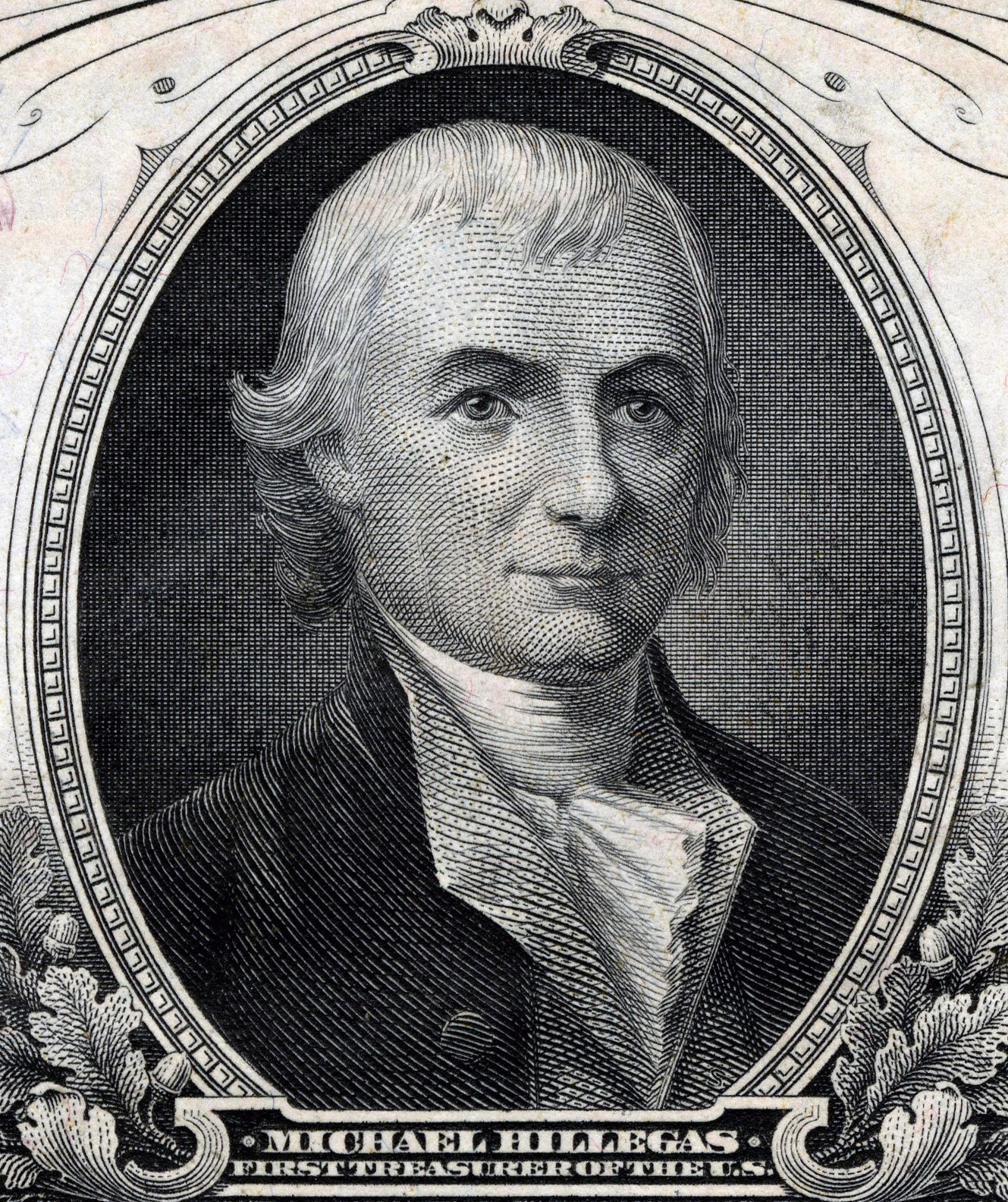

1st Treasurer of the United States
- In office July 29, 1775 – September 11, 1789
- Preceded by: Position established
- Succeeded by: Samuel Meredith

Personal details
- Born: April 22, 1729 Philadelphia, Province of Pennsylvania, British America
- Died: September 29, 1804 (aged 75) Philadelphia, Pennsylvania, U.S.
- Spouse: Henrietta Boude
- Profession: Merchant
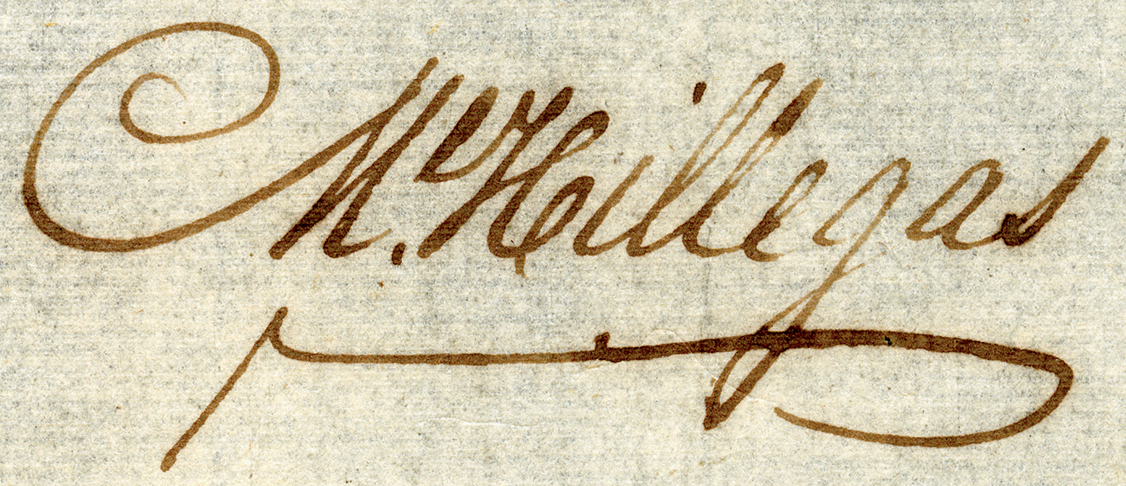
- Signature
- Portrait engraved by GFC Smillie (artwork by A.M. Archambault).

Michael Hillegas (April 22, 1729 – September 29, 1804) was an American merchant and politician who served as the first Treasurer of the United States from 1775 to 1789.

== Early life ==
Hillegas was born in Philadelphia, Pennsylvania, to Margaret Schiebenstock (1710–1770) and George Michael Hillegass (1696–1749), a prosperous merchant involved in the iron and sugar trades who had immigrated from Germany. On May 10, 1753, Hillegas married Henrietta Boude at Christ Church in Philadelphia; the couple had several children.

== Political career ==
Hillegas served as a member of the Pennsylvania Provincial Assembly from 1765 to 1775. In 1774, he was appointed treasurer of the Committee of Safety under Benjamin Franklin.

=== Treasurer of the United States ===
On July 29, 1775, the Continental Congress appointed Hillegas and George Clymer as joint Treasurers of the United Colonies. After Clymer resigned on August 6, 1776, Hillegas assumed sole responsibility for the office. He served throughout the American Revolutionary War, reportedly using much of his personal fortune to support the war effort. His son, Samuel Hillegas, was also authorized to sign the new Continental currency.

On September 9, 1776, the Continental Congress officially changed the nation's name to the United States of America, though Hillegas's title was not updated to "Treasurer of the United States" until March 1778. He also served briefly as a quartermaster to the army and on various congressional commissions.

Hillegas resigned on September 11, 1789, the same day Congress created the Treasury Department and Alexander Hamilton took office as the first Secretary of the Treasury. Samuel Meredith succeeded him as Treasurer.

== Later life and legacy ==
Hillegas was an early member of the American Philosophical Society, alongside Franklin. He died in Philadelphia on September 29, 1804, and is buried at Christ Church Burial Ground, near Franklin's grave.

In the late 19th century, his descendants petitioned to have his portrait appear on United States currency. His image subsequently appeared on the ten-dollar gold certificate in the series issued in 1907 and 1922.

== Gallery ==
Coat of arms of Michael Hillegas

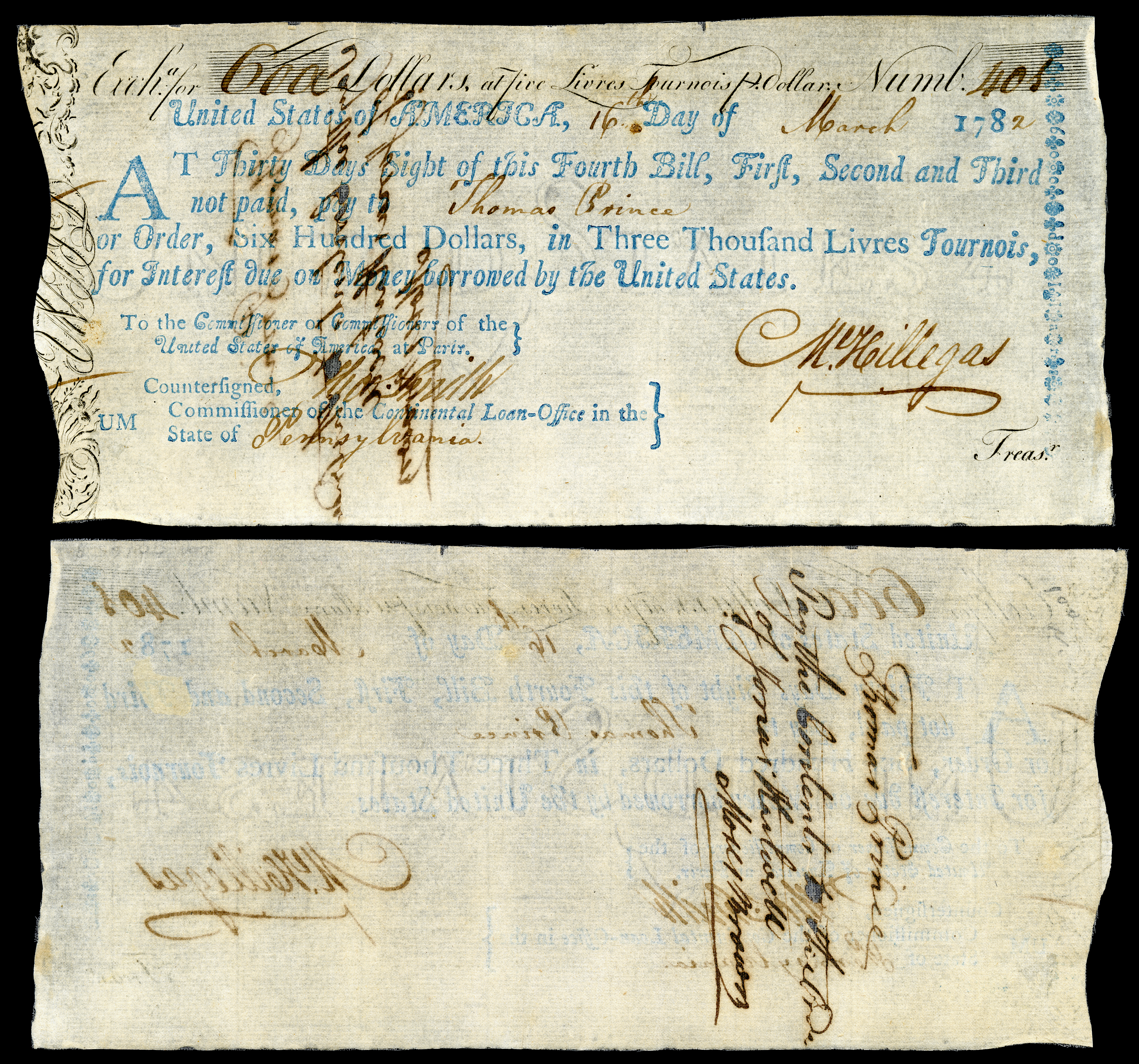
Check signed by Hillegas as Treasurer of the United States (1782)

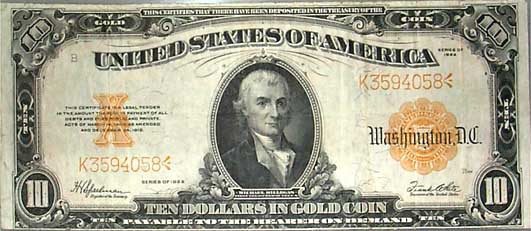
1922 $10 gold certificate featuring Hillegas's portrait

== See also ==
- United States Department of the Treasury
- River Bend Farm
