= Limerick Generating Station =

Nuclear power plant in Montgomery County, Pennsylvania, US

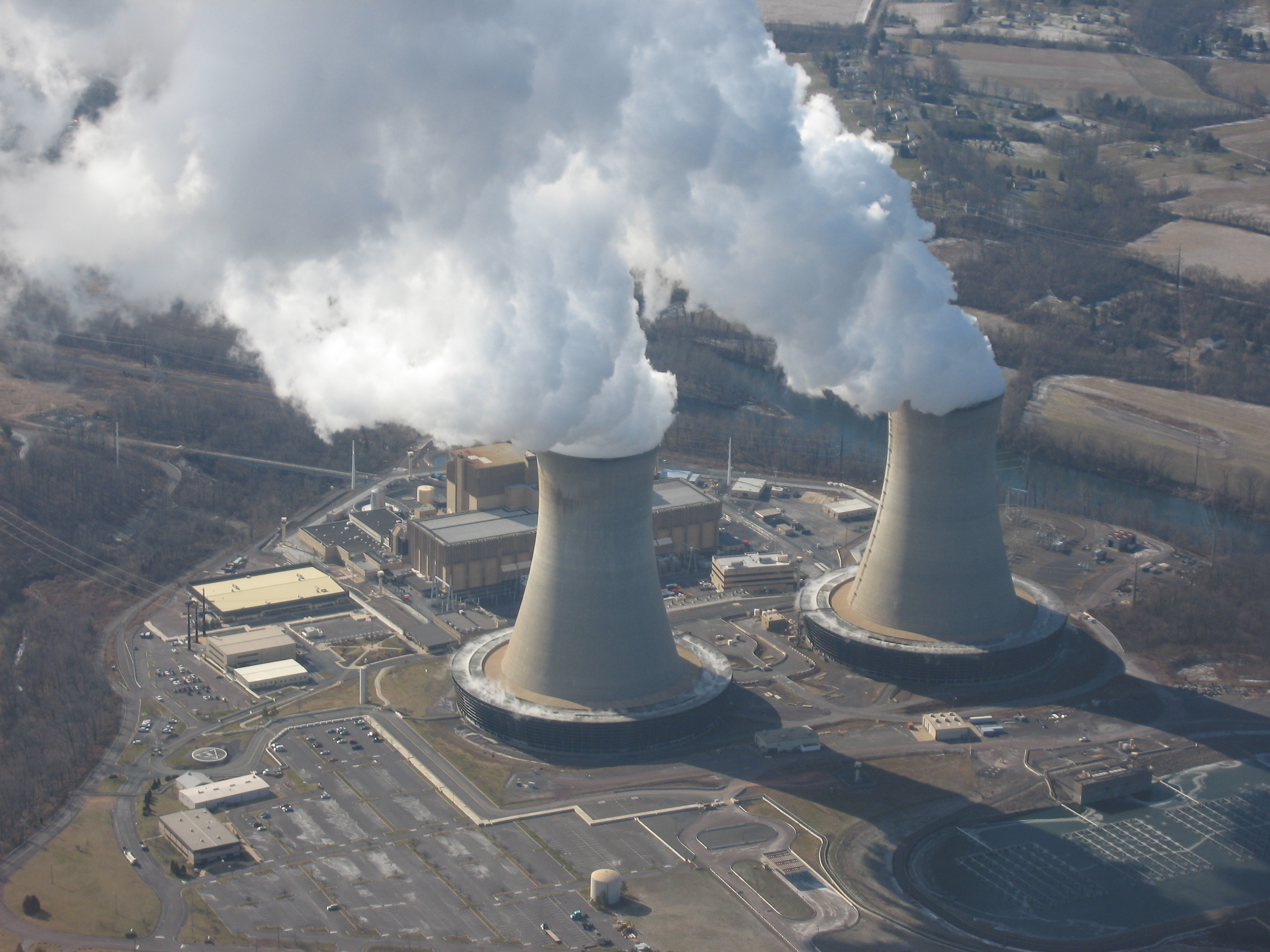
- NRC image of Limerick Generating Station, Units 1 & 2.
- Official name: Limerick Clean Energy Center
- Country: United States
- Location: Limerick Township, Montgomery County, Pennsylvania
- Coordinates: 40°13′36″N 75°35′14″W
- Status: Operational
- Construction began: June 19, 1974
- Commission date: Unit 1: February 1, 1986; Unit 2: January 8, 1990
- Construction cost: $7.246 billion (2007 USD, Unit 1 only)
- Owner: Constellation Energy
- Operator: Constellation Energy

Nuclear power station
- Reactor type: BWR
- Reactor supplier: General Electric
- Cooling towers: 2 × Natural Draft
- Cooling source: Schuylkill River
- Thermal capacity: 2 × 3515 MW_{th}

Power generation
- Units operational: 1 × 1130 MW; 1 × 1134 MW
- Make and model: BWR-4 (Mark II Containment)
- Nameplate capacity: 2264 MW
- Capacity factor: 93.77% (2017); 90.85% (lifetime)
- Annual net output: 19,309 GWh (2021)

External links
- Website: Limerick Generating Station
- Commons: Related media on Commons

The Limerick Generating Station, branded as the Limerick Clean Energy Center (LCEC), is a nuclear power plant located next to the Schuylkill River in Limerick Township, Montgomery County, Pennsylvania, approximately 29 miles (47 km) northwest of Center City, Philadelphia. The facility has two General Electric boiling water reactor (BWR) units, cooled by natural draft cooling towers. According to its owner, Constellation Energy, the two units are capable of producing 2,317 megawatts of power, which combined would provide electricity to around 2 million households. Constellation owns and operates this facility following their separation from Exelon Corporation in 2022. With the exception of refueling outages, Limerick Generating Station continuously operates at 100% power. The plant is connected to the grid, and transmits power via 220 kV (Unit 1) and 500 kV (Unit 2) transmission lines.

Limerick is a black start plant, meaning it does not require grid power for stator excitation. For critical standby power, Limerick depends on eight Fairbanks Morse 38 8-1/8 diesel engine generator sets that each deliver 3000 kilowatts of power and are capable of achieving rated speed within ten seconds of start.

The cooling towers for the Limerick Generating Station can be seen for miles away in parts of Montgomery, Chester, and Berks counties, and can be seen from the top of the tallest buildings in Philadelphia, including the One Liberty Observation Deck at Liberty Place.

== History ==
=== 20th century ===
Limerick's cooling towers seen from the Philadelphia Premium Outlets

In 1969, the Philadelphia Electric Company (now PECO Energy, a subsidiary of Exelon) announced plans to build a nuclear power plant on a site along the Schuylkill River in Limerick Township, Montgomery County, approximately 30 miles northwest of Center City Philadelphia. Community protests by the Keystone Alliance and other delays pushed the start of construction by the Bechtel Power Corporation to June 1974.

Limerick Unit 1 first attained criticality (began producing nuclear power, at limited capacity) on December 22, 1984, and was certified for commercial operation on February 1, 1986.

Limerick Unit 2 attained criticality on August 1, 1989, and commercial operation began on January 8, 1990.

On July 27, 1994, an F3 tornado struck the area surrounding the Limerick Generating Station. The tornado narrowly missed the station by two miles, but caused considerable damage to a nearby housing development in Limerick Township.

=== 21st century ===
President George W. Bush visited the Limerick Generating Station in May 2006 to discuss nuclear power and its role in the Advanced Energy Initiative, which he announced at the 2006 State of the Union Address. He toured the facility, including a trip to the control room of the plant.

On October 20, 2014, the Nuclear Regulatory Commission (NRC) granted extensions for Limerick Units 1 and 2 for another 20 years. The units are now licensed to operate until 2044 and 2049 respectively.

Unit 2 of the station was scrammed from 100% power to a shutdown on June 1, 2016, at 9 am. The reactor was shut down due to an electrical fault, causing the recirculation pumps to stop. The steam bypass valves that lead to the main condenser were opened and Limerick went through a normal hot shutdown process.

== Electricity production ==
Generation (MWh) of Limerick Generation Station
Year	Jan	Feb	Mar	Apr	May	Jun	Jul	Aug	Sep	Oct	Nov	Dec	Annual (Total)
2001	1,720,999	1,421,555	1,571,281	1,146,121	1,714,981	1,585,203	1,707,221	1,694,826	1,654,876	1,735,777	1,680,970	1,742,643	19,376,453
2002	1,723,068	1,482,757	1,142,347	1,668,793	1,554,140	1,646,067	1,567,800	1,691,587	1,639,388	1,735,382	1,691,178	1,753,837	19,296,344
2003	1,753,254	1,550,234	1,130,516	1,519,321	1,714,769	1,653,453	1,696,881	1,607,028	1,624,447	1,731,500	1,674,951	1,743,910	19,400,264
2004	1,722,720	1,537,566	1,168,932	1,668,300	1,671,600	1,556,407	1,683,613	1,685,008	1,567,029	1,709,787	1,660,675	1,717,900	19,349,537
2005	1,716,885	1,362,085	1,004,085	1,664,188	1,677,581	1,626,264	1,608,325	1,669,489	1,609,470	1,555,876	1,667,420	1,744,182	18,905,850
2006	1,667,901	1,430,630	1,140,055	1,661,763	1,592,421	1,619,325	1,668,413	1,673,366	1,629,221	1,718,027	1,665,166	1,730,896	19,197,184
2007	1,730,497	1,556,952	1,096,433	1,316,275	1,684,085	1,628,014	1,675,750	1,634,390	1,625,974	1,697,270	1,674,801	1,733,093	19,053,534
2008	1,709,982	1,188,953	1,065,283	1,649,544	1,744,775	1,619,733	1,667,984	1,681,787	1,609,184	1,702,975	1,673,330	1,733,732	19,047,262
2009	1,731,717	1,531,939	1,396,490	1,282,135	1,692,512	1,630,879	1,678,051	1,666,118	1,607,336	1,711,319	1,666,889	1,735,461	19,330,846
2010	1,717,455	1,540,997	1,329,570	1,268,375	1,680,777	1,460,188	1,635,055	1,659,289	1,584,617	1,673,967	1,666,693	1,709,091	18,926,074
2011	1,716,769	1,440,129	1,427,642	957,152	1,596,256	1,481,722	1,667,199	1,689,269	1,626,067	1,729,101	1,684,638	1,446,559	18,462,503
2012	1,743,758	1,328,701	1,071,712	1,611,667	1,405,686	1,522,218	1,314,452	1,674,950	1,475,259	1,672,235	1,633,409	1,701,569	18,155,616
2013	1,751,458	1,576,669	1,522,770	1,127,577	1,704,240	1,648,213	1,680,800	1,701,413	1,651,900	1,730,161	1,698,595	1,748,269	19,542,065
2014	1,761,978	1,584,692	987,324	1,183,600	1,695,842	1,651,260	1,697,166	1,703,843	1,624,208	1,731,219	1,699,199	1,756,913	19,077,244
2015	1,751,913	1,461,440	1,622,446	1,091,120	1,437,584	1,645,722	1,689,443	1,695,036	1,628,634	1,723,941	1,686,885	1,497,213	18,931,377
2016	1,753,510	1,607,138	1,352,635	1,213,874	1,709,628	1,582,149	1,684,955	1,680,157	1,643,223	1,727,511	1,689,950	1,750,645	19,395,375
2017	1,741,930	1,558,680	1,672,939	1,197,273	956,769	1,649,145	1,676,523	1,594,619	1,651,728	1,409,430	1,693,432	1,750,489	18,552,957
2018	1,737,890	1,517,844	1,465,309	1,151,564	1,691,798	1,617,941	1,694,980	1,680,943	1,640,875	1,730,111	1,699,359	1,710,012	19,338,626
2019	1,754,824	1,570,155	1,675,109	1,153,115	1,511,770	1,511,990	1,690,451	1,699,453	1,625,116	1,728,335	1,686,400	1,738,876	19,345,594
2020	1,718,927	1,529,354	1,444,047	1,318,997	1,728,841	1,637,515	1,687,857	1,693,885	1,614,751	1,730,909	1,541,707	1,697,974	19,344,764
2021	1,748,069	1,559,537	1,540,707	1,357,962	1,263,678	1,643,516	1,691,105	1,690,225	1,646,667	1,720,568	1,696,074	1,751,220	19,309,328
2022	1,742,519	1,546,378	1,487,783	1,009,362	1,571,477	1,650,562	1,685,350	1,687,841	1,633,204	1,729,399	1,674,688	1,748,593	19,167,156
2023	1,737,403	1,539,868	1,478,157	1,447,736	1,171,119	1,641,193	1,673,235	1,688,894	1,644,281	1,717,282	1,685,930	1,668,977	19,094,075
2024	1,619,051	1,613,523	1,639,582	1,037,263	1,695,803	1,631,996	1,675,364	1,688,287	1,622,020	1,723,600	1,665,569	1,748,284	19,360,342
2025	1,754,494	1,569,604	1,680,196	1,437,345	1,223,250	1,633,866	1,668,755	1,692,680	1,641,094	1,715,945	1,684,180	1,752,867	19,454,276
2026	1,750,925	1,570,911	1,675,087	1,424,435	1,143,430	1,634,791	1,665,449	1,677,921					--

== Seismic risk ==
The Nuclear Regulatory Commission estimates the risk of an earthquake intense enough to cause core damage to every reactor in the U.S. According to the NRC study published in August 2010, Limerick's earthquake risk was calculated at 1 in 18,868. Following the Fukushima Daiichi nuclear disaster in 2011, government regulators announced the plant would undergo further evaluations for seismic activity risk.

A quarry is located nearby which occasionally does blasting; however, this is done with the consent of plant staff.

== Surrounding population ==
The Nuclear Regulatory Commission defines two emergency planning zones around nuclear power plants: a plume exposure pathway zone with a radius of 10 miles (16 km), concerned primarily with exposure to, and inhalation of, airborne radioactive contamination, and an ingestion pathway zone of about 50 miles (80 km), concerned primarily with ingestion of food and liquid contaminated by radioactivity.

On the first Monday of the month, a 30-second-long test is run on sirens within a ten-mile radius of the plant. These monthly tests are low-volume "growls" compared to the high, undulating whine of the sirens in full use. On the first Monday of both June and December, the sirens are tested at their standard warning volume for three minutes.

The 2010 U.S. population within ten miles (16 km) of Limerick was 252,197, an increase of 18.7 percent in a decade, according to an analysis of U.S. Census data for msnbc.com. The 2010 U.S. population within 50 miles (80 km) was 8,027,924, an increase of 6.1 percent since 2000.

Cities within 50 miles:

- Pennsylvania
  - Philadelphia (28 mi/45 km)
  - Allentown (27 mi/43 km)
  - Reading (19 mi/31 km)
- New Jersey
  - Trenton (capital) (43 mi/69 km)
  - Camden (32 mi/52 km)
- Delaware
  - Wilmington (33 mi/53 km)

== See also ==
- Nuclear power
- Fricks Locks Historic District
- List of largest power stations in the United States
