= Harmonyville =

Harmonyville is the name of some places in the United States:

- Harmonyville, Pennsylvania
- Harmonyville, Vermont
