= Siousca, Pennsylvania =

Unincorporated community in Pennsylvania, US

- Unincorporated community
- Location within Pennsylvania
- Coordinates: 40°0′15″N 75°49′15″W
- Country: United States
- State: Pennsylvania
- County: Chester
- City/Townships: Coatesville, Valley Township, West Brandywine Township
- Elevation: 367 ft (112 m)
- Time zone: UTC-5 (Eastern (EST))
  - Summer (DST): UTC-4 (EDT)
- Area codes: 610 and 484
- GNIS feature ID: 1187725

Siousca is an unincorporated community in Chester County, Pennsylvania, United States. Siousca is located at the intersection of state routes 82 and 340, at the tripoint of the city of Coatesville and Valley and West Brandywine townships.
