= Suplee, Pennsylvania =

Unincorporated community in Pennsylvania, US

- Unincorporated community
- Location within Pennsylvania Location within the United States
- Coordinates: 40°05′58″N 75°52′45″W
- Country: United States
- State: Pennsylvania
- County: Chester
- Township: Honey Brook
- Elevation: 643 ft (196 m)
- Time zone: UTC-5 (Eastern (EST))
  - Summer (DST): UTC-4 (EDT)
- ZIP code: 19371
- Area codes: 610 and 484
- GNIS feature ID: 1204777

Suplee is an unincorporated community in Honey Brook Township in Chester County, Pennsylvania, United States. Suplee is located along Suplee Road, east of Honey Brook.
