= Brandamore, Pennsylvania =

Unincorporated community in Pennsylvania, US

- Unincorporated community
- Location within Pennsylvania Location within the United States
- Coordinates: 40°03′13″N 75°49′12″W
- Country: United States
- State: Pennsylvania
- County: Chester
- Township: West Brandywine
- Elevation: 617 ft (188 m)
- Time zone: UTC-5 (Eastern (EST))
  - Summer (DST): UTC-4 (EDT)
- ZIP code: 19316
- Area codes: 610 and 484
- GNIS feature ID: 1203138

Brandamore is an unincorporated community in West Brandywine Township in Chester County, Pennsylvania, United States. Brandamore is located at the intersection of Hibernia Road and Brandamore Road, north of Coatesville.
