= Cromby =

Cromby may refer to:

- Cromby, Pennsylvania, an unincorporated community in East Coventry Township, Chester County, Pennsylvania, United States
- Chris Cromby, member of Jemini, the UK duo for Eurovision
