= Icedale, Pennsylvania =

Unincorporated community in Pennsylvania, US

- Location of Icedale in Pennsylvania Icedale (the United States)
- Coordinates: 40°04′01″N 75°49′42″W
- Country: United States
- State: Pennsylvania
- County: Chester
- Township: West Brandywine
- Elevation: 590 ft (180 m)
- Time zone: UTC-5 (Eastern (EST))
  - Summer (DST): UTC-4 (EDT)
- ZIP codes: 19320
- Area code: 610
- FIPS code: 42-36672
- GNIS feature ID: 1203867

Icedale is a populated place situated in West Brandywine Township in Chester County, Pennsylvania, United States. It has an estimated elevation of 591 feet (180 m) above sea level.
