= Birchrunville, Pennsylvania =

Unincorporated community in Pennsylvania, US

- Unincorporated community
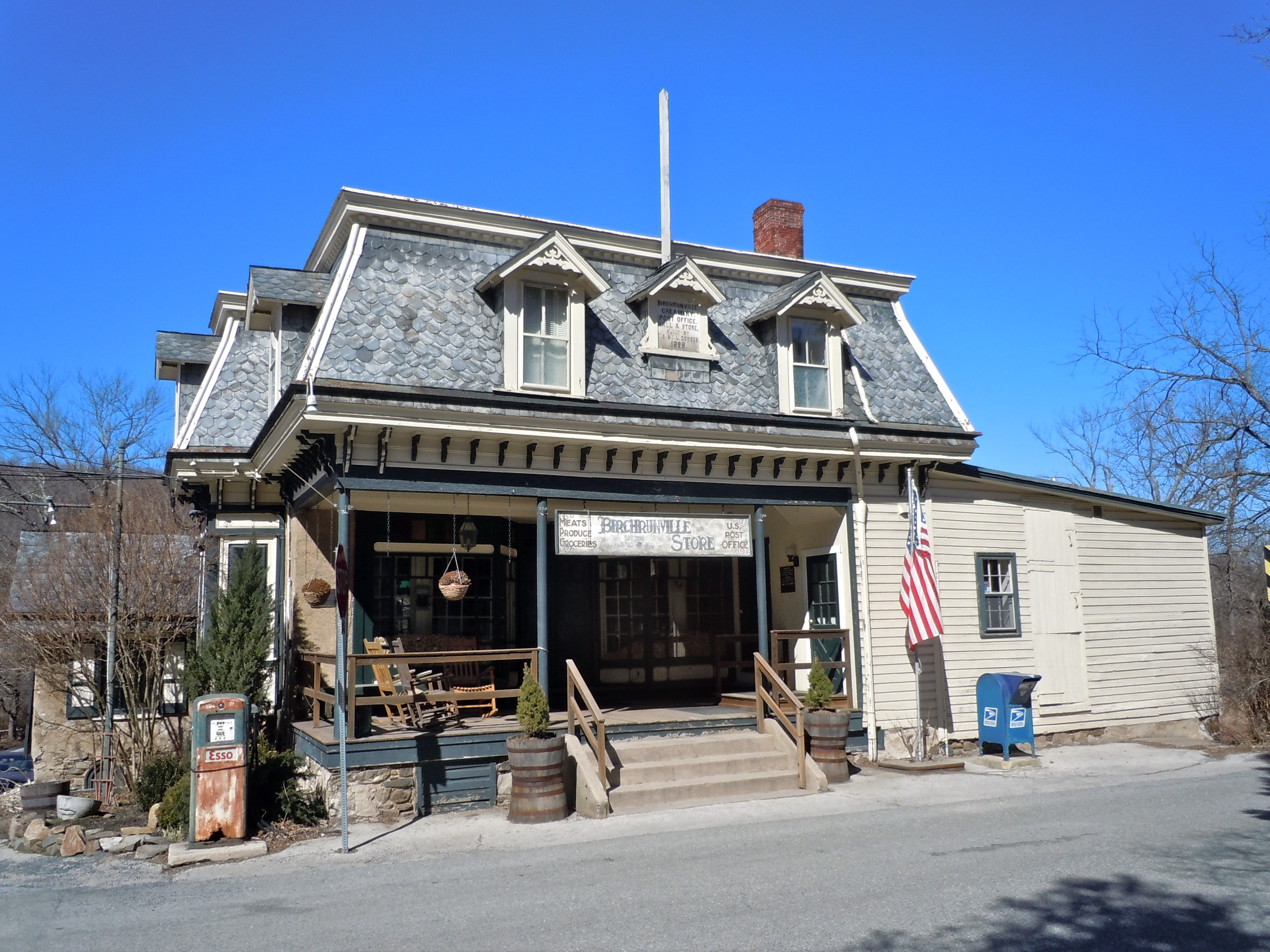
- Birchrunville General Store

- Location within the U.S. state of Pennsylvania Birchrunville (the United States)
- Coordinates: 40°7′46″N 75°38′17″W
- Country: United States
- State: Pennsylvania
- County: Chester
- Township: West Vincent
- Elevation: 397 ft (121 m)

Population (2000)
  - Total: 101
- Time zone: UTC-5 (Eastern (EST))
  - Summer (DST): UTC-4 (EDT)
- ZIP code: 19421
- Area codes: 610, 484 and 835
- GNIS feature ID: 1203099

Birchrunville is an unincorporated community in West Vincent Township in northern Chester County, Pennsylvania, United States. It is approximately 40 miles (64 km) west of Philadelphia, near the Downingtown exit on the Pennsylvania Turnpike.

== Geography ==
According to the United States Census Bureau, ZIP Code 19421 has a total area of 1.2 km^{2} (0.5 mi^{2}), all land. The community's mean elevation is 397 feet.

== Demographics ==
Birchrunville is neither an incorporated area nor a census-designated place, all the data is for the ZIP code 19421. At the 2000 census there were 101 people, 38 households, and 34 families living in the community. The population density was 202 people per square mile (77/km^{2}). The racial makeup of the community was 99% White, 0% African American, 0% Native American, 0% Asian, 0% Pacific Islander, 0% from other races, and 1% from two or more races. Hispanic or Latino of any race were 1%.

There were 38 households, 23.7% had children under the age of 18 living with them, 81.6% were married couples living together, 5.3% had a female householder with no husband present, and 10.5% were non-families. None of these had someone living alone who was 65 or older. The average household size was 2.66 and the average family size was 2.71.

The age distribution was 18.8% under the age of 18, 66.3% from 18 to 64, and 14.9% 65 or older. The median age was 42.6 years. The population was 55.4% male and 44.6% female.

The median household income was $117,341 and the median family income was $117,341. Males had a median income of $84,284 versus $58,750 for females. The per capita income for the community was $45,925. No people in the community were below the poverty line.

== Arts and culture ==
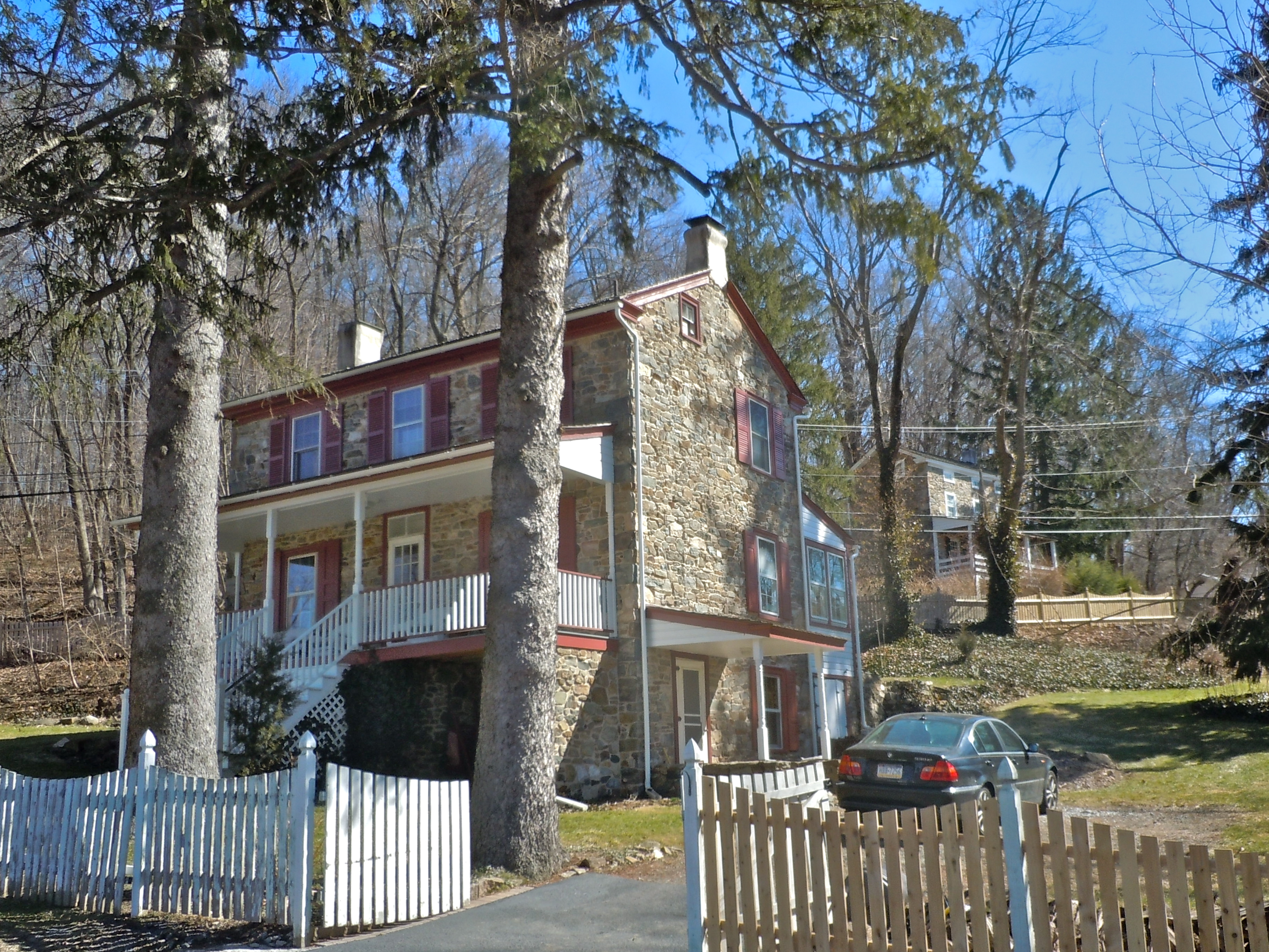
House in Birchrunville

=== Local landmarks ===
Birchrunville contains the Birchrunville Store Cafe, which currently houses a 40-seat restaurant. The building was built in 1898, and added to the National Register of Historic Places in 1978.

Remains of a mill stand on Powder Mill Hill.

=== Events ===
The village holds an annual 4th of July parade. It was started in 1976 by local resident Ben James. He organized the event and gathered "a dozen elementary-school-age boys living within half a mile of the post office." It was cancelled in 2007 for the first time due to public drunkenness and other problems.
