= New Garden Airport =

- IATA: none; ICAO: none; FAA LID: N57

Summary
- Airport type: Public
- Operator: New Garden Aviation, Inc.
- Location: Toughkenamon, PA
- Elevation AMSL: 435 ft / 133 m
- Coordinates: 39°49′50″N 075°46′11″W
- Website: newgardenflyingfield.com

Map
- Location of airport in Pennsylvania N57 (the United States)

Runways
Direction	Length		Surface
Direction	ft	m	Surface
6/24	3,693	1,126	Asphalt

New Garden Airport (FAA LID: N57), also known as New Garden Flying Field, is a public airport located in Toughkenamon, Chester County, Pennsylvania (about 20 miles (32 km) southwest of Philadelphia).

The airport serves a large general aviation community, and offers maintenance facilities, aviation fuel (100LL), flight instruction, aircraft rental and hangar/tie-down space. The airport also hosts the Brandywine Soaring Association and Chapter 240 of the Experimental Aircraft Association (EAA). Additionally, in 2015, the airport began hosting the annual Chester County Balloon Festival; a non-profit event with the proceeds going to the Chester County Hero Fund and several other local community groups. This hot air balloon festival is designed for families and kids of all ages featuring more than 20 balloons, including Special Shape Balloons. Jonathan Martin is the Aviation Director.

On August 31, 2022, the airport was the site of the New Garden Air & Car Show. The event was rescheduled from August 30, 2022, due to inclement weather.

== Facilities ==
New Garden Airport covers an area of 134 acres (54 ha) and contains one runway:

- Runway 6/24: 3,693 x 60 ft (1,126 x 18 m), Surface: Asphalt

== See also ==
- List of airports in Pennsylvania
