= Birchrunville Historic District =

Historic district in Pennsylvania, United States

- U.S. National Register of Historic Places
- U.S. Historic district
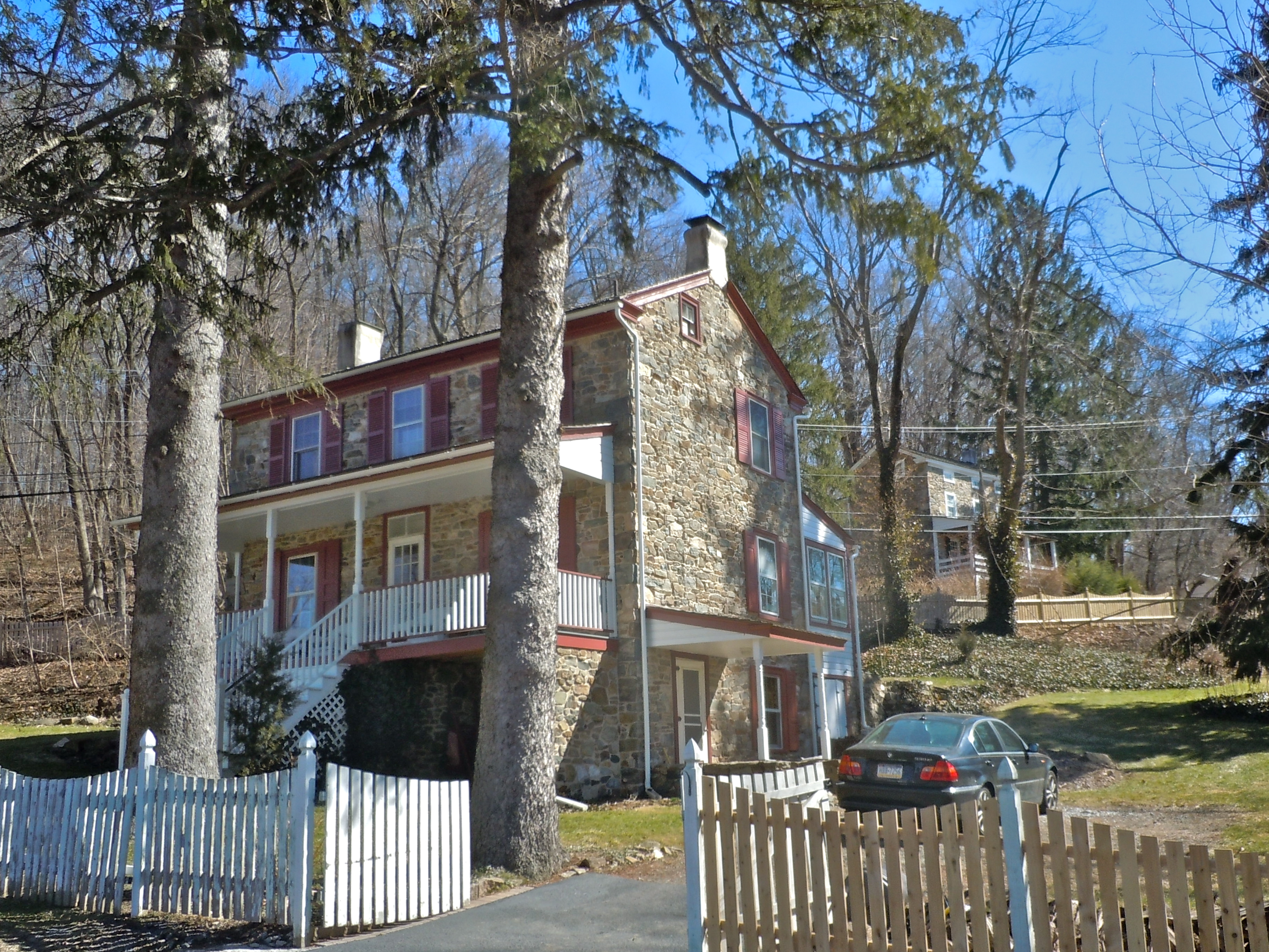
- McDermot House, Birchrunville Historic District, 1860, March 2011

- Location within Pennsylvania Location within the United States
- Location: Jct. of Flowing Springs Rd. and Schoolhouse Ln., near Birchrunville, West Vincent Township, Pennsylvania
- Coordinates: 40°07′56″N 75°38′19″W
- Area: 193.3 acres (78.2 ha)
- Architect: Multiple
- Architectural style: Mid 19th Century Revival, Late Victorian, Georgian
- NRHP reference No.: 92000401
- Added to NRHP: April 28, 1992

Birchrunville Historic District is a national historic district located in West Vincent Township, Chester County, Pennsylvania. The district includes 53 contributing buildings, 5 contributing sites, and 1 contributing structure in the crossroads hamlet of Birchrunville. The district is primarily residential, with those buildings largely constructed between 1840 and 1880. Some dwellings date to the early-19th century and are reflective of the Georgian style. The district also includes the separately listed Birchrunville General Store.

It was added to the National Register of Historic Places in 1992.
