= Honey Brook =

Honey Brook is both a borough and a township in Chester County, Pennsylvania.

- Honey Brook, Pennsylvania
- Honey Brook Township, Pennsylvania
