= Hiestand, Pennsylvania =

Unincorporated community in Pennsylvania, US

- Location in Pennsylvania Hiestand (the United States)
- Coordinates: 40°10′07″N 75°36′18″W
- Country: United States
- State: Pennsylvania
- County: Chester
- Township: East Vincent
- Elevation: 360 ft (110 m)
- Time zone: UTC-5 (Eastern (EST))
  - Summer (DST): UTC-4 (EDT)
- ZIP codes: 19475
- Area code: 610
- GNIS feature ID: 1203799

Hiestand is a populated place situated in East Vincent Township in Chester County, Pennsylvania, United States. It has an estimated elevation of 361 feet (110 m) above sea level. Hiestand is located at the intersection of Ellis Woods, Sheeder, and Ridge Roads.
