= Humphreyville, Pennsylvania =

Unincorporated community in Pennsylvania, US

- Location in Pennsylvania Humphreyville (the United States)
- Coordinates: 39°57′34″N 75°52′17″W
- Country: United States
- State: Pennsylvania
- County: Chester
- Township: East Fallowfield
- Elevation: 617 ft (188 m)
- Time zone: UTC-5 (Eastern (EST))
  - Summer (DST): UTC-4 (EDT)
- ZIP codes: 19320
- Area code: 610
- FIPS code: 42-36256
- GNIS feature ID: 1177590

Humphreyville is a populated place situated in East Fallowfield Township in Chester County, Pennsylvania, United States. It has an estimated elevation of 617 feet (188 m) above sea level.
