= St. Paul's Episcopal Church (Exton, Pennsylvania) =

Historic church in Pennsylvania, United States

- St. Paul's Church
- U.S. National Register of Historic Places
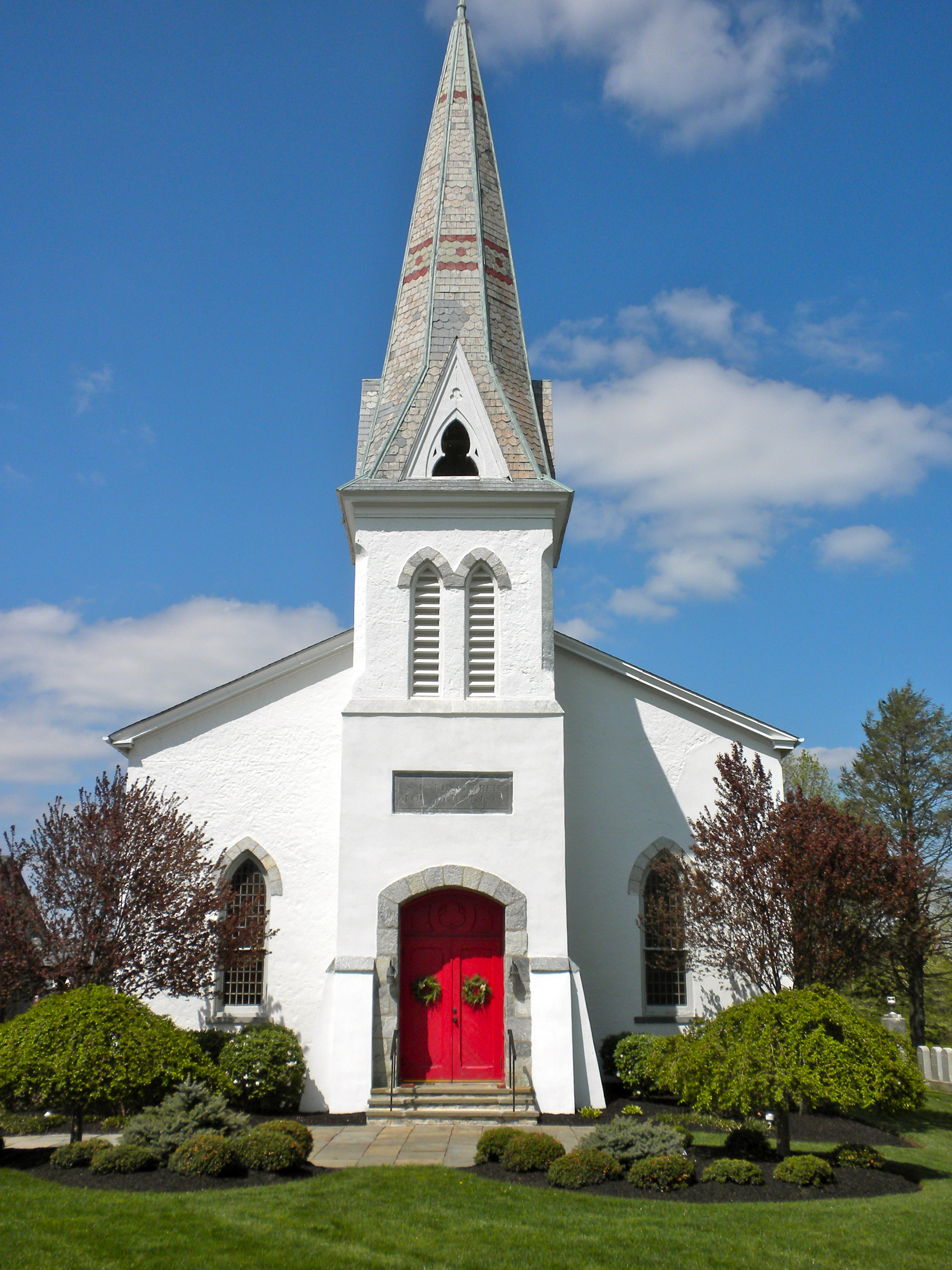

- Location within Pennsylvania
- Location: 1105 E. Lincoln Hwy, Exton, Pennsylvania
- Coordinates: 40°1′59″N 75°35′26″W
- Area: 2.5 acres (1.0 ha)
- Built: 1828
- Architectural style: Gothic Revival, Rural Gothic
- MPS: West Whiteland Township MRA
- NRHP reference No.: 84003304
- Added to NRHP: September 6, 1984

St. Paul's Episcopal Church, Exton, also known as St. Paul's Church, is a historic church at 1105 E. Lincoln Highway in Exton, Pennsylvania in Chester County, Pennsylvania, in the area known as the Great Valley. It was built in 1828 and added to the National Register of Historic Places in 1984 as St. Paul's Church. It is one of the 133 parish churches of the Episcopal Diocese of Pennsylvania. The church reported 550 members in 2019 and 417 members in 2023; no membership statistics were reported in 2024 parochial reports. Plate and pledge income reported for the congregation in 2024 was $255,554. Average Sunday attendance (ASA) in 2024 was 91 persons.

== History ==
Founded in 1828, St. Paul's is the second oldest religious congregation in West Whiteland Township in continual existence, following Grove Methodist Church. It was built along the Lancaster Pike, the first turnpike in the United States, and a major route to the west from Philadelphia. The church is historically linked to St. David's at Radnor, St. Peter's Church in the Great Valley and Christ Church, of Greenville, Delaware from the time when Episcopal churches in the area shared rectors.

The cornerstone laying ceremony in 1828 was of statewide significance, with John Andrew Shulze, the Governor of Pennsylvania, attending, as well as Bishop William White, Presiding Bishop of Pennsylvania, and of the Episcopal Church in the United States, and the Rev. Brinckle, rector of both St. Peter's and St. David's. The Great Valley was predominately Quaker in 1828, and about 75% of the founding members were of Quaker heritage. They may have changed religious membership because their participation in the United States military during or after the American Revolution violated Quaker pacifist beliefs. Or they may have left their Quaker roots because of the Separation of 1828 between Quaker Hicksite and Orthodox branches.

The Church Farm School was founded as a farm and industrial school for boys in 1918 by the Rev. Dr. Charles W. Shreiner about 300 yards west of the church. From 1921–1948 Shreiner served as rector of St. Paul's, as well as Headmaster of the Church Farm School.

== Architecture ==
St. Paul's was built in 1828-29 with major Gothic alterations added in 1872. It was built as a 44-foot x 60 foot one story structure with a plain gable roof. The pews formed around double aisles facing the pulpit at the south end between two doors which formed the main entrance. In 1872 the church was rebuilt keeping the same walls and roof. On the south façade a vestibule and spired bell tower were erected. The pulpit was moved to the north end and a 12’ X 17’ chancel with a triplet window was added there with two 12’ x 12’ rooms, a library and a robing room. New pews, which incorporated a pointed Gothic arch, faced north along a single central aisle. An organ gallery was added as well.

Most prominent is the Lychgate at the old entrance to the church. In colonial times through to the mid 1900s, the Lychgate was the place where the unclean would stop and wait until the priest arrived to bless them. In the Judeo–Christian tradition a dead body was considered unclean or unholy. So the pall bearers would carry the body to the Lychgate there priest would greet the pall bearers and mourners. It is under this Lychgate that the priest conducted the first part of the funeral service under its temporary shelter. Once the body was blessed, it could enter upon hallowed or blessed ground. Generally, the ground outside a church is not considered sacred. But, when the church in constructed in or next to a cemetery then the ground in and around the Church has been consecrated. So, it is with St. Paul's, immediately beyond the East wall is the 200-year-old cemetery. This combination circumstances demonstrates the significance of the Lychgate to not only the orthodox Christian but to the historical authenticity of church structure.

The Rectory was built in 1884 – 5. In 1928 the triplet window was replaced by a window designed by the D’Ascenzo Studios of Philadelphia, donated by the Rev. W. L. Bull.

== See also ==
- Dioceses of the Episcopal Church in the United States of America
- National Register of Historic Places listings in Chester County, Pennsylvania
