= Steelville, Pennsylvania =

Unincorporated community in Pennsylvania, US

Steelville is an unincorporated community in Chester County, Pennsylvania, United States. According to the 2016 census, the town has not been included in past census counts because the town is so small. It lies next to the Octoraro Creek: the border line between Lancaster County and Chester County.

== History ==
Steelville occupies land adjacent to Atglen which was formerly wilderness. Native Americans roamed the land during this time, and primarily used trails such as the Great Minquas Path to access trade routes and trade with the English settlers. In 1875, the borough of Atglen was established and now includes Steelville. The town is also a member of West Fallowfield Township that was developed in 1878.

A few organized religious groups began developing in the surrounding area, including the Presbyterians. Presbyterian churches and Quaker meeting houses began to form. A few families from these religious groups formed the town of Steelville, as the English began to settle most of what is now the East Coast, United States. One of these families was the family of William Steele, who settled in Steelville in 1750. He resided here in 1814, where he had a son, Franklin Steele.

== Geography ==
Steelville is located at 39.904827°N 75.993560°W (latitude, longitude). It is generally contained within the perimeter of Bailey's Crossroads Road, Schoff Road, and Steelville Road. The elevation in Steelville is 390 feet (120 m) above sea level.
