= Lower Hopewell, Pennsylvania =

Unincorporated community in Pennsylvania, US

- Unincorporated community
- Location within the state of Pennsylvania Lower Hopewell (the United States)
- Coordinates: 39°47′03″N 76°01′19″W
- Country: United States
- State: Pennsylvania
- County: Chester
- Township: Lower Oxford
- Elevation: 322 ft (98 m)
- Time zone: UTC-5 (Eastern (EST))
  - Summer (DST): UTC-4 (EDT)
- GNIS feature ID: 1204072

Lower Hopewell is an unincorporated community in Chester County, Pennsylvania, United States. It lies at an elevation of 322 feet (98 m). The community was part of the now-dissolved Borough of Hopewell.
