= Birchrunville General Store =

Historic place in Pennsylvania, United States

- U.S. National Register of Historic Places
- U.S. Historic district – Contributing property
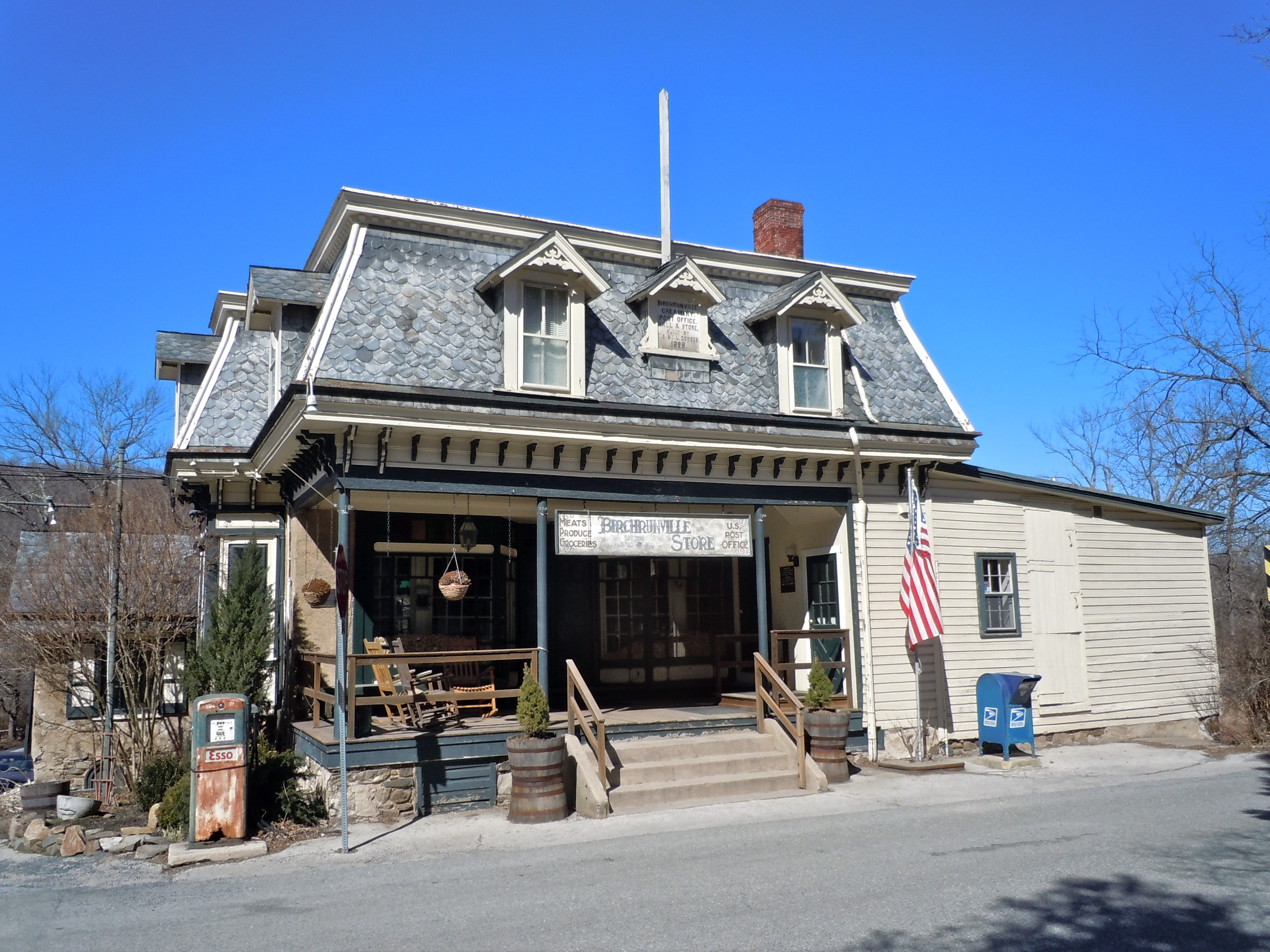
- Birchrunville General Store, March 2011

- Location within Pennsylvania Location within the United States
- Location: Hollow and Flowing Springs Roads, at Birchrunville, West Vincent Township, Pennsylvania
- Coordinates: 40°7′51″N 75°38′26″W
- Area: 0.3 acres (0.12 ha)
- Built: 1898
- Built by: Dewees, T.B. & I.L.
- Architectural style: Late Victorian
- NRHP reference No.: 78002368
- Added to NRHP: March 21, 1978

Birchrunville General Store is a historic general store located in West Vincent Township, Chester County, Pennsylvania. It was built in 1898, and is a two-story, stone and frame, banked structure in a Late Victorian style. It has a mansard roof with fishscale slate and a jutting, short wooden bay window. It was built to house a general store and post office, with a meeting hall above and creamery below.

It was added to the National Register of Historic Places in 1978. It is located in the Birchrunville Historic District and is the current location of the Birchrunville Store Cafe.
