= West Fallowfield Christian School =

School in Pennsylvania, United States

Coordinates: 39.92262°N 75.95020°W

Information
- Religious affiliation: Christianity
- Established: 1941; 85 years ago

West Fallowfield Christian School is a Christian school in Atglen, Chester County, Pennsylvania in the United States.

It was established in 1941 to partner with Christian families in educating and nurturing their children, giving them a strong academic and spiritual foundation from kindergarten through eighth grade.

The school has around 150 students, so the teachers can be closer to the students.

In Fall 2016, WFCS began offering "The Academy at West Fallowfield Christian School," a 9th Grade co-op.
