= Hayti, Pennsylvania =

Unincorporated community in Pennsylvania, US

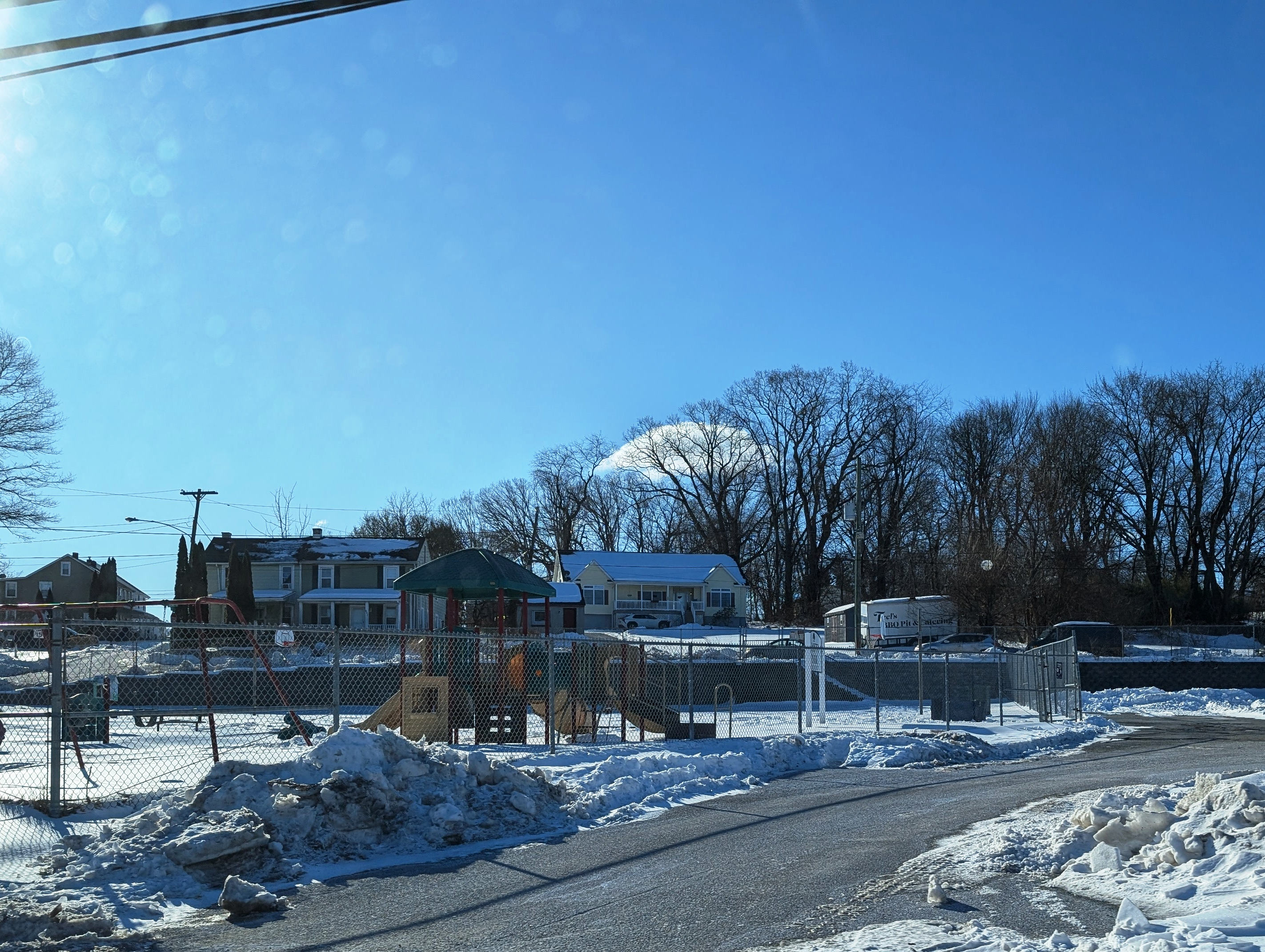

- Location in Chester County and the U.S. state of Pennsylvania

- Location of Hayti in Pennsylvania
- Coordinates: 39°58′58″N 75°50′29″W
- Country: United States
- State: Pennsylvania
- County: Chester

Area
  - Total: 1.40 sq mi (3.62 km^{2})
  - Land: 1.39 sq mi (3.61 km^{2})
  - Water: 0.0039 sq mi (0.01 km^{2})
- Elevation: 502 ft (153 m)

Population (2020)
  - Total: 2,890
  - Density: 2,071/sq mi (799.7/km^{2})
- Time zone: UTC-5 (Eastern (EST))
  - Summer (DST): UTC-4 (EDT)
- ZIP code: 19320
- Area codes: 610 and 484
- FIPS code: 42-33328
- GNIS feature ID: 1176706

Hayti is a census designated place and unincorporated community situated in Valley Township in Chester County, Pennsylvania, United States. The CDP was first designated as such in 2020. As of 2020, it has a population of 2,890. Hayti has an estimated elevation of 502 feet (153 m) above sea level.

== Demographics ==
Historical population
Census	Pop.	Note	%±
2020	2,890		—
U.S. Decennial Census

== Education ==
The school district is Coatesville Area School District.
