= Hallman, Pennsylvania =

Unincorporated community in Pennsylvania, US

- Location in Pennsylvania Hallman (the United States)
- Coordinates: 40°06′44″N 75°35′31″W
- Country: United States
- State: Pennsylvania
- County: Chester
- Township: East Pikeland
- Elevation: 259 ft (79 m)
- Time zone: UTC-5 (Eastern (EST))
  - Summer (DST): UTC-4 (EDT)
- ZIP codes: 19442
- Area codes: 610, 484
- FIPS code: 42-32060
- GNIS feature ID: 1203742

Hallman is a populated place situated within East Pikeland Township in Chester County, Pennsylvania, United States. It has an estimated elevation of 259 feet (79 m) above sea level.
