= West Goshen, Pennsylvania =

Unincorporated community in Pennsylvania, US

- Former census-designated place
- Location of West Goshen in Pennsylvania West Goshen, Pennsylvania (the United States)
- Coordinates: 39°58′03″N 75°34′29″W
- Country: United States
- State: Pennsylvania
- County: Chester
- Township: West Goshen

Area
  - Total: 3.2 sq mi (8.3 km^{2})
  - Land: 3.2 sq mi (8.3 km^{2})
  - Water: 0.0 sq mi (0 km^{2})
- Elevation: 436 ft (133 m)

Population (2000)
  - Total: 8,472
  - Density: 2,600/sq mi (1,000/km^{2})
- Time zone: UTC-5 (EST)
  - Summer (DST): UTC-4 (EDT)
- Area code: 610

West Goshen was a census-designated place (CDP) in West Goshen Township, Chester County, Pennsylvania, United States. The population was 8,472 at the 2000 census. The CDP was not delineated for the 2010 census.

== Geography ==
West Goshen Township is located at 39°58′3″N 75°34′29″W (39.967408, -75.574679).

According to the U.S. Census Bureau, West Goshen had a total area of 3.2 square miles (8.3 km^{2}), all land.

== Demographics ==
At the 2000 census there were 8,472 people, 3,310 households, and 2,191 families living in the CDP. The population density was 2,663.7 inhabitants per square mile (1,028.5/km^{2}). There were 3,376 housing units at an average density of 1,061.5 per square mile (409.8/km^{2}). The racial makeup of the CDP was 87.75% White, 4.96% African American, 0.09% Native American, 5.61% Asian, 0.01% Pacific Islander, 0.76% from other races, and 0.83% from two or more races. Hispanic or Latino of any race were 2.28%.

There were 3,310 households, 30.5% had children under the age of 18 living with them, 55.9% were married couples living together, 7.3% had a female householder with no husband present, and 33.8% were non-families. 25.8% of households were made up of individuals, and 6.8% were one person aged 65 or older. The average household size was 2.50 and the average family size was 3.09.

The age distribution was 22.6% under the age of 18, 7.9% from 18 to 24, 32.6% from 25 to 44, 24.4% from 45 to 64, and 12.4% 65 or older. The median age was 37 years. For every 100 females, there were 100.7 males. For every 100 females age 18 and over, there were 97.4 males.

The median household income was $59,505 and the median family income was $71,573. Males had a median income of $44,773 versus $33,979 for females. The per capita income for the CDP was $27,912. About 1.5% of families and 4.1% of the population were below the poverty line, including 3.9% of those under age 18 and 3.1% of those age 65 or over.
