= Ironsides, Pennsylvania =

Unincorporated community in Pennsylvania, US

- Unincorporated community
- Location in Pennsylvania Ironsides (the United States)
- Coordinates: 40°08′02″N 75°32′28″W
- Country: United States
- State: Pennsylvania
- County: Chester
- Township: Schuylkill
- Elevation: 118 ft (36 m)
- Time zone: UTC-5 (Eastern (EST))
  - Summer (DST): UTC-4 (EDT)
- ZIP codes: 19442
- Area codes: 610, 484
- FIPS code: 42-37112
- GNIS feature ID: 1203876

Ironsides is a populated place located within the township of Schuylkill in Chester County, Pennsylvania, United States. It has an estimated elevation of 118 feet (36 m) above sea level.
