= Isabella, Chester County, Pennsylvania =

Unincorporated community in Pennsylvania, US

- Populated place
- Location in Pennsylvania Isabella (the United States)
- Coordinates: 40°07′15″N 75°50′17″W
- Country: United States
- State: Pennsylvania
- County: Chester
- Township: West Nantmeal
- Elevation: 646 ft (197 m)
- Time zone: UTC-5 (Eastern (EST))
  - Summer (DST): UTC-4 (EDT)
- ZIP codes: 19520
- Area code: 610
- FIPS code: 42-37212
- GNIS feature ID: 1203878

Isabella is a populated place situated in West Nantmeal Township in Chester County, Pennsylvania, United States. It has an estimated elevation of 646 feet (197 m) above sea level.

== History ==
The community took its name from the nearby Isabella Furnace.
