= Toughkenamon, Pennsylvania =

Unincorporated community in Pennsylvania, US

Toughkenamon
- Census-designated place
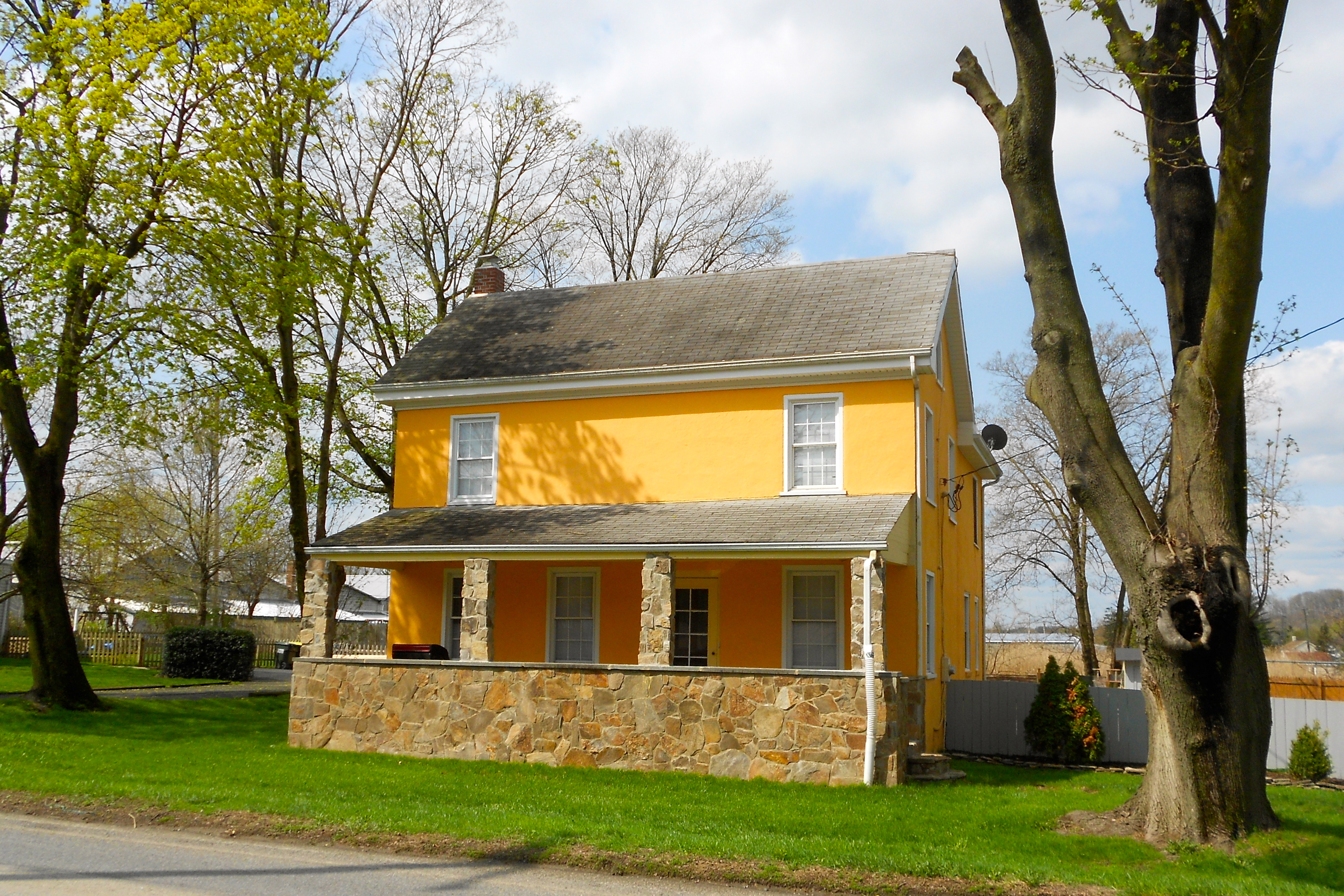
- House in Toughkenamon

- Location in Chester County and the U.S. state of Pennsylvania.
- Coordinates: 39°49′48″N 75°45′32″W
- Country: United States
- State: Pennsylvania
- County: Chester
- Township: New Garden

Area
  - Total: 2.1 sq mi (5.4 km^{2})
  - Land: 2.1 sq mi (5.4 km^{2})
  - Water: 0.0 sq mi (0 km^{2})
- Elevation: 338 ft (103 m)

Population (2010)
  - Total: 1,492
  - Density: 710/sq mi (270/km^{2})
- Time zone: UTC-5 (EST)
  - Summer (DST): UTC-4 (EDT)
- ZIP code: 19374
- Area codes: 610 and 484

Toughkenamon is a census-designated place (CDP) in New Garden Township, Pennsylvania, United States. The population was 1,492 at the 2010 census.

== History ==
The area known as Toughkenamon was originally inhabited by Lenape Native Americans who spoke Unami. In the original survey, in 1700, the surveyor notes that he crossed the Dochcanamon Hill. Other forms of spelling this name were used, such as Tokenamon, Taukenamon, Taughlikenemon.

Thomas and Mary Rowland settled in the valley, near the present village of Toughkenamon, in 1706, being perhaps the first settlers who purchased lands in New Garden Township. They came to the township from old Ashton Township, old Chester County, now in Delaware County.

Toughkenamon has been of significant importance in the development of the United States. First, the characteristics of the interactions between settlers and Lenapes was a microcosm of the conflicts that would occur in the future. For example, the farmers dug trenches around their crops, and filled them with water, to prevent reoccurrence of the conflagration that occurred when local Lenapes started a burn. The fact that the original Toughkenamon settlers maintained water-filled trenches is evidence that they had dialogue and an understanding of the importance of the burn. The traditional burn was an ancient way to increase yields of local grains and tubers, and increase the deer population. But later settlers no longer interacted with the departed tribe, so falsely assumed the burns had been solely aimed at destroying their ancestors' crops, adding to mistrust of remaining Native-American families in nearby counties.

Toughkenamon Hill has been quarried for centuries.

In later centuries Toughkenamon was considered a village. It was an early industrial center due to its strategic location on the old Baltimore Pike between Philadelphia and Washington, D.C., easy access to raw materials such as wood, water and ore. Even today, businesses critical to national wholesale distribution of perishable foods are located in and near Toughkenamon.

== Geography ==
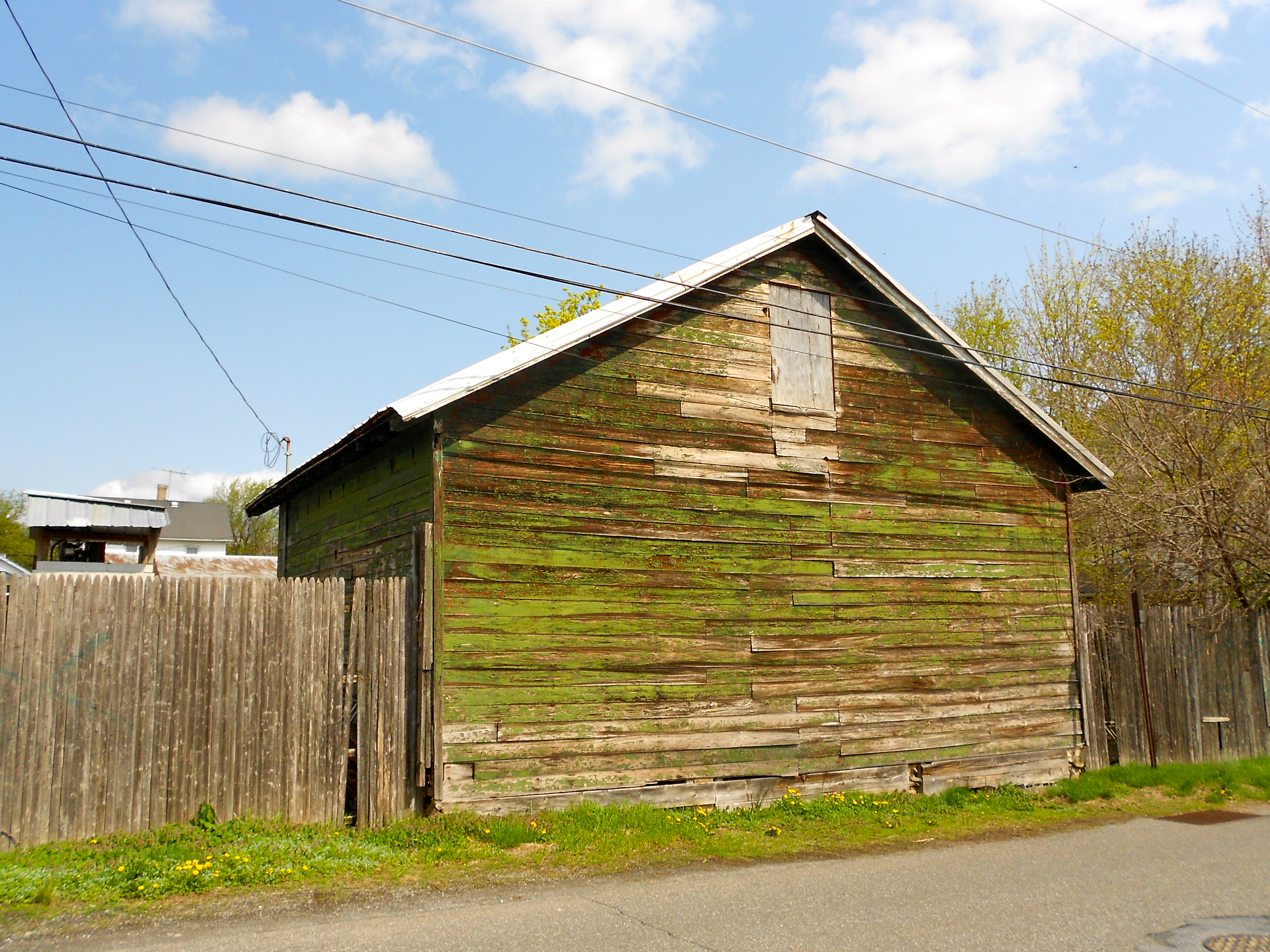
Shed on Main Street

Toughkenamon is located at 39°49′48″N 75°45′32″W (39.829874, -75.758847).

According to the United States Census Bureau, the CDP has a total area of 2.1 square miles (5.4 km^{2}), of which 0.48% is water.

== Transportation ==
Toughkenamon is located east of Pennsylvania Route 41 in Avondale on the old Baltimore Pike, a few miles west-southwest of Kennett Square. Interstate 95, U.S. 1, Pennsylvania 41, and U.S. 30 are used as approaches to Toughkenamon. The Philadelphia & Baltimore Central Railroad (now East Penn Railroad) parallels Baltimore Pike, originally crossing the Pennsylvania Rail Road in Avondale. East Penn Railroad now connects Toughkenamon to the national freight network at Chadd's Ford. New Garden Airport is to the northeast on Toughkenamon Hill.

== Demographics ==
At the 2020 census there were 1,479 people in 393 households, including 301 families, in the CDP. The population density was 664.8 inhabitants per square mile (256.7/km^{2}). There were 393 housing units at an average density of 187.9 per square mile (72.5/km^{2}). The racial makeup of the CDP was 73.55% White, 2.62% African American, 0.10% Native American, 0.83% Asian, 20.56% from other races, and 2.31% from two or more races. Hispanic or Latino of any race were 48.56%.

There were 393 households, 35.8% had children under the age of 18 living with them, 62.5% were married couples living together, 7.1% had a female householder with no husband present, and 25.5% were non-families. 17.0% of households were made up of individuals, and 10.1% were one person aged 65 or older. The average household size was 3.23 and the average family size was 3.21.

The age distribution was 26.1% under the age of 18, 14.2% from 18 to 24, 35.8% from 25 to 44, 14.3% from 45 to 64, and 9.5% 65 or older. The median age was 32 years. For every 100 females, there were 137.2 males. For every 100 females age 18 and over, there were 128.5 males.

The median household income was $61,109 and the median family income was $62,984. Males had a median income of $27,500 versus $38,000 for females. The per capita income for the CDP was $18,745. None of the families and 4.9% of the population were living below the poverty line, including no under eighteens and 17.3% of those over 64.
