= Hephzibah, Pennsylvania =

Unincorporated community in Pennsylvania, US

- Location in Pennsylvania Hephzibah (the United States)
- Coordinates: 39°57′02″N 75°48′29″W
- Country: United States
- State: Pennsylvania
- County: Chester
- Township: East Fallowfield
- Elevation: 518 ft (158 m)
- Time zone: UTC-5 (Eastern (EST))
  - Summer (DST): UTC-4 (EDT)
- ZIP codes: 19320
- Area code: 610
- FIPS code: 42-33976
- GNIS feature ID: 1203786

Hephzibah is a populated place situated in East Fallowfield Township in Chester County, Pennsylvania, United States. It has an estimated elevation of 518 feet (158 m) above sea level.
