= Hickory Hill, Chester County, Pennsylvania =

Unincorporated community in Pennsylvania, US

- Location of Hickory Hill in Pennsylvania Hickory; Hill (the United States)
- Coordinates: 39°44′54″N 75°55′15″W
- Country: United States
- State: Pennsylvania
- County: Chester
- Township: Elk
- Elevation: 449 ft (137 m)
- Time zone: UTC-5 (Eastern (EST))
  - Summer (DST): UTC-4 (EDT)
- ZIP codes: 19363
- Area code: 610
- FIPS code: 42-34296
- GNIS feature ID: 1176961

Hickory Hill (formerly the village of Nottinghamdale) is a populated place located within Elk Township in Chester County, Pennsylvania, United States. It has an estimated elevation of 449 feet (137 m) above sea level.

== History ==
Hickory Hill was home to grist- and sawmills, a limekiln, and the Little Elk Friends Meeting, which was founded in 1825.

The Hickory Hill post office was established June 18, 1850 & the first postmaster was Wm. C. Shuler.

After the Hickory Hill post office was established in 1850 the town's name changed from Nottinghamdale to the currently known name Hickory Hill.
