= Hayesville, Pennsylvania =

Unincorporated community in Pennsylvania, US

- Location of Hayesville in Pennsylvania Hayesville (the United States)
- Coordinates: 39°49′13″N 75°57′53″W
- Country: United States
- State: Pennsylvania
- County: Chester
- Township: Lower Oxford
- Elevation: 581 ft (177 m)
- Time zone: UTC-5 (Eastern (EST))
  - Summer (DST): UTC-4 (EDT)
- ZIP codes: 19363
- Area codes: 610, 484
- FIPS code: 42-33248
- GNIS feature ID: 1203763

Hayesville is a populated place located within Lower Oxford Township in Chester County, Pennsylvania, United States. It has an estimated elevation of 581 feet (177 m) above sea level.
