= Harmonyville, Pennsylvania =

Unincorporated community in Pennsylvania, US

- Location in Pennsylvania Harmonyville (the United States)
- Coordinates: 40°11′21″N 75°43′23″W
- Country: United States
- State: Pennsylvania
- County: Chester
- Township: Warwick
- Elevation: 490 ft (150 m)
- Time zone: UTC-5 (Eastern (EST))
  - Summer (DST): UTC-4 (EDT)
- ZIP codes: 19520
- Area codes: 610, 484
- FIPS code: 42-32744
- GNIS feature ID: 1176562

Harmonyville is a populated place situated in Warwick Township in Chester County, Pennsylvania, United States. It has an estimated elevation of 492 feet (150 m) above sea level.
