= Collegium Charter School =

Coordinates: 40.0202°N 75.6599°W

Location
- 435 Creamery Way, Suite 300; Exton, Pennsylvania; United States

Information
- Type: Public school, secondary school, charter school
- Established: 1999
- Status: Open
- CEO: Marita Barber
- Grades: K-12
- Enrollment: Nearly 3,000 Students
- Athletics: Beginning with the 2019-2020 school year, CCS will join the Bicentennial Athletic League (BAL).
- Mascot: Carl the Cougar
- Nickname: Cougars

Collegium Charter School (CCS) is a tuition-free, independent K-12 public school offering families a choice for their children’s elementary and secondary education. Located in Exton, Pennsylvania in the Oaklands Corporate Center, CCS's campus consists of seven student buildings (four Elementary, two Middle Schools, and one High School) and one building for Administrative Offices.

Students from all over Pennsylvania attend CCS. As of 2019, transportation for Collegium families is provided by the following school districts: Coatesville, Downingtown, Great Valley, Owen J. Roberts, Phoenixville, Tredyffrin-Easttown, Unionville Chadds Ford, and West Chester.

== Brief history ==
CCS was started in January 1999 by a group of West Chester residents, including Bill Winters (former CEO), Anne Rich, and Beth Jones. On March 20, 2015, the school issued a public press release, setting forth that Bill Winters, the current CEO of CCS, would be retiring, after serving in that position for over 16 years, and that a search for a new CEO would be commenced. On July 1, 2015, CCS announced by way of Press Release, the selection of Dr. Antoinette Rath as the school's second CEO.

In terms of athletics, CCS joined the Bicentennial Athletic League (BAL) beginning in the 2019-2020 school year. The BAL boasts 17 schools and participates in District 1 of the Pennsylvania Interscholastic Athletic Association (PIAA). CCS previously participated with nine other schools in the Tri-County Independent School League (TCISL).
