= Cromby, Pennsylvania =

Unincorporated community in Pennsylvania, US

Coordinates: 40.1504°N 75.5303°W

Cromby is an unincorporated community in East Pikeland Township, Chester County, Pennsylvania, United States. The now closed Cromby Power Plant is located in Cromby, at an elevation of 118 feet above MSL.
