= Chester County, Pennsylvania =

County in Pennsylvania, United States

- County
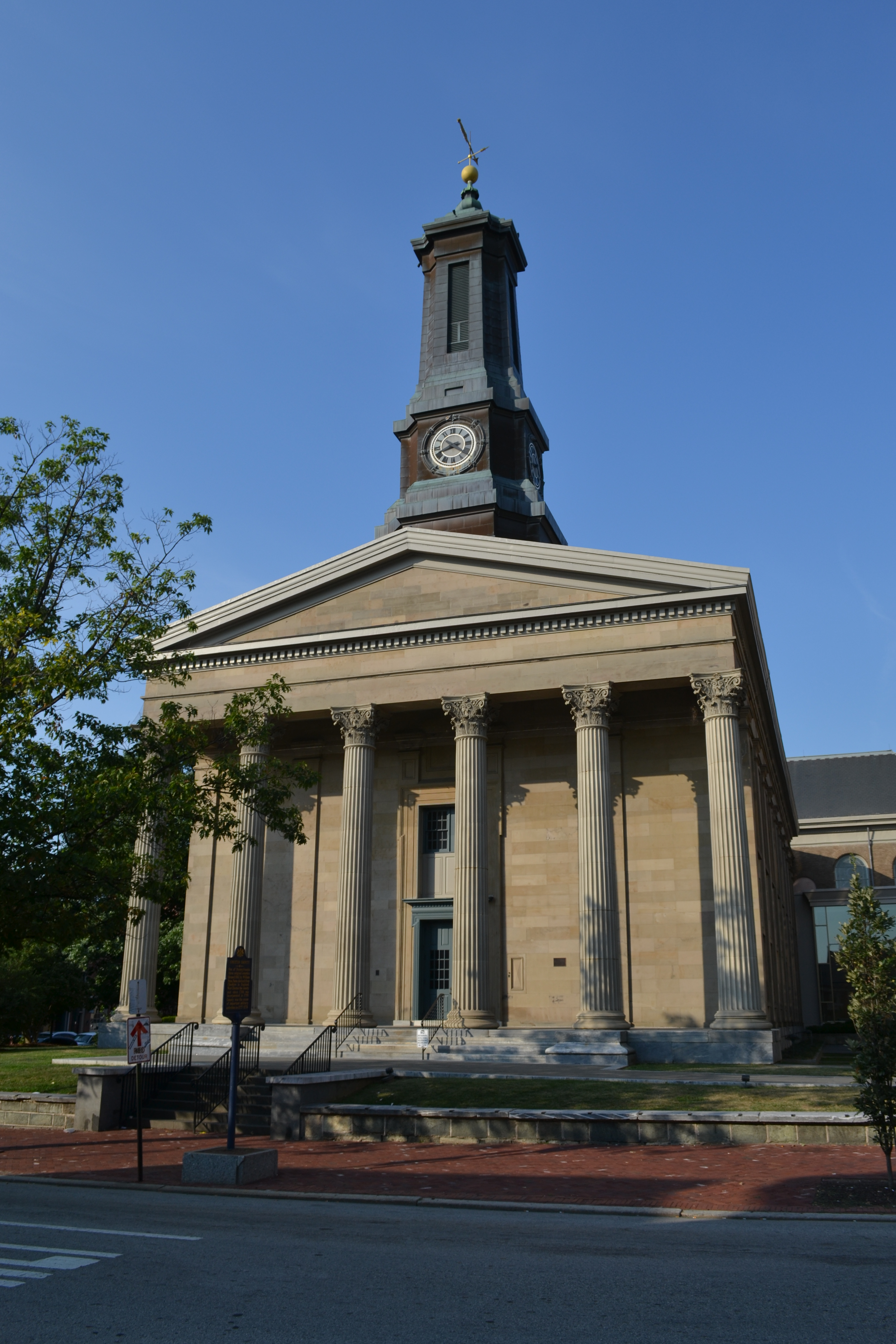
- Chester County Courthouse

- Flag Seal

- Location within the U.S. state of Pennsylvania
- Interactive map of Chester County, Pennsylvania
- Coordinates: 39.97°N 75.75°W
- Country: United States
- State: Pennsylvania
- Founded: August 24, 1682
- Named for: Chester, England
- Seat: West Chester
- Largest borough: Tredyffrin Township

Government
  - County commission: Josh Maxwell (D); Marian Moskowitz (D); Eric Roe (R)

Area
  - Total: 759 sq mi (1,970 km^{2})
  - Land: 751 sq mi (1,950 km^{2})
  - Water: 8.7 sq mi (23 km^{2}) 1.1%

Population (2020)
  - Total: 534,413
  - Estimate (2025): 557,116 ▲
  - Density: 747/sq mi (288/km^{2})
- Time zone: UTC−5 (Eastern)
  - Summer (DST): UTC−4 (EDT)
- Congressional districts: 5th, 6th
- Website: chesco.org

Pennsylvania Historical Marker
- Designated: October 26, 1982

Chester County, colloquially referred to as Chesco, is a county in the U.S. state of Pennsylvania. It is located in the Philadelphia metropolitan area, part of the southeastern portion of the state. As of the 2020 census, the population was 545,823, increasing by 7.1% from 498,886 during the 2010 census. The county seat is West Chester. The most populous of the county's 73 municipalities, including cities, boroughs, and townships is Tredyffrin Township. The most populous boroughs are West Chester and Phoenixville. Coatesville is the only municipality in the county that is classified as a city.

Chester County was one of the three original Pennsylvania counties created by William Penn in 1682. It was named for Chester, England. It is part of the Philadelphia-Camden-Wilmington, PA-NJ-DE-MD metropolitan statistical area. Along with northern Delaware County and southern Montgomery County, eastern Chester County is home to many communities that comprise part of the Philadelphia Main Line western suburbs of Philadelphia.

As of 2020, the county had the highest median household income level in Pennsylvania, and the 35th-highest in the nation.

== History ==
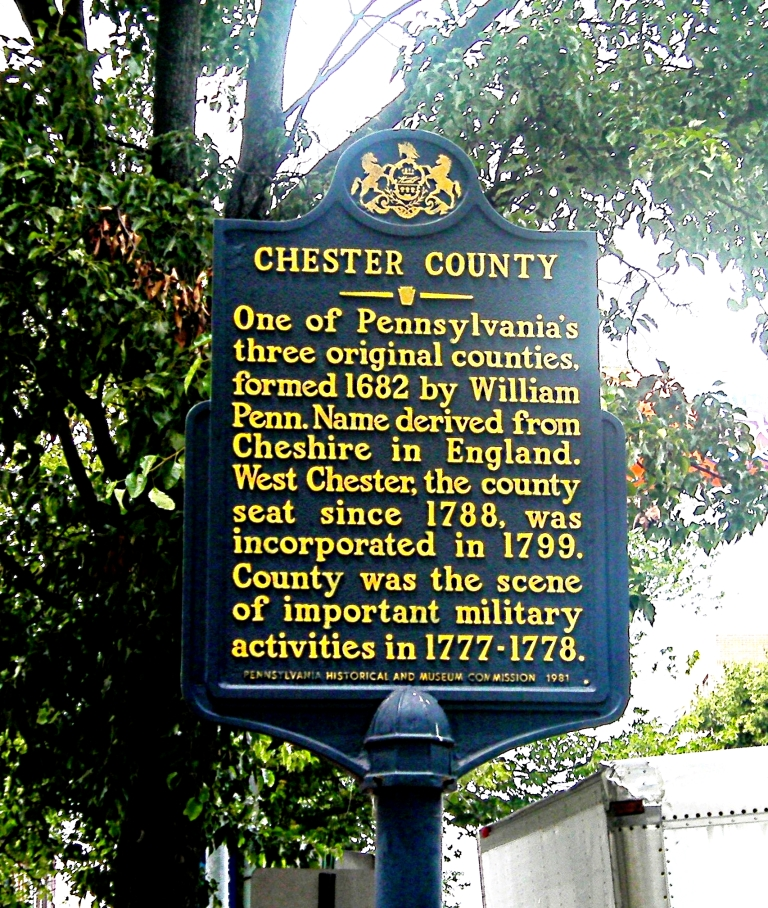
A historic marker describing Chester County

Philadelphia, Bucks, and Chester were the three counties created by William Penn on August 24, 1682, in the colonial-era Province of Pennsylvania.

At the time, Chester County's borders were Philadelphia County to the north, the ill-defined western edge of the colony, located approximately at the Susquehanna River to the west, the Delaware River to the east, and Delaware and Maryland to the south. Chester County replaced the Pennsylvania portion of New Netherland's upland in New York, which was officially eliminated when Pennsylvania was chartered on March 4, 1681, and ceased existing in June of that year. Much of the Welsh Tract was in eastern Chester County, and Welsh place names, given by early settlers, continue to predominate there.

The fourth county in the state, Lancaster County, was formed from Chester County on May 10, 1729. On March 11, 1752, Berks County was formed from the northern section of Chester County and parts of Lancaster and Philadelphia counties.

The southern border of Chester County is the Mason–Dixon line, surveyed in 1765. An error in surveying resulted in the Wedge, extending south of the line. Chester County claimed the Wedge until 1921, when it was ceded to Delaware.

The original Chester County seat was the City of Chester, a center of naval shipbuilding, at the eastern edge of the county. In an effort to accommodate the increased population of the western part of the county, the county seat was moved to a more central location in 1788; in order to mollify the eastern portion of the county, the village, known as Turk's Head, was renamed West Chester. In response to the new location of the county seat, the eastern portion of the county separated and formed the new Delaware County in 1789 with the City of Chester as its county seat.

Much of the history of Chester County arises from its location between Philadelphia and the Susquehanna River. The first "road to the West," a reference to Lancaster County, passed through the central part of Chester County, following the Great Valley westward; with some realignments, it became the Lincoln Highway and later U.S. Route 30. This road is still named Lancaster Avenue in most of the Chester County towns it runs through. The first railroad, which became the Pennsylvania Railroad, followed much the same route, and the Reading Railroad progressed up the Schuylkill River to Reading. Industry tended to concentrate along the rail lines. Easy transportation allowed workers to commute to urban jobs, and the rise of the suburbs followed. To this day, the county's developed areas extend along major lines of transportation.

During the American Revolutionary War, the Battle of Brandywine was fought in the southeastern part of the county. The Battle of the Clouds and the Battle of Paoli both took place in the northeastern part of the county, along with George Washington's encampment at Valley Forge.

== Geography ==
According to the U.S. Census Bureau, the county has a total area of 759 square miles (1,970 km^{2}), of which 751 square miles (1,950 km^{2}) is land and 8.7 square miles (23 km^{2}) (1.1%) is water. The topography consists of rolling hills and valleys and it is part of the region known as the Piedmont.

Watersheds that serve Chester County include the Octoraro, Brandywine, and Chester creeks, and the Schuylkill River. Many of the soils are fertile, rich loam as much as twenty-four inches thick; together with the temperate climate, this was long a major agricultural area. Because of its proximity to Philadelphia, Chester County has seen large waves of development over the past half-century due to suburbanization. Although development in Chester County has increased, agriculture is still a major part of the county's economy, and the number of horse farms is increasing in the county. Mushroom growing is a specialty in the southern portion of the county.

Chester County is the only county to border both Delaware and Maryland.

Elevations (in feet): High point—1020 Welsh Mt., Honeybrook Twp. Other high points—960 Thomas Hill, Warwick Twp; 960 Barren Hill, West Caln Twp. Low point—66 Schuylkill River, Chester-Montgomery county line. Cities and boroughs: Coatesville 314; Downingtown 255; Kennett Square 300; Oxford 535; Parkesburg 542; Phoenixville 127; Spring City 114; West Chester 459.

=== Adjacent counties ===
- Berks County (north)
- Montgomery County (northeast)
- Delaware County (east)
- New Castle County, Delaware (southeast)
- Cecil County, Maryland (south)
- Lancaster County (west)

=== National protected area ===
- Valley Forge National Historical Park (part)

=== State protected areas ===
- French Creek State Park
- Marsh Creek State Park
- White Clay Creek Preserve

=== Major roads and highways ===
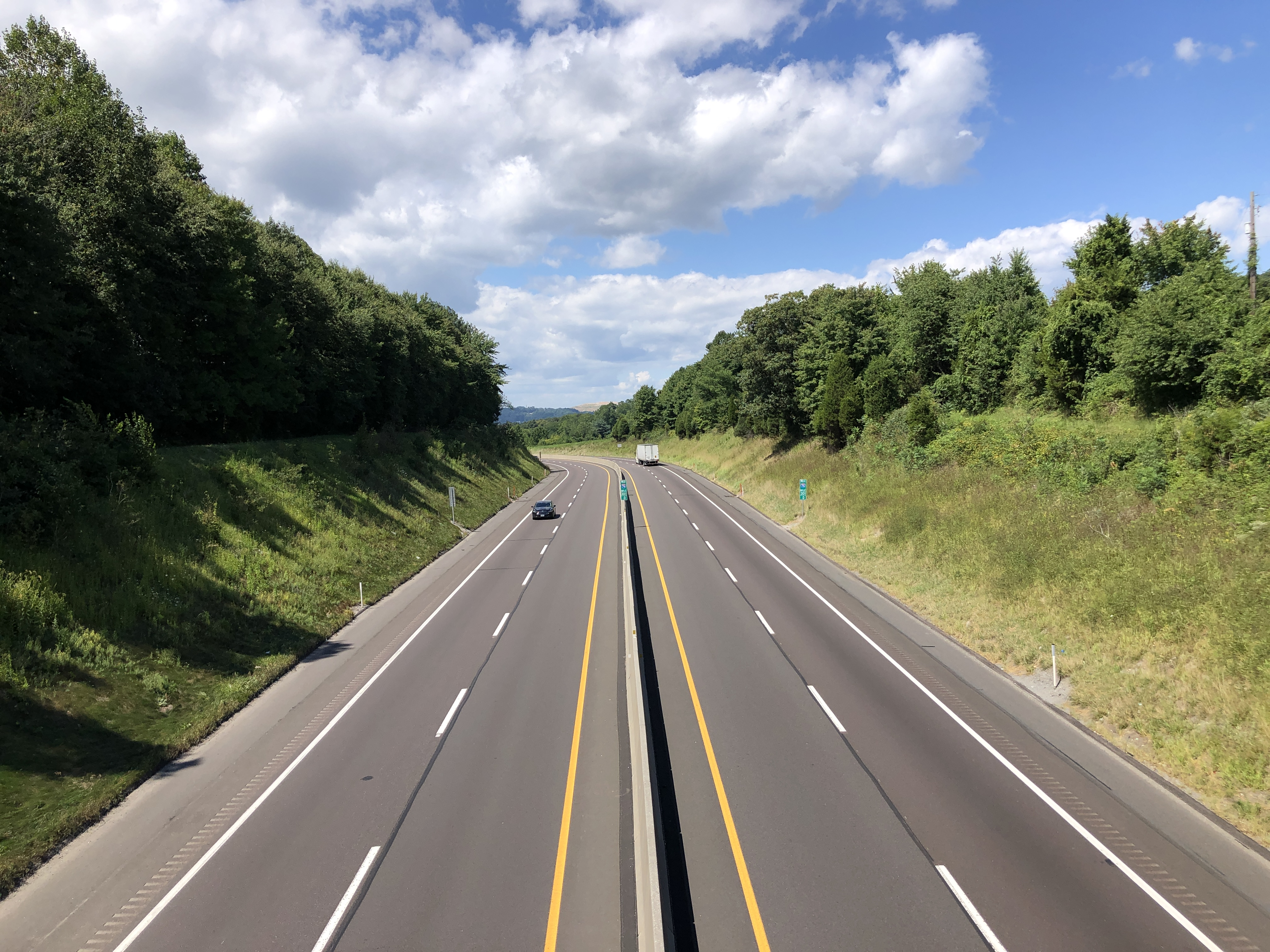
I-76/Pennsylvania Turnpike westbound in Chester County

- I-76 / Penna Turnpike
- US 1
- US 30
- US 30 Bus.
- US 202
- US 322
- US 322 Bus.
- US 422
- PA 3
- PA 10
- PA 23
- PA 29
- PA 41
- PA 52
- PA 82
- PA 100
- PA 113
- PA 162
- PA 252
- PA 272
- PA 282
- PA 340
- PA 345
- PA 352
- PA 372
- PA 401
- PA 472
- PA 724
- PA 796
- PA 841
- PA 842
- PA 896
- PA 926

== Economy and environment ==
Lanchester Landfill, located on the border of Chester and Lancaster Counties, captures methane which is sold for renewable natural gas credits, and piped to seven local businesses. This reduces the county's methane emissions, and provides an alternative to fracking for shale gas. In addition, several companies have their headquarters or a major presence in the county including Bentley Systems, EBS Healthcare, Main Line Health, Lavazza North America (formerly Mars Drinks), Depuy Synthes (part of Johnson & Johnson), Metabo, QVC, Hankin Group, Axalta Coating Systems, CTDI, Pactiv, Ricoh Americas, Blinding Edge Pictures, J.G. Wentworth, The Vanguard Group, and Victory Brewing Company among others.

== Demographics ==
Historical population
Census	Pop.	Note	%±
1790	27,829		—
1800	32,093		15.3%
1810	39,596		23.4%
1820	44,451		12.3%
1830	50,910		14.5%
1840	57,515		13.0%
1850	66,438		15.5%
1860	74,578		12.3%
1870	77,805		4.3%
1880	83,481		7.3%
1890	89,377		7.1%
1900	95,695		7.1%
1910	109,213		14.1%
1920	115,120		5.4%
1930	126,629		10.0%
1940	135,626		7.1%
1950	159,141		17.3%
1960	210,608		32.3%
1970	278,311		32.1%
1980	316,660		13.8%
1990	376,396		18.9%
2000	433,501		15.2%
2010	498,886		15.1%
2020	534,413		7.1%
2025 (est.)	557,116	▲	4.2%
U.S. Decennial Census; 1790–1960 1900–1990; 1990–2000 2010–2019 2024

=== Racial and ethnic composition ===
Chester County, Pennsylvania – Racial and ethnic composition Note: the US Census treats Hispanic/Latino as an ethnic category. This table excludes Latinos from the racial categories and assigns them to a separate category. Hispanics/Latinos may be of any race.
Race / Ethnicity (NH = Non-Hispanic)	Pop 1980	Pop 1990	Pop 2000	Pop 2010	Pop 2020	% 1980	% 1990	% 2000	% 2010	% 2020
White alone (NH)	285,367	339,637	377,925	409,561	405,476	90.12%	90.23%	87.18%	82.10%	75.87%
Black or African American alone (NH)	22,797	23,479	26,395	29,388	28,391	7.20%	6.24%	6.09%	5.89%	5.31%
Native American or Alaska Native alone (NH)	263	443	479	535	532	0.08%	0.12%	0.11%	0.11%	0.10%
Asian alone (NH)	1,787	4,011	8,400	19,216	35,143	0.56%	1.07%	1.94%	3.85%	6.58%
Native Hawaiian or Pacific Islander alone (NH)	x	x	108	117	119	x	x	0.02%	0.02%	0.02%
Other race alone (NH)	708	261	448	600	2,249	0.22%	0.07%	0.10%	0.12%	0.42%
Mixed race or Multiracial (NH)	x	x	3,620	6,966	18,961	x	x	0.84%	1.40%	3.55%
Hispanic or Latino (any race)	5,738	8,565	16,126	32,503	43,542	1.81%	2.28%	3.72%	6.52%	8.15%
Total	316,660	376,396	433,501	498,886	534,413	100.00%	100.00%	100.00%	100.00%	100.00%

=== 2020 census ===
As of the 2020 census, the county had a population of 534,413 and a median age of 40.5 years. 22.7% of residents were under the age of 18 and 17.2% were 65 years of age or older. For every 100 females there were 96.3 males, and for every 100 females age 18 and over there were 93.8 males age 18 and over.

The racial makeup of the county was 77.3% White, 5.5% Black or African American, 0.3% American Indian and Alaska Native, 6.6% Asian, <0.1% Native Hawaiian and Pacific Islander, 3.5% from some other race, and 6.7% from two or more races. Hispanic or Latino residents of any race comprised 8.1% of the population.

80.7% of residents lived in urban areas, while 19.3% lived in rural areas.

There were 197,119 households in the county, of which 32.5% had children under the age of 18 living in them. Of all households, 57.6% were married-couple households, 14.7% were households with a male householder and no spouse or partner present, and 22.3% were households with a female householder and no spouse or partner present. About 23.3% of all households were made up of individuals and 10.4% had someone living alone who was 65 years of age or older.

There were 208,240 housing units, of which 5.3% were vacant. Among occupied housing units, 74.5% were owner-occupied and 25.5% were renter-occupied. The homeowner vacancy rate was 0.9% and the rental vacancy rate was 7.9%.

=== 2010 census ===
As of the 2010 census, the county was 82.1% White Non-Hispanic, 6.1% Black or African American, 0.2% Native American or Alaskan Native, 3.9% Asian, 0.0% Native Hawaiian, 1.8% were two or more races, and 2.4% were some other race. 6.5% of the population were Hispanic or Latino.

=== 2000 census ===
As of the census of 2000, there were 433,501 people, 157,905 households, and 113,375 families residing in the county. The population density was 573 inhabitants per square mile (221/km^{2}). There were 163,773 housing units at an average density of 217 units per square mile (84/km^{2}). The racial makeup of the county was 89.21% White, 6.24% Black or African American, 0.15% Native American, 1.95% Asian, 0.03% Pacific Islander, 1.35% from other races, and 1.06% from two or more races. 3.72% of the population were Hispanic or Latino of any race. 18.0% were of Irish, 17.3% German, 13.1% Italian, 10.1% English and 5.6% American ancestry. 91.4% spoke English and 3.7% Spanish as their first language.

There were 157,905 households, out of which 35.10% had children under the age of 18 living with them, 60.50% were married couples living together, 8.10% had a female householder with no husband present, and 28.20% were non-families. 22.60% of all households were made up of individuals, and 7.60% had someone living alone who was 65 years of age or older. The average household size was 2.65 and the average family size was 3.15.

In the county, the population was spread out, with 26.20% under the age of 18, 7.90% from 18 to 24, 30.40% from 25 to 44, 23.80% from 45 to 64, and 11.70% who were 65 years of age or older. The median age was 37 years. For every 100 females there were 96.40 males. For every 100 females age 18 and over, there were 93.10 males.

The median income for a household in the county was $65,295, and the median income for a family was $76,916 (these figures had risen to $80,818 and $97,894 respectively as of a 2007 estimate). Males had a median income of $51,223 versus $34,854 for females. The per capita income for the county was $31,627. About 3.10% of families and 5.20% of the population were below the poverty line, including 5.10% of those under age 18 and 5.50% of those age 65 or over.

The region was originally occupied by the Lenni Lenape people, who greeted European settlers in the seventeenth century with amity and kindness. British settlers were mostly English, Scotch-Irish and Welsh in ethnicity. From the late 19th to early 20th century, the industrial areas of the region, such as Coatesville, attracted immigrants and job seekers from Germany and Ireland, Eastern Europe, Italy, and the American rural South, with both black and white migrants coming north. Later Hispanic immigrants have included Puerto Ricans and, most recently, Mexicans.

Long a primarily rural area, Chester County has been the fastest-growing county in the Delaware Valley since 2020.

=== Religion ===
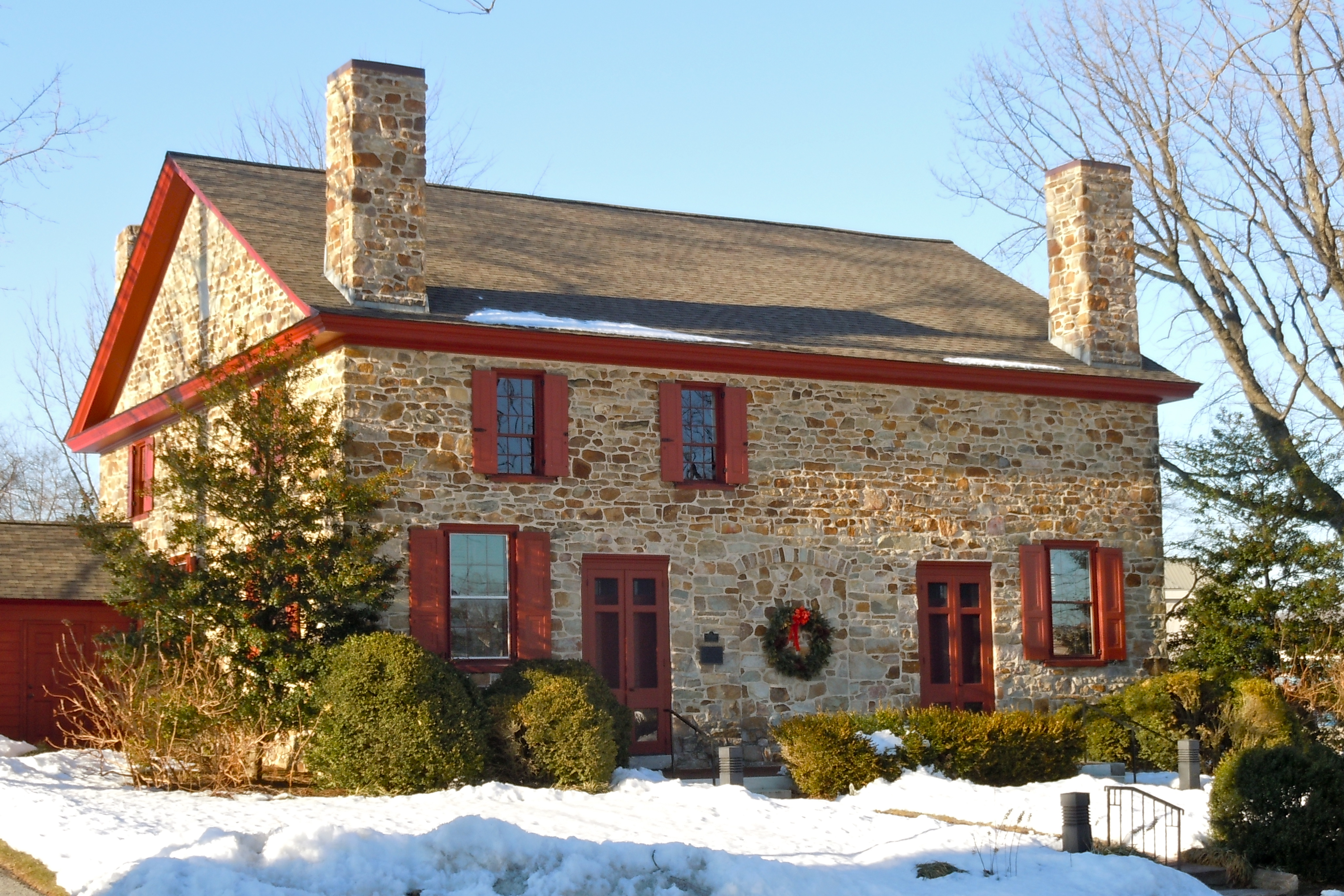
Uwchlan Meetinghouse in Uwchlan Township

In keeping with its colonial history, Chester County is home to a number of historic Quaker buildings, including Birmingham, Birmingham Orthodox, Bradford, Caln, Old Kennett, Parkersville, Schuylkill, Westtown, and Uwchlan meeting houses.

Other historic religious buildings include St. Malachi Church, southeastern Pennsylvania's oldest active Catholic mission church, and the Episcopal St. Mary's, St. Paul's, and St. Peter's churches, and Washington Memorial Chapel. The First Presbyterian Church of West Chester, Coventryville United Methodist Church, which is part of the Coventryville Historic District, and Beth Israel Congregation of Chester County, a Conservative synagogue in Coatesville, a site of Eastern European immigration in the 20th century, are located in the county.

== Politics ==
=== Voter registration ===
Chart of Voter Registration
1. Democratic (41.2%)
2. Republican (39.7%)
3. Independent (14.0%)
4. Other Parties (5.09%)

As of November 18, 2024, there were 396,404 registered voters in Chester County.

Voter Registration and Party Enrollment
Party	Number of Voters	Percentage
Democratic	163,426	41.23%
Republican	157,315	39.69%
Independent	55,490	13.99%
Third Parties	20,173	5.09%
Total	396,404	100%

=== Election results ===
2024 US presidential election in Chester County Harris—70-80% Harris—60-70% Harris—50-60% Harris—<50% Trump—50-60% Trump—60-70% Trump—70-80%

Chester County has historically been reliably Republican at the county level. After voting Democratic in 1856 for Pennsylvania native James Buchanan, it only did so three more times in the next 160 years—in 1912, 1964, and 2008. In recent elections, however, the county has been trending Democratic, although not as overwhelmingly as its fellow Main Line counties of Montgomery and Delaware. It remains the most conservative of these three.

In 2000, George W. Bush defeated Al Gore in the county by almost 10%, but in 2004, John Kerry cut Bush's margin of victory by over half, to just 4.5%. In 2008, Chester County voted for Barack Obama by 9%. In 2009, with a smaller turnout, Republican candidates swept all county-row offices, winning with an average margin of 20%. In 2012, the county voted for the Republican presidential candidate Mitt Romney, by a very small margin of 0.2%, or about 500 votes.

In 2016, despite Pennsylvania voting for a Republican presidential candidate for the first time since 1988, Chester County voted more Democratic than in 2012, with Hillary Clinton leading Donald Trump by over 25,000 votes or 9.4 percentage points; a 9.6 percentage point swing from 2012. It was the only county in the nation to flip to Clinton in a state that flipped to Trump. The only two statewide winners in 2016 to carry Chester County were U.S. Senator Pat Toomey (R) and Pennsylvania State Treasurer Joe Torsella (D). Republican candidates John Brown and John Rafferty carried Chester County, though both lost their races for Auditor General and Attorney General, respectively (Rafferty, a State Senator whose district includes northern Chester County, carried the county by a slim margin of 50 votes) Emphasizing its Democratic shift even further, Joe Biden defeated Donald Trump by 17.1 points in Chester County in the 2020 election; Trump's percentage of votes was the lowest for any Republican since 1912. Such a major shift in the county was a major factor in Biden's success in flipping Pennsylvania back into the Democratic column. Although Trump regained some ground when he won Pennsylvania in 2024, he still lost the county by 14 points to Kamala Harris, despite matching his 2016 performance there.

On November 8, 2017, Democrats made historic inroads in Chester County by winning their first county row office seats in history, picking up four row office seats. On November 5, 2019, Democrats swept the county row office seat elections and took a majority on the Board of Commissioners, both firsts in the county's history. In both the 2021 and 2023 elections, Democrats followed up with another sweep of the county row offices, along with retaining their majority on the Board of Commissioners.

United States presidential election results for Chester County, Pennsylvania
Year	Republican		Democratic		Third party(ies)	
Year	No.	%	No.	%	No.	%
1880	11,298	59.25%	7,524	39.46%	246	1.29%
1884	10,885	58.59%	7,102	38.23%	592	3.19%
1888	11,578	58.51%	7,541	38.11%	669	3.38%
1892	10,982	55.57%	7,850	39.72%	932	4.72%
1896	14,232	67.80%	6,058	28.86%	700	3.33%
1900	13,809	66.20%	6,214	29.79%	835	4.00%
1904	14,200	73.90%	4,342	22.60%	673	3.50%
1908	13,118	64.07%	6,555	32.01%	803	3.92%
1912	5,708	28.85%	6,901	34.88%	7,177	36.27%
1916	11,845	56.77%	8,514	40.81%	505	2.42%
1920	18,129	69.57%	7,004	26.88%	927	3.56%
1924	22,333	75.76%	5,946	20.17%	1,201	4.07%
1928	36,659	82.27%	7,689	17.26%	210	0.47%
1932	29,425	69.21%	12,040	28.32%	1,052	2.47%
1936	29,340	51.81%	26,676	47.11%	613	1.08%
1940	28,222	55.47%	22,473	44.17%	183	0.36%
1944	26,655	58.70%	18,548	40.84%	208	0.46%
1948	29,258	65.78%	14,670	32.98%	550	1.24%
1952	39,961	64.86%	21,490	34.88%	164	0.27%
1956	47,225	70.24%	19,957	29.68%	50	0.07%
1960	53,059	63.64%	30,167	36.18%	147	0.18%
1964	40,280	45.46%	47,940	54.10%	390	0.44%
1968	56,073	57.19%	32,606	33.25%	9,372	9.56%
1972	72,726	68.44%	31,118	29.29%	2,415	2.27%
1976	67,686	60.42%	42,712	38.13%	1,628	1.45%
1980	73,046	60.92%	34,307	28.61%	12,543	10.46%
1984	92,221	70.11%	38,870	29.55%	440	0.33%
1988	93,522	67.00%	44,853	32.13%	1,210	0.87%
1992	74,002	43.73%	59,643	35.25%	35,563	21.02%
1996	77,029	48.64%	64,783	40.91%	16,554	10.45%
2000	100,080	53.33%	82,047	43.72%	5,549	2.96%
2004	120,036	52.00%	109,708	47.53%	1,079	0.47%
2008	114,421	44.83%	137,833	54.00%	2,998	1.17%
2012	124,840	49.43%	124,311	49.22%	3,425	1.36%
2016	116,114	42.53%	141,682	51.90%	15,202	5.57%
2020	128,565	40.72%	182,372	57.76%	4,816	1.53%
2024	137,299	42.06%	184,281	56.45%	4,849	1.49%

United States Senate election results for Chester County, Pennsylvania1
Year	Republican		Democratic		Third party(ies)	
Year	No.	%	No.	%	No.	%
1994	68,184	58.69%	42,156	36.28%	5,843	5.03%
2000	117,092	63.25%	63,259	34.17%	4,768	2.58%
2006	77,948	44.99%	95,293	55.01%	0	0.00%
2012	119,296	47.80%	125,671	50.36%	4,598	1.84%
2018	92,380	39.29%	140,138	59.60%	2,613	1.11%
2024	138,271	42.60%	178,765	55.07%	7,551	2.33%

United States Senate election results for Chester County, Pennsylvania3
Year	Republican		Democratic		Third party(ies)	
Year	No.	%	No.	%	No.	%
1992	86,581	51.81%	70,948	42.45%	9,592	5.74%
1998	71,508	70.55%	24,611	24.28%	5,246	5.18%
2004	132,826	59.30%	82,186	36.69%	8,979	4.01%
2010	92,667	53.44%	80,738	46.56%	0	0.00%
2016	133,662	49.36%	127,552	47.10%	9,588	3.54%
2022	104,020	40.32%	147,559	57.20%	6,384	2.47%

Pennsylvania Gubernatorial election results for Chester County
Year	Republican		Democratic		Third party(ies)	
Year	No.	%	No.	%	No.	%
1970	39,723	50.81%	35,282	45.13%	3,175	4.06%
1974	42,948	53.99%	35,835	45.05%	765	0.96%
1978	58,481	68.79%	25,935	30.51%	596	0.70%
1982	61,616	68.19%	28,111	31.11%	635	0.70%
1986	58,518	66.57%	28,572	32.50%	821	0.93%
1990	44,307	47.52%	48,935	52.48%	0	0.00%
1994	61,890	53.10%	34,652	29.73%	20,019	17.17%
1998	68,572	67.62%	21,337	21.04%	11,500	11.34%
2002	58,669	41.08%	81,996	57.41%	2,149	1.50%
2006	60,437	34.85%	112,960	65.15%	0	0.00%
2010	97,112	55.96%	76,440	44.04%	0	0.00%
2014	75,097	48.20%	80,701	51.80%	0	0.00%
2018	87,873	37.11%	145,212	61.33%	3,690	1.56%
2022	92,585	35.88%	160,796	62.32%	4,644	1.80%

== Government ==
=== County Commissioners ===
Chester County is administered by a three-person Board of Commissioners who serve four-year terms. Elections take place in the odd-numbered years that precede U.S. presidential elections, with the next election scheduled for 2027. The commissioners have selective policy-making authority to provide certain local services and facilities on a county-wide basis. Accordingly, the commissioners are responsible for the management of the fiscal and administrative functions of the county. Currently, the Democrats hold a majority on the board, with Commissioners Josh Maxwell and Marian Moskowitz holding two of the three seats. County law requires the minority party to be represented with one seat, which is held by Eric Roe of the Republican Party.

As of December 30, 2023:

Commissioner	Party	Position
Josh Maxwell	Democratic	Chair
Marian Moskowitz	Democratic	Vice Chair
Eric Roe	Republican	

=== County row officers ===
As of October 20, 2024:

Office	Official	Party	Term ends
Clerk of Courts	Yolanda Van de Krol	Democratic	2025
Controller	Margaret Reif	Democratic	2025
Coroner	Sophia Garcia-Jackson	Democratic	2025
District Attorney	Christopher de Barrena-Sarobe	Democratic	2027
Prothonotary	Kristen Hume	Republican	Acting (Note: Serving in an Acting capacity after the resignation of Deborah Bookman in 2024. A new election for this office will be held in 2027.)
Recorder of Deeds	Diane O'Dwyer	Democratic	2027
Register of Wills	Michele Vaughn	Democratic	2027
Sheriff	Kevin Dykes	Democratic	2027
Treasurer	Patricia Maisano	Democratic	2025

=== United States House of Representatives ===
As of January 3, 2023:

District	Representative	Party
5	Mary Gay Scanlon	Democratic
6	Chrissy Houlahan	Democratic

=== United States Senate ===
As of January 3, 2025:

Senator	Party
John Fetterman	Democratic
Dave McCormick	Republican

=== State House of Representatives ===
State House districts in Chester County

As of January 3, 2025:

District	Representative	Party
13	John Lawrence	Republican
26	Paul Friel	Democratic
74	Dan Williams	Democratic
155	Danielle Otten	Democratic
156	Chris Pielli	Democratic
157	Melissa Shusterman	Democratic
158	Christina Sappey	Democratic
160	Craig Williams	Republican
167	Kristine Howard	Democratic

=== State Senate ===
State Senate districts in Chester County

As of January 3, 2025:

District	Senator	Party
9	John Kane	Democratic
19	Carolyn Comitta	Democratic
44	Katie Muth	Democratic

== Education ==
=== Colleges and universities ===
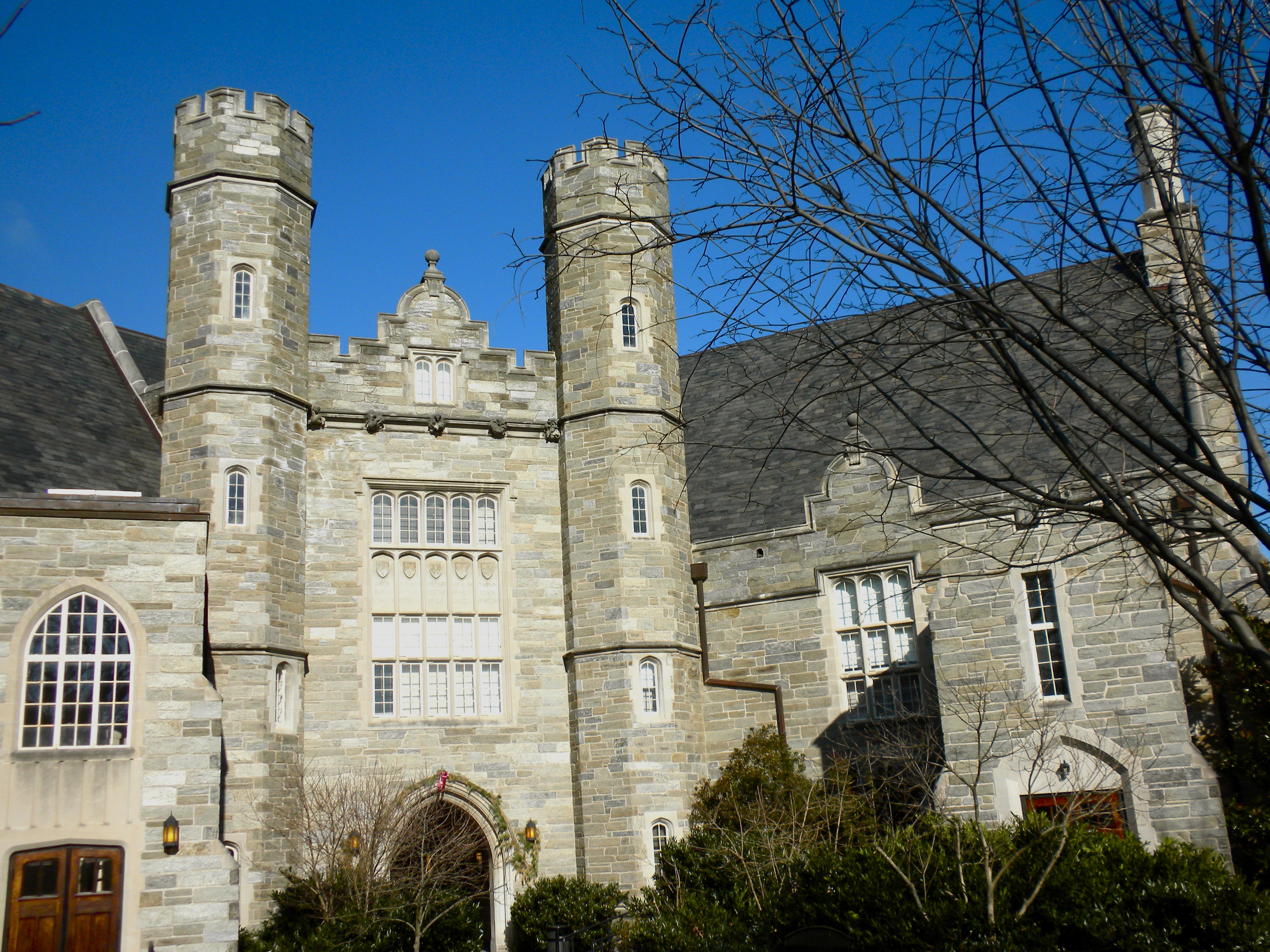
Philips Memorial Building at West Chester University

- Cheyney University of Pennsylvania (partially in Delaware County)
- Delaware County Community College (locations in Downingtown and West Grove)
- Immaculata University
- Lansdale School of Business (location in Phoenixville)
- Lincoln University
- Penn State Great Valley School of Graduate Professional Studies
- West Chester University

=== Public school districts ===
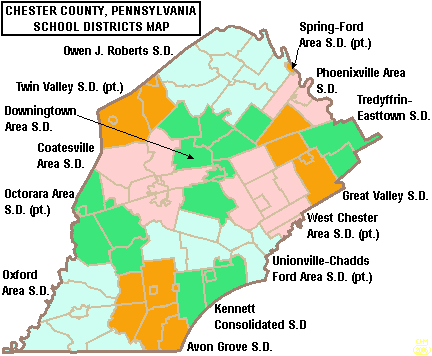
Map of Chester County's public school districts

School districts include:

- Avon Grove School District
- Coatesville Area School District
- Downingtown Area School District
- Great Valley School District
- Kennett Consolidated School District
- Octorara Area School District
- Owen J. Roberts School District
- Oxford Area School District
- Phoenixville Area School District
- Spring-Ford Area School District
- Tredyffrin/Easttown School District
- Twin Valley School District
- Unionville-Chadds Ford School District
- West Chester Area School District

=== Charter schools ===
- Achievement House Charter School grades 9–12, Exton
- Avon Grove Charter School grades K-12, West Grove
- Chester County Family Academy Charter School grades K-2, West Chester
- Collegium Charter School grades K-12, Exton
- Pennsylvania Leadership Charter School K-12, West Chester
- Renaissance Academy Charter School grades K-12, Phoenixville
- Sankofa Academy Charter School grades 5–8, West Chester
- 21st Century Cyber Charter School grades 6–12. Downingtown.

=== Independent schools ===
- Bishop Shanahan High School (Archdiocese of Philadelphia)
- Center for Arts and Technology (Administered by Chester County Intermediate Unit)
- Chesterbrook Academy Preschool (West Chester, Pennsylvania)
- Chesterbrook Academy Elementary School (West Chester, Pennsylvania)
- Church Farm School (now called CFS the School at Church Farm)
- Delaware Valley Friends School
- Devon Preparatory School
- Fairville Friends School (Chadds Ford, Pennsylvania)
- Goshen Friends School (West Chester, Pennsylvania)
- Kimberton Waldorf School (Kimberton, Pennsylvania)
- London Grove Friends Kindergarten (Kennett Square, Pennsylvania)
- Malvern Preparatory School
- Montgomery School
- The Concept School - 6th through 12th Grade
- Upattinas School and Resource Center (Glenmoore, Pennsylvania)
- Upland Country Day School (UCDS) - Pre-K through 9th Grade
- Villa Maria Academy (Malvern, Pennsylvania)
- Villa Maria Academy Lower School (Immaculata, Pennsylvania)
- West-Mont Christian Academy
- West Chester Friends School
- West Fallowfield Christian School
- Westtown School
- Windsor Christian Academy - K through 6th Grade
- Windsor Christian Preschool
- Regina Luminis Academy

=== Libraries ===
The Chester County Library System in southeastern Pennsylvania was organized in 1965. It is a federated system composed of a District Center Library in Exton and sixteen member libraries. The system provides materials and information for life, work and pleasure.

== Communities ==
Map of Chester County with labels showing cities (in yellow), boroughs (in red), townships (in white), and census-designated places (in blue)

Under Pennsylvania law, there are four types of incorporated municipalities: cities, boroughs, townships, and, in at most two cases, towns. The post office uses community names and boundaries that usually do not correspond to the townships, and usually only have the same names as the municipalities for the cities and boroughs. The names used by the post office are generally used by residents to describe where they live. The following cities, boroughs and townships are located in Chester County:

=== City ===
- Coatesville

=== Boroughs ===
- Atglen
- Avondale
- Downingtown
- Elverson
- Honey Brook
- Kennett Square
- Malvern
- Modena
- Oxford
- Parkesburg
- Phoenixville
- South Coatesville
- Spring City
- West Chester (county seat)
- West Grove

=== Townships ===
- Birmingham
- Caln
- Charlestown
- East Bradford
- East Brandywine
- East Caln
- East Coventry
- East Fallowfield
- East Goshen
- East Marlborough
- East Nantmeal
- East Nottingham
- East Pikeland
- East Vincent
- East Whiteland
- Easttown
- Elk
- Franklin
- Highland
- Honey Brook
- Kennett
- London Britain
- London Grove
- Londonderry
- Lower Oxford
- New Garden
- New London
- Newlin
- North Coventry
- Penn
- Pennsbury
- Pocopson
- Sadsbury
- Schuylkill
- South Coventry
- Thornbury
- Tredyffrin
- Upper Oxford
- Upper Uwchlan
- Uwchlan
- Valley
- Wallace
- Warwick
- West Bradford
- West Brandywine
- West Caln
- West Fallowfield
- West Goshen
- West Marlborough
- West Nantmeal
- West Nottingham
- West Pikeland
- West Sadsbury
- West Vincent
- West Whiteland
- Westtown
- Willistown

=== Census-designated places ===
Census-designated places are unincorporated communities designated by the U.S. Census Bureau for the purposes of compiling demographic data. They are not actual jurisdictions under Pennsylvania law.

- Berwyn
- Caln
- Chadds Ford (partly in Delaware County)
- Chesterbrook
- Cheyney University (partly in Delaware County)
- Cochranville
- Devon
- Dilworthtown (partly in Delaware County)
- Eagle
- Eagleview
- Exton
- Frazer
- Glenmoore
- Hamorton
- Hayti
- Kenilworth
- Kimberton
- Lincoln University
- Lionville
- Marshallton
- Nottingham
- Paoli
- Pomeroy
- Pughtown
- Sadsburyville
- South Pottstown
- Thorndale
- Toughkenamon
- Unionville
- Westwood

=== Other unincorporated communities ===
- Birchrunville
- Black Horse
- Brandamore
- Bucktown
- Byers Station
- Cambridge (mostly in Lancaster County)
- Cedarville
- Chatham
- Chester Springs
- Chesterville
- Compass
- Coventryville
- Cromby
- Darlington Corners
- Daylesford
- Devault
- Doe Run
- Dorlan
- Embreeville
- Ercildoun
- Faggs Manor
- Glenloch
- Goshenville
- Hallman
- Harmonyville
- Hayesville
- Hephzibah
- Hickory Hill
- Hiestand
- Homeville
- Hopewell
- Humphreyville
- Icedale
- Ironsides
- Isabella
- Jennersville
- Kaolin
- Kelton
- Kemblesville
- Knauertown
- Landenberg
- Lenape
- Lewisville
- London Grove
- Longwood
- Lower Hopewell
- Ludwigs Corner
- Lyndell
- Mendenhall
- Milford Mills
- Mortonville
- Morstein
- Nantmeal Village
- Northbrook
- Parker Ford
- Pocopson
- Russellville
- Saint Peters
- Siousca
- Springdell
- Steelville
- Strafford
- Strickersville
- Sugartown
- Suplee
- Valley Forge
- Wagontown
- Warwick
- West Goshen
- Whitford
- Willowdale
- Yellow Springs

=== Historic community ===
- Barnestown

=== Population ranking ===
The population ranking of the following table is based on the 2020 census of Chester County.

† county seat

Rank	City/Town/etc.	Municipal type	Population (2020 Census)
1	Tredyffrin	Township	31,927
2	West Goshen	Township	23,040
3	West Whiteland	Township	19,632
4	Uwchlan	Township	19,161
5	West Chester †	Borough	18,671
6	Phoenixville	Borough	18,602
7	East Goshen	Township	18,410
8	Caln	Township	14,432
9	West Bradford	Township	14,316
10	East Whiteland	Township	13,917
11	Coatesville	City	13,350
12	Upper Uwchlan	Township	12,275
13	New Garden	Township	11,363
14	Willistown	Township	11,273
15	Westtown	Township	11,154
16	Easttown	Township	10,984
17	East Bradford	Township	10,339
18	East Brandywine	Township	9,738
19	East Nottingham	Township	8,982
20	West Caln	Township	8,910
21	London Grove	Township	8,797
22	Schuylkill	Township	8,780
23	North Coventry	Township	8,441
24	Kennett	Township	8,289
25	Honey Brook	Township	8,274
26	East Pikeland	Township	8,260
27	Valley	Township	7,985
28	Downingtown	Borough	7,892
29	East Fallowfield	Township	7,626
30	East Vincent	Township	7,433
31	West Brandywine	Township	7,331
32	East Marlborough	Township	7,306
33	East Coventry	Township	7,068
34	West Vincent	Township	6,668
35	Lionville	CDP	6,582
36	Paoli	CDP	6,002
37	Charlestown	Township	6,001
38	Kennett Square	Borough	5,936
39	New London	Township	5,810
40	Oxford	Borough	5,736
41	Penn	Township	5,644
42	Exton	CDP	5,622
43	Chesterbrook	CDP	5,610
44	Lower Oxford	Township	5,420
45	East Caln	Township	5,384
46	Pocopson	Township	4,455
47	Franklin	Township	4,433
48	Sadsbury	Township	4,125
49	Birmingham	Township	4,085
50	West Pikeland	Township	4,024
51	Pennsbury	Township	3,876
52	Parkesburg	Borough	3,862
53	Berwyn	CDP	3,775
54	Wallace	Township	3,711
55	Thorndale	CDP	3,669
56	Frazer	CDP	3,635
57	Spring City	Borough	3,494
58	Malvern	Borough	3,419
59	London Britain	Township	3,179
60	Thornbury	Township	3,177
61	Hayti	CDP	2,890
62	South Coventry	Township	2,796
63	West Grove	Borough	2,770
64	West Nottingham	Township	2,764
65	Warwick	Township	2,590
66	Upper Oxford	Township	2,560
67	Londonderry	Township	2,476
68	West Fallowfield	Township	2,459
69	West Sadsbury	Township	2,436
70	West Nantmeal	Township	2,251
71	Eagleview	CDP	2,193
72	South Pottstown	CDP	2,150
73	Kenilworth	CDP	2,148
74	Honey Brook	Borough	1,892
75	East Nantmeal	Township	1,832
76	Lincoln University	CDP	1,739
77	Elk	Township	1,698
78	South Coatesville	Borough	1,601
79	Devon	CDP	1,580
80	Caln	CDP	1,494
81	Chadds Ford (partially in Delaware County)	CDP	1,476
82	Newlin	Township	1,358
83	Elverson	Borough	1,330
84	Atglen	Borough	1,313
85	Toughkenamon	CDP	1,297
86	Avondale	Borough	1,274
87	Nottingham	CDP	1,260
88	Highland	Township	1,259
89	Dilworthtown (partially in Delaware County)	CDP	1,150
90	Pomeroy	CDP	1,085
91	Westwood	CDP	1,003
92	Sadsburyville	CDP	1,001
93	Glenmoore	CDP	872
94	Pughtown	CDP	849
95	West Marlborough	Township	819
96	Cochranville	CDP	631
97	Unionville	CDP	577
98	Kimberton	CDP	568
99	Cheyney University (partially in Delaware County)	CDP	565
100	Modena	Borough	541
101	Marshallton	CDP	500
102	Eagle	CDP	498
103	Hamorton	CDP	179

== Climate ==
Chester County has four distinct seasons and has a hot-summer humid continental climate (Dfa) except for some far southern lowlands and areas along the Schuylkill River which have a humid subtropical climate (Cfa). The hardiness zone 7a except for 7b near the Brandywine Creek in Birmingham Township.

Climate data for Honey Brook Twp (Elevation: 728 ft (222 m)) 1981–2010 Averages
Month	Jan	Feb	Mar	Apr	May	Jun	Jul	Aug	Sep	Oct	Nov	Dec	Year
Mean daily maximum °F (°C)	37.6 (3.1)	40.4 (4.7)	49.5 (9.7)	60.1 (15.6)	70.8 (21.6)	78.9 (26.1)	82.9 (28.3)	82.3 (27.9)	75.3 (24.1)	64.1 (17.8)	52.3 (11.3)	41.4 (5.2)	61.4 (16.3)
Daily mean °F (°C)	29.1 (−1.6)	31.3 (−0.4)	39.2 (4.0)	49.3 (9.6)	59.6 (15.3)	68.1 (20.1)	72.6 (22.6)	71.8 (22.1)	64.7 (18.2)	53.6 (12.0)	43.8 (6.6)	33.9 (1.1)	51.5 (10.8)
Mean daily minimum °F (°C)	20.7 (−6.3)	22.3 (−5.4)	28.9 (−1.7)	38.4 (3.6)	48.4 (9.1)	57.3 (14.1)	62.3 (16.8)	61.3 (16.3)	54.2 (12.3)	43.1 (6.2)	35.2 (1.8)	26.4 (−3.1)	41.6 (5.3)
Average precipitation inches (mm)	3.13 (80)	2.73 (69)	3.78 (96)	3.79 (96)	4.08 (104)	4.11 (104)	4.92 (125)	3.64 (92)	4.37 (111)	4.19 (106)	3.73 (95)	3.66 (93)	46.13 (1,172)
Average relative humidity (%)	69.9	67.8	62.1	62.2	64.5	72.7	72.6	73.6	74.7	72.6	72.4	72.8	69.8
Average dew point °F (°C)	20.5 (−6.4)	21.9 (−5.6)	27.3 (−2.6)	36.9 (2.7)	47.6 (8.7)	59.0 (15.0)	63.3 (17.4)	62.9 (17.2)	56.5 (13.6)	45.0 (7.2)	35.5 (1.9)	26.1 (−3.3)	42.0 (5.6)
Source: PRISM

Climate data for Coatesville, Pennsylvania
Month	Jan	Feb	Mar	Apr	May	Jun	Jul	Aug	Sep	Oct	Nov	Dec	Year
Mean daily maximum °C (°F)	3.7 (38.7)	4 (40)	10.2 (50.4)	16.8 (62.2)	22.7 (72.9)	27.4 (81.3)	29.9 (85.8)	28.7 (83.7)	25.4 (77.7)	19.1 (66.3)	11.9 (53.4)	5.3 (41.6)	17.1 (62.8)
Mean daily minimum °C (°F)	−6.2 (20.8)	−6.2 (20.9)	−1.4 (29.4)	3.8 (38.8)	9.5 (49.1)	14.6 (58.3)	17.3 (63.2)	16.3 (61.3)	12.4 (54.3)	5.7 (42.3)	0.4 (32.8)	−4.6 (23.8)	5.1 (41.2)
Average precipitation mm (inches)	91 (3.6)	84 (3.3)	97 (3.8)	94 (3.7)	99 (3.9)	110 (4.5)	110 (4.4)	110 (4.5)	94 (3.7)	84 (3.3)	84 (3.3)	97 (3.8)	1,160 (45.8)
Source: Weatherbase

Climate data for London Britain (Elevation: 167 ft (51 m)) 1981–2010 Averages
Month	Jan	Feb	Mar	Apr	May	Jun	Jul	Aug	Sep	Oct	Nov	Dec	Year
Mean daily maximum °F (°C)	40.4 (4.7)	43.4 (6.3)	52.2 (11.2)	64.1 (17.8)	73.6 (23.1)	82.5 (28.1)	86.7 (30.4)	85.0 (29.4)	77.9 (25.5)	66.6 (19.2)	55.5 (13.1)	44.3 (6.8)	64.4 (18.0)
Daily mean °F (°C)	31.9 (−0.1)	34.5 (1.4)	42.2 (5.7)	52.8 (11.6)	62.4 (16.9)	71.7 (22.1)	76.1 (24.5)	74.6 (23.7)	67.3 (19.6)	55.8 (13.2)	46.0 (7.8)	36.1 (2.3)	54.4 (12.4)
Mean daily minimum °F (°C)	23.5 (−4.7)	25.6 (−3.6)	32.2 (0.1)	41.5 (5.3)	51.3 (10.7)	61.0 (16.1)	65.6 (18.7)	64.2 (17.9)	56.8 (13.8)	44.9 (7.2)	36.4 (2.4)	27.9 (−2.3)	44.3 (6.8)
Average precipitation inches (mm)	3.30 (84)	2.79 (71)	4.21 (107)	3.72 (94)	4.18 (106)	4.05 (103)	4.66 (118)	3.66 (93)	4.48 (114)	3.49 (89)	3.50 (89)	3.73 (95)	45.77 (1,163)
Average relative humidity (%)	66.8	63.3	59.0	58.6	62.7	66.6	68.1	69.6	71.1	69.3	67.9	68.1	65.9
Average dew point °F (°C)	22.1 (−5.5)	23.3 (−4.8)	28.9 (−1.7)	38.7 (3.7)	49.5 (9.7)	60.0 (15.6)	64.8 (18.2)	64.0 (17.8)	57.6 (14.2)	45.9 (7.7)	36.0 (2.2)	26.6 (−3.0)	43.2 (6.2)
Source: PRISM

== Public health ==
=== Opioid crisis ===
In both 2018 and 2019, deaths from drug overdoses in Chester County declined. Of the 104 drug overdoses recorded by the coroner, an estimated 77 percent involved the presence of fentanyl. One of the reasons for the decline in overdose deaths was "the saturation across the county of Narcan, the anti-opioid nasal spray that can revive someone suffering an overdose." In 2019, any resident of Chester County could obtain a free Narcan dose at community training events across the county.

== Notable people ==
- Jesse B. Aikin (1808–1900), first to produce a song book with a seven-shape note system
- Samuel Barber (1910–1981), one of the most celebrated composers of the 20th century
- Eusebius Barnard (1802–1865), Quaker minister and station master on the Underground Railroad
- Mifflin E. Bell (1847–1904), architect who served from 1883 to 1886 as Supervising Architect of the US Treasury Department
- Daniel Garrison Brinton (1837–1899), physician and ethnologist who taught at the University of Pennsylvania
- Scott Brunner (born 1957), NFL quarterback during the 1980s
- Margaret F. Butler (1861–1931), professor of otorhinolaryngology at the Woman's Medical College of Pennsylvania
- Samuel Butler (1825–1891), Pennsylvania State Representative and Pennsylvania Treasurer from 1880 to 1882
- Smedley Butler (1881–1940), twice recipient of the Medal of Honor, thwarted the Business Plot, advocate for veterans, author
- William L. Carlisle (1890–1964), famous train robber
- Jefferson David Chalfant (1856–1931), painter best known for his trompe-l'œil still lifes
- John Cochran (1730–1807), physician and 4th Surgeon General of the United States Army
- James D. Corrothers (1869–1917), African American poet, journalist, minister, and friend of Paul Laurence Dunbar
- Isabel Darlington (1865–1950), lawyer and the first woman to gain admittance to the bar and practice law in Chester County
- Bruce Davidson (born 1949), multiple Olympian in equestrian eventing; noted competition-horse breeder and trainer
- Sarah Dolley (1829–1909), physician and the first woman to complete a medical internship in the United States
- Ryan Dunn (1977–2011), actor, television personality, and daredevil; died in a car crash in West Goshen
- William Hood Dunwoody (1841–1914), businessman and partner in the firm that became General Mills
- Phillip Dutton (born 1963), Australian-born Olympic-level equestrian rider in eventing
- Wharton Esherick (1887-1970), sculptor, designer, woodworker
- John Filson (1747–1788), author, historian, pioneer, surveyor, and founder of Cincinnati
- James Fitzpatrick (1748–1778), highwayman and loyalist during the American Revolutionary War
- Bartholomew Fussell (1794–1871), abolitionist active in the Underground Railroad; early advocate for women's careers in medicine
- Kyle Gallner (born 1986), actor
- Robert Grace (1709–1766), first manufacturer of the Franklin stove
- Joseph Graham (1759–1836), Revolutionary War militia officer, North Carolina politician, and ironmonger
- Isaac Israel Hayes (1832–1881), Arctic explorer and physician
- Francis James (1799–1886), lawyer, state senator, and member of the US House of Representatives
- Charlton Thomas Lewis (1834–1904), lawyer and lexicographer who compiled several Latin-English dictionaries
- George Lippard (1822–1854), novelist (The Quaker City; or, The Monks of Monk Hall), journalist, and social reformer
- Rebecca Webb Lukens (1794–1854), first female owner and manager of the company that became the Lukens Steel Mill
- William Maclay (1737–1804), Pennsylvania state legislator and US Senator who served in the 1st United States Congress
- Franklin MacVeagh (1837–1934), banker and U.S. Secretary of the Treasury
- Bam Margera (born 1979), professional skateboarder, television and radio personality, and daredevil
- Boyd Martin (born 1979), Australian-born equestrian competing in eventing; has participated in two Summer Olympics
- Jon Matlack (born 1950), baseball pitcher for the New York Mets and Texas Rangers (1971–83), All Star and N.L. champion
- Henry McBride (1867–1962), art critic who wrote for Art News, The Dial, and The New York Sun
- Joseph McClellan (1746–1834), Continental Army captain, brevet colonel of militia, and Pennsylvania State Senator
- Charles Follen McKim (1847–1909), one of the most prominent American Beaux-Arts architects of the late nineteenth century
- Joseph McMinn (1758–1824), politician who served as Speaker of the Tennessee Senate and 4th Governor of Tennessee
- Thomas Harrison Montgomery Jr. (1873–1912), zoologist and expert in cell biology, invertebrates, and birds
- George Foot Moore (1851–1931), historian of religion, minister, and professor at Andover Theological Seminary and Harvard University
- Hezekiah Niles (1777–1839), editor and publisher of the Weekly Register, one of the highest circulating papers in the United States
- John Grubb Parke, Union general during the American Civil War and victor of the Battle of Fort Stedman (1865)
- Herb Pennock (1894–1948), Hall of Fame baseball pitcher; also known as the "Squire of Kennett Square"
- Elijah F. Pennypacker (1804–1888), abolitionist and Underground Railroad station master
- George Morris Philips (1851–1920), principal of West Chester University from 1881 to 1920
- Evan Pugh (1828–1864), agricultural chemist and first president of Pennsylvania State University
- Thomas Buchanan Read (1822–1872), poet and portrait painter
- George W. Roberts (1833–1862), Union Army colonel killed in action at the Battle of Stones River
- Barclay Rubincam (1920–1978), regionalist painter affiliated with the Brandywine School
- Bayard Rustin (1912–1987), civil rights leader posthumously awarded the Presidential Medal of Freedom
- Matt Ryan (born 1985), NFL quarterback formerly for the Atlanta Falcons and Indianapolis Colts
- Maria Sanford (1836–1920), Chester County school superintendent; professor at Swarthmore College and the University of Minnesota
- John Wallace Scott (1832–1903), Medal of Honor recipient during the Civil War
- Isaac Sharpless (1848–1920), president of Haverford College
- M. Night Shyamalan (born 1970), film director
- William Thomas Smedley (1858–1920), artist; member of the National Academy of Design
- James Smith (1719–1806), signer to the United States Declaration of Independence
- Kerr Smith (born 1972), actor
- William Preston Snyder (1851–1920), president pro tempore of the Pennsylvania Senate and Pennsylvania Auditor General
- Bayard Taylor (1825–1878), poet, novelist, and travel writer
- Joseph Henry Taylor (1844–1908), author, newspaper editor, and frontiersman
- Miles Teller (born 1987), actor
- Martha Gibbons Thomas (1869–1942), first woman elected to the Pennsylvania House of Representatives from Chester County
- Richard Thomas (1744–1832), Pennsylvania state senator, U.S. Representative, and colonel during the American Revolutionary War
- Richard Troxell, international opera star, aka "America's Tenor"
- Bernardhus Van Leer (1687–1790), German-American physician and centenarian
- Samuel Van Leer (1747–1825), captain during the American Revolution; owned Reading Furnace and other nearby historical places
- Anthony Wayne (1745–1796), Revolutionary War general known as "Mad Anthony" Wayne
- George Alexis Weymouth (1936–2016), artist (painter); "whip" stager; founder of the Brandywine Conservancy and the Brandywine River Museum
- Thomas Wharton Jr. (1735–1778), served as the first President of Pennsylvania (an office akin to Governor) following the Declaration of Independence
- William H. Whyte (1917–1999), urbanist and sociologist who coined the term "groupthink" and wrote The Organization Man bestselling book on management
- James P. Wickersham (1825–1891), principal of Millersville State Normal School, state school superintendent, and chargé d'affaires in Denmark
- Hugh Williamson (1735–1819), Founding Father, signatory of the U.S. Constitution, and US representative from North Carolina
- William (Amos) Wilson (1762–1821), folklore figure known as "The Pennsylvania Hermit"
- Andrew Wyeth (1917–2009), artist
- Jamie Wyeth (born 1946), artist
- N. C. Wyeth (1882–1945), artist and illustrator

== See also ==
- Duffy's Cut
- National Register of Historic Places listings in Chester County, Pennsylvania
