= Honey Brook Township, Pennsylvania =

Township in Pennsylvania, US

Honey Brook Township
- Township
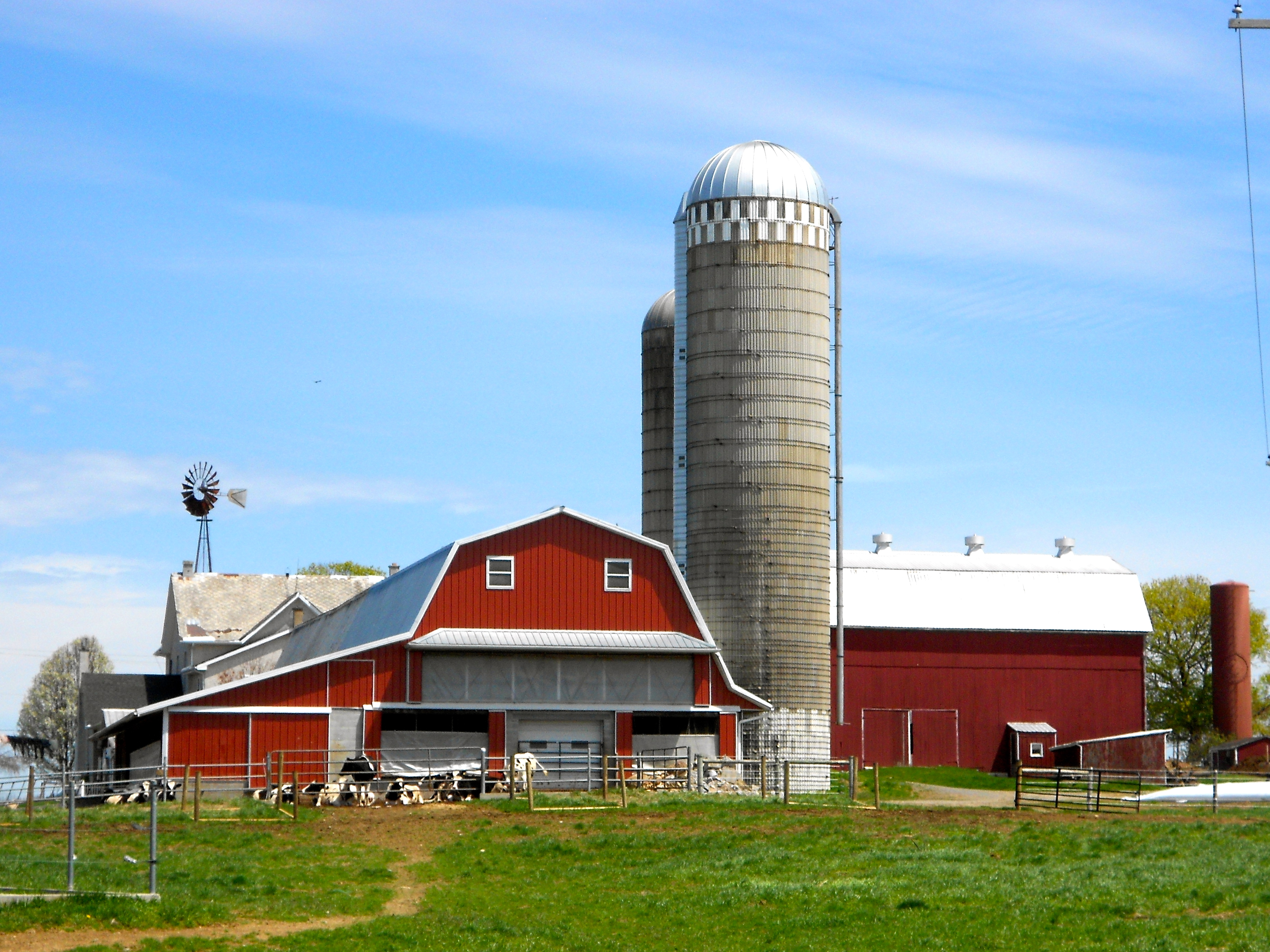
- Farm on Pleasant View Rd.

- Location of Honey Brook Township in Chester County, Pennsylvania and of Chester County in Pennsylvania

- Location of Pennsylvania in the United States
- Coordinates: 40°07′36″N 75°52′35″W
- Country: United States
- State: Pennsylvania
- County: Chester
- Founded: 1789

Area
  - Total: 25.17 sq mi (65.20 km^{2})
  - Land: 24.75 sq mi (64.11 km^{2})
  - Water: 0.42 sq mi (1.10 km^{2})
- Elevation: 879 ft (268 m)

Population (2020)
  - Total: 8,274
  - Density: 334.3/sq mi (129.1/km^{2})
- Time zone: UTC-5 (EST)
  - Summer (DST): UTC-4 (EDT)
- Area code: 610
- FIPS code: 42-029-35536
- Website: www.honeybrooktwp.com

Honey Brook Township is a township in Chester County, Pennsylvania, United States. The population was 8,274 at the time of the 2020 census.

== Geography ==
According to the U.S. Census Bureau, the township has a total area of 25.4 square miles (66 km^{2}), of which 25.1 square miles (65 km^{2}) is land and 0.3 square miles (0.78 km^{2}), or 1.14%, is water. The headwaters of the Brandywine River start in Honey Brook Township, which is a part of the Brandywine River Tidal Basin. Honey Brook Township is also a part of the Pequea Creek Tidal Basin. Nearly two-thirds of the land is in agricultural use.

== Education ==
The school district is Twin Valley School District.

Honey Brook Elementary Center is in the township. Twin Valley Middle School and Twin Valley High School are in Caernarvon Township, Berks County, and have Elverson postal addresses.

== Demographics ==
Historical population
Census	Pop.	Note	%±
1930	1,140		—
1940	1,171		2.7%
1950	1,261		7.7%
1960	1,584		25.6%
1970	2,883		82.0%
1980	4,128		43.2%
1990	5,449		32.0%
2000	6,278		15.2%
2010	7,647		21.8%
2020	8,274		8.2%
2020

At the 2010 census, the township was 95.4% non-Hispanic White, 1.7% Hispanic or Latino, 1.1% Black or African American, 0.2% Asian, 0.1% Native Hawaiian or other Pacific Islander, and 3.2% were two or more races.

At the 2000 census, there were 6,278 people, 2,054 households, and 1,554 families living in the township. The population density was 250.0 inhabitants per square mile (96.5/km^{2}). There were 2,134 housing units at an average density of 85.0 per square mile (32.8/km^{2}). The racial makeup of the township was 97.40% White, 1.08% African American, 0.99% Hispanic or Latino of any race, 0.24% Native American, 0.19% Asian, 0.03% Pacific Islander, 0.29% from other races, and 0.76% from two or more races.

There were 2,054 households, 38.7% had children under the age of 18 living with them, 63.5% were married couples living together, 7.8% had a female householder with no husband present, and 24.3% were non-families. 20.5% of households were made up of individuals, and 11.8% were one person aged 65 or older. The average household size was 2.90 and the average family size was 3.37.

The age distribution was 29.0% under the age of 18, 7.5% from 18 to 24, 27.5% from 25 to 44, 19.2% from 45 to 64, and 16.8% 65 or older. The median age was 36 years. For every 100 females, there were 90.7 males. For every 100 females age 18 and over, there were 83.8 males.

The median household income was $50,609 and the median family income was $57,500. Males had a median income of $40,970 versus $28,404 for females. The per capita income for the township was $19,046. About 5.2% of families and 6.8% of the population were below the poverty line, including 6.2% of those under age 18 and 19.5% of those age 65 or over.

Honey Brook Township is home to an Amish community, which comprises half of the township's population.

== Transportation ==
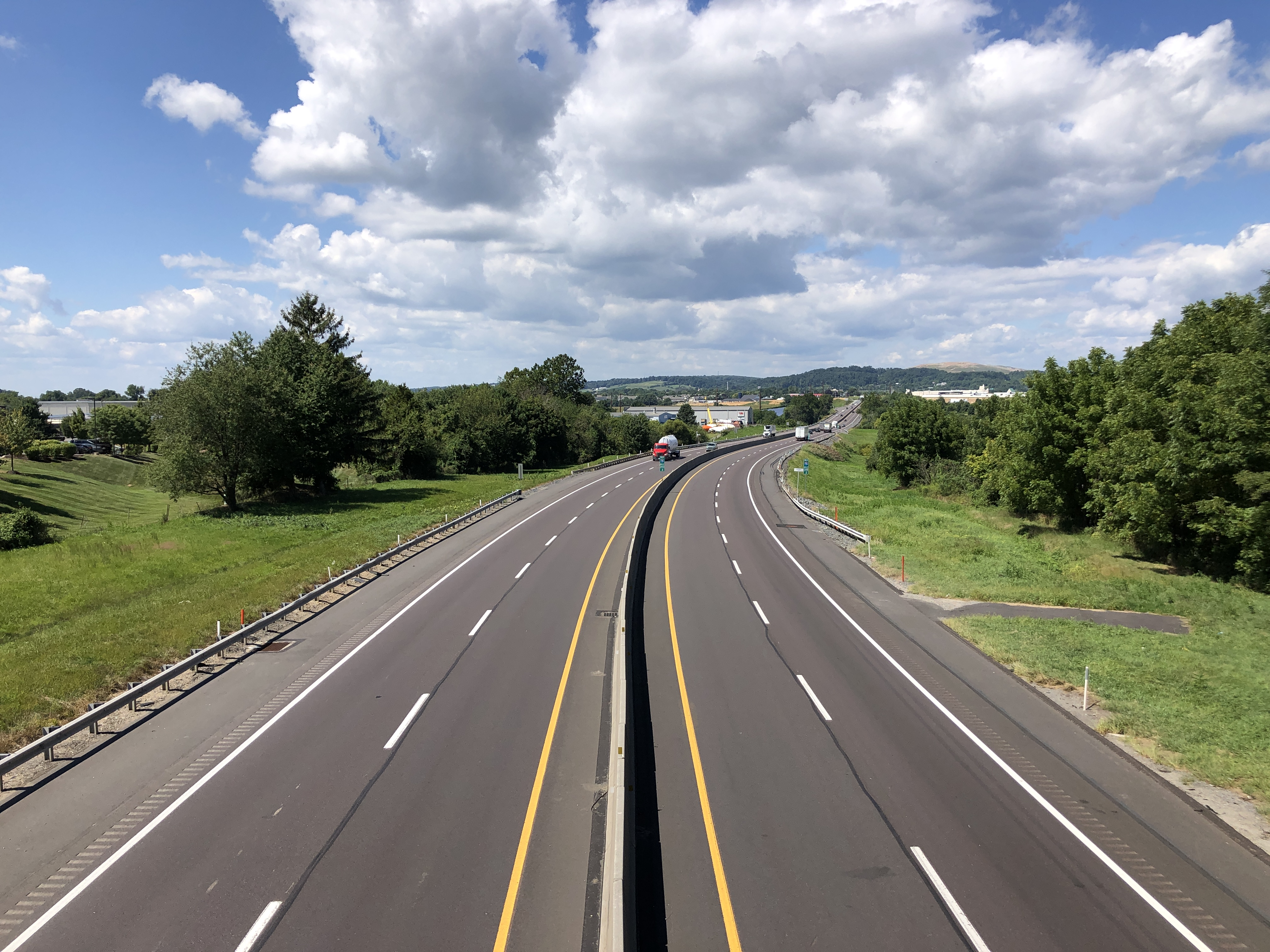
Pennsylvania Turnpike/I-76 westbound in Honey Brook Township

As of 2018, there were 72.45 miles (116.60 km) of public roads in Honey Brook Township, of which 0.10 miles (0.16 km) were maintained by the Pennsylvania Turnpike Commission (PTC), 20.58 miles (33.12 km) were maintained by the Pennsylvania Department of Transportation (PennDOT) and 51.77 miles (83.32 km) were maintained by the township.

A very short segment of the Pennsylvania Turnpike (I-76) crosses the northern tip of Honey Brook Township, but the closest interchange is at Interstate 176 and Pennsylvania Route 10 in neighboring Caernarvon Township. PA 10 heads southward across western portions of Honey Brook Township via Twin County Road and Compass Road. U.S. Route 322 follows Horseshoe Pike along a northwest–southeast alignment through the center of the township.
