= West Brandywine Township, Pennsylvania =

Township in Pennsylvania, US

West Brandywine Township
- Township
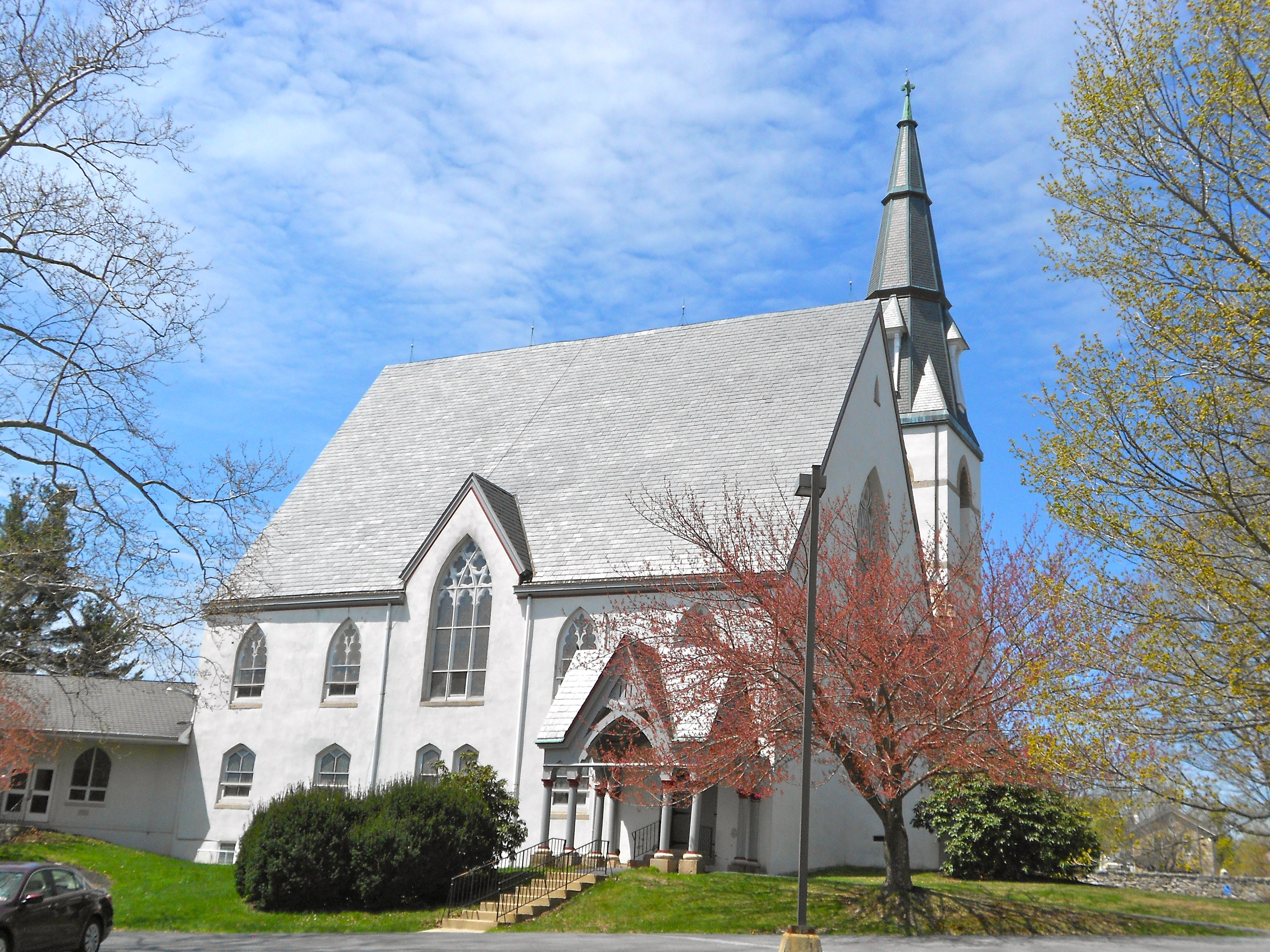
- Forks of the Brandywine Presbyterian Church

- Location of West Brandywine Township in Chester County and in Pennsylvania

- Location of Pennsylvania in the United States
- Coordinates: 40°03′37″N 75°48′53″W
- Country: United States
- State: Pennsylvania
- County: Chester

Area
  - Total: 13.25 sq mi (34.33 km^{2})
  - Land: 13.12 sq mi (33.98 km^{2})
  - Water: 0.14 sq mi (0.36 km^{2})
- Elevation: 748 ft (228 m)

Population (2010)
  - Total: 7,394
  - Estimate (2016): 7,444
  - Density: 567.4/sq mi (219.09/km^{2})
- Time zone: UTC-5 (EST)
  - Summer (DST): UTC-4 (EDT)
- Area code: 610
- FIPS code: 42-029-82576
- Website: www.wbrandywine.org

West Brandywine Township is a township that is located in Chester County, Pennsylvania, United States. The population was 7,394 at the time of the 2010 census.

== History ==
The Hatfield-Hibernia Historic District was listed on the National Register of Historic Places in 1984.

Per the township government's logo, the township was incorporated in 1844. West Brandywine Township

== Geography ==
According to the United States Census Bureau, the township has a total area of 13.4 square miles (35 km^{2}), of which 0.04 square miles (0.10 km^{2}), or 0.22%, is water.

== Demographics ==
Historical population
Census	Pop.	Note	%±
1930	738		—
1940	776		5.1%
1950	1,122		44.6%
1960	1,675		49.3%
1970	2,713		62.0%
1980	4,068		49.9%
1990	5,984		47.1%
2000	7,153		19.5%
2010	7,394		3.4%
2020	7,331		−0.9%

At the time of the 2010 census, the township was 92.0% non-Hispanic White, 3.5% Black or African American, 0.1% Native American, 0.9% Asian, and 1.0% of residents defined themselves as being of two or more races. 2.6% of the population were of Hispanic or Latino ancestry.

As of the census of 2000, there were 7,153 people, 2,552 households, and 2,003 families living in the township.

The population density was 534.5 inhabitants per square mile (206.4/km^{2}). There were 2,610 housing units at an average density of 195.0 per square mile (75.3/km^{2}).

The racial makeup of the township was 95.39% White, 3.27% African American, 0.14% Native American, 0.39% Asian, 0.27% from other races, and 0.55% from two or more races. Hispanic or Latino of any race were 0.70% of the population.

There were 2,552 households, out of which 38.4% had children who were under the age of eighteen living with them, 68.8% were married couples living together, 6.0% had a female householder with no husband present, and 21.5% were non-families. Of all of the households that were documented, 17.6% were made up of individuals, and 8.7% had someone living alone who was sixty-five years of age or older.

The average household size was 2.78 and the average family size was 3.17.

Within the township, the population was spread out, with 27.1% of residents who were under the age of 18, 5.6% from 18 to 24, 30.1% from 25 to 44, 23.6% from 45 to 64, and 13.7% who were 65 years of age or older. The median age was 39 years.

For every one hundred females, there were 97.1 males. For every one hundred females who were aged eighteen or older, there were 94.2 males.

The median income for a household in the township was $62,500, and the median income for a family was $69,514. Males had a median income of $46,558 compared with that of $31,362 for females.

The per capita income for the township was $25,211.

Approximately 2.6% of families and 3.7% of the population were living below the poverty line, including 4.6% of those who were under the age of eighteen and 1.0% of those who were aged sixty-five or older.

== Transportation ==
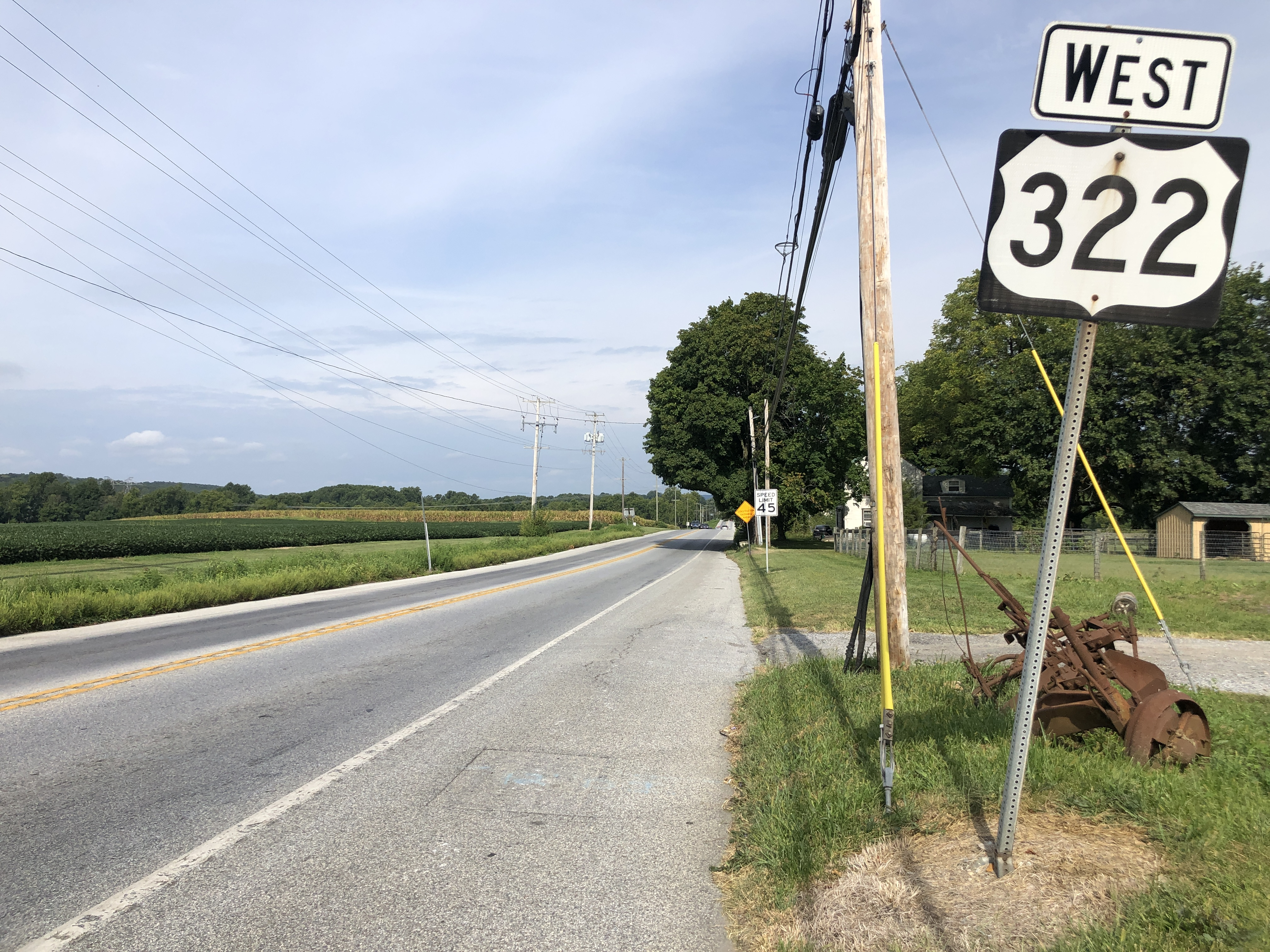
US 322 westbound in West Brandywine Township

As of 2018, there were 60.21 miles (96.90 km) of public roads in West Brandywine Township, of which 21.08 miles (33.92 km) were maintained by the Pennsylvania Department of Transportation (PennDOT) and 39.13 miles (62.97 km) were maintained by the township.

U.S. Route 322, Pennsylvania Route 82, and Pennsylvania Route 340 are the numbered roads serving West Brandywine Township. US 322 follows Horseshoe Pike along a northwest–southeast alignment across the northern and eastern portions of the township. PA 82 follows South Manor Road along a north–south alignment through the middle of the township. PA 340 follows Kings Highway along an east–west alignment along the southern border of the township.

== Education ==
The school district is Coatesville Area School District. The district's comprehensive high school is Coatesville Area Senior High School.
