= Kelton, Pennsylvania =

Unincorporated community in Pennsylvania, US

- Unincorporated community
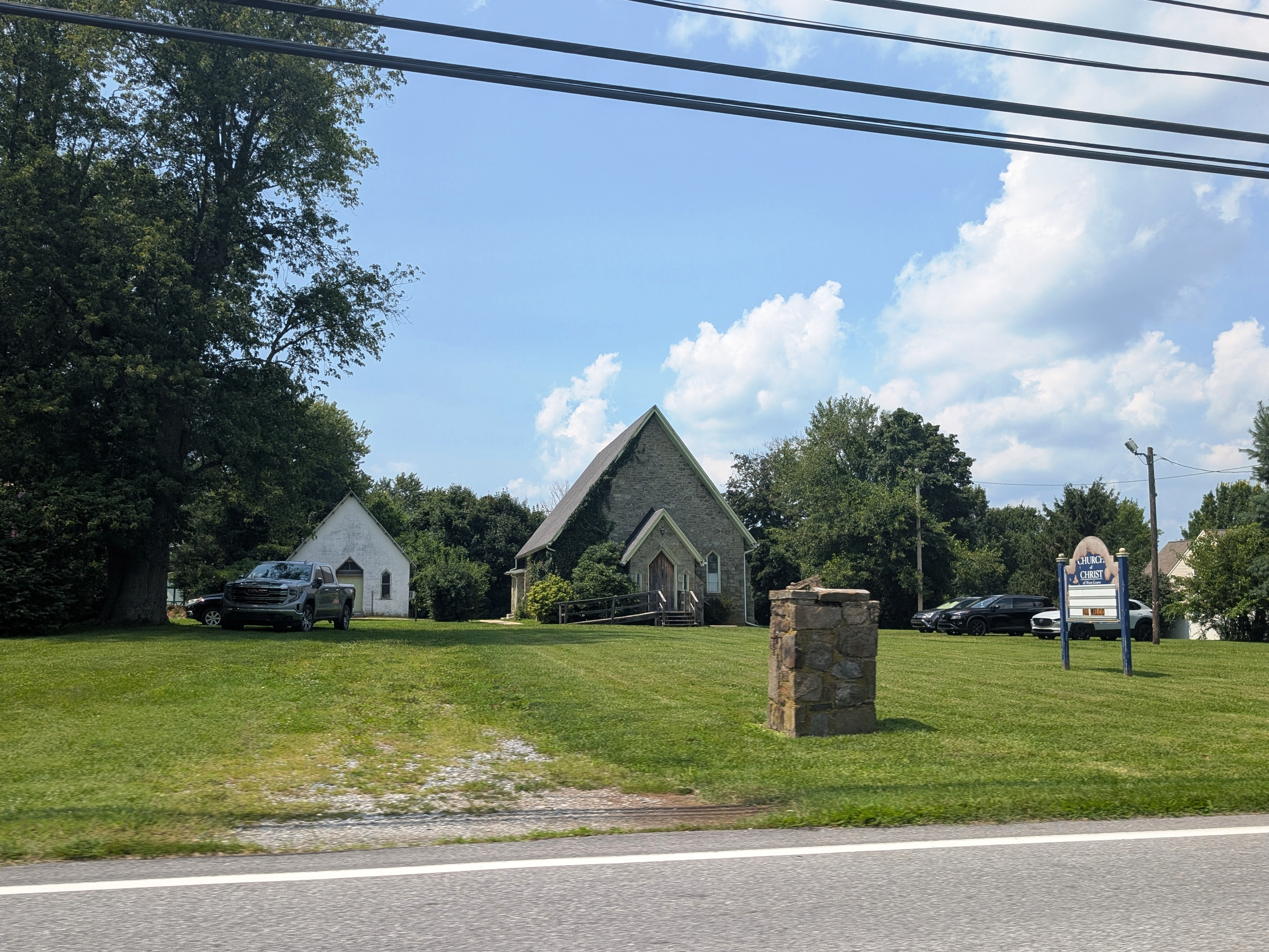
- Church of Christ of West Grove in Kelton

- Location within Pennsylvania Location within the United States
- Coordinates: 39°48′31″N 75°52′41″W
- Country: United States
- State: Pennsylvania
- County: Chester
- Township: Penn
- Elevation: 571 ft (174 m)
- Time zone: UTC-5 (Eastern (EST))
  - Summer (DST): UTC-4 (EDT)
- ZIP code: 19346
- Area codes: 610 and 484
- GNIS feature ID: 1203925

Kelton is an unincorporated community in Penn Township in Chester County, Pennsylvania, United States. Kelton is located at the intersection of Pennsylvania Route 796 and Kelton Road.
