= Pennsylvania Route 796 =

State highway in Chester County, Pennsylvania, US

Pennsylvania Route 796

Route information
- Maintained by PennDOT
- Length: 5.784 mi (9.308 km)

Major junctions
- South end: PA 896 in New London Township
- US 1 in Penn Township; PA 926 in Londonderry Township
- North end: PA 41 in Londonderry Township

Location
- Country: United States
- State: Pennsylvania
- Counties: Chester

Highway system
- Pennsylvania State Route System; Interstate; US; State; Scenic; Legislative
← PA 791	→ PA 802

Pennsylvania Route 796 (PA 796) is a state highway in Chester County, Pennsylvania. The route runs 5.8 miles (9.3 km) from PA 896 in New London Township north to PA 41 in Londonderry Township. PA 796 heads through rural areas with some development along its route. In Jennersville, the route crosses Baltimore Pike and has an interchange with the U.S. Route 1 (US 1) freeway. PA 796 crosses PA 926 a short distance south of its northern terminus. PA 796 was originally designated by 1930 between the Maryland border near Kemblesville and north of Jennersville. In 1937, the southern terminus was moved to its current location, with PA 896 replacing the route south to the Maryland border, while the northern end was extended to PA 926 by 1940. PA 796 was extended north to PA 41 in the 1940s.

== Route description ==
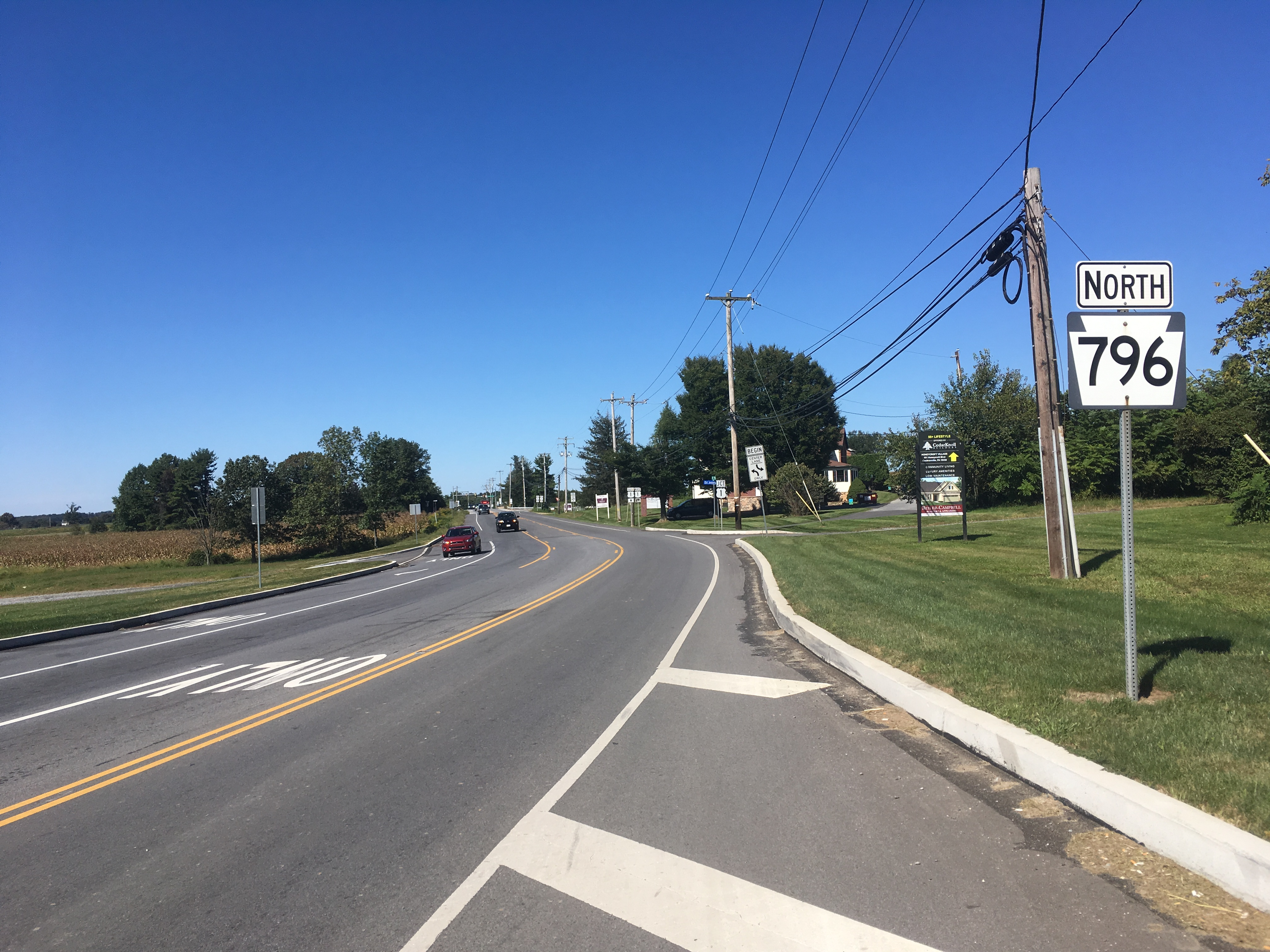
PA 796 northbound past Baltimore Pike in Jennersville

PA 796 begins at an intersection with PA 896 in New London Township, Chester County, heading north on two-lane undivided Jennersville Road. The route soon crosses into Penn Township and curves northeast through a mix of fields and woods with some development. In the residential community of Kelton, PA 796 comes to a bridge over an East Penn Railroad line. The road continues north and passes residential neighborhoods and commercial establishments along with some farms. PA 796 reaches the community of Jennersville, where it gains a center left-turn lane and crosses Baltimore Pike. The route comes to an interchange with the US 1 freeway a short distance later. Following this, the road narrows back to two lanes and heads north through agricultural areas with some woods and homes. PA 796 enters Londonderry Township and curves northwest. The route curves north again and crosses PA 926. PA 796 heads to its northern terminus at PA 41. Past this intersection, the road continues as Derry Meeting Road, which is an unsigned quadrant route designated State Route 3041.

== History ==
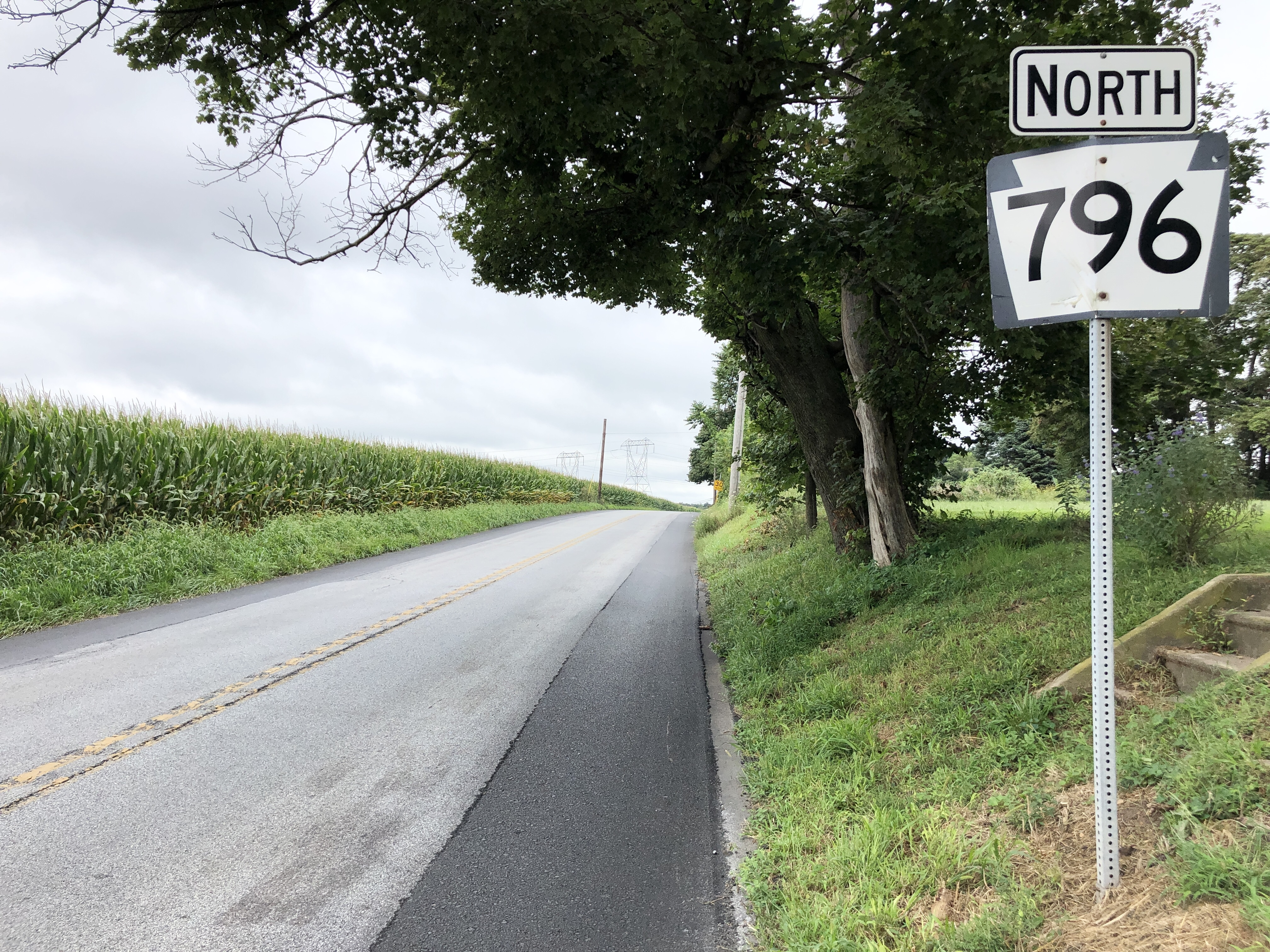
PA 796 northbound in Londonderry Township

When Pennsylvania first legislated routes in 1911, present-day PA 796 was not legislated as part of any route. By 1928, the current route of PA 796 was paved between the southern terminus and north of Jennersville; at this time it did not carry a route number. By 1930, PA 796 was designated to run from the Maryland border southeast of Kemblesville north to a point north of Jennersville, heading through Kemblesville and New London before picking up its current alignment. In 1937, the southern terminus was cut back to its current location, with an extended PA 896 replacing the route south of that point. By 1940, the northern terminus was extended to PA 926 along a newly paved road. The route was extended north to PA 41 along a paved road during the 1940s. By 1970, the interchange with the US 1 freeway was built, with the route having previously intersected US 1 at the Baltimore Pike intersection.

== Major intersections ==
The entire route is in Chester County.

Location	mi	km	Destinations	Notes
New London Township	0.000	0.000	PA 896 (Newark Road)	Southern terminus
Penn Township	2.366	3.808	US 1 (Kennett–Oxford Bypass)	Interchange
Londonderry Township	5.335	8.586	PA 926 (Street Road)	
Londonderry Township	5.784	9.308	PA 41 (Gap Newport Pike)	Northern terminus
1.000 mi = 1.609 km; 1.000 km = 0.621 mi
