= Gustine Lake =

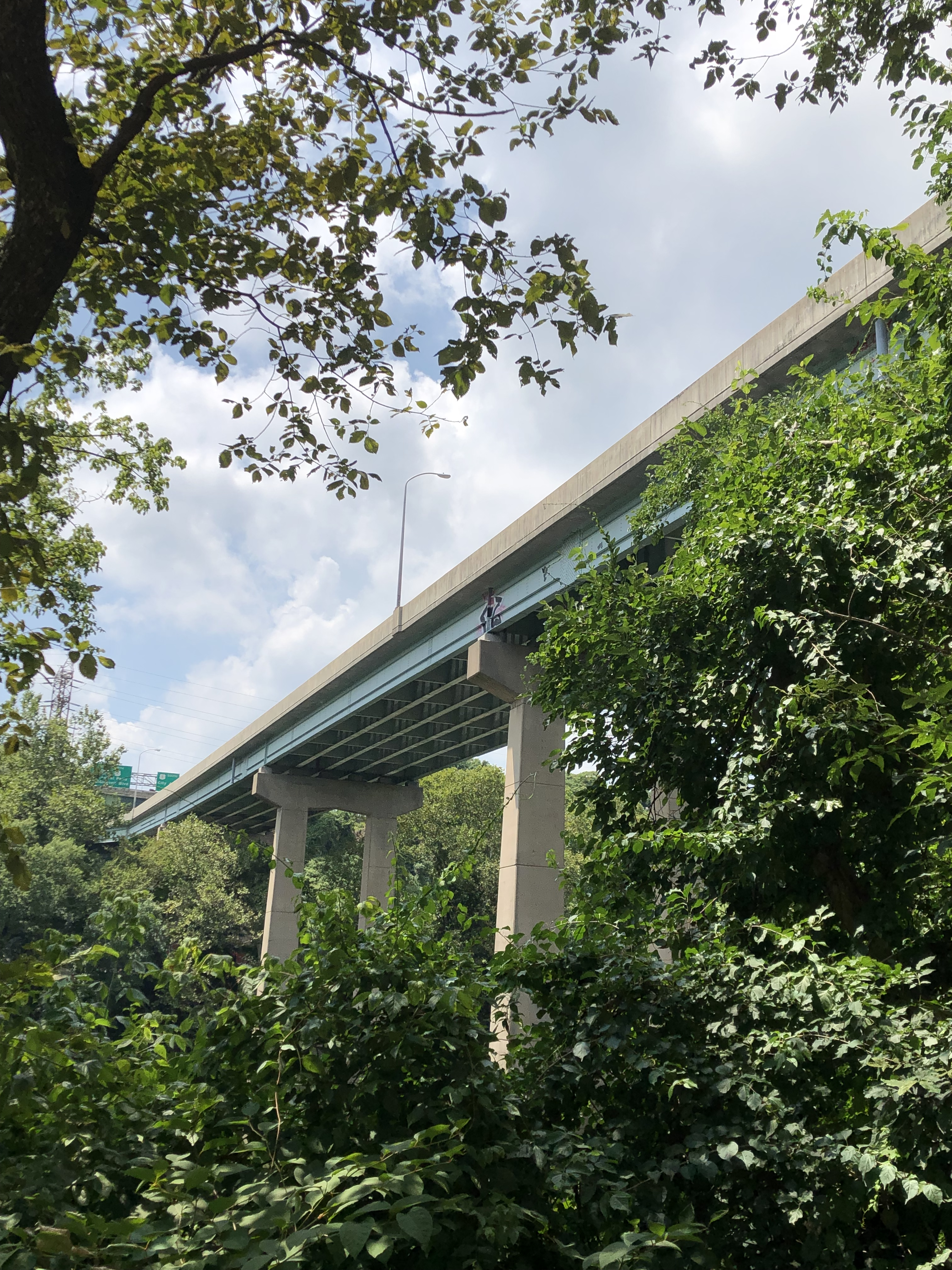
- The City Avenue Bridges roughly goes over the area that was once Gustine Lake

- Location within Philadelphia Location within Pennsylvania Location within the United States
- Interactive map of Gustine Lake
- Location: Lower Northwest, Philadelphia, Pennsylvania
- Coordinates: 40.01372°N 75.20460°W
- Type: Former lake
- Basin countries: United States
- Surface elevation: 36 feet (11 m)
- Settlements: East Falls, Philadelphia
- References: U.S. Geological Survey Geographic Names Information System: Gustine Lake

Gustine Lake was a small, man-made lake located in the East Falls section of Northwest Philadelphia. Today, it is the site of the Gustine Lake Interchange, located between Kelly Drive and U.S. Route 1. As late as 1954, this lake was part of the Wissahickon Valley Park.
