= City Avenue Bridges =

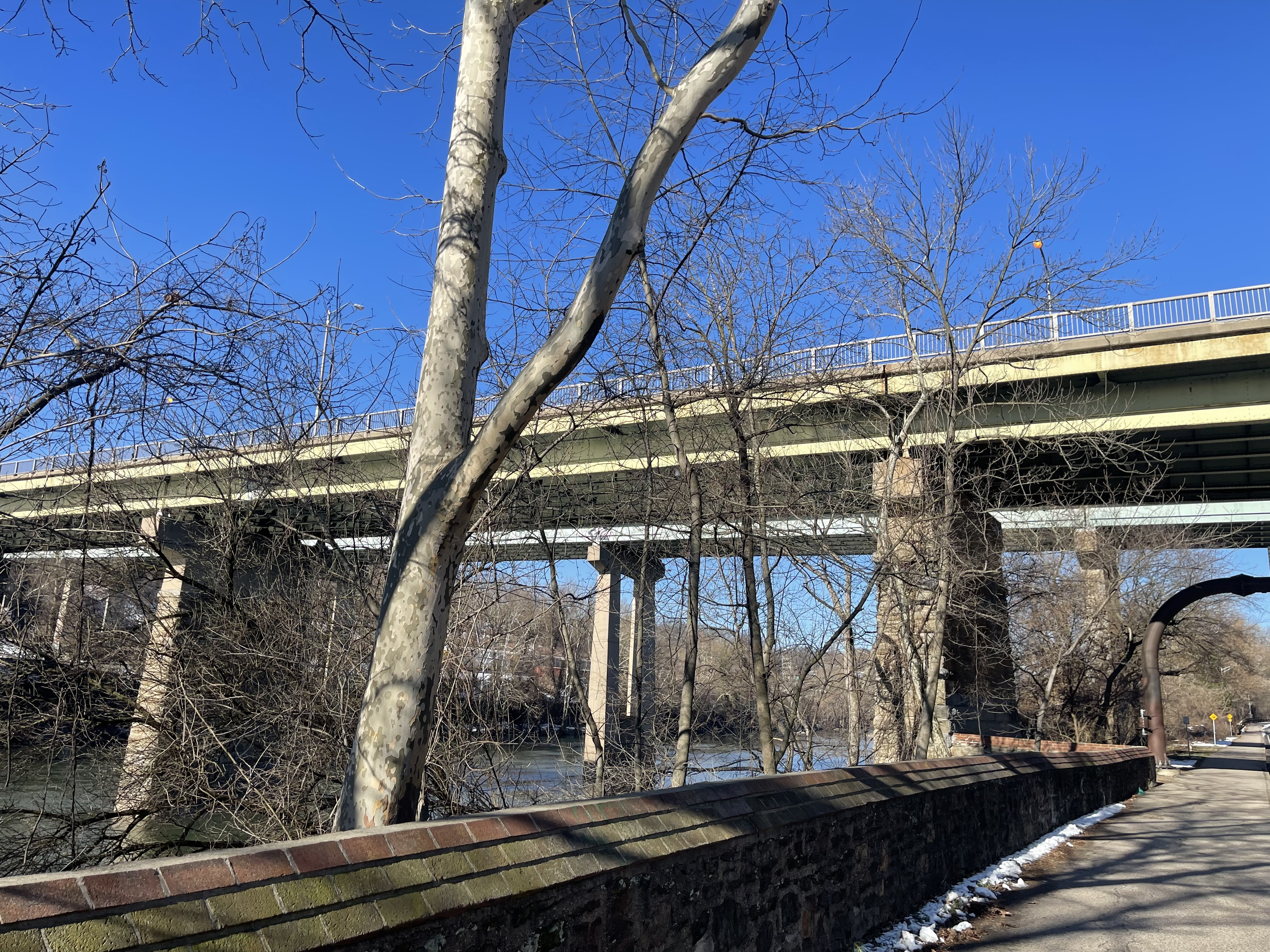
- City Avenue Bridges
- Coordinates: 40°00′54″N 75°11′31″W
- Carries: City Avenue
- Crosses: Schuylkill River
- Locale: Philadelphia, Pennsylvania
- Owner: Pennsylvania Department of Transportation

Characteristics
- Material: Steel, concrete

History
- Opened: 1955

The City Avenue Bridges are twin bridges that span the Schuylkill River in Philadelphia, Pennsylvania. Although the bridges carry the eastbound and westbound lanes of City Avenue, the bridges are not signed with the U.S. Route 1 designation. The bridges directly connect the Schuylkill Expressway to Lincoln Drive, Kelly Drive, and Ridge Avenue via the Gustine Lake interchange.

== Gallery ==
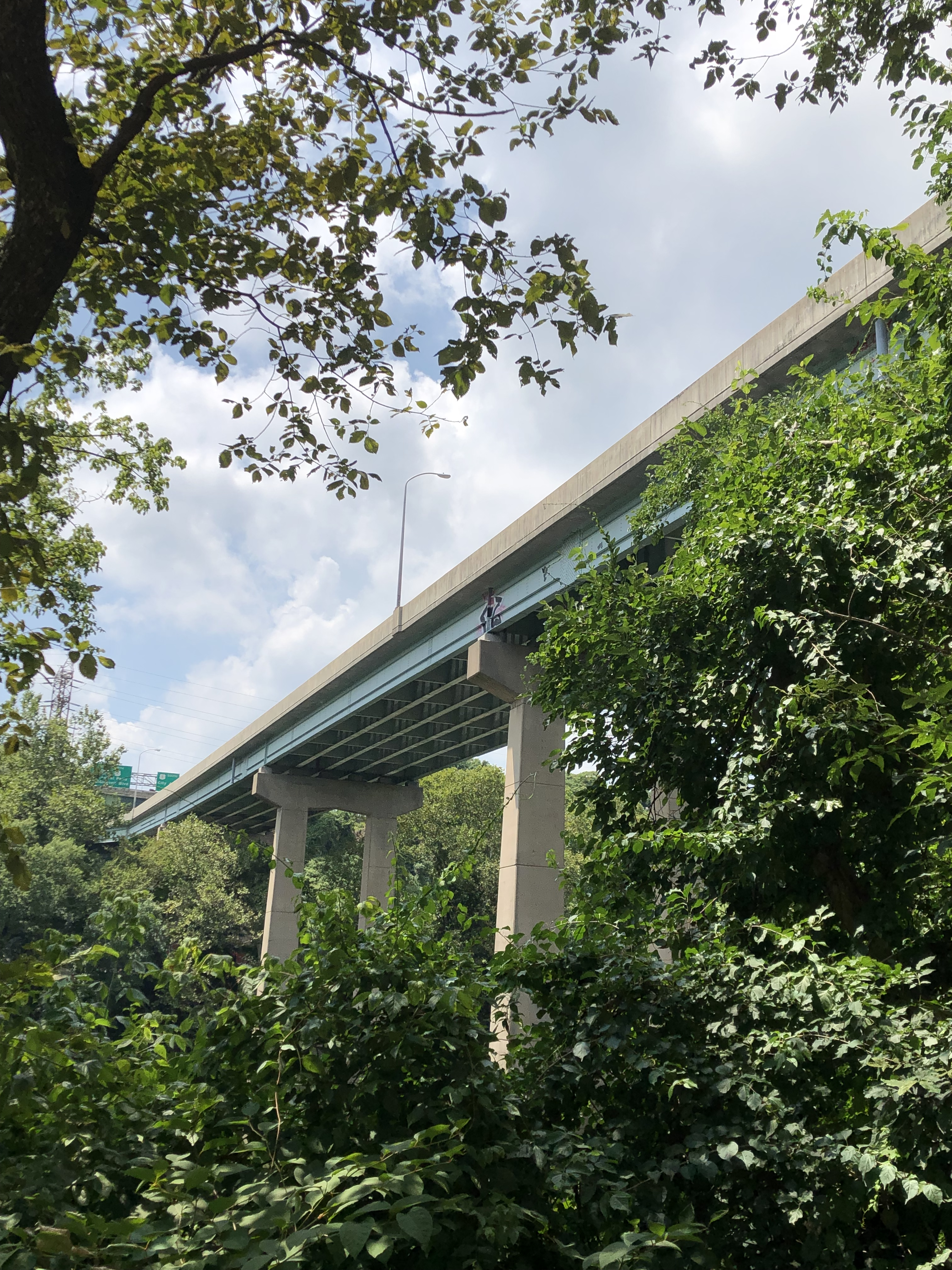
View of bridge from Kelly Drive

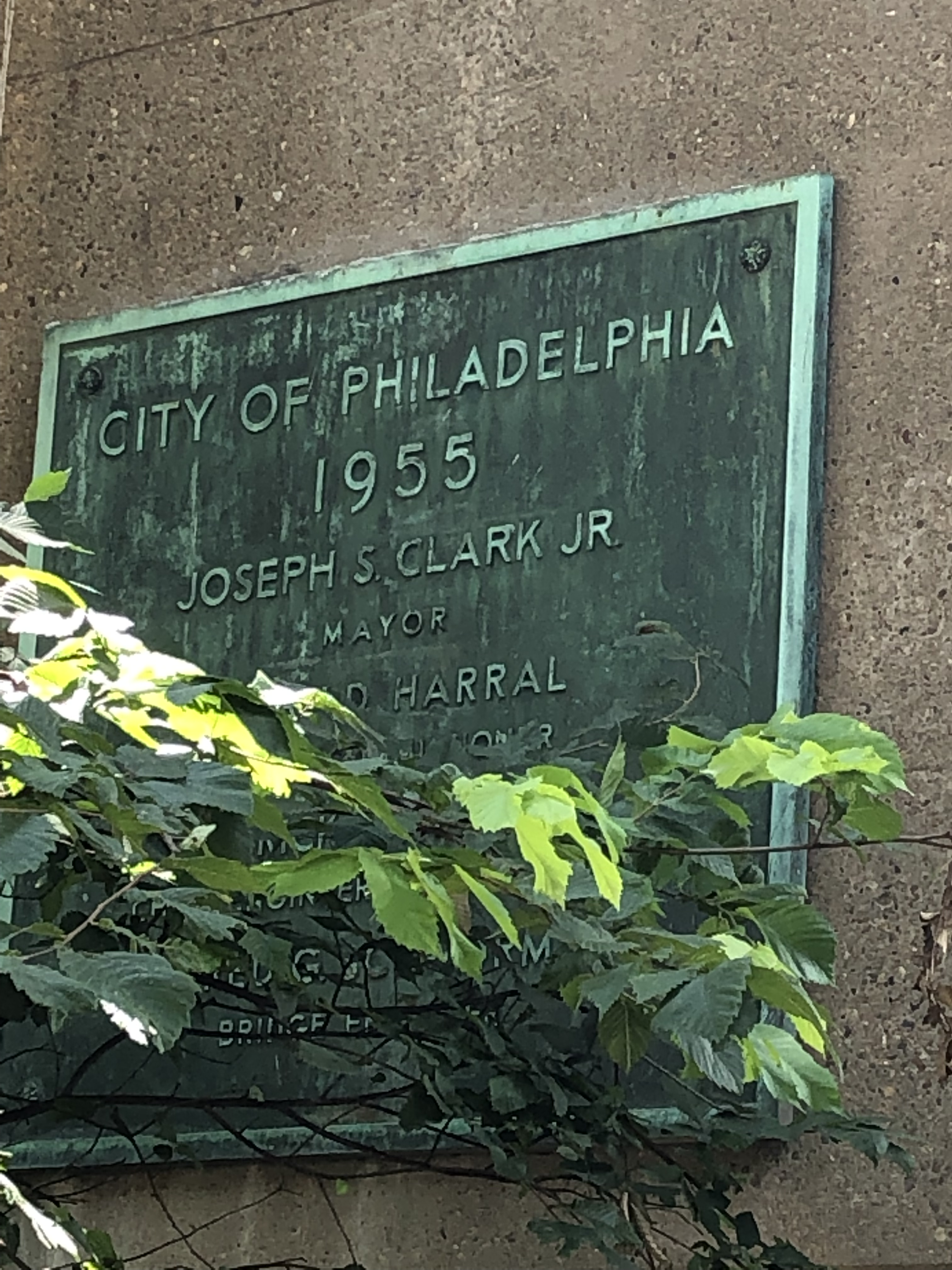
Plaque

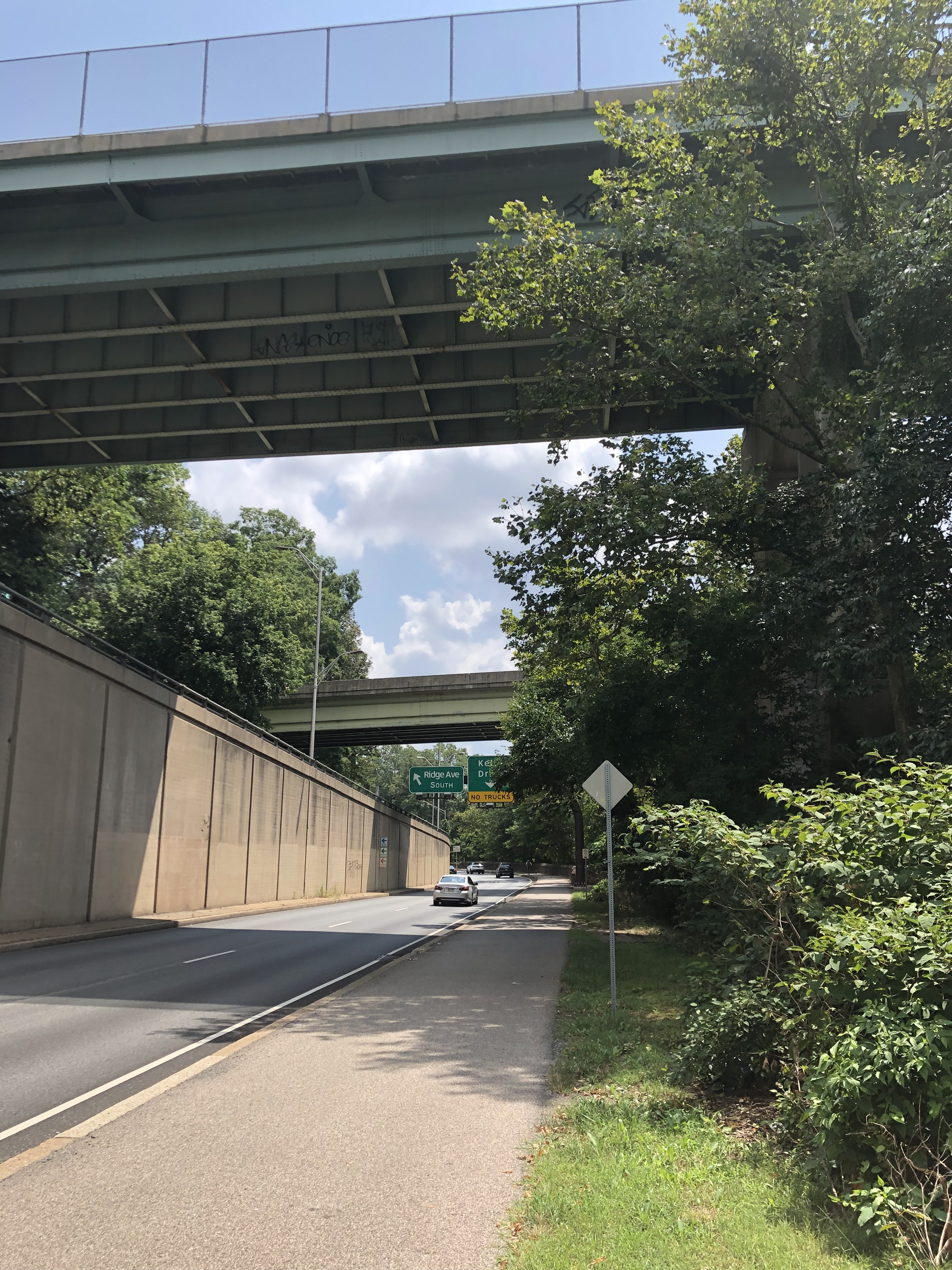
Looking south on Ridge Pike

== See also ==
- List of crossings of the Schuylkill River
