= Eva Griffith Thompson =

American newspaper editor

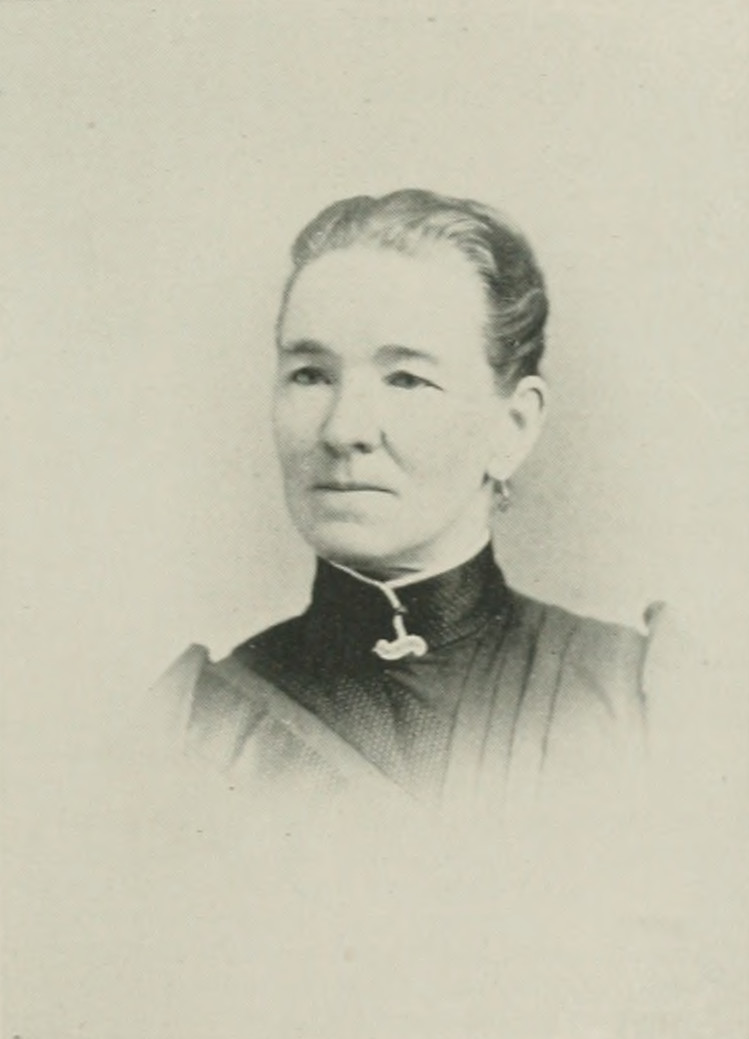
- Photo in A Woman of the Century
- Born: Eva Griffith; June 30, 1842; Jennersville, Pennsylvania, U.S.
- Died: February 6, 1925 (aged 82); Trafford, Pennsylvania, U.S.
- Resting place: Oakland Cemetery and Mausoleum, in Indiana, Pennsylvania, U.S.
- Occupation: newspaper editor
- Spouses: Andrew B. Allison (m. 1861; died 1862); Sylvester C. Thompson (m. 1867; died 1912)
- Writing career
- Pen name: Eva G.
- Language: English

Eva Griffith Thompson (née, Griffith; pen name, Eva G.; June 30, 1842 – February 6, 1925) was an American newspaper editor who conducted the Indiana Times, the Indiana Messenger, and the News, of Indiana, Pennsylvania. First married and widowed while quite young during the American Civil War, she finished her education at the Steubenville Female Seminary before teaching for many years in Indiana County schools, and serving as the county's deputy superintendent of schools. She was affiliated with the Woman's Christian Temperance Union (WCTU) movement and was embraced by the Grand Army of the Republic, her second husband having been a member of the organization. Thompson served as president of the Presbyterian Home Missionary Society.

== Early life and education ==
Eva Griffith was born near Jennersville, Pennsylvania, June 30, 1842. Her father, Abner Griffith, a Quaker, died at the age of seventy-two. Her mother, Eliza Cooper Griffith, was Scotch-Irish. She had at least three siblings, a brother, Charles, and sisters, Rebecca and Tabitha. The family later removed to East Mahoning Township, Indiana County, Pennsylvania.

Thompson attended schools in the township, and was further educated by reading periodicals and other volumes of literature.

== Career ==
In 1861, at the beginning of the civil war, she married Andrew B. Allison, who joined the Union Army, serving as a member of Company A, 61st Pennsylvania Infantry Regiment. In six months, on February 18, 1862, she was a widow, at the age of twenty.

She continued her education, and in 1865, was graduated from the Steubenville Female Seminary, run by the Presbyterian Church in Ohio. For many years, she taught in the northern part of the Indiana County, Pennsylvania schools. Samuel Judson Craighead, county superintendent of common schools of Indiana County, appointed her deputy superintendent. That is said to be the first time such an honor was conferred upon a woman.

On October 14, 1867, (Note: Her 1925 obituary in the Indiana Progress records the date of marriage as October 14, 1866.) she married Sylvester C. Thompson (born 1840). After living for a period of time near Kellysburg, Pennsylvania, they removed to Indiana, Pennsylvania.

For years, she held the office of president of the Presbyterian Home Missionary Society. The Grand Army of the Republic men accepted her as a comrade, and in many of their meetings, she was called upon to make an address. At the inauguration of the WCTU movement in Indiana County, she was appointed organizer. In her role as the State superintendent of franchise, she was an aggressive supporter of the Pennsylvania WCTU.

Thompson published the Indiana Times and the Indiana Messenger. As editor and proprietor of the News, Indiana, Pennsylvania, she wrote mostly on behalf of temperance and reform. The paper endorses the People's Party.

== Personal life ==
In religion, Thompson affiliated with the Presbyterian church. Shortly after being widowed again in 1912, she relocated to the home of her daughter and son-in-law in Trafford, Pennsylvania, where she died February 6, 1925. Death was directly due to pneumonia, although her health had not been the best for the last two years when she was weakened by recurrent paralytic shocks. She was buried at Oakland Cemetery and Mausoleum, in Indiana, Pennsylvania. Her sister, Rebecca Jane (Griffith) Wolfe, died less than seven weeks after Thompson's death.
