= U.S. Route 1 in Pennsylvania =

Section of U.S. Route in Pennsylvania

U.S. Route 1
- Map of southeast Pennsylvania with US 1 in red and alternate routes in blue

Route information
- Maintained by PennDOT and DRJTBC
- Length: 80.916 mi (130.222 km)

Major junctions
- South end: US 1 at the Maryland state line near Nottingham
- US 202 / US 322 in Concordville; I-476 near Media; PA 3 in Havertown; US 30 at the Wynnewood–Philadelphia line; I-76 at the Bala Cynwyd–Philadelphia line; US 13 in Philadelphia; PA 63 in Philadelphia; I-276 / Penna Turnpike in Bensalem; I-295 near Langhorne; US 13 / US 1 Bus. in Falls Township
- North end: US 1 at the New Jersey state line in Morrisville

Location
- Country: United States
- State: Pennsylvania
- Counties: Chester, Delaware, Montgomery, Philadelphia, Bucks

Highway system
- United States Numbered Highway System; List; Special; Divided; Pennsylvania State Route System; Interstate; US; State; Scenic; Legislative
← PA 999	→ PA 1

U.S. Route 1 (US 1) is a major north–south U.S. Route, extending from Key West, Florida, in the south to Fort Kent, Maine, at the Canada–United States border in the north. In the U.S. state of Pennsylvania, US 1 runs for 81 miles (130 km) from the Maryland state line near Nottingham northeast to the New Jersey state line at the Delaware River in Morrisville, through the southeastern portion of the state. The route runs southwest to northeast and serves as a major arterial road through the city of Philadelphia and for many of the suburbs in the Philadelphia metropolitan area. South of Philadelphia, the road mostly follows the alignment of the Baltimore Pike. Within Philadelphia, it mostly follows Roosevelt Boulevard. North of Philadelphia, US 1 parallels the route of the Lincoln Highway. Several portions of US 1 in Pennsylvania are freeways, including from near the Maryland state line to Kennett Square, the bypass of Media, the concurrency with Interstate 76 (I-76, Schuylkill Expressway) and the Roosevelt Expressway in Philadelphia, and between Bensalem Township and the New Jersey state line.

== Route description ==
=== Chester County ===
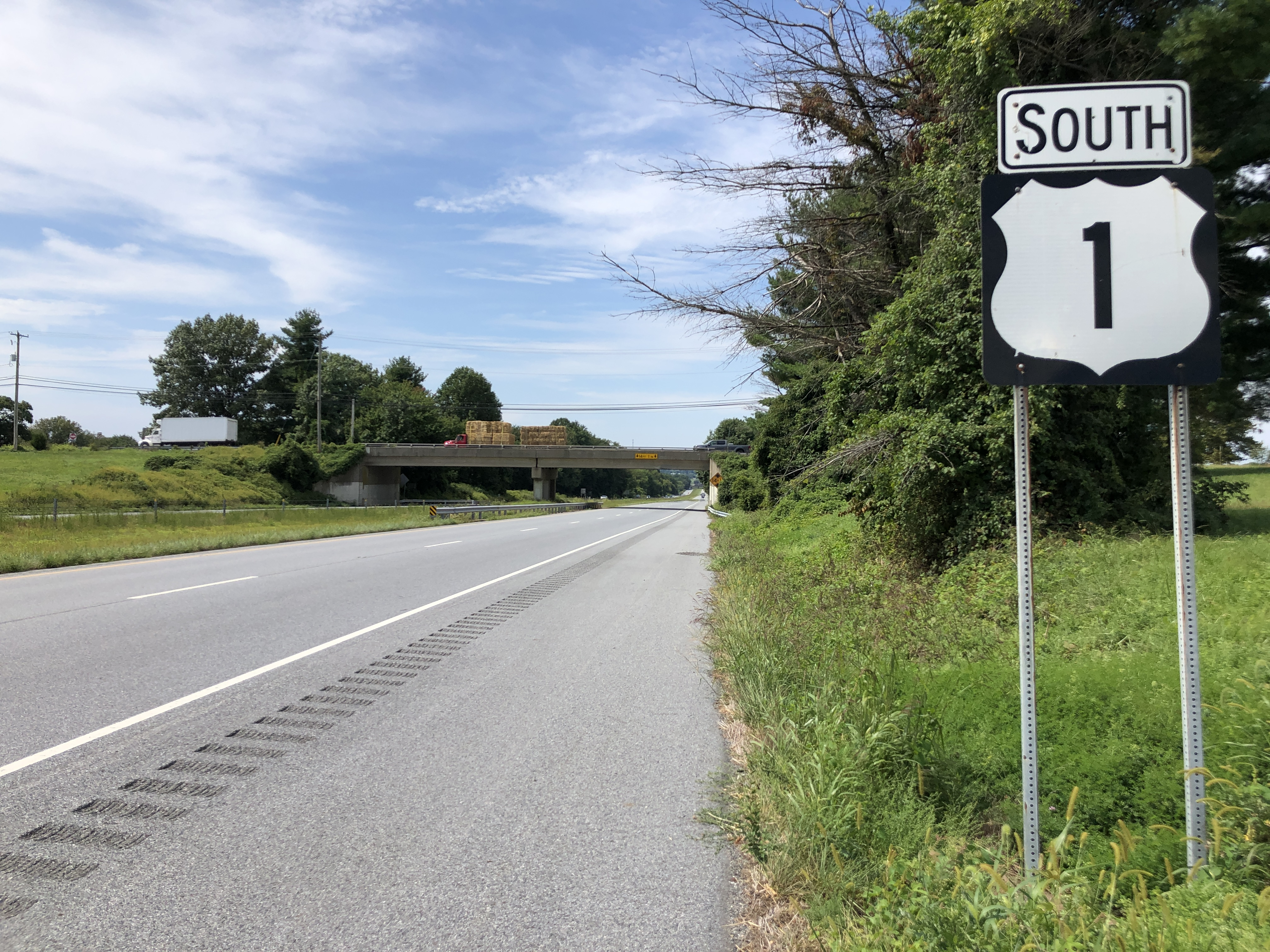
US 1 freeway southbound at the PA 796 interchange in Jennersville

US 1 enters Pennsylvania from Maryland in West Nottingham Township, Chester County, heading northeast as a two-lane undivided road that soon widens into a four-lane divided highway. The road curves north and runs through fields and woods with some development, becoming a four-lane freeway that is called the Kennett–Oxford Bypass and dedicated as the John H. Ware III Memorial Highway. The route runs through rural land with some nearby homes and commercial development, coming to a partial cloverleaf interchange with Pennsylvania Route 272 (PA 272) west of the community of Nottingham. From here, US 1 curves to the northeast and continues into East Nottingham Township, passing through a mix of farmland and woodland with some residences. The freeway skirts into the western portion of the borough of Oxford and reaches a diamond interchange with PA 472 that serves the borough. The route runs through more rural areas with some nearby development and enters Lower Oxford Township, where it bends to the east-northeast and comes to a partial cloverleaf interchange with PA 10 that also provides access to Oxford. US 1 continues through farmfields and woods and crosses the West Branch Big Elk Creek before it heads into Upper Oxford Township, where it has a partial cloverleaf interchange with PA 896.

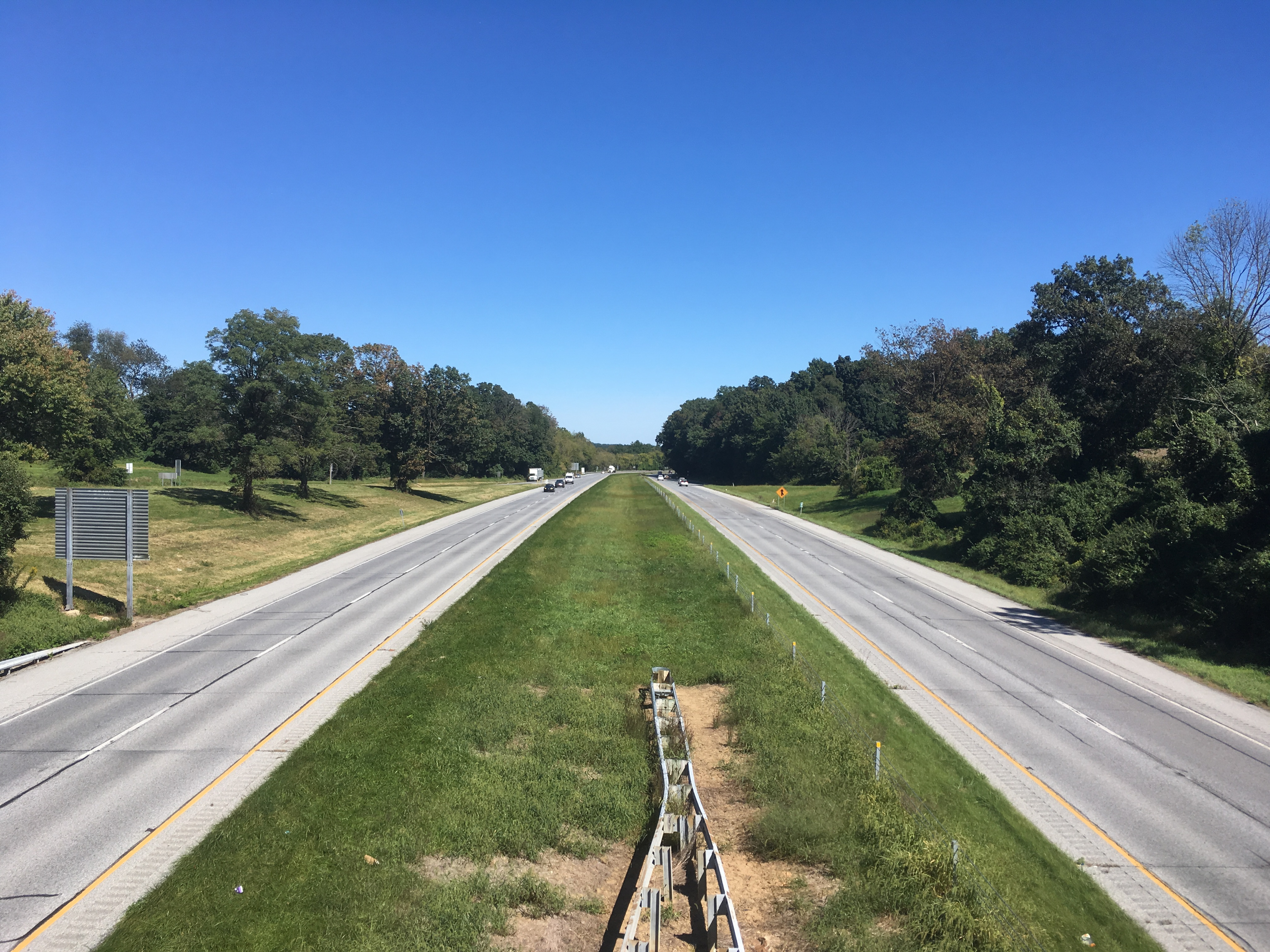
US 1 freeway northbound at the PA 41 interchange in London Grove Township

The freeway crosses Big Elk Creek into Penn Township and heads east to a diamond interchange at PA 796 north of the community of Jennersville. The route passes through a mix of fields, woods, and residential development as it continues east into London Grove Township and crosses Middle Branch White Clay Creek before it comes to a partial cloverleaf interchange at PA 841 north of the borough of West Grove. US 1 curves northeast and reaches a diamond interchange serving PA 41 northwest of the borough of Avondale. The freeway continues through rural land with some development and bends to the east, crossing the East Branch White Clay Creek, heading into New Garden Township, and coming to a partial cloverleaf interchange at Newark Road north of the community of Toughkenamon. The route heads through wooded areas with some nearby residential development and crosses West Branch Red Clay Creek before it skirts into the southern portion of East Marlborough Township, where it has a diamond interchange with PA 82 north of the borough of Kennett Square. From here, US 1 continues east and enters Kennett Township, where it crosses East Branch Red Clay Creek and passes near more development, coming to the northern terminus of the freeway at a southbound exit and northbound entrance with the Baltimore Pike.

At this point, US 1 continues northeast along the four-lane divided East Baltimore Pike into East Marlborough Township and passes businesses, widening to six lanes. Along this divided highway stretch of US 1, a few intersections are controlled by jughandles. The road narrows to four lanes and passes near homes and businesses, before coming to an interchange that provides access to Longwood Gardens and the Brandywine Valley Tourism Information visitor center to the north of the road, at which point it crosses back into Kennett Township. A short distance later, US 1 comes to an intersection with PA 52, at which point that route heads onto the East Baltimore Pike concurrent with US 1. The road heads into wooded areas with some homes and businesses, at which point PA 52 splits in the community of Hamorton to continue southeast toward the city of Wilmington, Delaware. The route turns to the northeast and crosses into Pennsbury Township, where the official name becomes Baltimore Pike. The road curves to the east again and passes through more woodland with some residential and commercial development, crossing an East Penn Railroad line at-grade before heading across the Brandywine Creek.

=== Delaware County ===
Upon crossing the Brandywine Creek, US 1 continues into Chadds Ford Township in Delaware County and passes to the north of the Brandywine Museum of Art. The route heads into the community of Chadds Ford and comes to an offset intersection with Creek Road in a commercial area. The road continues through wooded areas with some development, passing to the south of Brandywine Battlefield. The route curves northeast and heads into areas of businesses, intersecting US 202/US 322 in Painters Crossing. Here, US 322 heads north along US 202 and turns east to join US 1 in a concurrency along Baltimore Pike, running past more commercial establishments in Concord Township. In Concordville, US 322 splits to the southeast and US 1 continues along Baltimore Pike, intersecting Concord Road before heading into more wooded areas with occasional businesses and crossing the West Branch Chester Creek.

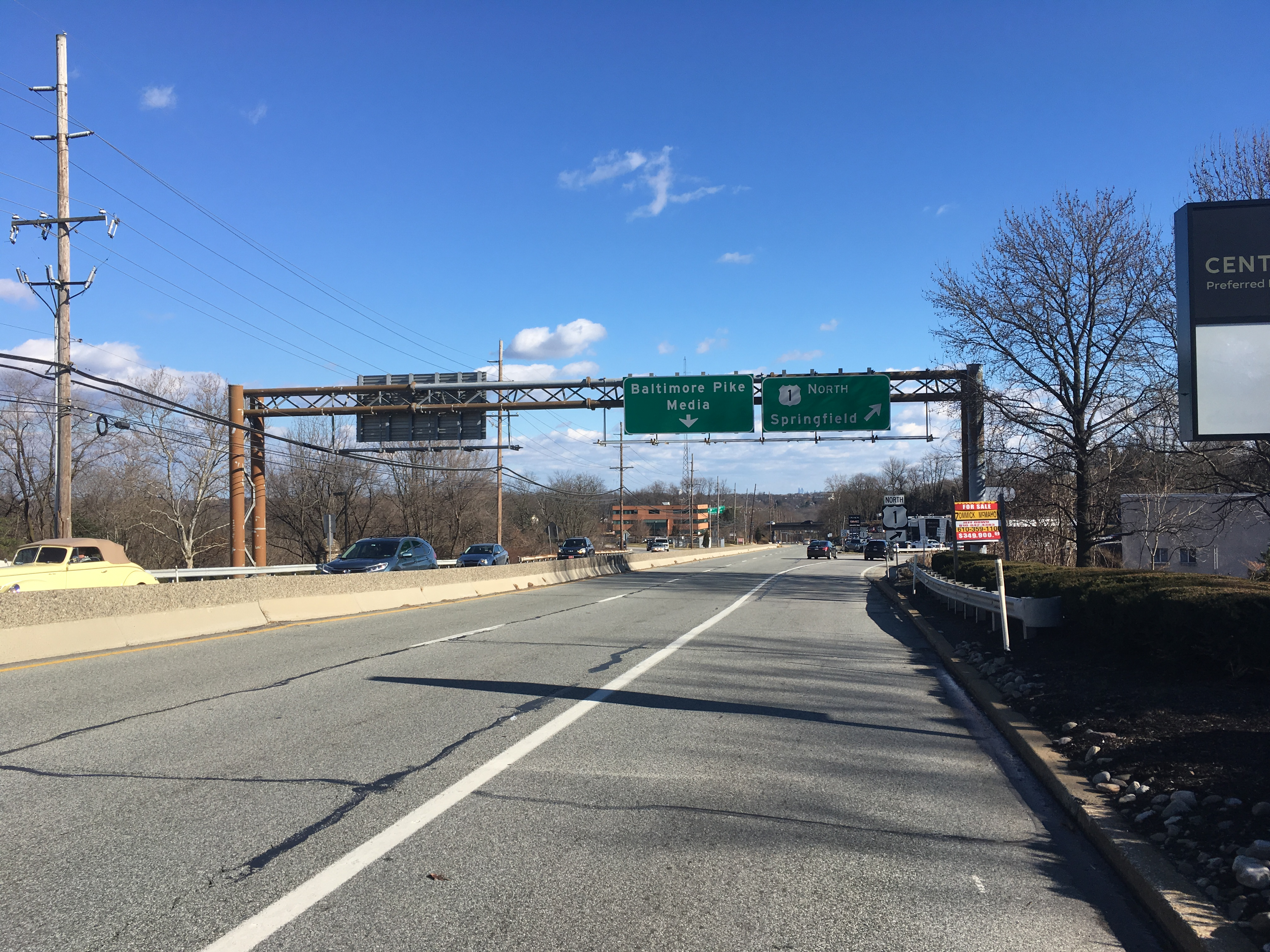
US 1 northbound at the split from Baltimore Pike onto the Media Bypass in Middletown Township

The route curves to the east and enters the borough of Chester Heights, running past businesses before heading into forested areas, where it passes north of the corporate headquarters of Wawa. The road turns northeast and crosses the Chester Creek into Middletown Township. The route passes under SEPTA's West Chester Branch northwest of Wawa Station, which serves as the terminus of SEPTA's Media/Wawa Line. US 1 heads through the community of Wawa and continues into commercial areas, coming to an intersection with PA 452 in the community of Lima. Following this, the route continues east and passes between the Promenade at Granite Run residential and retail center to the north and Riddle Hospital to the south, coming to an interchange with PA 352. A short distance later, US 1 splits from Baltimore Pike at an interchange by heading northeast onto the Media Bypass, a four-lane freeway which bypasses the borough of Media to the north. The Baltimore Pike interchange is a northbound exit and southbound entrance that also features a U-turn ramp from northbound US 1 to southbound US 1. US 1 runs through wooded areas with some nearby homes and crosses Ridley Creek into Upper Providence Township. The freeway continues northeast before it curves to the east and comes to a diamond interchange at PA 252 in the community of Rose Tree. The route runs through more wooded areas with some homes and reaches a southbound exit and northbound entrance at State Road. Following this, US 1 crosses Crum Creek into Marple Township and comes to a three-level diamond interchange at I-476.

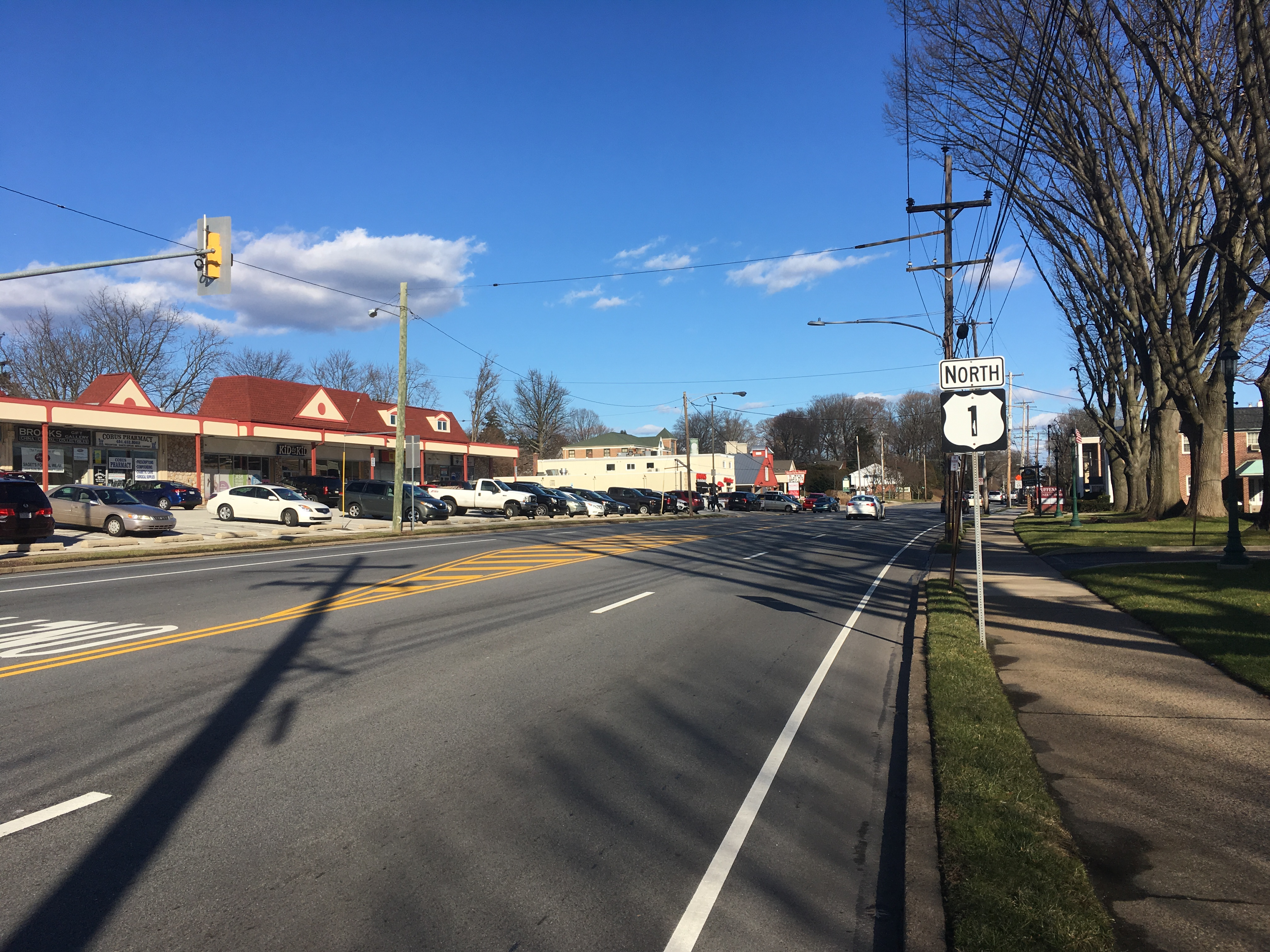
US 1 northbound in Drexel Hill

Past the I-476 interchange, US 1 continues east and heads into business areas, where the freeway ends and the route becomes four-lane divided South State Road, passing south of a shopping center. The route crosses into Springfield Township and reaches a diamond interchange with PA 320, with the southbound exit providing access to the shopping center. The road continues into residential areas and becomes North State Road upon crossing Springfield Road. US 1 curves northeast and crosses Darby Creek into Upper Darby Township, where it heads into business areas. State Road splits to the northeast and the route becomes Township Line Road, which heads north into Drexel Hill as a four-lane undivided road through residential neighborhoods. The road passes commercial development and curves to the northeast, forming the border between Haverford Township to the northwest and Upper Darby Township to the southeast. US 1 continues past homes as it heads through Drexel Hill, crossing Drexel Avenue and passing to the southeast of the Llanerch Country Club. The route heads into the community of Llanerch, where it gains a center left-turn lane and passes between a shopping center to the northwest and residences to the southeast. The road crosses Naylors Run and Darby Road/Lansdowne Avenue before it reaches an intersection with PA 3 a short distance later. From here, US 1 becomes a four-lane undivided road and continues northeast past residences and a few businesses before passing northwest of a golf course. The route passes over SEPTA's Norristown High Speed Line south of Township Line Road station before it comes to a bridge over Cobbs Creek. Upon crossing Cobbs Creek, US 1 runs along the border between Haverford Township in Delaware County to the northwest and the city of Philadelphia in Philadelphia County to the southeast, passing between homes to the northwest and a golf course to the southeast.

=== City Avenue ===
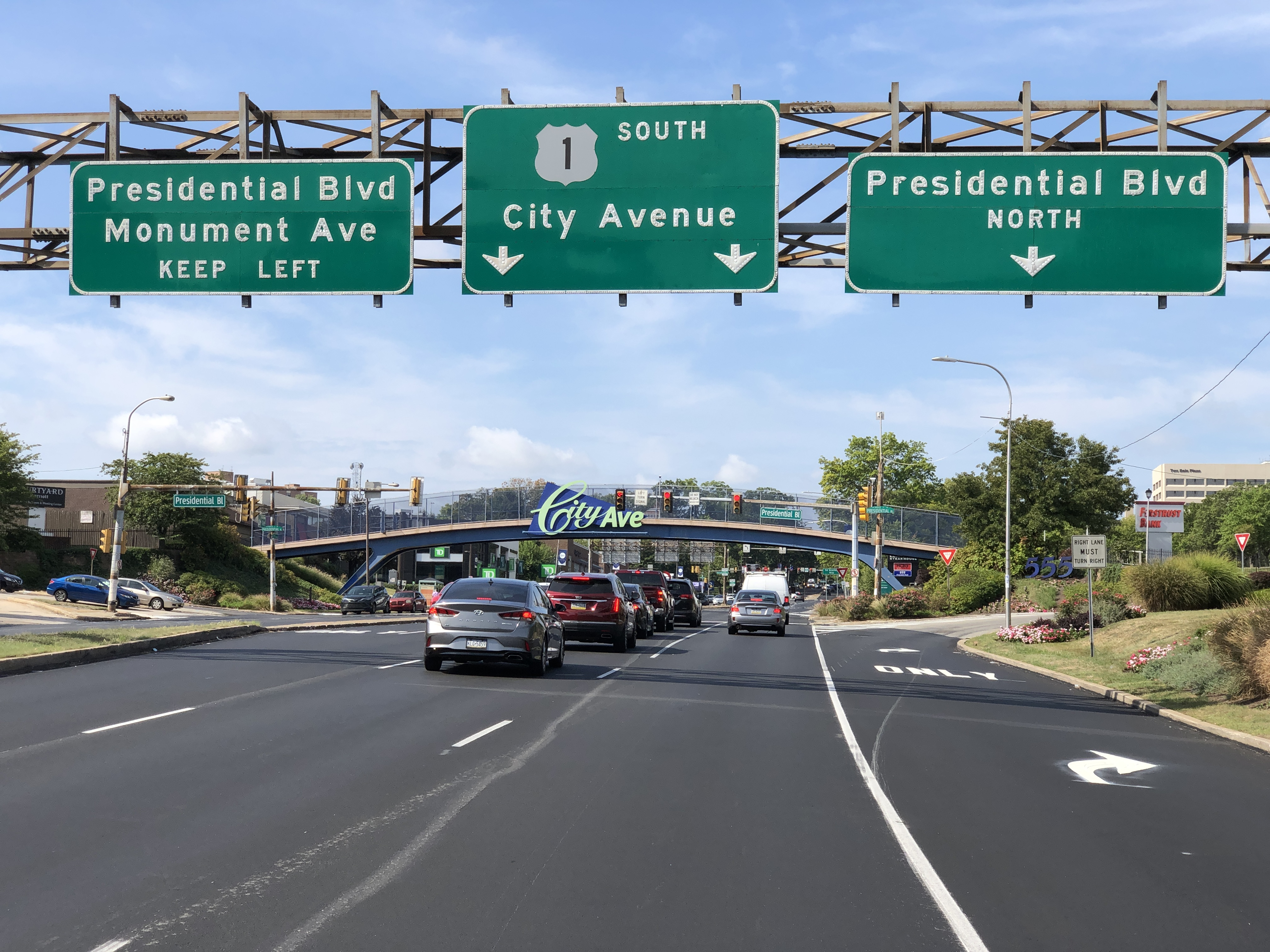
US 1 southbound along City Avenue at Presidential Boulevard on the border of Philadelphia and Lower Merion Township

The route becomes known as City Avenue and colloquially as City Line Avenue and forms the border between Lower Merion Township in Montgomery County to the northwest and the city of Philadelphia in Philadelphia County to the southeast, at which point it continues northeast as a five-lane road with a center left-turn lane past residential areas to the northwest and businesses to the southeast. The road crosses Haverford Road and continues through wooded residential areas, with the suburban community of Penn Wynne to the northwest and the Philadelphia neighborhood of Overbrook to the southeast. Along this stretch, the route crosses West Branch Indian Creek. US 1 passes to the southeast of Lankenau Medical Center before it crosses East Branch Indian Creek and reaches an intersection with US 30 (Lancaster Avenue). Past this intersection, the route runs between St. Charles Borromeo Seminary to the northwest and residential development to the southeast before it passes over Amtrak's Keystone Corridor railroad line north of Overbrook station, which serves SEPTA's Paoli/Thorndale Line. The road continues past mixed residential development before heading through the campus of Saint Joseph's University. US 1 becomes lined with businesses as it passes between the Lower Merion Township community of Bala Cynwyd to the northwest and the Philadelphia neighborhood of Wynnefield to the southeast. The route comes to a bridge over SEPTA's Cynwyd Line south of Bala station before it reaches an intersection with the eastern terminus of PA 23 and Conshohocken Avenue. The road passes more commercial development as it heads southeast of the Bala Cynwyd Shopping Center and crosses Belmont Avenue, where it passes north of the Belmont Reservoir. US 1 becomes a four-lane divided highway and heads past businesses and office buildings, passing between the former WCAU studios to the northwest and the WPVI-TV studios to the southeast prior to the Monument Road intersection.

=== Gustine Lake Interchange ===
US 1 comes to an interchange with I-76 (Schuylkill Expressway), at which point City Avenue heads across the Schuylkill River on the City Avenue Bridges to an interchange with Ridge Avenue, Lincoln Drive, and Kelly Drive and US 1 heads southeast concurrent with I-76 on the Schuylkill Expressway, an eight-lane freeway that fully enters Philadelphia and runs between the West Falls Yard on Norfolk Southern Railway's Harrisburg Line and the river to the north and wooded areas of Fairmount Park to the south.

=== Roosevelt Expressway and Roosevelt Boulevard ===
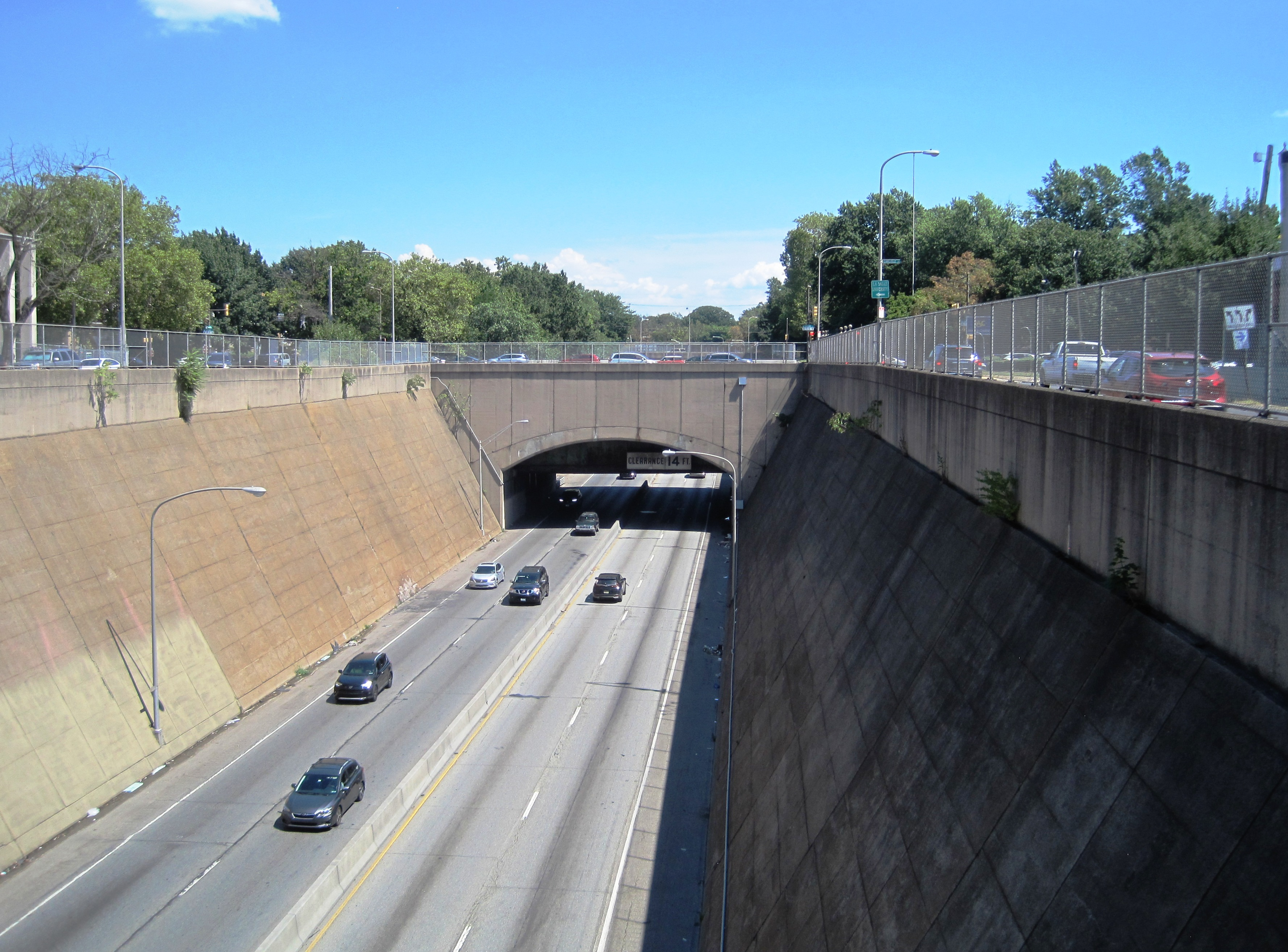
Overpass carrying PA 611 (North Broad Street) and SEPTA's Broad Street Line over US 1 (Roosevelt Expressway) in North Philadelphia

US 1 splits from I-76 by heading northeast on the Roosevelt Expressway, a six-lane freeway. Immediately after the split, the route heads onto the Twin Bridges, which carry the route over Norfolk Southern Railway's Harrisburg Line, a wye connection between the Harrisburg Line and CSX Transportation's Trenton Subdivision railroad line that uses the Philadelphia and Reading Railroad Schuylkill River Viaduct; Martin Luther King Jr. Drive; a trail; the Schuylkill River; the Schuylkill River Trail; Kelly Drive; and Ridge Avenue. From here, the freeway heads into the East Falls neighborhood and passes near urban residential and commercial development, coming to a southbound exit and northbound entrance serving Ridge Avenue and Kelly Drive. US 1 crosses under SEPTA's Manayunk/Norristown Line and continues through developed areas, heading to the southeast of Queen Lane Reservoir. The route comes to a southbound exit and entrance that serves Fox and Henry avenues. The freeway passes over SEPTA's Chestnut Hill West Line as it comes to an interchange with Wissahickon Avenue, which also provides access to Germantown Avenue and Hunting Park Avenue, in the Nicetown–Tioga neighborhood. Here, the freeway narrows to two northbound lanes while retaining three southbound lanes. US 1 heads into North Philadelphia and crosses through Fernhill Park before it curves east and comes to a bridge over SEPTA's Main Line and CSX Transportation's Trenton Subdivision north of SEPTA's Roberts Yard and south of Wayne Junction station serving the SEPTA line. The route continues along the bridge over urban neighborhoods before it descends into a cut as a four-lane freeway, with a northbound exit and southbound entrance serving PA 611 (Broad Street), provided via frontage roads (St. Lukes Street northbound and Cayuga Street southbound). The freeway passes under PA 611 (Broad Street), which also carries SEPTA's Broad Street Line subway. Past this interchange, US 1 comes to a southbound exit and northbound entrance with US 13 (Roosevelt Boulevard) north of the Hunting Park neighborhood, where the Roosevelt Expressway ends.

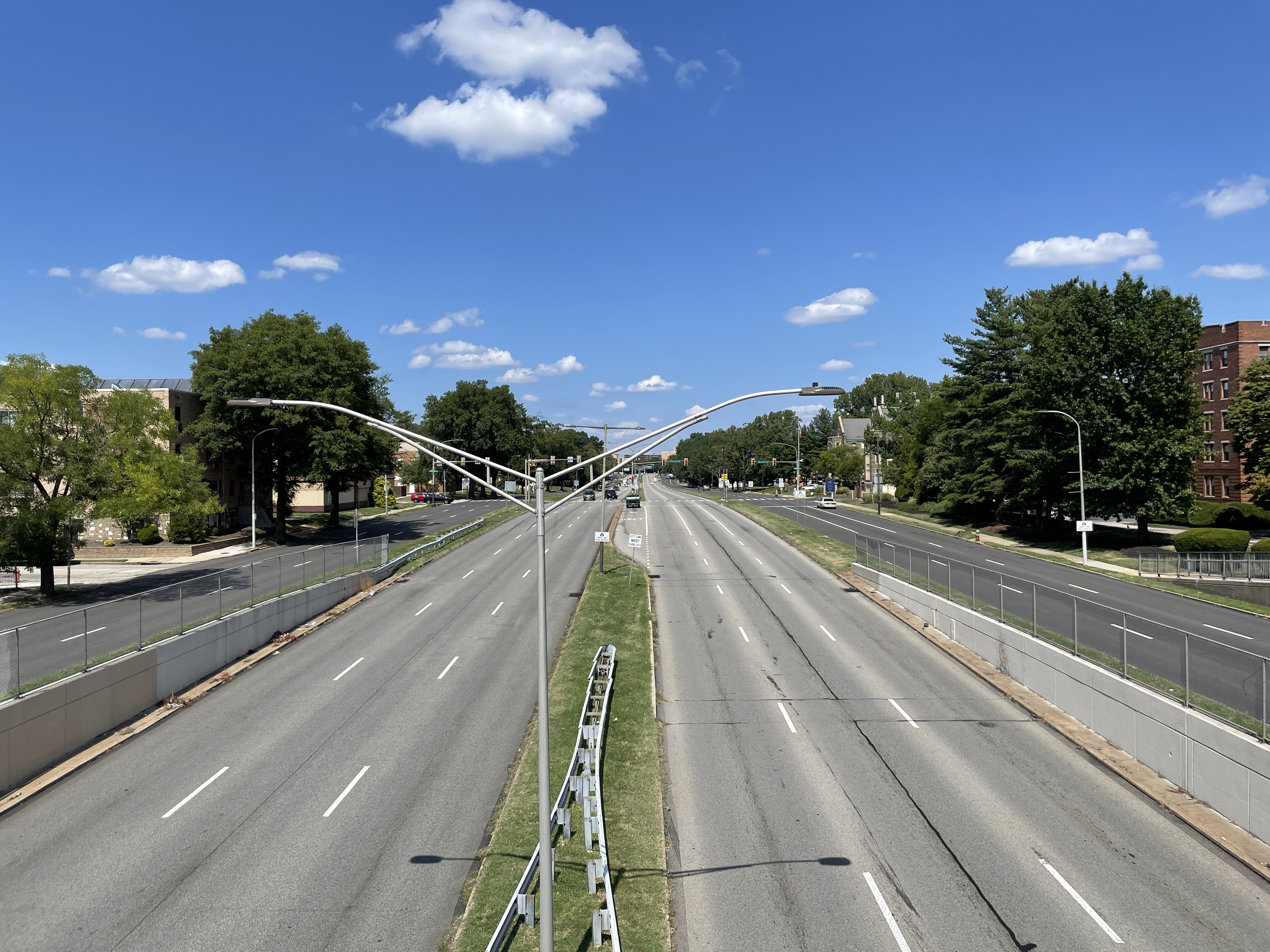
US 1 (Roosevelt Boulevard) northbound past Solly Avenue/Holme Avenue in Northeast Philadelphia

At this point, US 1 becomes concurrent with US 13 on Roosevelt Boulevard, a wide boulevard with local–express lanes that has 12 lanes total in a 3–3–3–3 configuration. Along Roosevelt Boulevard, access between the inner and outer carriageways is provided with narrow crossover ramps immediately between them; for most intersections, left turns are only permitted from the inner pair (or from separate left turn roadways) and right turns only from the outer, and crossing between them is not permitted at the intersections. There are speed cameras along the boulevard and many intersections also have red light cameras. The boulevard continues past urban residential neighborhoods, passing over an abandoned railroad grade before coming to the 5th Street junction, where the local lanes intersect the street at-grade and the express lanes pass over the street on a bridge. US 1/US 13 continues east and passes through the Feltonville neighborhood, where it intersects Rising Sun Avenue, before it crosses Tacony Creek. At this point, Roosevelt Boulevard continues into Northeast Philadelphia and curves to the southeast at an intersection with Adams and Whitaker avenues, passing between a shopping center to the northeast and Friends Hospital to the southwest. The boulevard curves to the northeast again at a junction with Adams and Summerdale avenues, passing near rowhouses before reaching Oxford Circle. At this point, the local lanes pass through Oxford Circle, a traffic circle at Cheltenham Avenue, Castor Avenue, and the southern terminus of PA 232, which runs along Oxford Avenue. The express lanes pass under Oxford Circle. Past the circle, Roosevelt Boulevard continues east-northeast through residential areas.

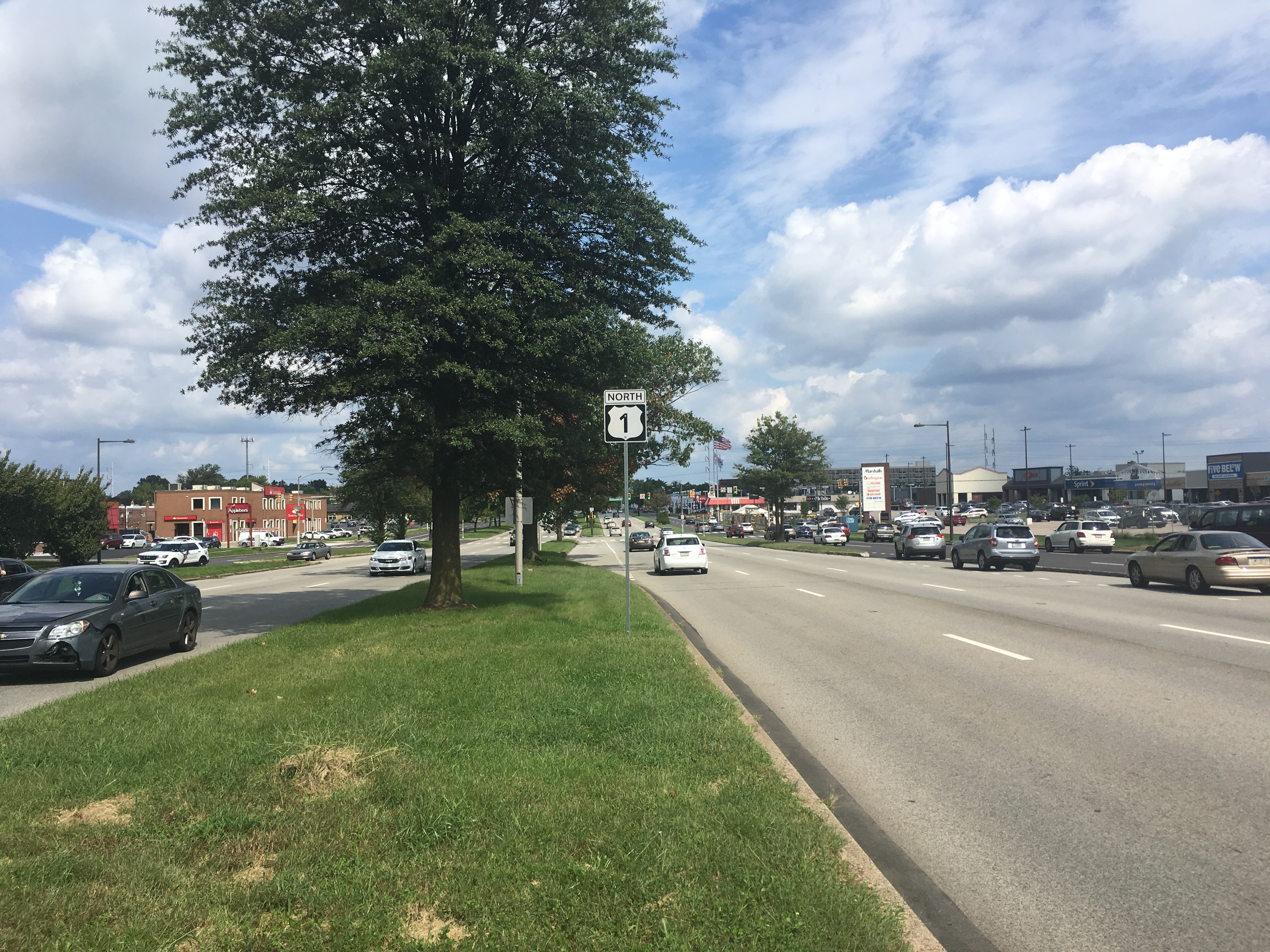
US 1 (Roosevelt Boulevard) northbound past the southern terminus of PA 532 (Welsh Road) in Northeast Philadelphia

The road crosses Bustleton Avenue and US 13 splits from US 1 by heading southeast on the one-way pair of Robbins Street northbound and Levick Street southbound, while US 1 continues northeast along Roosevelt Boulevard past urban homes and businesses. The boulevard bends to the northeast after crossing Harbison Avenue and continues through developed areas in the Mayfair neighborhood. The route comes to an interchange with PA 73 (Cottman Avenue), where the local lanes intersect PA 73 while the express lanes pass under it. Ramps provide access from the express lanes to the local lanes prior to the PA 73 junction in each direction. Past here, US 1 passes to the southeast of Roosevelt Mall before it curves north and runs near more residential and commercial development. The boulevard turns to the northeast and heads east of the Rhawnhurst neighborhood, crossing Rhawn Street before reaching an interchange with Solly Avenue/Holme Avenue at the former Pennypack Circle, where the local lanes intersect Solly Avenue/Holme Avenue while the express lanes head under the street. Following the interchange, the route runs to the west of Nazareth Hospital before it heads into wooded areas of Pennypack Park, where it passes over Pennypack Creek and the parallel Pennypack Trail.

After passing through the park, US 1 heads through residential areas, before running past businesses and coming to an intersection with the southern terminus of PA 532 at Welsh Road. The boulevard becomes lined with more commercial development and crosses Grant Avenue, which provides access to Northeast Philadelphia Airport. The route runs between a residential neighborhood to the northwest and a shopping center to the southeast before it passes northwest of Northeast Philadelphia Airport and heads past more commercial establishments, running parallel to an East Penn Railroad line to the east of the road. After this, the road comes to an intersection with PA 63 at Red Lion Road. At this point, PA 63 becomes concurrent with US 1 on Roosevelt Boulevard, and the boulevard heads northeast through areas of businesses and industrial parks. After intersecting Byberry Road, the concurrency with PA 63 ends at an unfinished cloverleaf interchange with Woodhaven Road, where PA 63 heads southeast onto the Woodhaven Road freeway. US 1 continues northeast past industrial parks, intersecting Southampton Road, before it passes to the west of Benjamin Rush State Park. At this point, the local and express lanes merge, and the route becomes a divided highway with three northbound lanes and four southbound lanes that crosses Poquessing Creek.

=== Bucks County ===
US 1 freeway northbound in Bensalem Township

Upon crossing the Poquessing Creek, US 1 leaves Philadelphia and enters Bensalem Township in Bucks County. At this point, the road becomes the Lincoln Highway, heading past businesses and narrowing to six total lanes at the Old Lincoln Highway intersection. Further northeast, the route becomes a freeway before coming to a partial cloverleaf interchange with PA 132. A short distance past PA 132, the road reaches the Bensalem interchange with the Pennsylvania Turnpike (I-276); this interchange is a double trumpet interchange and also includes a direct ramp from Horizon Boulevard to the Pennsylvania Turnpike. From here, US 1 becomes the Martin Luther King Jr. Memorial Highway and passes near several businesses before coming to a partial cloverleaf interchange with Rockhill Drive, which provides access to the Neshaminy Mall to the east of the road. The route passes between an office park to the west and the shopping mall to the east before it heads into wooded areas and crosses Neshaminy Creek. Upon crossing the creek, the freeway heads into Middletown Township and comes to a northbound exit and southbound entrance with the southern terminus of US 1 Business (US 1 Bus.). At this interchange, the freeway narrows to four lanes. From here, US 1 passes over CSX Transportation's Trenton Subdivision and SEPTA's West Trenton Line before it becomes paralleled with frontage roads on each side as it reaches an interchange connecting to Highland Avenue and Old Lincoln Highway, heading near homes and businesses. The route curves to the east-northeast and runs through residential areas, crossing into the borough of Langhorne Manor, where it has a northbound exit and southbound entrance at Hulmeville Avenue. The freeway heads back into Middletown Township again and comes to an interchange providing a connection to PA 413 via South Bellevue and East Gillam avenues. Past this interchange, the frontage roads end and US 1 heads northeast through wooded areas with nearby development, reaching a partial cloverleaf interchange at PA 213. The route passes near residential and commercial development before it heads through wooded areas and bends to the east-northeast, crossing Mill Creek. The freeway passes over the West Trenton Line and Trenton Subdivision south of Woodbourne station on the West Trenton Line before it comes to a bridge over Norfolk Southern Railway's Morrisville Line and reaches a cloverleaf interchange with I-295.

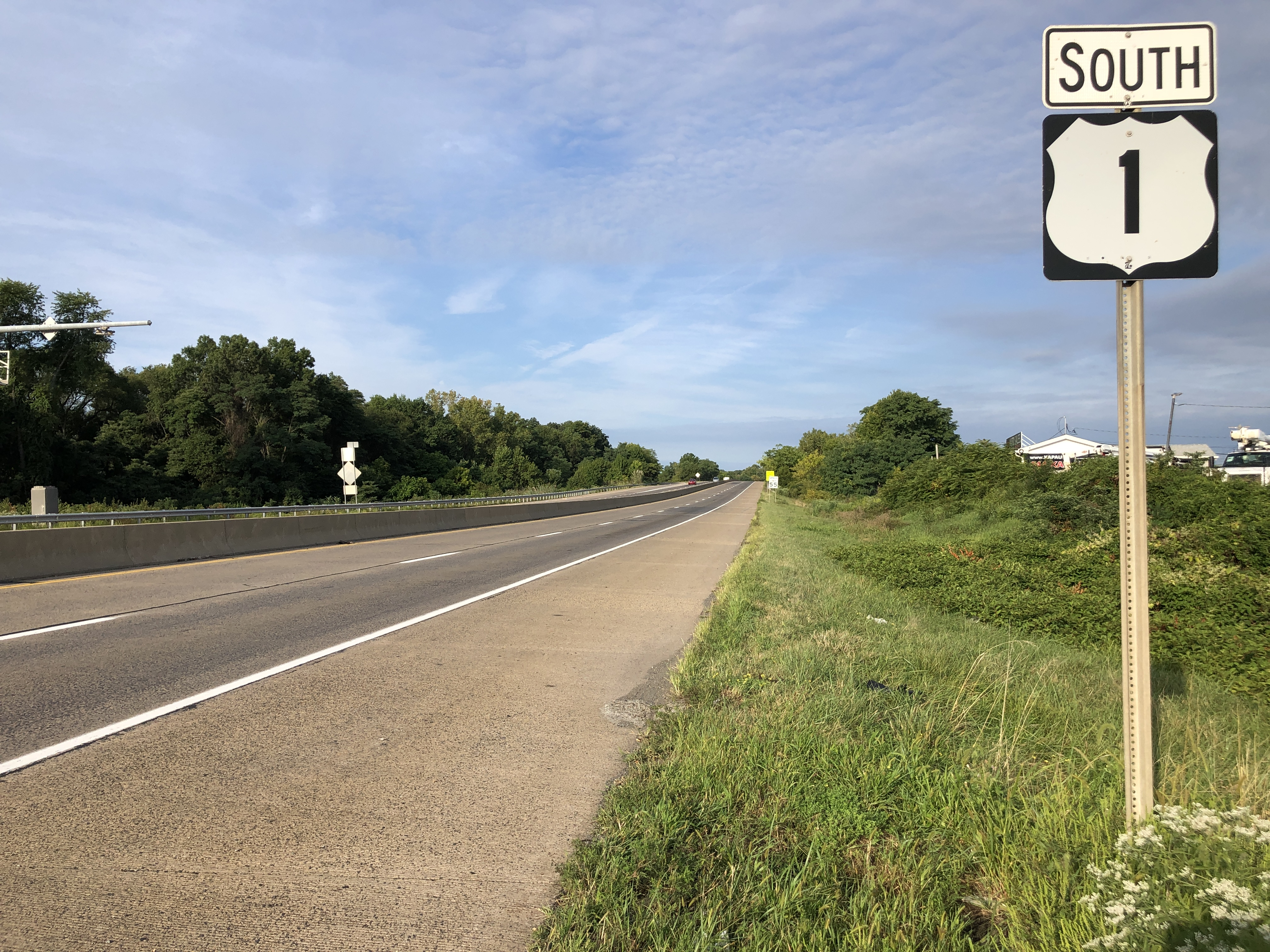
US 1 freeway southbound past US 13 in Falls Township

Past the I-295 interchange, US 1 heads east and runs to the north of an industrial park. The route becomes the border between Lower Makefield Township to the north and Falls Township to the south and comes to a diamond interchange with Oxford Valley Road, which heads south to provide access to the Oxford Valley Mall and the Sesame Place Philadelphia amusement park. From here, the freeway fully enters Falls Township and runs between woodland to the north and industrial areas to the south, continuing to an interchange with Stony Hill Road and the northern terminus of US 1 Bus. north of the community of Fairless Hills. A short distance later, US 1 comes to a partial cloverleaf interchange with the northern terminus of the US 13 freeway and Pine Grove Road, where the ramp from southbound US 1 to US 1 Bus. splits from the freeway and also acts as a collector–distributor road for the US 13 interchange. Following this interchange, the route reaches a northbound exit and southbound entrance with the southern terminus of PA 32. The ramp from southbound PA 32 merges into the collector–distributor road for the US 13 and US 1 Bus. interchanges. At this point, the freeway curves to the northeast and runs through wooded areas with nearby residential and commercial development, entering the borough of Morrisville. Here, the route comes to a bridge over the Delaware Canal and Conrail Shared Assets Operations (CSAO)'s Penn Warner Lead railroad line before it comes to an interchange with Pennsylvania Avenue that provides access to Morrisville. Past this interchange, US 1 comes to a southbound toll plaza before it passes over the CSAO line and the Delaware River on the Trenton–Morrisville Toll Bridge, where it leaves Pennsylvania for New Jersey and heads into the city of Trenton.

== History ==
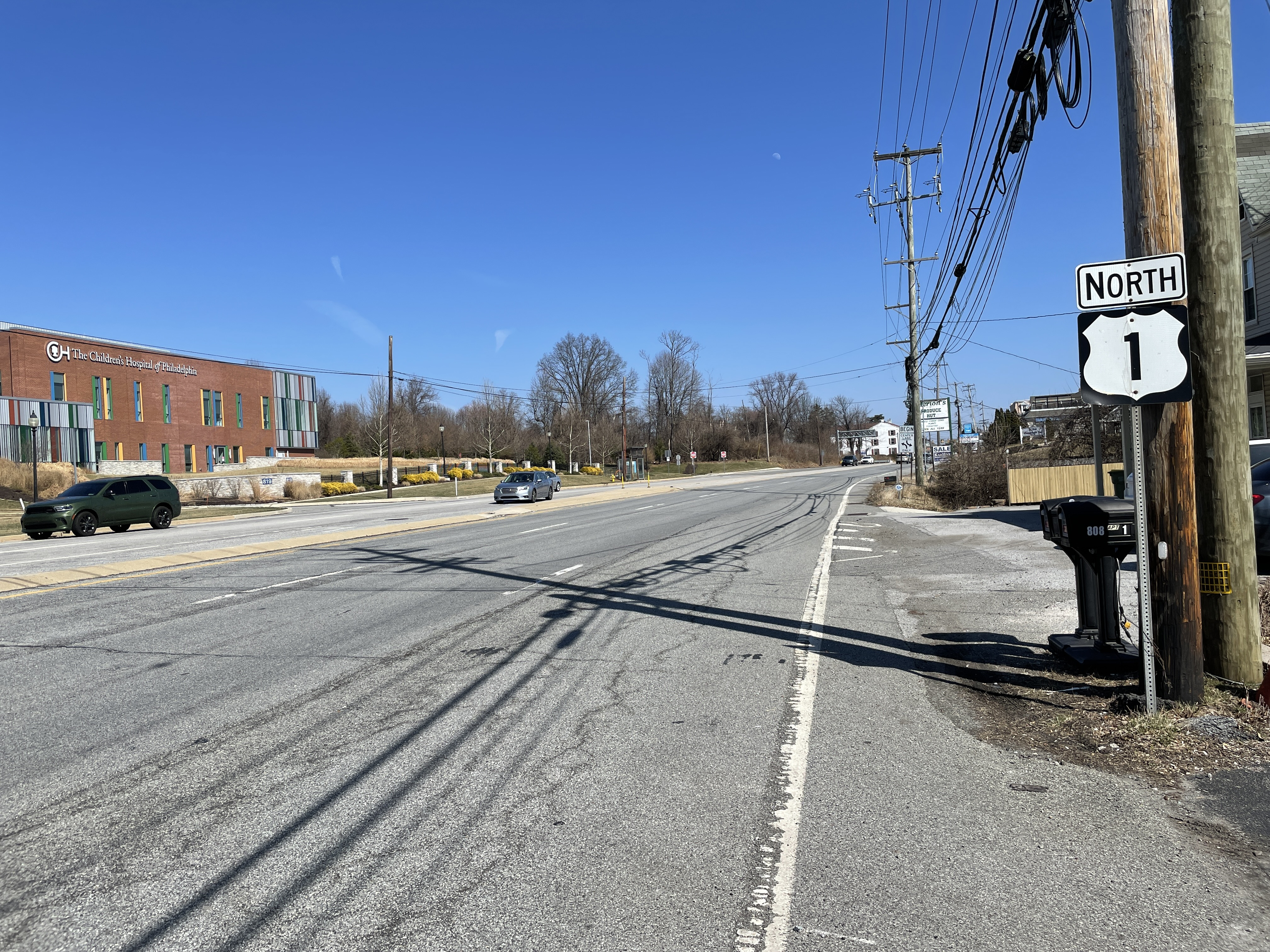
US 1 northbound past US 322 in Concordville

In Chester County, before the US 1 expressway was built there, US 1 continued up the Baltimore Pike (which now has a dead-end section in Nottingham where northbound US 1 veers away from the Baltimore Pike alignment onto the expressway). In Oxford, US 1 northbound ran on South 3rd Street, then turned right on Market Street (PA 472) (North 3rd Street is the beginning of PA 10), then very quickly turned left onto Lincoln Street, and, after leaving Oxford, the road ran by Lincoln University. Approaching Avondale, the Baltimore Pike traffic bent southeast along Pennsylvania Avenue (PA 41), then the Baltimore Pike split off after Avondale. In the town of Kennett Square, northbound US 1 ran along Cypress Street while southbound US 1 ran along State Street, and those streets were marked east to west, not north to south. After Kennett Square, the US 1 expressway ends and its traffic merges onto the Baltimore Pike.

Except for the southernmost part of the Baltimore Pike at Nottingham, the Chester County part of old US 1 is still driveable. There is the deadend mentioned above; also, a small part of the Baltimore Pike is permanently blocked by the Herr's snack company property.

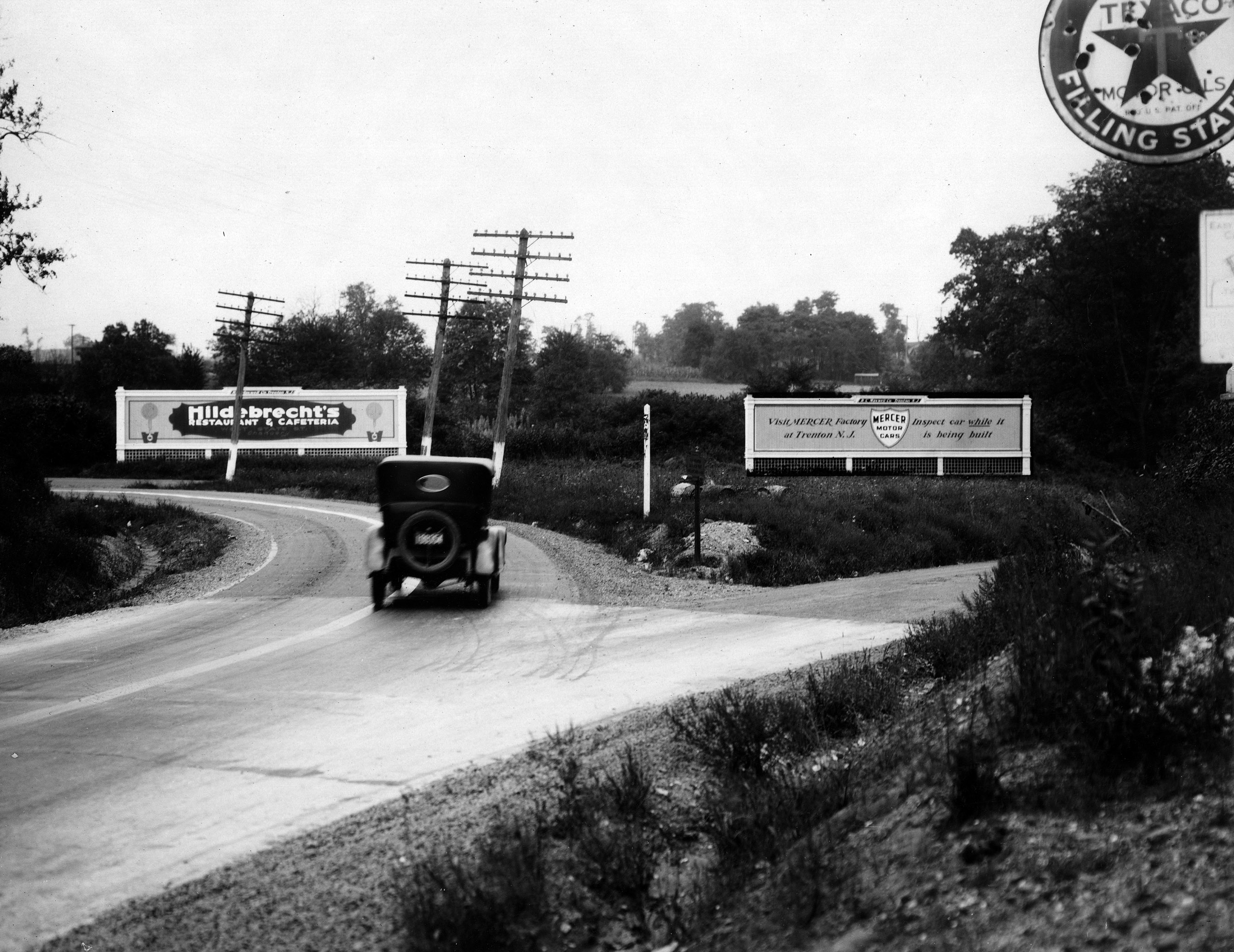
Lincoln Highway in Bucks County in 1922. This is now looking west on Woolston Drive with a ramp to the US 1 freeway ahead; the underpass under the Trenton Cutoff is to the left.

Between Philadelphia and Trenton, US 1 is a part of the Lincoln Highway, a cross-country auto trail that ran from San Francisco east to New York City. It was also a part of the Byberry and Bensalem Turnpike between Oakford (Neshaminy Creek) and Philadelphia.

From the Lancaster Turnpike, where the Lincoln Highway headed west along US 30, the Lincoln Highway originally headed east along Market Street to Penn Square around Philadelphia City Hall, where it turned north onto Broad Street. (Prior to the building of Roosevelt Boulevard, the main road followed Frankford Avenue to Bustleton Avenue from Center City.)

A bypass was added around Center City (in addition to the route through Center City) in 1924, using Hunting Park, Ridge, and City avenues. This alignment is now used by US 1, except that Hunting Park and Ridge avenues are now bypassed by the Roosevelt and Schuylkill expressways.

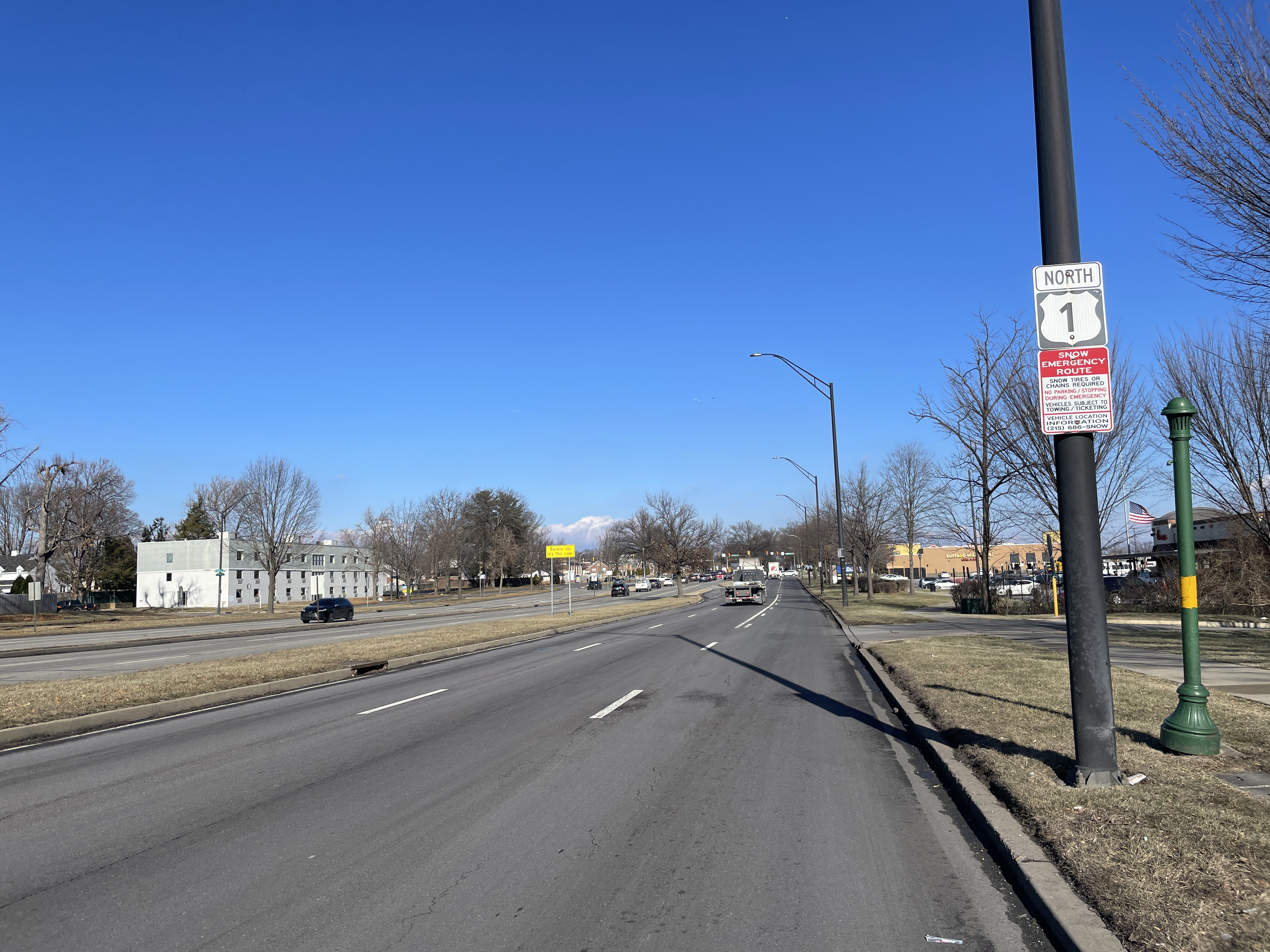
US 1 (Roosevelt Boulevard) northbound past Grant Avenue in Northeast Philadelphia

From Broad Street, the Lincoln Highway then headed north on the Roosevelt Boulevard. By 1914, the Roosevelt Boulevard was completed to Rhawn Street, and the Lincoln Highway turned off Roosevelt Boulevard there to reach Bustleton Avenue. The old alignment splits from Bustleton Avenue at Haldeman Avenue and then follows Roosevelt Boulevard. (A short piece of Old Bustleton Avenue southwest of Welsh Road was used, crossing Pennypack Creek east of the current bridge.)

A 1920 extension took the boulevard to Welsh Road, allowing traffic to turn off Bustleton Avenue there (that route is still PA 532), and a 1920s extension took it to the intersection with Old Lincoln Highway just north of the Poquessing Creek bridge. North of there, the present US 1 was completed in 1933 to the south end of the 1923 Langhorne bypass and in 1938 to Bellevue Avenue (PA 413) in downtown Langhorne.

From near Hornig Road in Northeast Philadelphia, the old alignment heads through woods, closed to traffic, paralleling powerlines, after which it was upgraded on the spot to become Roosevelt Boulevard. The original route is then gated at an 1805 stone bridge across Poquessing Creek at the Philadelphia city line, just before crossing Roosevelt Boulevard. After crossing Street Road (PA 132), the Old Lincoln Highway then becomes one-way southbound past the Bristol Road intersection and crosses the Neshaminy Creek. (This bridge itself was built in 1921 to replace a covered bridge just to the west.)

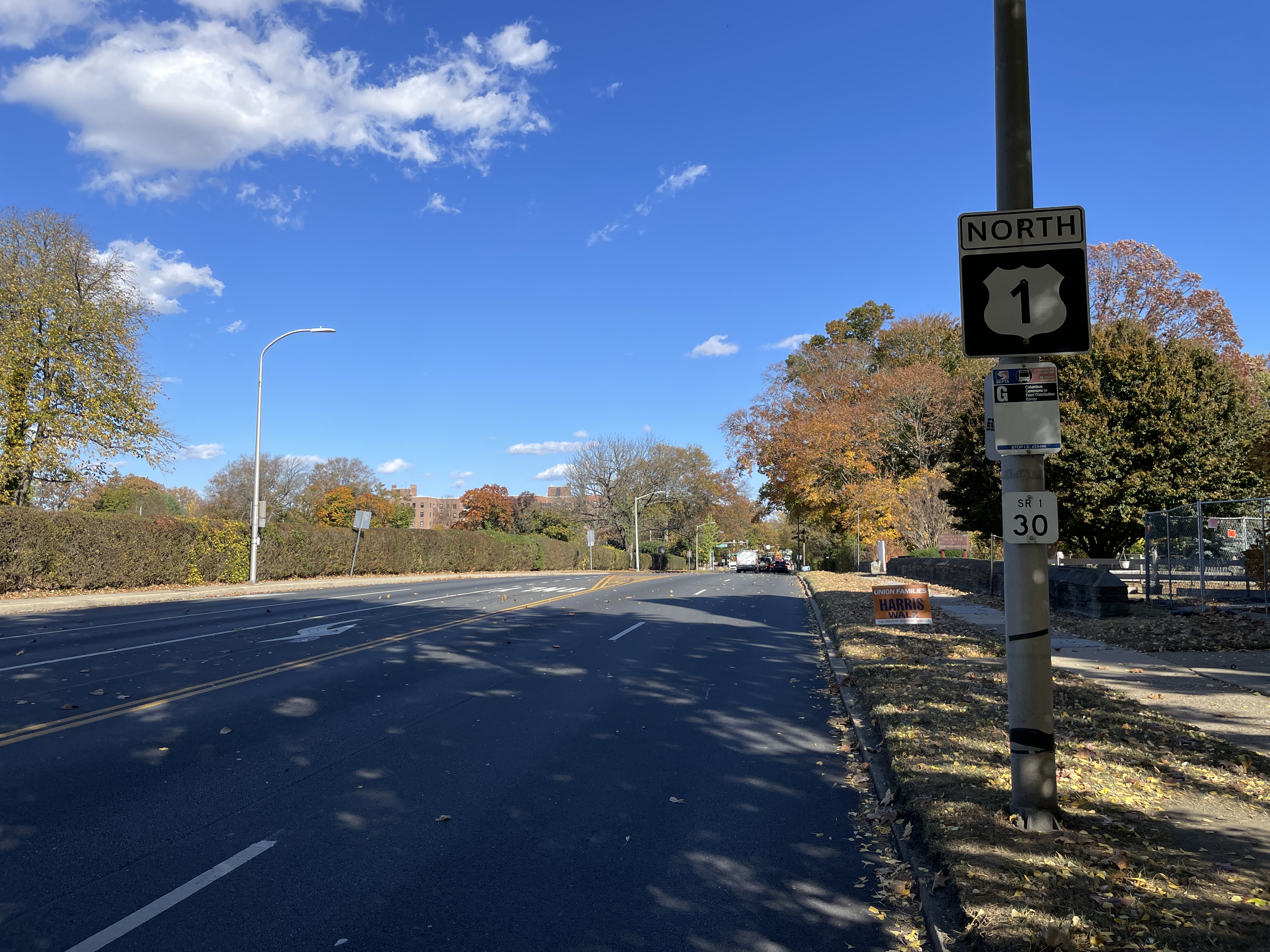
US 1 northbound past US 30 on the border of Philadelphia and Lower Merion Township

The present route of Lincoln Highway and US 1 Bus. was built in 1923, bypassing Langhorne to the south and avoiding two railroad crossings. This crosses under the US 1 freeway just south of the railroad, where the older route had crossed the railroad. From Oakford, the Old Lincoln Highway heads northeast, no longer crossing SEPTA's West Trenton Line, as the US 1 freeway crosses just to the east. It then headed onto Maple Avenue (PA 213) to pass through Langhorne. Past Langhorne, the original route used what is presently known as Lincoln Highway (US 1 Bus.).

At Fallsington, the original road crossed the Pennsylvania Railroad's Trenton Cutoff on a bridge just east of the present bridge, built on a reverse curve to shorten the span. It used Trenton Road and Main Street from the bridge to the intersection with Woolston, where Main Street is now cut. In 1917, an underpass under the railroad was built to the west on Woolston Drive; this became the main route by 1924.

It then headed toward Morrisville, where it first crossed the Delaware River the Calhoun Street Bridge, running along Trenton Avenue to Fallsington. In 1920, it was moved to the Lower Trenton Bridge, passing through downtown Morrisville.

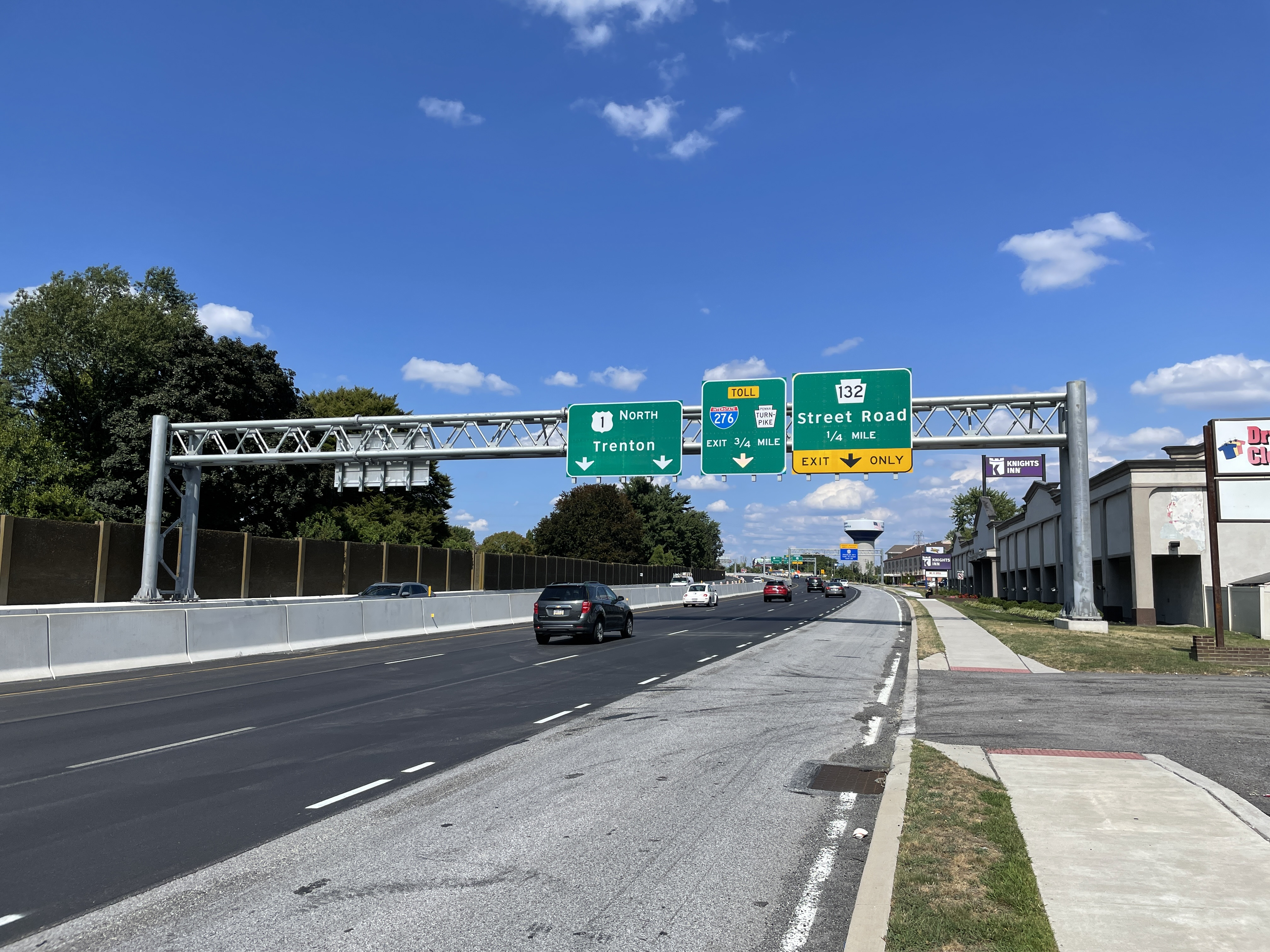
US 1 northbound approaching the PA 132 interchange in Bensalem Township

On November 21, 1988, an act of the Pennsylvania General Assembly designated the portion of US 1 in Bucks County between the Pennsylvania Turnpike and the New Jersey border as the Martin Luther King Jr. Expressway after civil rights leader Martin Luther King Jr. On June 14, 2000, the Roosevelt Boulevard portion of US 1 was designated the police officer Daniel Faulkner Memorial Highway in memory of Daniel Faulkner, an officer of the Philadelphia Police Department who was murdered by Mumia Abu-Jamal in 1981. On May 31, 2002, the US 1 freeway in Chester County between the Maryland border and Kennett Square was designated the John H. Ware III Memorial Highway in honor of John H. Ware III, a politician from Oxford that served in the Pennsylvania State Senate and U.S. House of Representatives and pushed for the construction of the US 1 freeway in Chester County. On January 19, 2012, the section of US 1 in Bucks County between Philadelphia and the Delaware River was designated the Detective Christopher Jones Memorial Highway after a Middletown Township police officer who was killed while conducting a traffic stop along the highway when two cars collided and hit his police car, which struck him.

On October 29, 2018, work began on a project to reconstruct and widen the portion of US 1 between Old Lincoln Highway and the Rockhill Drive interchange in Bensalem Township. The project widened US 1 to a six-lane road from PA 132 to north of the Pennsylvania Turnpike, upgraded the PA 132 and Pennsylvania Turnpike interchanges, and rebuilt bridges. It was completed in December 2022.

On March 22, 2021, construction began to rebuild and widen US 1 between Rockhill Drive in Bensalem Township and north of the US 1 Bus. interchange in Middletown Township, with completion expected in mid-2026. The third and final phase of reconstructing US 1 in Bucks County will take place between north of the US 1 Bus. interchange in Middletown Township and north of the PA 413 interchange in Langhorne.

== Major intersections ==
County	Location	mi	km	Old exit	New exit	Destinations	Notes
Chester	West Nottingham Township	0.000	0.000			US 1 south	Continuation into Maryland
Chester	West Nottingham Township	0.748	1.204	Southern end of freeway section			
Chester	West Nottingham Township	2.092	3.367			PA 272 – Nottingham	
Chester	Oxford	5.095	8.200			PA 472 – Quarryville, Oxford	
Chester	Lower Oxford Township	7.126	11.468			PA 10 – Cochranville, Oxford	
Chester	Upper Oxford Township	10.047	16.169			PA 896 – New London, Russellville	Access to Lincoln University
Chester	Penn Township	12.497	20.112			PA 796 – Jennersville	
Chester	London Grove Township	15.024	24.179			PA 841 – West Grove	
Chester	London Grove Township	16.336	26.290			PA 41 – Avondale, Chatham	
Chester	New Garden Township	18.359	29.546			Toughkenamon, London Grove	Access via Newark Road
Chester	East Marlborough Township	21.177	34.081			PA 82 – Unionville, Kennett Square	
Chester	Kennett Township	22.534	36.265			Kennett Square	Southbound exit and northbound entrance; access via East Baltimore Pike; former US 1
Chester	Kennett Township	22.534	36.265	Northern end of freeway section			
Chester	Kennett Township	23.791	38.288			Longwood Gardens	Interchange; access via Longwood Road
Chester	Kennett Township	23.911	38.481			PA 52 north (Lenape Road) – West Chester	Southern end of PA 52 concurrency
Chester	Kennett Township	24.587	39.569			PA 52 south (Kennett Pike) – Wilmington	Northern end of PA 52 concurrency
Delaware	Chadds Ford–Concord township line	30.665	49.351			US 202 / US 322 west – West Chester, Wilmington, DE	Southern end of US 322 concurrency
Delaware	Concord Township	31.710	51.032			US 322 east (Conchester Highway) to I-95 – Chester	Northern end of US 322 concurrency
Delaware	Middletown Township	36.956	59.475			PA 452 (Pennell Road) – Frazer, Marcus Hook	
Delaware	Middletown Township	37.788	60.814			PA 352 (Middletown Road) – Chester, Frazer, Gradyville	Interchange; access to Penn State Brandywine
Delaware	Middletown Township	37.922	61.030	Southern end of freeway section			
Delaware	Middletown Township	37.922	61.030			Baltimore Pike – Media	Northbound exit and southbound entrance
Delaware	Upper Providence Township	40.191	64.681			PA 252 – Media, Newtown Square	Access to Delaware County Community College
Delaware	Upper Providence Township	41.131	66.194			State Road	Southbound exit and northbound entrance
Delaware	Marple Township	41.677	67.073			I-476 – Plymouth Meeting, Chester	Three-level diamond interchange; exit 5 on I-476
Delaware	Marple Township	42.212	67.934	Northern end of freeway section			
Delaware	Springfield Township	42.405	68.244			PA 320 (Sproul Road) – Shopping Centers	Interchange
Delaware	Haverford–Upper Darby township line	46.279	74.479			PA 3 (West Chester Pike)	
Montgomery–Philadelphia county line	Lower Merion Township–Philadelphia line	48.820	78.568			US 30 (Lancaster Avenue)	
Montgomery–Philadelphia county line	Lower Merion Township–Philadelphia line	50.534	81.327			PA 23 west (Conshohocken State Road)	Eastern terminus of PA 23
Montgomery–Philadelphia county line	Lower Merion Township–Philadelphia line	51.735	83.259			City Avenue east to I-76 west / Lincoln Drive – Valley Forge	Northbound access to City Avenue east and southbound access from City Avenue west; exit 339 on I-76
Montgomery–Philadelphia county line	Lower Merion Township–Philadelphia line	51.735	83.259	Southern end of freeway section			
Montgomery–Philadelphia county line	Lower Merion Township–Philadelphia line	51.735	83.259	33	339	I-76 west – Valley Forge	Southbound exit and northbound entrance; southern end of I-76 concurrency
Philadelphia	Philadelphia	52.172	83.963	34	340B	I-76 east – Central Philadelphia	Northern end of I-76 concurrency; exit number not signed southbound
Philadelphia	Philadelphia			Twin Bridges over the Schuylkill River			
Philadelphia	Philadelphia	52.627	84.695			Ridge Avenue / Kelly Drive	Southbound exit and northbound entrance
Philadelphia	Philadelphia	53.241	85.683			Fox Street / Henry Avenue	No northbound exit; access to Thomas Jefferson University
Philadelphia	Philadelphia	53.626	86.303			Wissahickon Avenue / Hunting Park Avenue / Germantown Avenue	Northbound exit and southbound entrance; access to Thomas Jefferson University, Wayne Avenue, and Henry Avenue
Philadelphia	Philadelphia	54.899	88.351			To PA 611 (Broad Street)	Northbound exit and southbound entrance; access via Cayuga Street/St. Luke Street; access to La Salle University
Philadelphia	Philadelphia	55.037	88.573			US 13 south (Hunting Park Avenue) / Broad Street (PA 611)	Southbound exit and northbound entrance; southern end of US 13 concurrency; no trucks to Broad Street
Philadelphia	Philadelphia	55.407	89.169	Northern end of freeway section			
Philadelphia	Philadelphia	58.600– 58.670	94.308– 94.420			PA 232 north (Oxford Avenue) / Cheltenham Avenue	Interchange (Oxford Circle); southern terminus of PA 232
Philadelphia	Philadelphia	59.383	95.568			US 13 north (Robbins Street) – Tacony–Palmyra Bridge	Northbound one-way pair; northern end of US 13 concurrency
Philadelphia	Philadelphia	59.469	95.706			US 13 south (Levick Street)	Southbound one-way pair; northern end of US 13 concurrency southbound
Philadelphia	Philadelphia	60.549	97.444			PA 73 (Cottman Avenue) to I-95	Interchange
Philadelphia	Philadelphia	61.696– 61.745	99.290– 99.369			Holme Avenue / Solly Avenue	Interchange; former Pennypack Circle
Philadelphia	Philadelphia	62.900	101.228			PA 532 north (Welsh Road)	Southern terminus of PA 532
Philadelphia	Philadelphia	64.648	104.041			PA 63 west (Red Lion Road)	Southern end of PA 63 concurrency
Philadelphia	Philadelphia	65.987	106.196			PA 63 east (Woodhaven Road) to I-95	Interchange; northern end of PA 63 concurrency
Bucks	Bensalem Township			Southern end of freeway section			
Bucks	Bensalem Township	68.074	109.554			PA 132 (Street Road)	Access to Parx Casino and Racing
Bucks	Bensalem Township	68.344	109.989			I-276 Toll / Penna Turnpike – New York, Harrisburg	Exit 351 (Bensalem) on I-276 / Penna Turnpike; E-ZPass or toll-by-plate
Bucks	Bensalem Township	68.891	110.869			Rockhill Drive	
Bucks	Middletown Township	69.827	112.376			US 1 Bus. north – Penndel	Northbound exit and southbound entrance; southern terminus of US 1 Bus.
Bucks	Middletown Township	70.091	112.801			Highland Avenue / Old Lincoln Highway	Signed for Highland Avenue northbound, Old Lincoln Highway southbound; access to Langhorne and Langhorne Manor, Pennsylvania
Bucks	Langhorne Manor	72.214	116.217			Hulmeville Avenue	Northbound exit and southbound entrance
Bucks	Langhorne Manor–Middletown Township line	72.245	116.267			Bellevue Avenue / PA 413	
Bucks	Middletown Township	72.923	117.358			PA 213 (Maple Avenue)	
Bucks	Middletown Township	74.725– 74.749	120.258– 120.297			I-295 to I-95 south – Princeton, Philadelphia	Exit 5 on I-295; former I-95
Bucks	Middletown Township	75.508	121.518			Oxford Valley	Access via Oxford Valley Road; access to Sesame Place
Bucks	Falls Township	78.067	125.637			Fairless Hills	Access via Stony Hill Road; no southbound exit
Bucks	Falls Township	78.874	126.935			US 13 south / US 1 Bus. south – Tullytown, Bristol, Yardley	No northbound access to US 1 Bus./Yardley; access to Yardley via Pine Grove Road
Bucks	Falls Township	79.298	127.618			PA 32 north – Morrisville	Northbound exit and southbound entrance; southern terminus of PA 32; former US 1 Bus.
Bucks	Morrisville	80.516	129.578			Pennsylvania Avenue – Morrisville	
Delaware River		80.916	130.222	Trenton–Morrisville Toll Bridge (southbound toll; cash or E-ZPass)			
Delaware River		80.916	130.222			US 1 north – Trenton, New York	Continuation into New Jersey
1.000 mi = 1.609 km; 1.000 km = 0.621 mi: Concurrency terminus; Incomplete access; Tolled

== See also ==
U.S. Route 1
Previous state: Maryland	Pennsylvania	Next state: New Jersey
