= Penn Township, Chester County, Pennsylvania =

Township in Pennsylvania, US

Penn Township
- Township
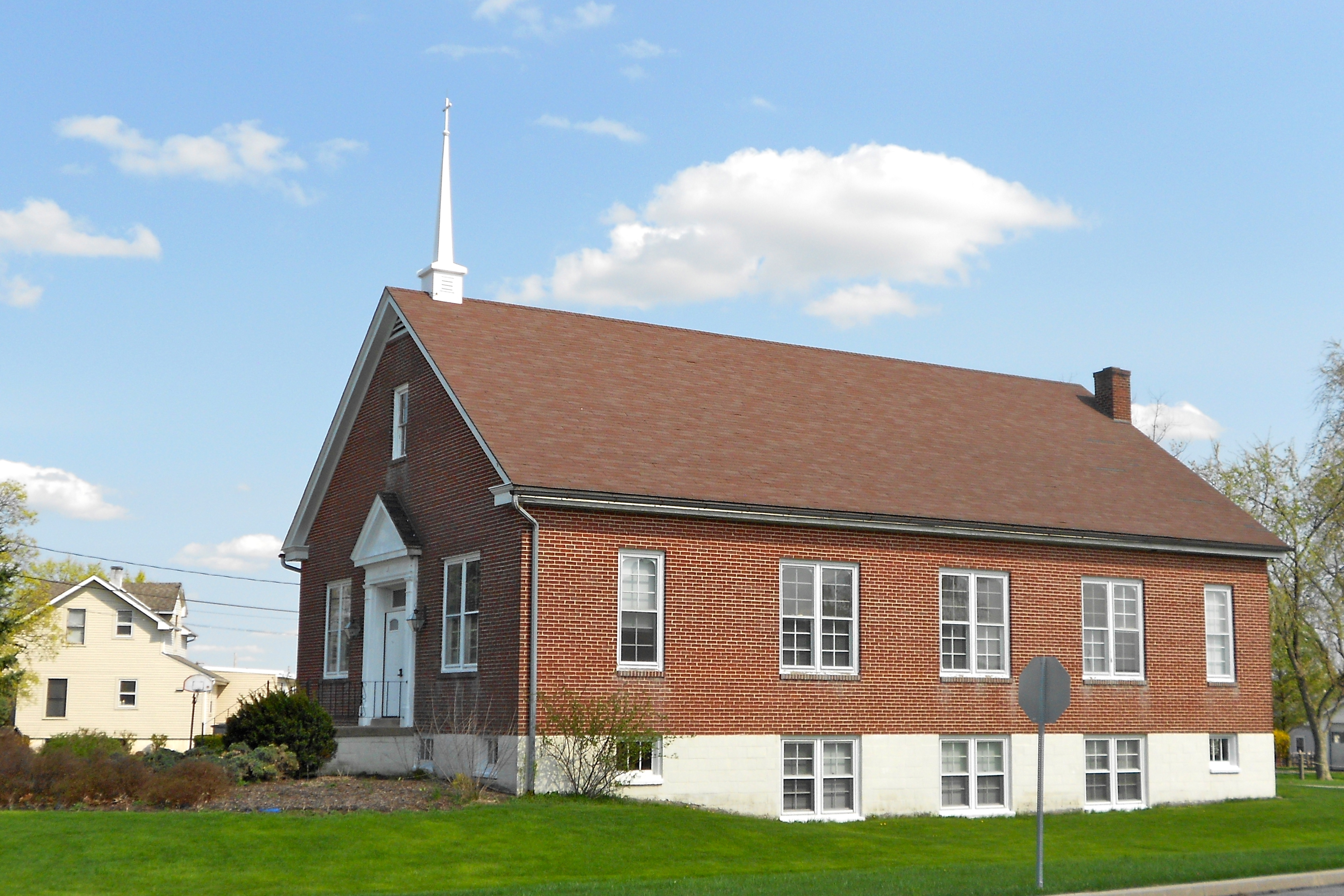
- Church of the Brethren in Jennersville

- Location of Penn Township in Chester County and of Chester County in Pennsylvania

- Location of Pennsylvania in the United States
- Coordinates: 39°48′49″N 75°52′20″W
- Country: United States
- State: Pennsylvania
- County: Chester
- Congressional District: PA-6
- Founder: William Penn
- Named for: William Penn

Government
  - Type: Council–manager government
  - Body: Board of Supervisors
  - Supervisors: List: Victor Mantegna D – Chairman; William "Radar" O'Connell (R) – Vice Chairman; Jay Ennis (R); Carlton Snow (R); Jake Moore (R); (R)

Area
  - Total: 9.65 sq mi (24.99 km^{2})
  - Land: 9.60 sq mi (24.86 km^{2})
  - Water: 0.054 sq mi (0.14 km^{2})
- Elevation: 541 ft (165 m)

Population (2020)
  - Total: 5,644
  - Estimate (2020): 5,644
  - Density: 567.3/sq mi (219.02/km^{2})
- Time zone: UTC-5 (EST)
  - Summer (DST): UTC-4 (EDT)
- Area code: 610
- FIPS code: 42-029-58808
- Website: www.penntownship.us

Penn Township is a township that is located in Chester County, Pennsylvania, United States. It is referred to as the "Nursery Capital of the World," and was the site of Sunset Park, one of country music's most popular venues.

The population was 5,644 at the time of the 2020 census.

== History ==
Penn Township was formed out of a division of Londonderry Township in 1817, as a second-class township.

== Government ==
As a second-class township, Penn Township is governed by a board of supervisors composed of five at-large members with six year terms.

== Geography ==
According to the United States Census Bureau, the township has an area of 9.6 square miles (25 km^{2}), all land.

== Demographics ==
Historical population
Census	Pop.	Note	%±
1930	537		—
1940	588		9.5%
1950	705		19.9%
1960	1,097		55.6%
1970	989		−9.8%
1980	1,888		90.9%
1990	2,257		19.5%
2000	2,812		24.6%
2010	5,364		90.8%
2020	5,644		5.2%

At the time of the 2010 census, the township was 86.3% non-Hispanic White, 2.9% Black or African American, 0.1% Native American, 1.6% Asian, 0.1% Native Hawaiian or other Pacific Islander, and 1.1% were defined as two or more races. 8.1% of the population was of Hispanic or Latino ancestry.

According to the 2000 census there were 2,812 people, 1,026 households, and 759 families living in the township.

The population density was 293.2 inhabitants per square mile (113.2/km^{2}). There were 1,093 housing units at an average density of 114.0 per square mile (44.0/km^{2}).

The racial makeup of the township was 93.24% White, 2.67% African American, 0.18% Native American, 0.32% Asian, 2.31% from other races, and 1.28% from two or more races. Hispanic or Latino of any race made up 5.90% of the population.

There were 1,026 households. 31.8% had children under the age of eighteen, 64.2% were married couples living together, 7.2% had a female householder with no husband present, and 26.0% were non-families. 23.0% of households were made up of individuals, and 13.1% were one-person households with residents who were aged sixty-five or older.

The average household size was 2.65 and the average family size was 3.13.

The age distribution was 24.6% of residents who were under the age of eighteen, 5.5% of residents who were aged eighteen to twenty-four, 27.2% who were aged twenty-five to forty-four, 22.3% who were aged forty-five to sixty-four, and 20.4% who were aged sixty-five or older. The median age was forty-one years.

For every one hundred females, there were 97.6 males. For every one hundred females who were aged eighteen or older, there were 95.3 males.

The median household income was $57,949 and the median family income was $68,938. Males had a median income of $46,298 compared with that of $30,880 for females.

The per capita income for the township was $26,346.

Approximately 3.0% of families and 6.2% of the population were living below the poverty line, including 4.9% of those who were under the age of eighteen and 11.9% of those who were aged sixty-five or older.

== Transportation ==
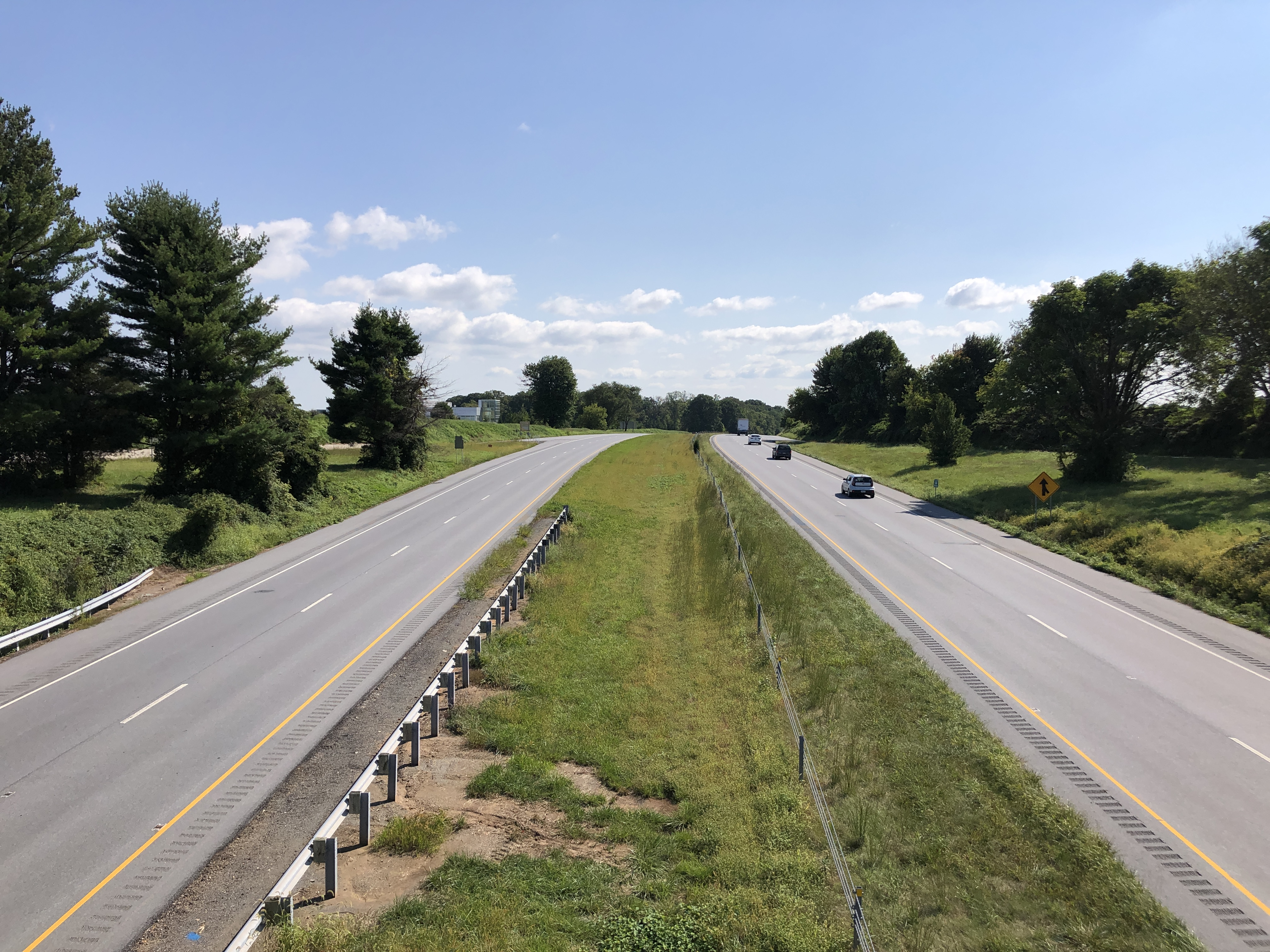
US 1 northbound in Penn Township

As of 2020, there were 41.18 miles (66.27 km) of public roads in Penn Township, of which 11.79 miles (18.97 km) were maintained by the Pennsylvania Department of Transportation (PennDOT) and 29.39 miles (47.30 km) were maintained by the township.

U.S. Route 1 is the most prominent highway serving Penn Township. It follows the Kennett Oxford Bypass along an east–west alignment through the middle of the township. Pennsylvania Route 796 also passes through the middle of the township, following Jennersville Road along a north–south alignment.

Pennsylvania Route 896 follows Newark Road along a northwest–southeast alignment across the southwestern corner of the township.
