= Jennersville, Pennsylvania =

Unincorporated community in Pennsylvania, US

- Unincorporated community
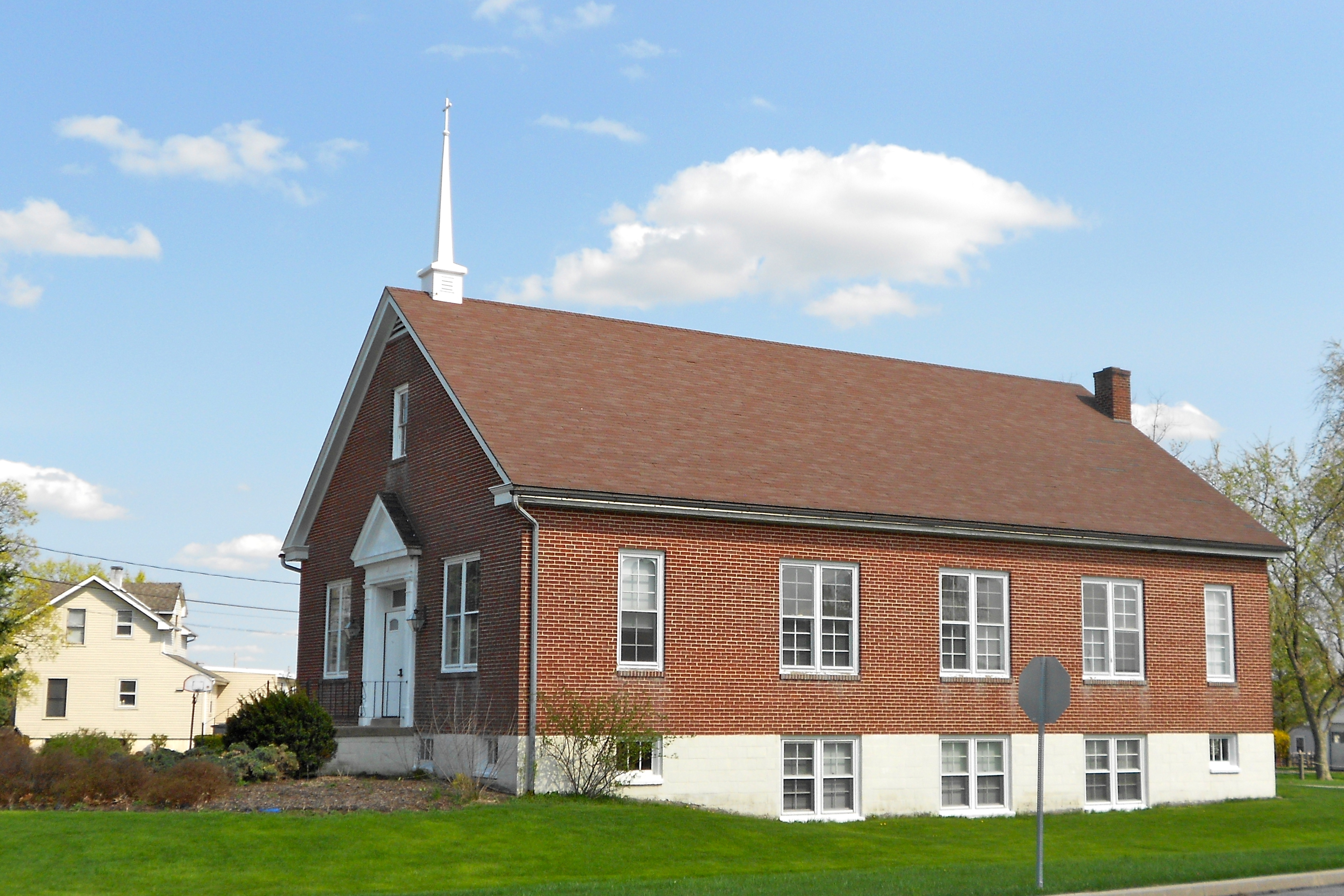
- Jennersville Church of the Brethren

- Location within Pennsylvania Location within the United States
- Coordinates: 39°49′23″N 75°52′11″W
- Country: United States
- State: Pennsylvania
- County: Chester
- Township: Penn
- Elevation: 581 ft (177 m)
- Time zone: UTC-5 (Eastern (EST))
  - Summer (DST): UTC-4 (EDT)
- ZIP code: 19390
- Area codes: 610 and 484
- GNIS feature ID: 1203138

Jennersville is an unincorporated community that is located in Penn Township, Chester County, Pennsylvania, United States at latitude 39.823 and longitude -75.87. It is associated, for postal purposes, with the borough of West Grove, and appears on the West Grove U.S. Geological Survey Map.

== History ==
The Jennersville Church of the Brethren and a 105,000-square-foot shopping center are located in Jennersville. Developers of the shopping center have estimated that 10,500 people live within three miles of the center, 23,800 within five miles, and 44,000 within seven miles, based on 2000 U.S. Census data.

Delaware County Community College provides classes at the Pennocks Bridge Campus through a partnership with the Chester County Intermediate Unit.

The Jennersville Hospital closed on December 31, 2021.

== Geography ==
The town's elevation is 577 feet (176 m).

== Notable people ==
- Eva Griffith Thompson (1842–1925), newspaper editor
- Shaun Taylor-Corbett (b. 1978), actor and singer
