= Joshua Hartshorne =

American politician (1808–1884)

Member of the Pennsylvania House of Representatives from the Chester County district
- In office 1840–1840 Serving with Joseph Baily, John Morgan, Joel Swayne
- Preceded by: Maurice Richardson, Richard M. Barnard, William K. Correy, Beynard Way
- Succeeded by: John D. Steele, William K. Correy, John B. Chrisman, Emmor Elton, Robert Laverty, Robert Futhey

Personal details
- Born: June 17, 1808 Cecil County, Maryland, U.S.
- Died: August 9, 1884 (aged 76) West Chester, Pennsylvania, U.S.
- Party: Democratic
- Spouse: Martha Rogers (m. 1846)
- Children: 5
- Occupation: Politician; merchandiser; iron worker; farmer

Joshua Hartshorne (June 17, 1808 – August 9, 1884) was an American politician from Pennsylvania. He served as a member of the Pennsylvania House of Representatives, representing Chester County in 1840.

== Early life ==
Joshua Hartshorne was born on June 17, 1808, in Cecil County, Maryland, to Mary (née Gillispie) and Jonathan Hartshorne. His uncle John Hartshorne served as a colonel in the Revolutionary War. Hartshorne's father died at a young age. He studied under Reverend Magraw at the West Nottingham Academy.

== Career ==
Hartshorne moved with his brother James to Chester County, Pennsylvania, to pursue a career in merchandising. He first moved to Chatham and then moved to Cochranville. He remained in Cochranville until 1846.

Hartshorne was a Democrat. He served as a member of the Pennsylvania House of Representatives, representing Chester County in 1840. In 1844, he became a member of the state board of railroad and canal commissioners and served as president of the board for three years.

In 1848, he moved to Baltimore and worked in the iron business. In 1865, he moved his family back to Chester County. He continued working in Baltimore until 1870. He owned a farm in Cochranville.

== Personal life ==
Hartshorne married Martha Rogers of Chester County on November 4, 1846. She was the daughter of Isaac Rogers, an ironmaster of Harford County, Maryland. They had two sons and three daughters, Walter, Caroline, Mary Rogers, Mrs. McGraw and Allen Stanley. He was a Presbyterian.

Hartshorne died on August 9, 1884, at his home in West Chester.
