= John Alexander Morrison =

American politician

John Alexander Morrison (January 31, 1814 – July 25, 1904) was a Democratic member of the U.S. House of Representatives from Pennsylvania.

== Formative years ==
John A. Morrison was born in Colerain Township, Lancaster County, Pennsylvania on January 31, 1814. He studied medicine and graduated from the Jefferson Medical College in Philadelphia, Pennsylvania in 1837, and commenced practice in Cochranville, Pennsylvania.

Morrison was elected as a Democrat to the Thirty-second Congress. He was subsequently appointed as inspector and appraiser of imports of drugs at the port of Philadelphia from 1853 to 1861. He then resumed his practice of medicine in Cochranville from 1861 to 1865.

== Later years, death and interment ==
Morrison also engaged in agricultural and mercantile pursuits and died in Cochranville in 1904. Interment in Fagg's Manor Presbyterian Church Cemetery in Londonderry Township, Chester County, Pennsylvania.

== Sources ==
- United States Congress. "John Alexander Morrison (id: M000997)". Biographical Directory of the United States Congress.
- The Political Graveyard

U.S. House of Representatives
Preceded by Jesse C. Dickey	Member of the U.S. House of Representatives from Pennsylvania's 7th congressional district 1851–1853	Succeeded by Samuel A. Bridges
