= Beitler =

Beitler is a surname. Notable people with the surname include:

- John Beitler (died 1873), American politician from Pennsylvania
- Ronald Beitler (born 1977), Dutch racer
