= Kaolin, Pennsylvania =

Unincorporated community in Pennsylvania, U.S.

Coordinates: 39°47′55″N 75°43′38″W

Kaolin is an unincorporated community in Chester County in southeastern Pennsylvania, United States. The community is located on Pennsylvania Route 41 between Avondale to the northwest and Hockessin, Delaware to the southeast.

== Etymology ==
Kaolin was named after the valuable deposits of kaolin in the vicinity.
