= Pennsylvania Route 41 =

State highway in Pennsylvania, US

Pennsylvania Route 41
- Gap–Newport Pike

Route information
- Maintained by PennDOT
- Length: 22.220 mi (35.760 km)

Major junctions
- South end: DE 41 in Kennett Township
- US 1 near Avondale; PA 841 in Chatham; PA 926 in Londonderry Township; PA 796 in Londonderry Township; PA 10 in Cochranville; PA 372 in Atglen; PA 741 in Gap
- North end: US 30 in Gap

Location
- Country: United States
- State: Pennsylvania
- Counties: Chester, Lancaster

Highway system
- Pennsylvania State Route System; Interstate; US; State; Scenic; Legislative
← US 40	→ PA 42

Pennsylvania Route 41 (PA 41) is a 22-mile-long (35 km) state highway located in southeastern Pennsylvania, United States. The southern terminus of the route is at the Delaware state line in Kennett Township, where the road continues as Delaware Route 41 (DE 41). The northern terminus is at U.S. Route 30 (US 30) in Gap. PA 41 runs northwest-southeast along a two-lane undivided road called Gap–Newport Pike, passing through mostly rural areas of Chester and Lancaster counties and serving Avondale, Chatham, Cochranville, and Atglen. The route serves as part of the main road linking Wilmington, Delaware, to Lancaster, Pennsylvania.

The Gap and Newport Turnpike was charted in 1807 to run from Gap southeast to the Delaware border, where it was to continue to Newport, Delaware. PA 41 was first designated in 1926 to run between US 22/PA 3/PA 13 in Harrisburg and US 22/PA 3 and US 120/PA 13 in Reading, following US 230 between Harrisburg and Lancaster and US 222 between Lancaster and Reading. PA 41 was rerouted at Lancaster to run southeast to the Delaware border in 1928, heading south from Lancaster to Lampeter along US 222/PA 72 before it turned east to Gap and southeast along the Gap Newport Pike. The western terminus was cut back to US 222 in Lampeter by 1930 while PA 741 was designated from PA 41 north to US 30 in Gap. PA 41 was rerouted to US 30 by 1940 while PA 741 was designated on the former alignment between US 222 in Lampeter and Gap.

== Route description ==
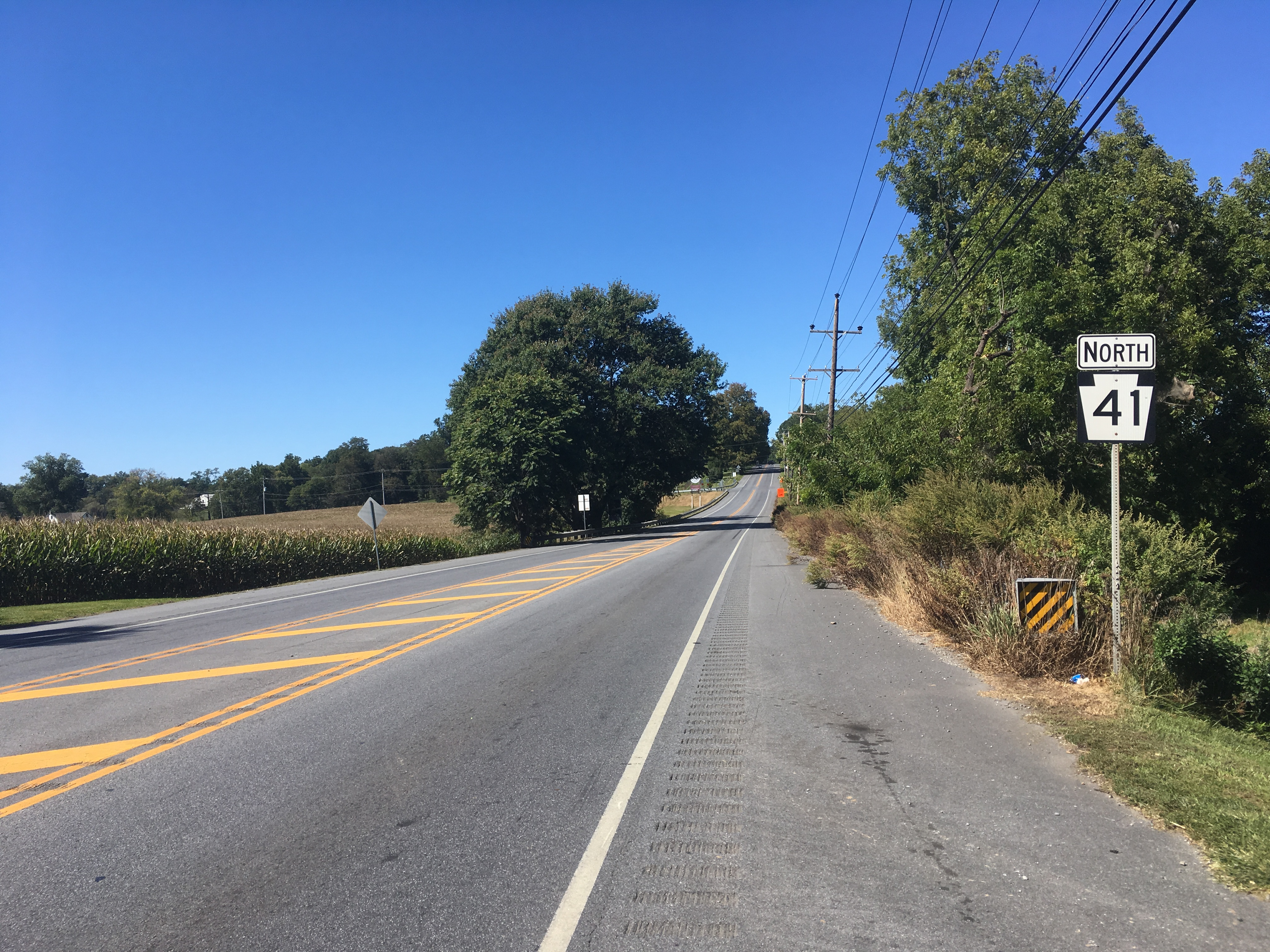
PA 41 northbound past the US 1 interchange in London Grove Township

PA 41 begins at the Delaware state line in Kennett Township, Chester County, where the road continues into that state as DE 41 and heads toward the city of Wilmington. From the state line, the route heads northwest on two-lane undivided Gap Newport Pike, passing through farmland with some development. The road enters New Garden Township and comes to a partial cloverleaf interchange with Limestone Road, which heads south to the Delaware border and becomes DE 7. PA 41 continues northwest through more rural areas with some homes and businesses, crossing Newark Road. Then route heads into the borough of Avondale, where it crosses an East Penn Railroad line at-grade and comes to an intersection with Baltimore Pike. Here, the road becomes Pennsylvania Avenue and crosses the East Branch White Clay Creek, running through wooded residential areas. PA 41 leaves Avondale for London Grove Township and becomes Gap Newport Pike again, passing near homes and farmland before Baltimore Pike heads to the west. The route continues through commercial areas before coming to a diamond interchange with the US 1 freeway.

Following this, the road runs through agricultural areas with some woods and homes. In the community of Chatham, the route passes residences and businesses, reaching an intersection with PA 841. The road briefly gains a median on either side of Chatham. PA 41 continues through more rural areas and enters Londonderry Township, where it comes to a junction with PA 926. A short distance later, the road reaches a junction with the northern terminus of PA 796. The route runs through more farmland with some woodland and residences, crossing into West Fallowfield Township. Here, PA 41 comes to the community of Cochranville, where it crosses PA 10. After Cochranville, the road heads through more open farmland with some patches of woods and homes. The route climbs a hill, gaining a northbound truck lane, before narrowing back to two lanes and passing to the west of Octorara Junior-Senior High School. PA 41 descends a hill, with a second southbound truck lane, before it becomes a two-lane road again. The route briefly passes through a corner of West Sadsbury Township before it enters the borough of Atglen and comes to an intersection with PA 372. Following this, PA 41 becomes a divided highway and heads into wooded areas, turning into an undivided road again as it comes to a bridge over Amtrak's Keystone Corridor railroad line and Swan Road. The road curves northwest and crosses back into West Sadsbury Township, passing through a mix of farm fields and development. The route heads down a hill, with an additional southbound truck lane, before it returns to two lanes.

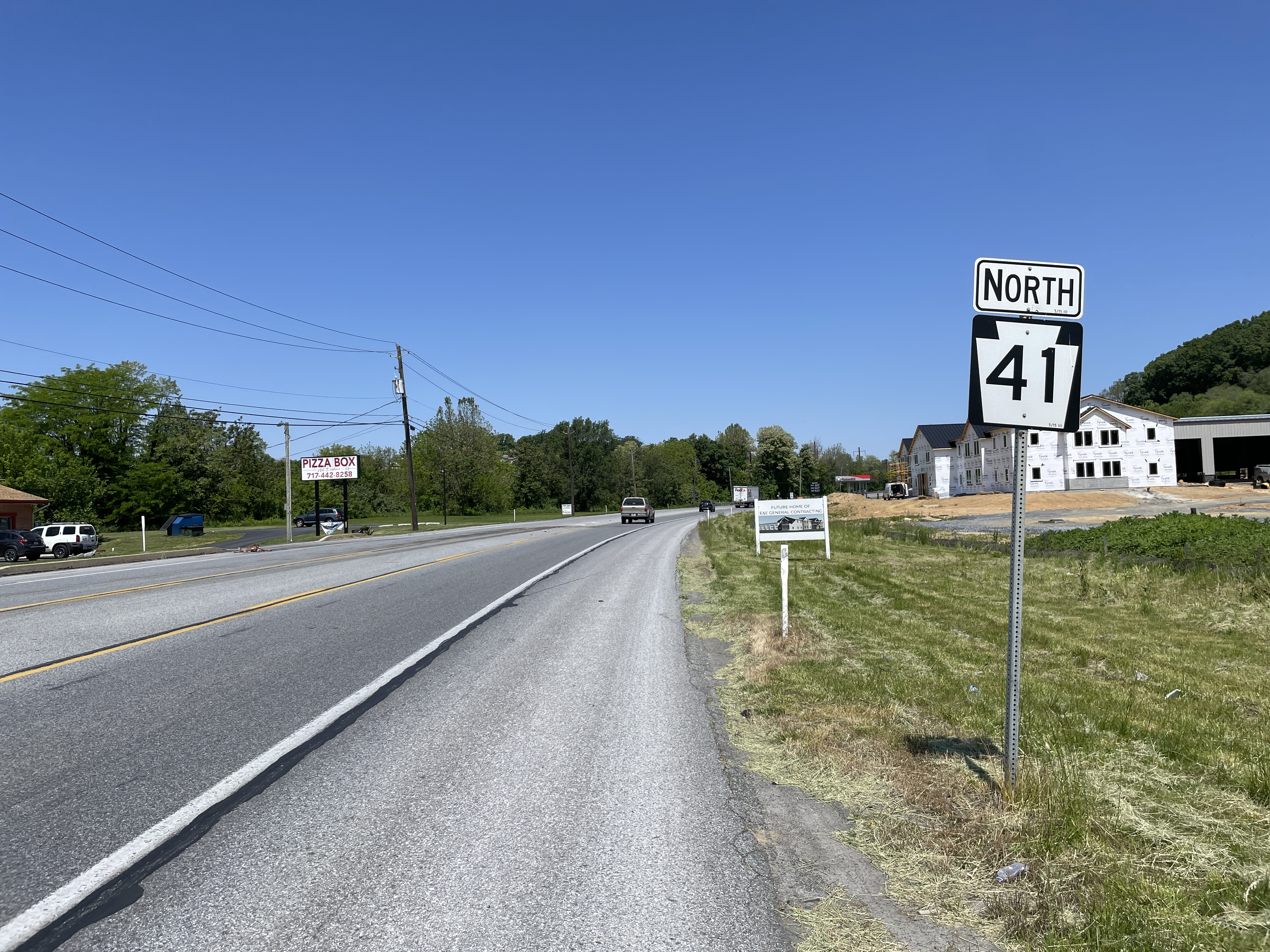
PA 41 northbound approaching Gap

PA 41 crosses Pine Creek into Sadsbury Township in Lancaster County. At this point, the route enters the Pennsylvania Dutch Country of eastern Lancaster County, which is home to many Amish farms. The roadway heads west past homes and businesses as it bypasses the borough of Christiana to the north, briefly gaining a center left-turn lane. The road curves to the north-northwest and passes through a mix of farms and woods with some commercial development a short distance to the east of the Amtrak line, becoming a three-lane road with a center left-turn lane. The route heads north and crosses into Salisbury Township, where it enters the residential community of Gap and has a junction with Strasburg Road before it gains a second southbound travel lane. In Gap, the road reaches an intersection with the eastern terminus of PA 741. PA 41 heads into business areas and comes to its northern terminus at a junction with US 30 (Lincoln Highway), which provides access to the city of Lancaster to the west.

PA 41 serves as part of the main route connecting Wilmington to Lancaster and sees heavy truck traffic. Because the route is two lanes wide and carries high levels of local and through traffic, it experiences a high accident rate. Portions of PA 41 prone to aggressive driving have white dots painted along the travel lanes in order to reduce tailgating by telling motorists to keep a minimum of two dots from the vehicle in front of them. In 2015, PA 41 had an annual average daily traffic count ranging from a high of 14,000 vehicles between the Delaware border and US 1 and between PA 796 and PA 10 to a low of 9,100 vehicles between PA 926 and PA 796. The entire length of PA 41 is part of the National Highway System.

== History ==
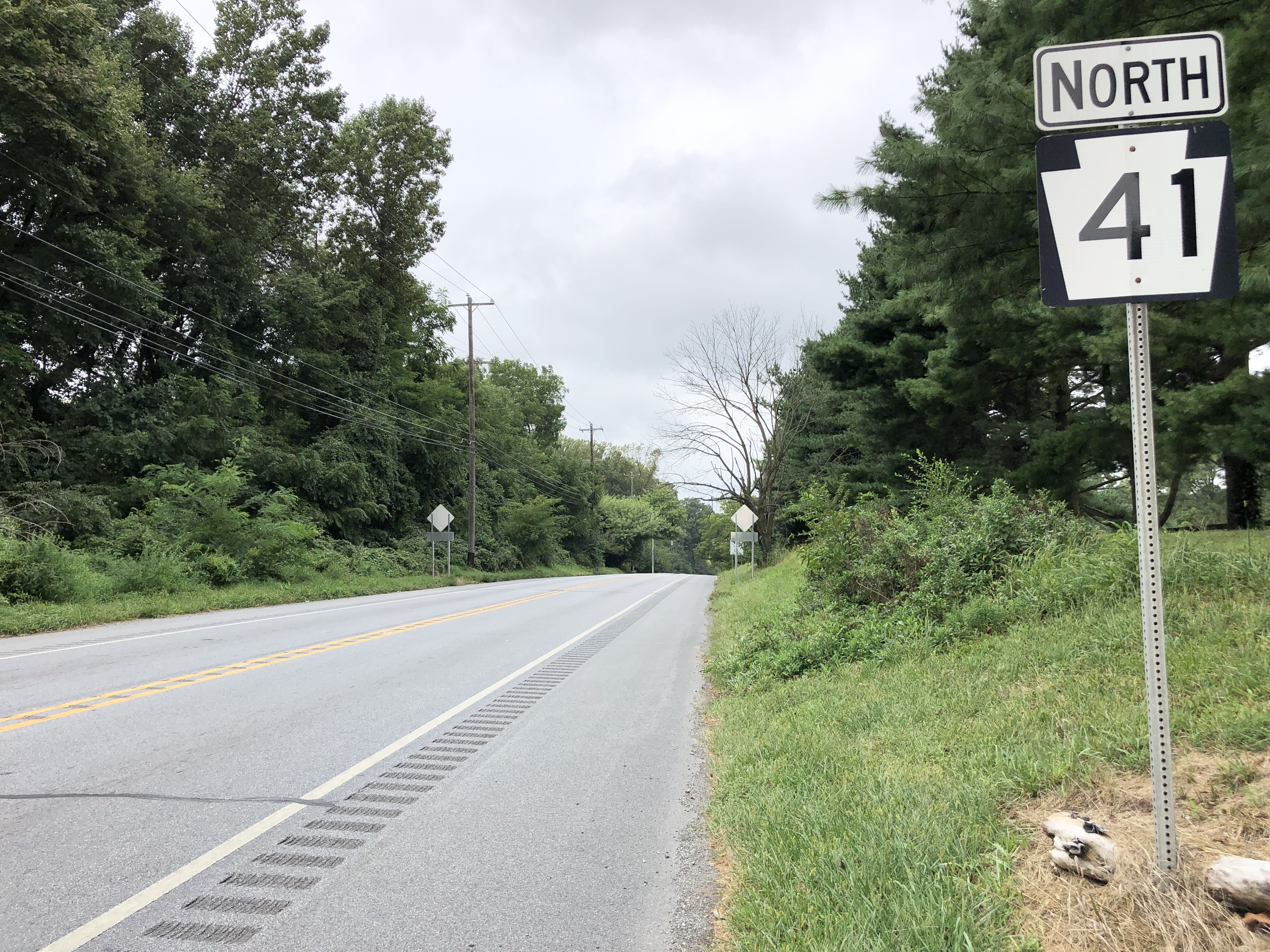
PA 41 northbound past PA 796 in Londonderry Township

On April 7, 1807, the state of Pennsylvania chartered the Gap and Newport Turnpike to run from the Philadelphia and Lancaster Turnpike in Gap southeast toward Delaware, where it was to continue to the Christina River in Newport, Delaware. The continuation into Delaware was chartered on January 30, 1808. Construction of the Gap and Newport Turnpike began in 1809 and was completed in 1818. The turnpike was created to improve trade between Lancaster County and Wilmington, Delaware. When Pennsylvania first legislated routes in 1911, the Gap Newport Pike along with the road running from Gap west to Lancaster were designated as Legislative Route 215. PA 41 was first designated in 1926 to run from US 22/PA 3/PA 13 in Harrisburg to US 22/PA 3 and US 120/PA 13 in Reading, heading southeast through Middletown, Elizabethtown, and Mount Joy to Lancaster, where it turned northeast and passed through Ephrata on its way to Reading. PA 41 ran concurrent with US 230 between Harrisburg and Lancaster and US 222 between Lancaster and Reading.

In 1928, PA 41 was rerouted at Lancaster to head southeast to the Delaware state line near Kaolin. The new alignment ran along US 222/PA 72 from Lancaster south and east to Lampeter, where PA 41 headed east through Strasburg to Gap. From Gap, PA 41 ran southeast along the Gap Newport Pike to the Delaware border. At this time, all of PA 41 was paved except for the portion between Strasburg and Gap. PA 240 replaced the PA 41 designation along the US 222 concurrency between Lancaster and Reading. By 1930, the western terminus of PA 41 was cut back to US 222 near Lampeter, removing the concurrences with US 230 and US 222, while the road from PA 41 in Gap north to US 30 was designated as PA 741. By this time, the route was paved from a point east of Strasburg east to Gap. The northern terminus of PA 41 was moved to its current location at US 30 by 1940, replacing PA 741. Meanwhile, PA 741 was designated onto the former alignment of PA 41 between US 222 near Lampeter and Gap. In 1954, PA 41 was rerouted to bypass Atglen and Christiana to the northeast along its current alignment, having previously followed current Fallowfield Road, Main Street, Zion Hill Road, and Newport Avenue. By 1959, PA 41 was realigned to the east of Cochranville, having previously passed through the community on current Cochran Street.

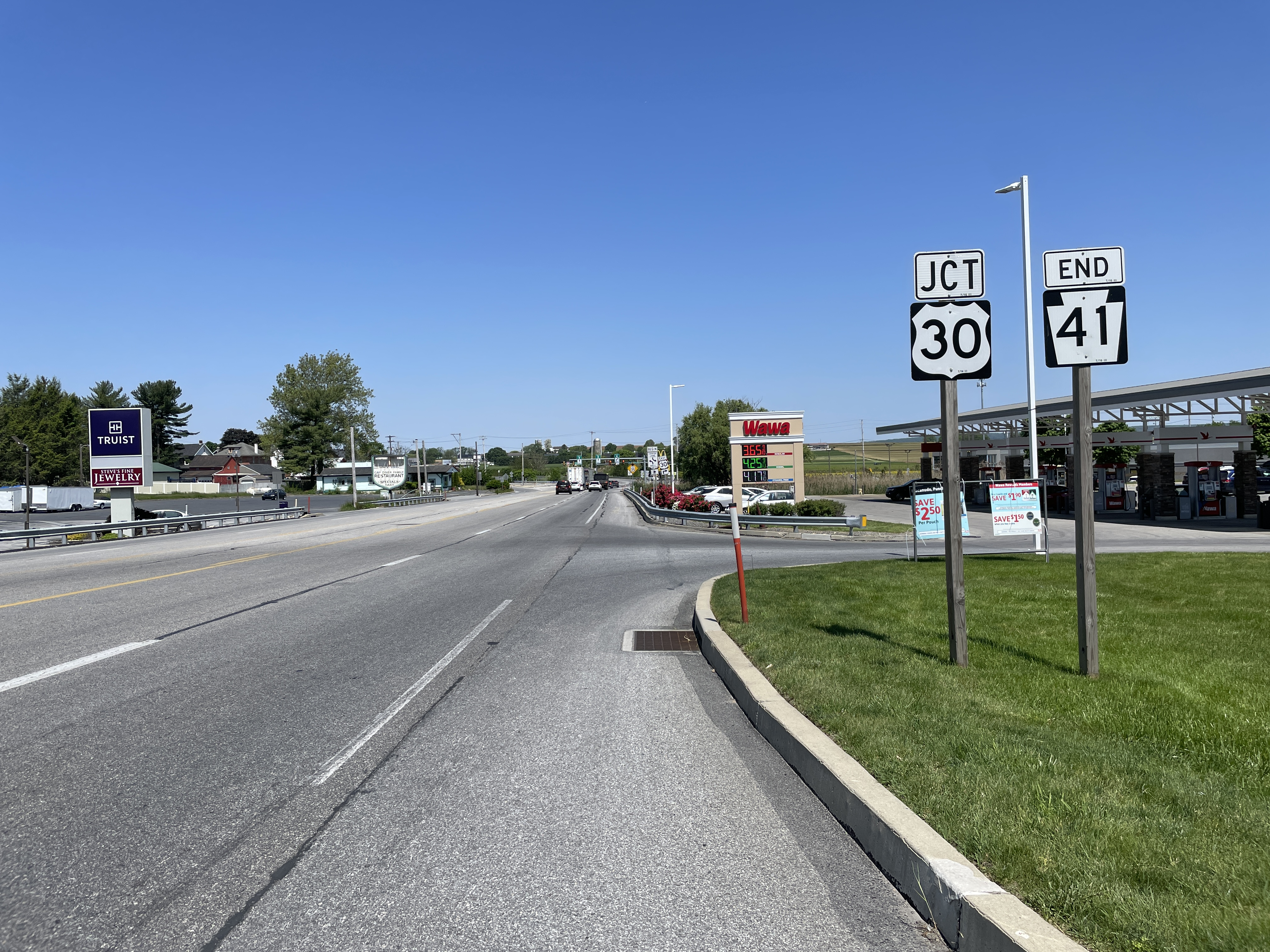
PA 41 northbound approaching terminus at US 30 in Gap

Because PA 41 has a high accident rate due to being two lanes wide and carrying a high amount of local and through traffic, plans were made to improve the road. A highway-needs study by planning officials in Chester County in 1986 said the route was "deficient" and needed to be improved. In 1993, the Pennsylvania Department of Transportation (PennDOT) began the process of planning improvements to the road to enhance safety and the movement of freight. Three options were presented in improving PA 41: building a bypass of Avondale, building a bypass of Chatham, and widening the route to four lanes between the Delaware border and PA 926. The widening and bypass plans drew the opposition of Governor Ed Rendell and an activist group called Safety Agricultures Village and Environment in 2003, both of whom instead supported a truck ban and traffic-calming measures such as roundabouts along the road. In 2003, PennDOT painted white dots in the travel lanes along portions of PA 41 prone to aggressive driving in order to reduce tailgating along with adding rumble strips. In September 2017, a project began to construct gateways at both the north and south ends of the village of Chatham which would consist of a short median in order to alert traffic they are entering the village. Widening of the road at the gateways was completed in fall 2017, with construction of the medians taking in spring 2018. There are also plans to improve safety and traffic flow at the route's intersections with PA 841 and PA 926; these projects are currently in the planning stages. On January 22, 2024, construction will begin on a roundabout at the PA 926 intersection in Londonderry Township. The roundabout is planned to cost $6.3 million and be completed in the later part of 2024.

== Major intersections ==
County	Location	mi	km	Destinations	Notes
Chester	Kennett Township	0.000	0.000	DE 41 south (Lancaster Pike) – Wilmington	Continuation into Delaware
Chester	New Garden Township	0.641	1.032	SR 3013 (Limestone Road) to DE 7 – Newport	Interchange
Chester	London Grove Township	5.816	9.360	US 1 (Kennett–Oxford Bypass) – Oxford, Kennett Square, Philadelphia	Interchange
Chester	London Grove Township	7.206	11.597	PA 841 (London Grove Road) – West Grove, Doe Run	
Chester	Londonderry Township	9.822	15.807	PA 926 (Street Road) – Russellville, Longwood	
Chester	Londonderry Township	10.413	16.758	PA 796 south (Jennersville Road)	Northern terminus of PA 796
Chester	West Fallowfield Township	13.130	21.131	PA 10 (Limestone Road) – Oxford, Parkesburg	
Chester	Atglen	17.740	28.550	PA 372 (Lower Valley Road) – Atglen, Parkesburg	
Lancaster	Gap	21.708	34.936	PA 741 west (Strasburg Road)	Eastern terminus of PA 741
Lancaster	Gap	22.220	35.760	US 30 (Lincoln Highway) – Lancaster, Coatesville	Northern terminus
1.000 mi = 1.609 km; 1.000 km = 0.621 mi

== PA 41 Alternate Truck ==
PA Route 41 Alternate Truck
- Location: Chester County, Pennsylvania
- Existed: 2025–present

Pennsylvania Route 41 Alternate Truck is a truck route bypassing a historic, weight-restricted bridge on mainline PA 41 over White Clay Creek in Avondale, Pennsylvania. On this bridge, trucks over 27 tons and combination loads over 40 tons are prohibited. The route follows Newark Road and US 1. It was signed in 2025.
