= John Beitler =

American politician (1780–1872)

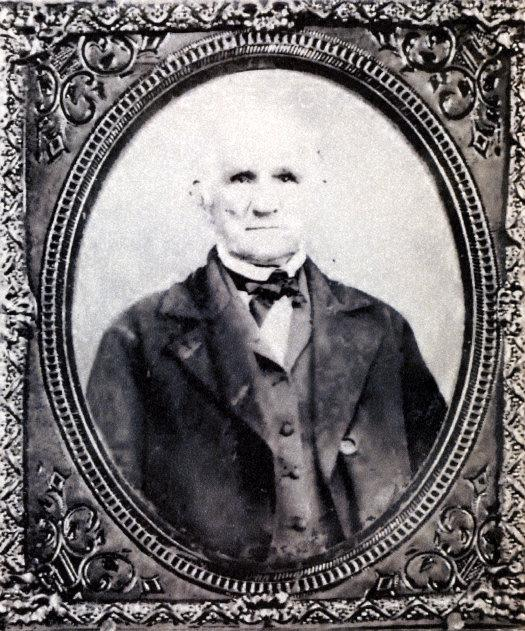

Member of the Pennsylvania House of Representatives from the Chester County district
- In office 1843–1843 Serving with Emmor Elton, Robert Parke, Jesse C. Dickey
- Preceded by: William K. Correy, Robert Futhey, Robert Laverty, Emmor Elton
- Succeeded by: Robert Parke, Jesse C. Dickey, Joseph Whitaker

Personal details
- Born: March 11, 1780 Lionville, Pennsylvania, U.S.
- Died: December 22, 1872 (aged 92) Lionville, Pennsylvania, U.S.
- Resting place: Uwchlan Friends Burial Ground, Uwchlan Township, Pennsylvania, U.S.
- Party: Whig; Republican
- Spouse: Anna Evans
- Children: 5
- Occupation: Politician; farmer

John Beitler (March 11, 1780 – December 22, 1872) was an American politician from Pennsylvania. He served as a member of the Pennsylvania House of Representatives, representing Chester County in 1843.

== Biography ==
John Beitler was born on March 11, 1780, in Lionville, Pennsylvania.

Beitler was a farmer. He was a Whig and Republican. He served as a Whig member of the Pennsylvania House of Representatives, representing Chester County in 1843. He also held local political offices in his township.

Beitler married Anna Evans. They had two sons and three daughters, John Jr., Jesse, Hannah, Mary and Sarah. His son John worked as postmaster. Beitler lived in Lionville. He died on December 22, 1872, in Lionville. He was buried at Uwchlan Friends Burial Ground.
