= Springton Manor Farm =

Historic district in Pennsylvania, United States

- U.S. National Register of Historic Places
- U.S. Historic district
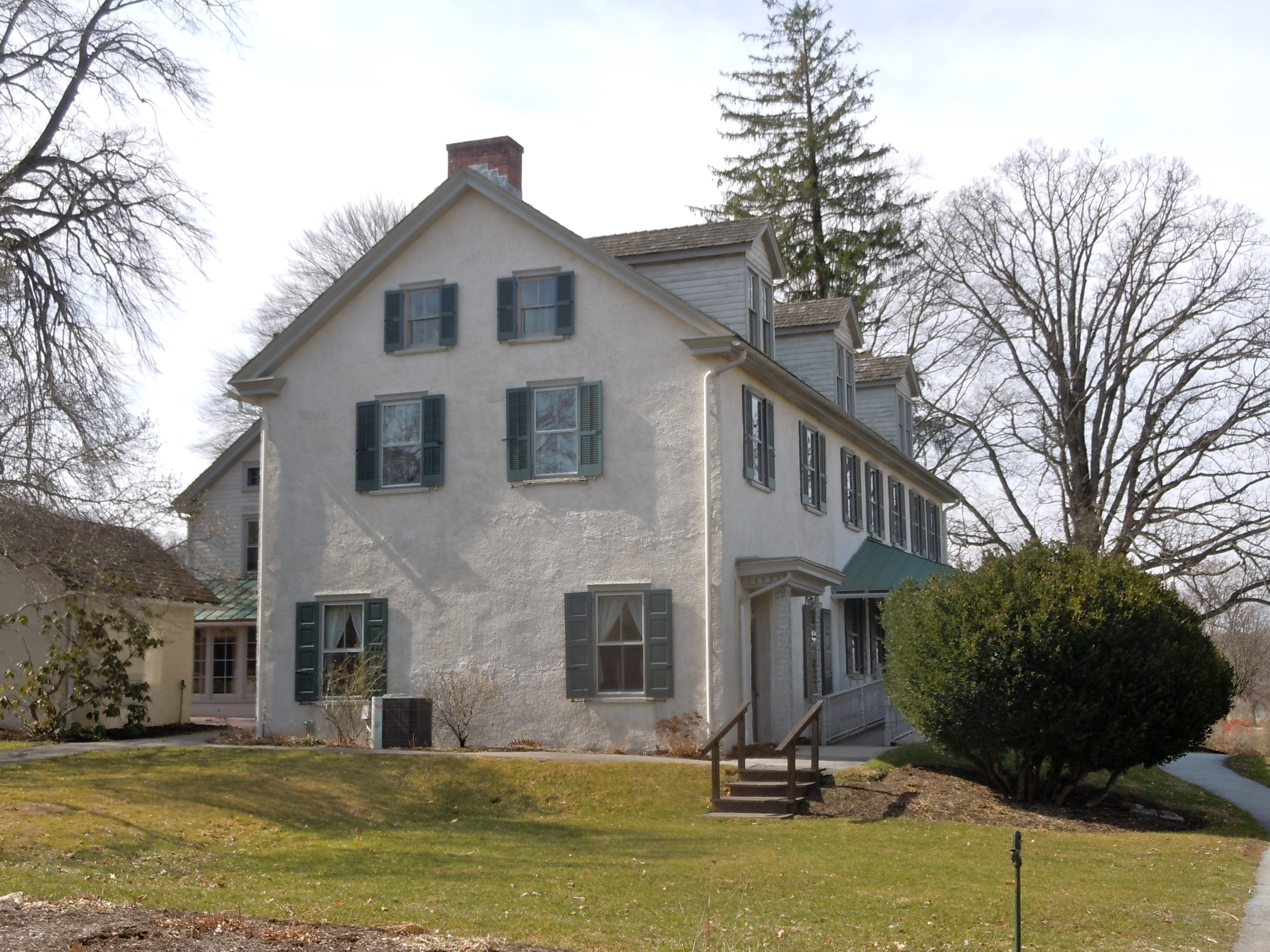
- Springton Manor, March 2011

- Location within Pennsylvania Location within the United States
- Location: South of Glenmoore at Springton and Creek Roads, Wallace Township, Pennsylvania
- Coordinates: 40°04′18″N 75°46′40″W
- Area: 260.5 acres (105.4 ha)
- Built: 1711
- Architect: Multiple
- Architectural style: Queen Anne, Georgian, Federal
- NRHP reference No.: 79002200
- Added to NRHP: August 7, 1979

The Springton Manor Farm is a historic farm and national historic district that is located in Wallace Township, Chester County, Pennsylvania, United States.

It was added to the National Register of Historic Places in 1979.

== History and architectural features ==
This property has fourteen contributing buildings, one contributing site, and five contributing structures. They include the main house, a cistern (c. 1870), a tool shed (c. 1850), an privy (c. 1840), a spring and milk house (c. 1836), a carriage house (c. 1840, 1887), a small barn (c. 1845), a corn crib (c. 1845), a bank barn (c. 1750), a stone lean-to (c. 1711, 1745), the ruins of a stone spring house (c. 1735), and hydraulic dams (c. 1870).

The main house was erected in three sections; the earliest dates to circa 1836, with additions and modifications made in 1887 and 1912. It is a two-and-one-half-story, seven-bay by two-bay, stuccoed stone dwelling with Georgian and Queen Anne style design details. It was the home of Congressman Abraham Robinson McIlvaine (1804-1863).

This property is administered as a park and agricultural history museum by Chester County.
