= Cierra Runge =

American swimmer (born 1996)

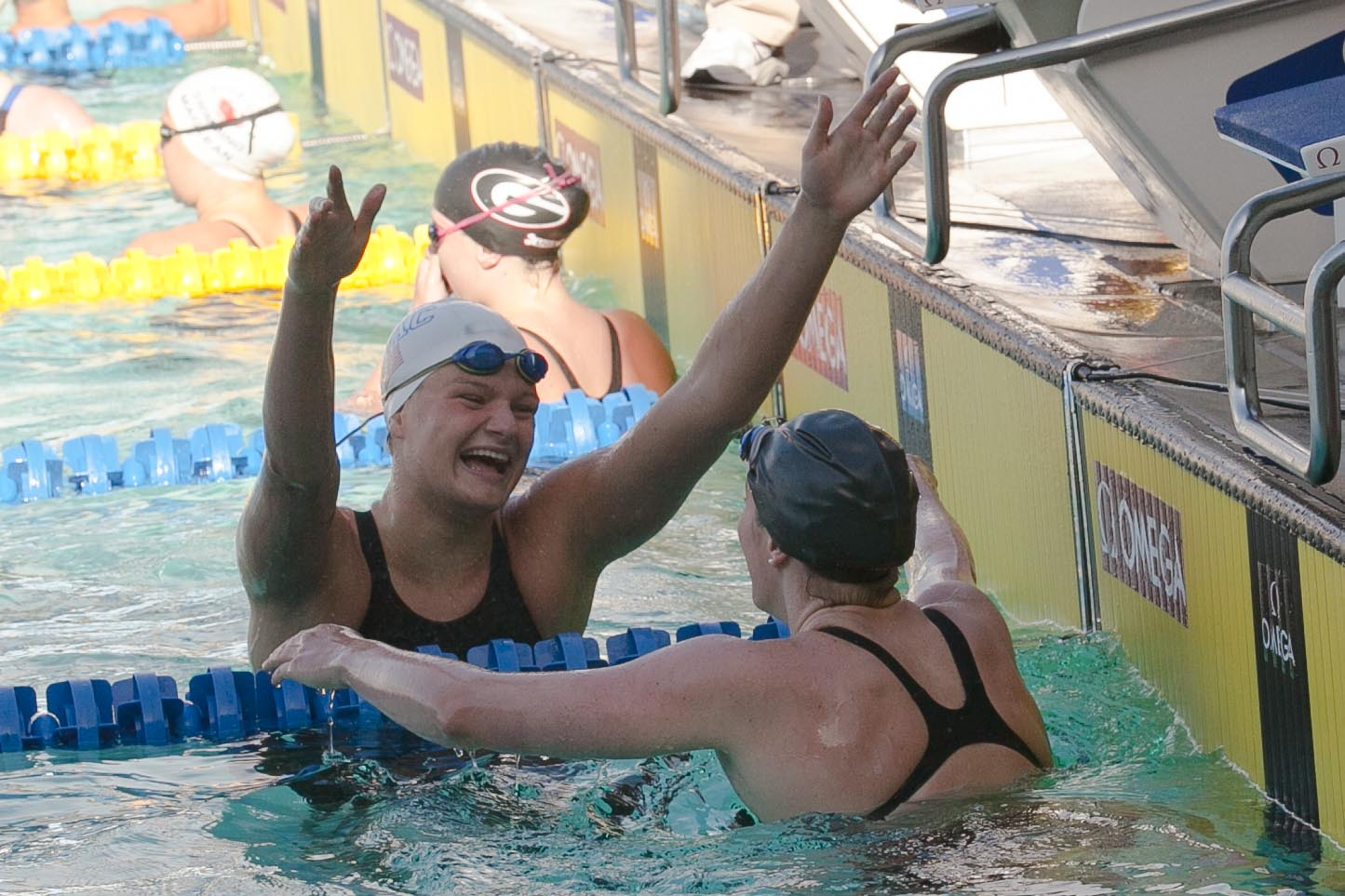
- Runge in 2014

Personal information
- National team: United States
- Born: March 7, 1996 (age 30) Cochranville, Pennsylvania, U.S.
- Height: 6 ft 2.5 in (189 cm)
- Weight: 187 lb (85 kg)

Sport
- Sport: Swimming
- Strokes: Freestyle
- Club: North Baltimore Aquatic Club
- College team: University of California, Berkeley (2014–2015); University of Wisconsin–Madison (2016–2017); Arizona State University (2018–2020)
- Coach: Bob Bowman
Medal record
Women's swimming
Representing the United States
Olympic Games
Gold medal – first place	2016 Rio de Janeiro	4×200 m freestyle
World Championships (LC)
Gold medal – first place	2015 Kazan	4×200 m freestyle
Gold medal – first place	2017 Budapest	4×200 m freestyle
Pan Pacific Championships
Silver medal – second place	2014 Gold Coast	400 m freestyle
Junior Pan Pacific Championships
Gold medal – first place	2012 Honolulu	4×100 m freestyle
Gold medal – first place	2012 Honolulu	4×200 m freestyle
Bronze medal – third place	2012 Honolulu	100 m freestyle

Cierra Runge (born March 7, 1996) is an American competition swimmer.

== Career ==
Runge was born in Cochranville, Pennsylvania, to Scott and Diane Runge. She is a 2014 graduate of Octorara High School. She was on the Jennersville YMCA swim team when she was younger (Now KJAY Swim Team). She attended the University of California, Berkeley her freshman year under Teri McKeever and afterwards took a whole year off to focus her efforts on making the 2016 U.S. Olympic team. Runge came back to collegiate swimming attending the University of Wisconsin-Madison, where she swam for head coach Whitney Hite. For her last two years of NCAA eligibility, she transferred to Arizona State University, where she worked with Bob Bowman.

At the 2012 United States Olympic Trials in Omaha, Nebraska, Runge placed 25th in the 100-meter freestyle and 26th in the 50-meter freestyle.

In 2013, she competed at the World Junior Swimming Championships and won four medals including gold in the 4x200-meter freestyle relay.

At the 2014 US National Championships, the qualifying meet for both the 2014 Pan Pacific Swimming Championships and the 2015 World Aquatics Championships, she finished second in the 400- and 800-meter freestyle, and 6th in the 200-meter freestyle.

At the 2014 Pan Pacific Swimming Championships in Gold Coast, Australia, Runge placed 2nd in the 400-meter freestyle, 4th in the 1500-meter freestyle, and 5th in the 800-meter freestyle. In the 400-meter freestyle, she finished behind teammate Katie Ledecky, who set a world record.

She most recently won a gold medal in the 2016 Rio Olympic Games in the 4 x 200 freestyle relay.
