= Chatham, Pennsylvania =

Unincorporated community in Pennsylvania, US

- Unincorporated community
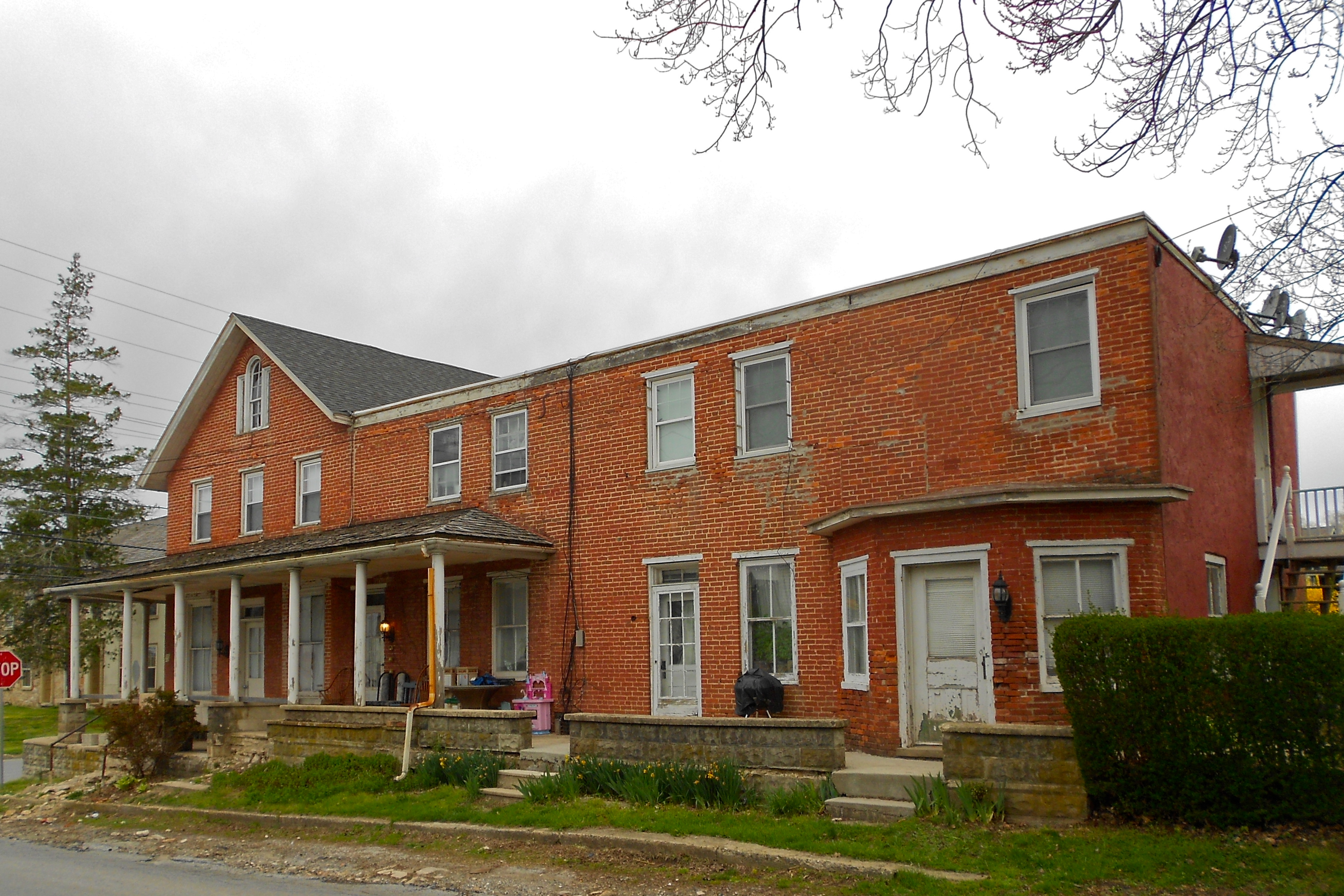
- House in Chatham

- Location in Pennsylvania Chatham (the United States)
- Coordinates: 39°51′12″N 75°49′18″W
- Country: United States
- State: Pennsylvania
- County: Chester
- Township: London Grove
- Elevation: 440 ft (130 m)
- Time zone: UTC-5 (Eastern (EST))
  - Summer (DST): UTC-4 (EDT)
- ZIP code: 19318
- Area codes: 610 and 484
- GNIS feature ID: 1171611

Chatham is an unincorporated community in London Grove Township in Chester County, Pennsylvania, United States. Chatham is located at the intersection of state routes 41 and 841.
