= Octorara Area School District =

School district in Pennsylvania

Location
- Atglen, Chester County, Pennsylvania; United States

District information
- Motto: Empowering Students to Build Successful Futures
- Established: 1956
- Superintendent: Dr. Steven Lever

Other information
- Website: octorara.k12.pa.us

The Octorara Area School District is a small, rural–urban fringe, public school district.

The Octorara Area School District was established in 1956 and is located in southeastern Pennsylvania, serving communities in Lancaster and Chester counties. Known as the "Home of the Braves," the district is classified by the United States Census Bureau as rural-urban fringe. Its service area includes eight municipalities: Atglen, Christiana Borough, Sadsbury Township, Parkesburg Borough, Highland Township, Londonderry Township, West Fallowfield Township and West Sadsbury Township.

The District covers a distance of 79.79 square miles and offers easy access along Route 41, just 10 miles south of Route 30 and 9 miles north of Route 1. It is centrally located within 30 miles of Lancaster, Reading, and Wilmington, Delaware.

The Octorara Area School District is governed by nine regionally elected school board members who employ a superintendent of schools, 17 administrators, 203 professional staff, and 157 support staff. Of the 203 faculty, 31 have over 20 years of experience, 16 have a Master’s degree or equivalent, and 5 have Doctorate degrees. Combined, the District’s teaching staff boasts an average of 12 years of experience.

Preparing students to achieve their goals after high school by supporting their academic, technical, and social/emotional needs is the Octorara Area School District’s main objective. Developing partnerships with families, business, industry, and the community continues to be an integral part of the District’s practice of maximizing opportunities for student success.

Its high school boys soccer team is its most successful athletics team having won 17 league championships, 2 district championships and 2 PIAA state championships in 1999 and 2009. The Pennsylvania Soccer Coaches Associations Coach of the Year Award was at one time named after former teacher and head boys soccer coach W. Gene Davis.

== District Emblem ==
The school emblem, designed by Hunter Gaul, appeared on the dedication brochure for the dedication of the first Octorara building on November 19, 1956. Each item on the emblem has significance.

Octorara Brave - Centers attention on the shared history of the area. Octorara became the official name of the district; the Brave became the school mascot.

Stalk of Wheat - Recognizes the agricultural nature of the area and the promise of a future harvest.

Seven Links of a Chain - Represent the seven local political entities now joined for a common educational purpose.

== History ==
The name "Octorara Area Schools" was officially selected at the May 4, 1953 meeting of the Board.

"Octorara" is a name that is Native American in origin and it is given to the two major streams that drain the area. Legend reports that the name refers to either "flowing waters" or to "the sun". The unique design of the proscenium arch above the high school stage is attributed to the architect's interpretation of the rising sun.

Octorara is a semi-rural community whose boundaries encompass parts of southwestern Chester County and southeastern Lancaster County. Within the school district can be found some of the richest agricultural land in the United States.

== Academic achievement ==
=== Graduation rate ===
Effective with the 2009–2010 school year, the Pennsylvania Department of Education (PDE) began implementation of a new methodology to calculate graduation rates for all public high schools, comprehensive Career and Technical Centers (CTCs) and charter schools that graduate students from 12th grade. Octorara Area School District's 2013-2-14 graduation rate was 91.88%, compared to the state average of 85.45%.

=== Graduate Data and statistics ===
The Pennsylvania Department of Education, Division of Data Quality, provides a compilation of statistical information covering high school graduates in Pennsylvania's public schools. Pennsylvania's public high schools with enrollment in grade 12; including secondary ungraded, provide the graduate data through the Pennsylvania Information Management System (PIMS).

Graduates Public 2013-14
Total Postsecondary Bound - 72.28%

Total College Bound - 71.2%
2- or 4- Year College or University - 63.04%
Specialized Associate Degree-Granting Institution- 8.15%
Non-Degree Granting Postsecondary - 1.09%

== Schools ==
- Octorara Primary Learning Center
- Octorara Elementary School
- Octorara Intermediate School
- Octorara Junior-Senior High School

== Notable alumni ==
- Ryan Vogelsong - World Series winning pitcher for the San Franciscio Giants
- Charles "Chip" Smallwood - player for the North American Soccer Leagues Portland Timbers
- Joshua Parsons - Lancsater County Pennsylvania Commissioner
- Cierra Runge - Olympic gold medal winning swimmer
- Rick Powell - member of US Olympic Kayak Team in 2013
