= Robert Futhey =

American politician (1789–1870)

Member of the Pennsylvania House of Representatives from the Chester County district
- In office 1841–1842 Serving with John D. Steele, William K. Correy, John B. Chrisman, Emmor Elton, Robert Laverty
- Preceded by: Joseph Baily, Joshua Hartshorne, John Morgan, Joel Swayne
- Succeeded by: Emmor Elton, Robert Parke, Jesse Column Dickey, John Beitler

Personal details
- Born: January 21, 1789
- Died: July 29, 1870 (aged 81)
- Party: Democratic
- Spouse: Margaret Parkinson
- Children: 6, inc. J. Smith Futhey
- Occupation: Politician

Robert Futhey (January 21, 1789 – July 29, 1870) was an American politician from Pennsylvania. He was a member of the Pennsylvania House of Representatives, representing Chester County from 1841 to 1842.

== Biography ==
Robert Futhey was born on January 21, 1789, to Martha (née Smith) and Samuel Futhey. His father served in the Revolutionary War.

Futhey served in the War of 1812 as a private. He was a Democrat. He was a member of the Pennsylvania House of Representatives, representing Chester County from 1841 to 1842. He had a farm in West Fallowfield Township.

Futhey married Margaret Parkinson of Carlisle. They had six children, John S., J. Smith, James L., Martha, Elizabeth J. and Robert. His son J. Smith Futhey was a judge and coauthor of The History of Chester County. He died on July 29, 1870.
