= John Westbrook (Pennsylvania politician) =

American politician

Abraham Robinson McIlvaine

Member of the U.S. House of Representatives from Pennsylvania's 7th district
- In office March 4, 1841 – March 3, 1843
- Preceded by: David D. Wagener
- Succeeded by: Abraham R. McIlvaine

Member of the Pennsylvania House of Representatives
- In office 1833

Personal details
- Born: January 9, 1789 Sussex County, New Jersey
- Died: October 8, 1852 (aged 63) Dingmans Ferry, Pennsylvania

John Westbrook (January 9, 1789 – October 8, 1852) was a Democratic member of the U.S. House of Representatives from Pennsylvania.

John Westbrook was born in Sussex County, New Jersey. He moved with his parents to Pike County, Pennsylvania, in 1792 and settled near Dingmans Ferry, Pennsylvania. He attended private schools and was engaged in lumbering and agricultural pursuits. He served as a colonel in the State militia in 1812 and as sheriff of Pike County in 1817. He was a member of the Pennsylvania House of Representatives in 1833.

Westbrook was elected as a Democrat to the Twenty-seventh Congress. He declined to be a candidate for reelection in 1842 to the Twenty-eighth Congress. He resumed agricultural pursuits and died near Dingmans Ferry in 1852. Interment in Laurel Hill Cemetery in Milford, Pennsylvania.

== Sources ==
- United States Congress. "John Westbrook (id: W000306)". Biographical Directory of the United States Congress.
- The Political Graveyard

U.S. House of Representatives
Preceded by David D. Wagener	Member of the U.S. House of Representatives from Pennsylvania's 7th congressional district 1841–1843	Succeeded by Abraham R. McIlvaine
