= 2014 Pan Pacific Swimming Championships – Women's 400 metre freestyle =

Women's 400 metre freestyle at the 2014 Pan Pacific Swimming Championships
- Venue: Gold Coast Aquatic Centre
- Dates: August 23, 2014 (heats & finals)
- Competitors: 22
- Winning time: 3:58.37

Medalists
gold medal	Katie Ledecky	United States
silver medal	Cierra Runge	United States
bronze medal	Lauren Boyle	New Zealand

The women's 400 metre freestyle competition at the 2014 Pan Pacific Swimming Championships took place on August 23 at the Gold Coast Aquatic Centre. The last champion was Chloe Sutton of United States.

This race consisted of eight lengths of the pool, with all eight being in the freestyle stroke.

== Records ==
Prior to this competition, the existing world and Pan Pacific records were as follows:

World record	Katie Ledecky (USA)	3:58.86	Irvine, United States	August 9, 2014
Pan Pacific Championships record	Janet Evans (USA)	4:04.53	Tokyo, Japan	August 19, 1989

== Results ==
All times are in minutes and seconds.

KEY:	q	Fastest non-qualifiers	Q	Qualified	CR	Championships record	NR	National record	PB	Personal best	SB	Seasonal best

=== Heats ===
The first round was held on August 23, at 10:47.

Rank	Name	Nationality	Time	Notes
1	Katie Ledecky	United States	4:03.09	QA, CR
2	Cierra Runge	United States	4:06.73	QA
3	Andreina Pinto	Venezuela	4:07.48	QA
4	Leah Smith	United States	4:07.77	QA
5	Becca Mann	United States	4:08.50	QA
5	Lauren Boyle	New Zealand	4:08.64	QA
7	Bronte Barratt	Australia	4:09.30	QA
8	Alanna Bowles	Australia	4:09.53	QA
9	Brittany MacLean	Canada	4:09.75	QB
10	Jessica Ashwood	Australia	4:12.08	QB
11	Samantha Cleverton	Canada	4:14.44	QB
12	Aya Takano	Japan	4:14.63	QB
13	Chihi Igarashi	Japan	4:16.28	QB
14	Emma Robinson	New Zealand	4:16.63	QB
14	Yasuk Miyamoto	Japan	4:16.63	QB
16	Alyson Ackman	Canada	4:16.67	QB
17	Samantha Lucie-Smith	New Zealand	4:18.49	
18	Tabitha Baumann	Canada	4:20.20	
19	Miho Takahashi	Japan	4:21.09	
20	Liu Yiru	China	4:22.99	
21	Leonora Parmeleau	Canada	4:30.18	
22	Hei Tung Cheng	Hong Kong	4:35.49	

=== B Final ===
The B final was held on August 23, at 20:04.

Rank	Name	Nationality	Time	Notes
9	Leah Smith	United States	4:06.91	
10	Jessica Ashwood	Australia	4:10.14	
11	Chihi Igarashi	Japan	4:13.72	
12	Samantha Lucie-Smith	New Zealand	4:15.19	
13	Emma Robinson	New Zealand	4:15.92	
14	Aya Takano	Japan	4:16.07	
15	Yasuk Miyamoto	Japan	4:16.38	
16	Tabitha Baumann	Canada	4:23.47	

=== A Final ===
The A final was held on August 23, at 20:04.

Rank	Name	Nationality	Time	Notes
1st place, gold medalist(s)	Katie Ledecky	United States	3:58.37	WR
2nd place, silver medalist(s)	Cierra Runge	United States	4:04.55	
3rd place, bronze medalist(s)	Lauren Boyle	New Zealand	4:05.33	
4	Brittany MacLean	Canada	4:05.91	
5	Andreina Pinto	Venezuela	4:07.51	
6	Bronte Barratt	Australia	4:10.40	
7	Alanna Bowles	Australia	4:10.58	
8	Samantha Cleverton	Canada	4:12.25	
