= Bridge in West Fallowfield Township =

- U.S. National Register of Historic Places
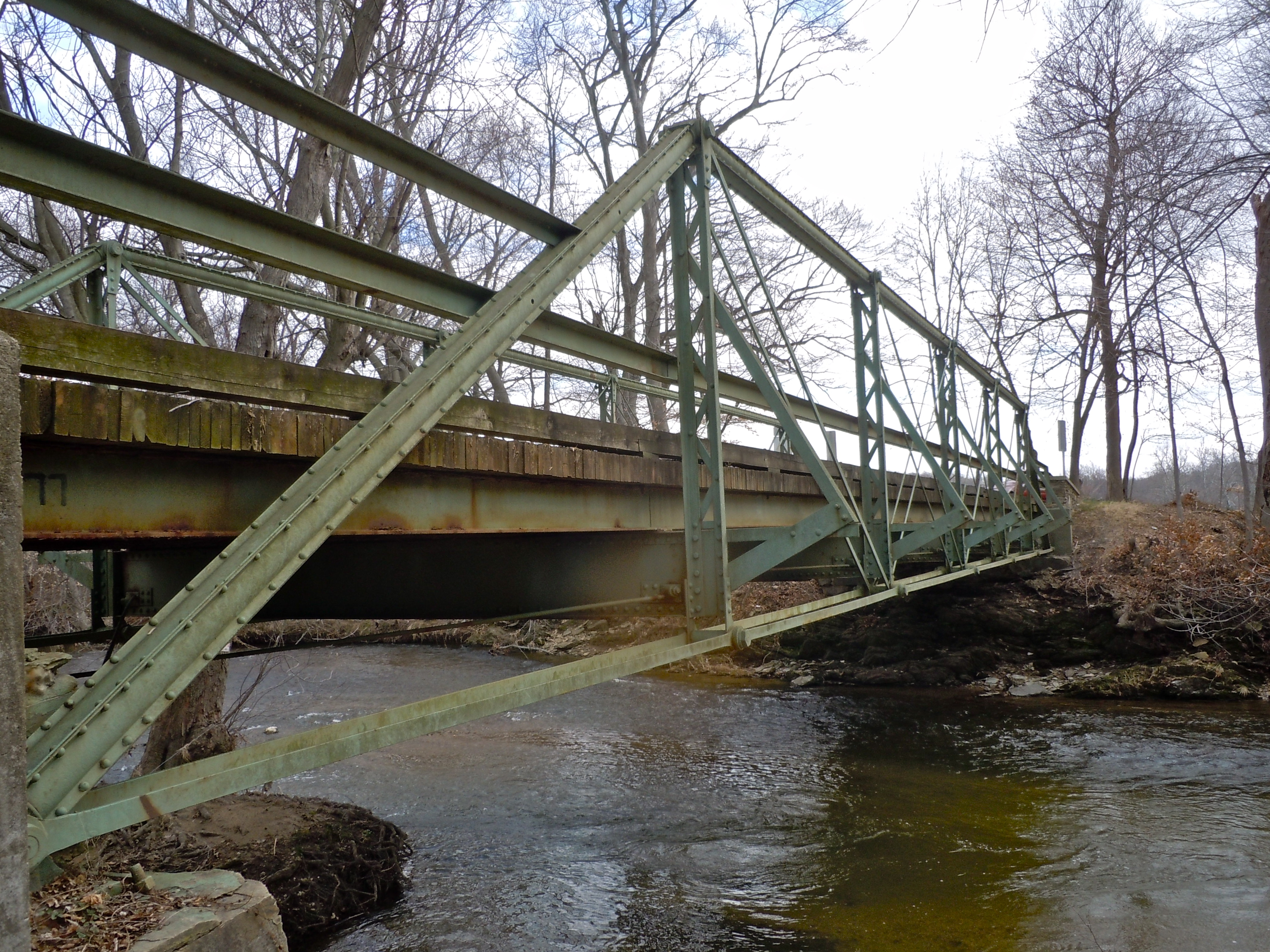
- West Fallowfield Bridge, March 2011

- Location within Pennsylvania Location within the United States
- Location: Ross Fording Road over Octoraro Creek, near Steelville, West Fallowfield Township, Pennsylvania
- Coordinates: 39°52′58″N 75°59′31″W
- Area: less than one acre
- Built: 1885
- Built by: James Denithorne, Phoenix Steel
- Architectural style: Pratt pony truss
- MPS: Highway Bridges Owned by the Commonwealth of Pennsylvania, Department of Transportation TR
- NRHP reference No.: 88000849
- Added to NRHP: June 22, 1988

Bridge in West Fallowfield Township is a historic steel Pratt pony truss bridge located in West Fallowfield Township, Chester County, Pennsylvania. It spans Octoraro Creek. It has a single span, 85-foot-long (26 m). The bridge was constructed in 1885, by the Phoenix Bridge Company, Phoenixville, Pennsylvania.

It was listed on the National Register of Historic Places in 1988.
