= David D. Wagener =

American politician

David Douglas Wagener

Member of the U.S. House of Representatives from Pennsylvania's 7th district
- In office March 4, 1833 – March 3, 1841
- Preceded by: Henry A. P. Muhlenberg
- Succeeded by: John Westbrook

Personal details
- Born: October 11, 1792 Easton, Pennsylvania, U.S.
- Died: October 1, 1860 (aged 67) Easton, Pennsylvania, U.S.
- Party: Democratic Party

David Douglas Wagener (October 11, 1792 – October 1, 1860) was a member of the U.S. House of Representatives from Pennsylvania.

== Biography ==
Wagener was born in Easton, Pennsylvania on October 11, 1792. He was captain of the Easton Union Guards from 1816 to 1829.

Wagener was elected as a Jacksonian to the Twenty-third and Twenty-fourth Congresses and elected as a Democrat to the Twenty-fifth and Twenty-sixth Congresses. He served as the chairman of the United States House Committee on Militia during the Twenty-fifth Congress.

In 1852, he established the Easton Bank, and was its president until his death in Easton in 1860. He was interred in the Easton Cemetery.

U.S. House of Representatives
| Preceded by Henry A. P. Muhlenberg | Member of the U.S. House of Representatives from Pennsylvania's 7th congressional district 1833–1841 | Succeeded by John Westbrook |
