= Abraham Robinson McIlvaine =

American politician

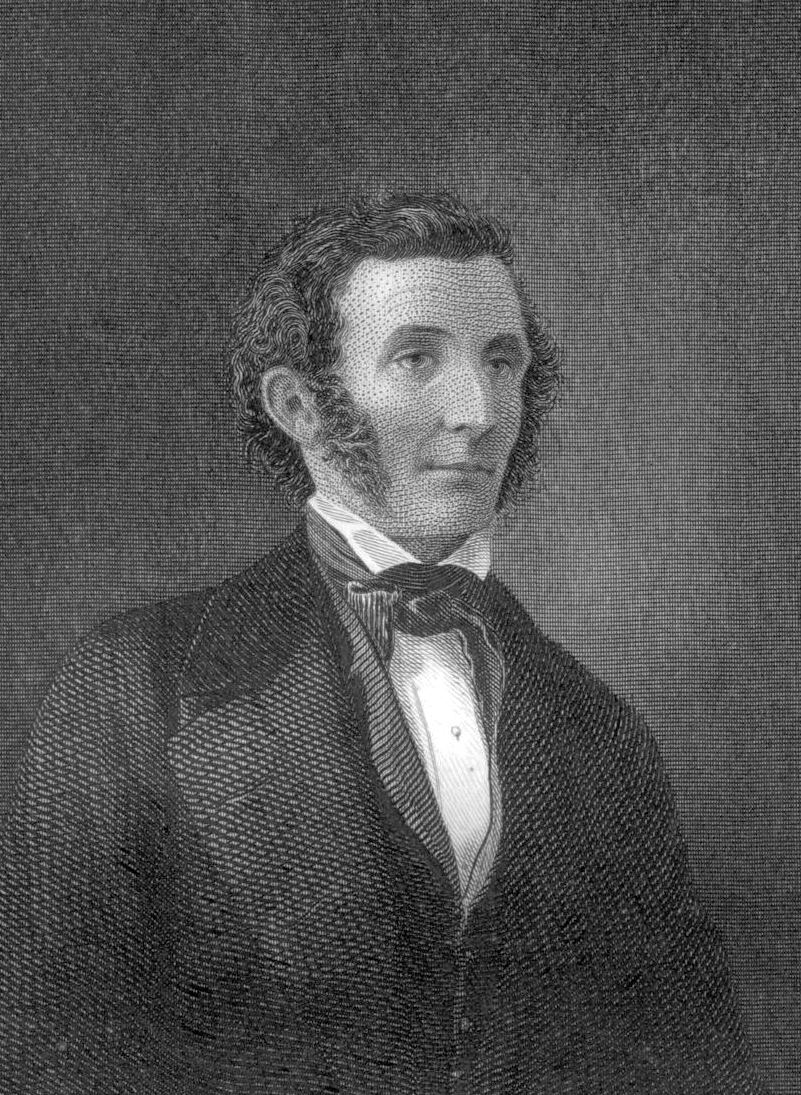
- McIlvaine in the 1840s

Member of the U.S. House of Representatives from Pennsylvania's 7th district
- In office March 4, 1843 – March 3, 1849
- Preceded by: John Westbrook
- Succeeded by: Jesse Column Dickey

Member of the Pennsylvania House of Representatives
- In office 1836–1837

Personal details
- Born: August 14, 1804 Ridley, Pennsylvania
- Died: August 22, 1863 (aged 59) Springton Manor Farm
- Party: Whig

Abraham Robinson McIlvaine (August 14, 1804 – August 22, 1863) was a Whig member of the U.S. House of Representatives from Pennsylvania.

== Biography ==
Abraham R. McIlvaine was born in Ridley, Pennsylvania. He engaged in agricultural pursuits in Chester County, Pennsylvania.

He was a member of the Pennsylvania House of Representatives in 1836 and 1837.

McIlvaine was elected as a Whig to the Twenty-eighth, Twenty-ninth, and Thirtieth Congresses. He served as chairman of the United States House Committee on Expenditures in the Department of War during the Twenty-eighth Congress.

An unsuccessful candidate for renomination in 1848, he resumed his agricultural interests and also engaged in the iron business.

He died on his estate, "Springton Manor Farm" in Chester County in 1863. Interment in Caln Orthodox Quaker Meeting Burial Ground near Downingtown, Pennsylvania. Reinterment in Northwood Cemetery in Downingtown.

U.S. House of Representatives
Preceded by John Westbrook	Member of the U.S. House of Representatives from Pennsylvania's 7th congressional district 1843–1849	Succeeded by Jesse C. Dickey
