= Joseph and Esther Phillips Plantation =

Historic house in Pennsylvania, United States

- U.S. National Register of Historic Places
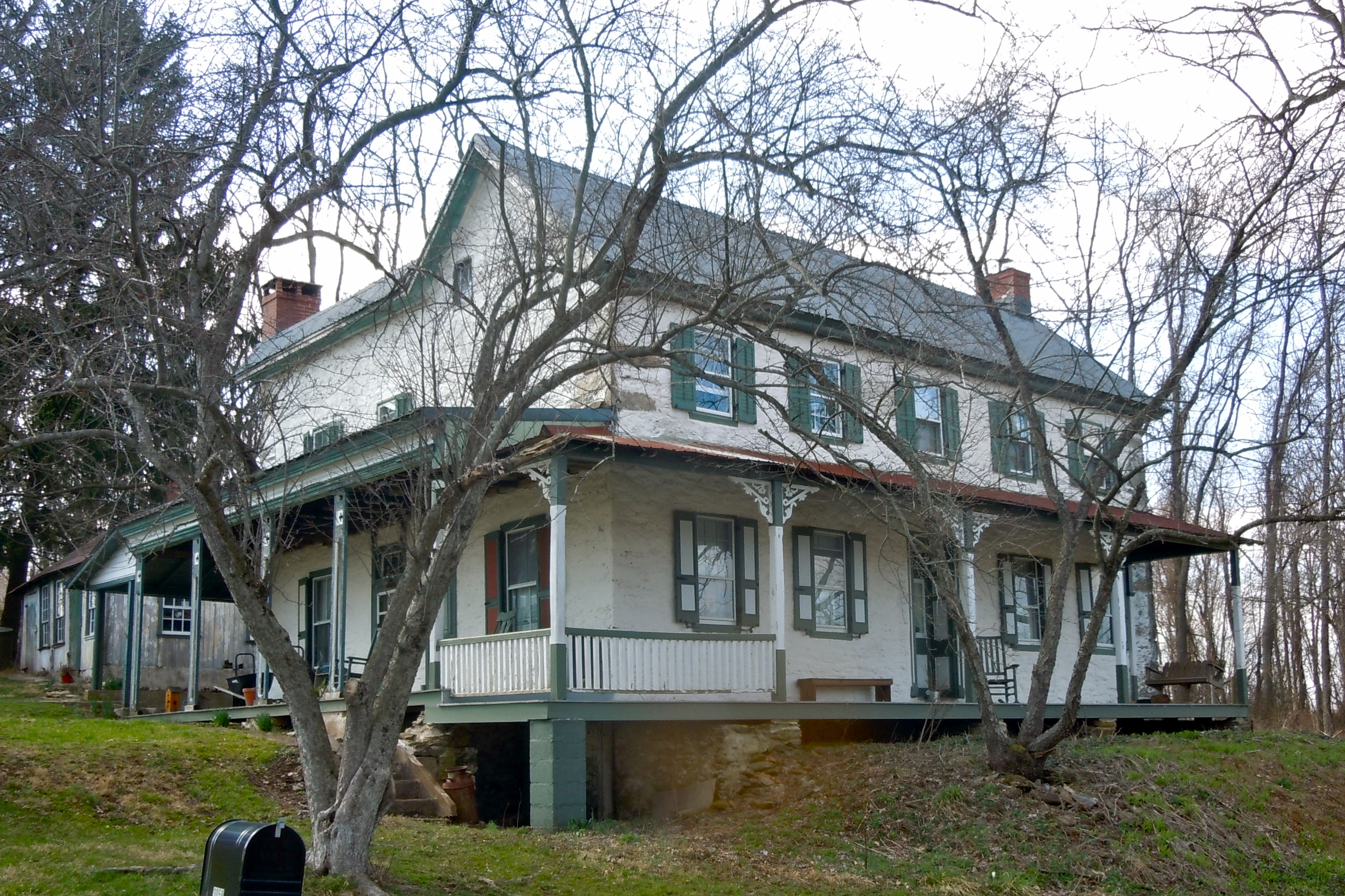
- Phillips Plantation, Home, March 2011

- Location within Pennsylvania Location within the United States
- Location: Bailey's Crossroads, south of Glen Run Road and south of Atglen, West Fallowfield Township, Pennsylvania
- Coordinates: 39°55′36″N 75°58′25″W
- Area: 8 acres (3.2 ha)
- Built: 1813
- Architectural style: Gothic Revival, Georgian
- NRHP reference No.: 90001414
- Added to NRHP: September 5, 1990

The Joseph and Esther Phillips Plantation, also known as The Old Ritter Farm, is an historic home and farm located in West Fallowfield Township, Chester County, Pennsylvania, United States.

It was added to the National Register of Historic Places in 1985.

== History and architectural features ==
This plantation was established in 1813 when the house was built. The house is a 2½-story, five-bay, stuccoed limestone structure. It was built in the Georgian "I"-plan, and has a Gothic Revival-style porch that was added during the 1850s. Other contributing buildings are two stone and frame bank barns, a stone octagonal smokehouse, a frame carriage house and workshop, and a two-story, stone spring house.
