= West Fallowfield Township, Chester County, Pennsylvania =

Township in Pennsylvania, US

West Fallowfield Township
- Township
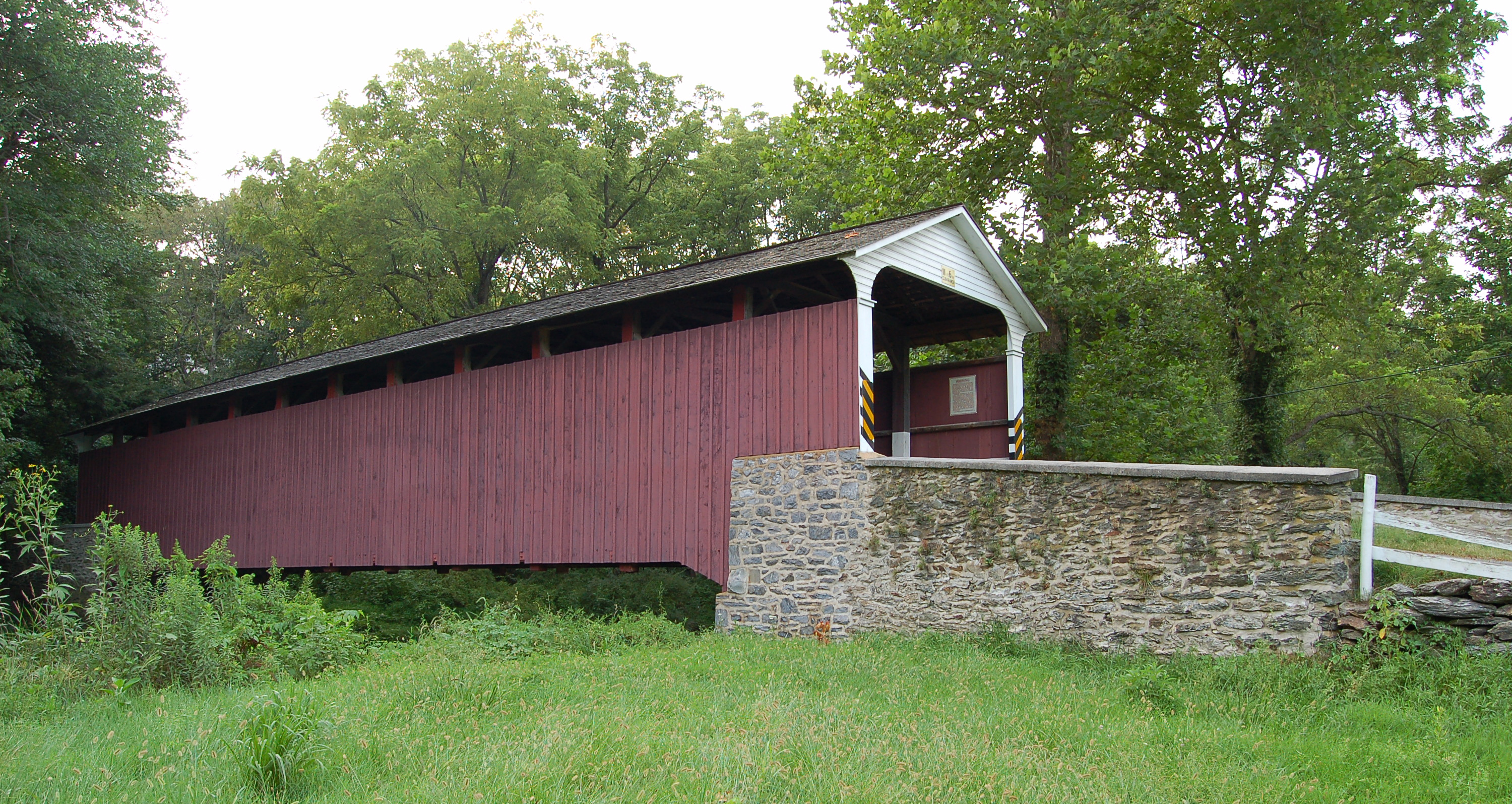
- Mercer's Mill Covered Bridge

- Location of West Fallowfield Township in Chester County (left) and of Chester County in Pennsylvania (right)
- Coordinates: 39°53′46″N 75°58′12″W
- Country: United States
- State: Pennsylvania
- County: Chester

Area
  - Total: 18.25 sq mi (47.27 km^{2})
  - Land: 18.15 sq mi (47.01 km^{2})
  - Water: 0.10 sq mi (0.27 km^{2})
- Elevation: 463 ft (141 m)

Population (2010)
  - Total: 2,566
  - Estimate (2016): 2,588
  - Density: 142.6/sq mi (55.06/km^{2})
- Time zone: UTC-5 (EST)
  - Summer (DST): UTC-4 (EDT)
- Area codes: 610
- FIPS code: 42-029-82936
- Website: https://westfallowfieldtownship.org/

West Fallowfield Township is a township that is located in Chester County, Pennsylvania, United States. The population was 2,566 at the time of the 2010 census. The township includes the unincorporated village of Cochranville.

== History ==
Three locations in the township, Bridge in West Fallowfield Township, Mercer's Mill Covered Bridge, and Joseph and Esther Phillips Plantation are listed on the National Register of Historic Places.

== Geography ==
According to the U.S. Census Bureau, the township has a total area of 18.1 square miles (47 km^{2}), all land.

== Demographics ==
Historical population
Census	Pop.	Note	%±
1930	801		—
1940	931		16.2%
1950	1,069		14.8%
1960	1,425		33.3%
1970	1,694		18.9%
1980	2,122		25.3%
1990	2,342		10.4%
2000	2,485		6.1%
2010	2,566		3.3%
2020	2,459		−4.2%

As of the 2010 census, the township was 89.7% non-Hispanic White, 1.5% Black or African American, 0.9% Asian, and 1.6% were two or more races. 6.8% of the population were of Hispanic or Latino ancestry.

== Roadways ==
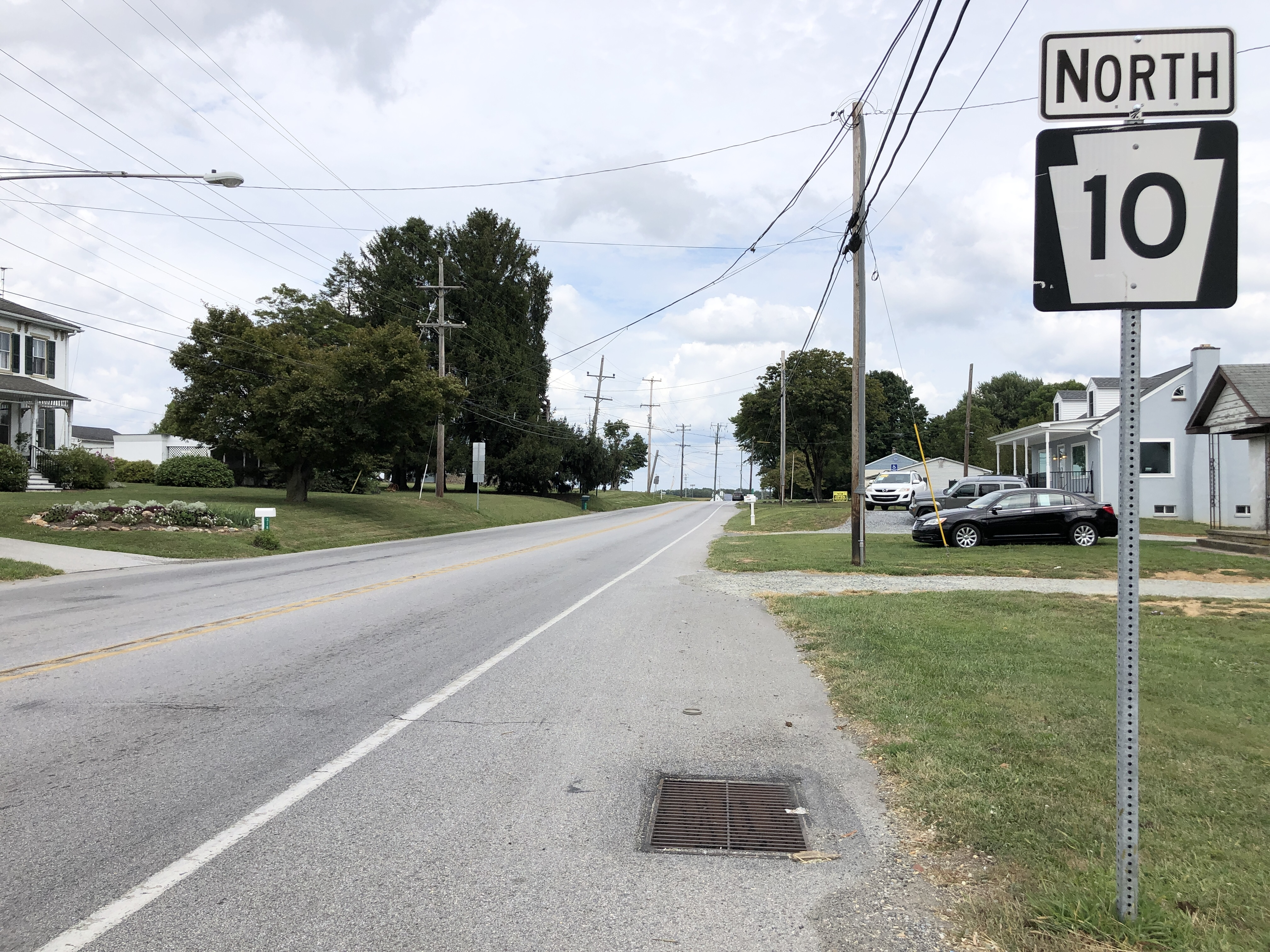
PA 10 northbound in West Fallowfield Township

As of 2020, there were 56.46 miles (90.86 km) of public roads in West Fallowfield Township, of which 8.32 miles (13.39 km) were maintained by the Pennsylvania Department of Transportation (PennDOT) and 48.14 miles (77.47 km) were maintained by the township.

Pennsylvania Route 10 and Pennsylvania Route 41 are the numbered roads serving West Fallowfield Township. PA 10 follows Limestone Road along a north-south alignment across the southeastern corner of the township. PA 41 follows Gap Newport Pike along a northwest-southeast alignment across the northern and eastern parts of the township.

== Notable residents ==
- Robert Futhey (1789–1870), member of the Pennsylvania House of Representatives
- Robert E. Monaghan (1822-1895), Pennsylvania State Representative
