= Cochranville, Pennsylvania =

Unincorporated community in Pennsylvania, US

- Census-designated place
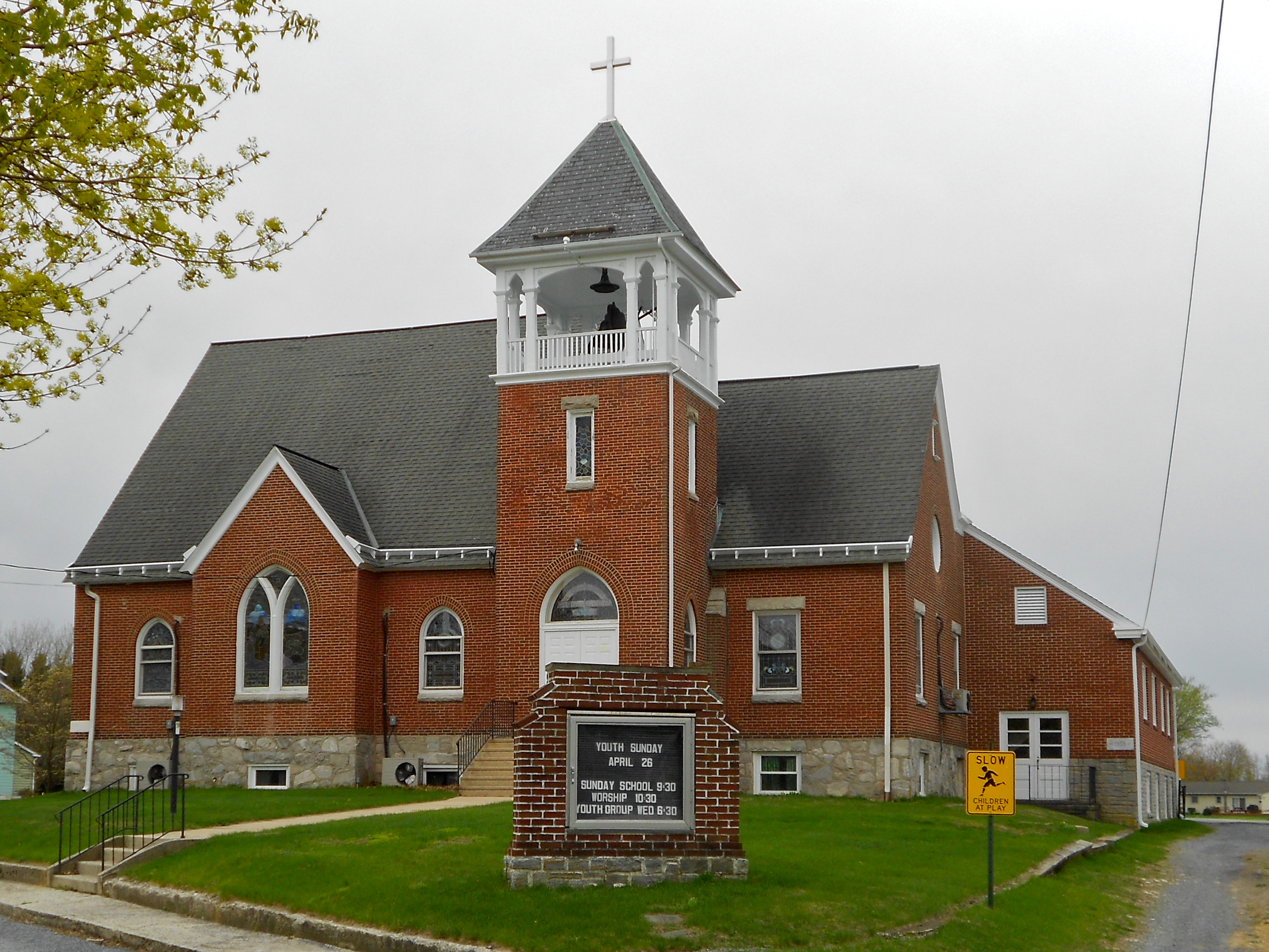
- Methodist Episcopal Church

- Location in Chester County and the state of Pennsylvania.
- Coordinates: 39°53′30″N 75°55′17″W
- Country: United States
- State: Pennsylvania
- County: Chester
- Township: West Fallowfield

Area
  - Total: 1.12 sq mi (2.90 km^{2})
  - Land: 1.12 sq mi (2.89 km^{2})
  - Water: 0 sq mi (0.00 km^{2})
- Elevation: 582 ft (177 m)

Population (2020)
  - Total: 631
  - Density: 564.7/sq mi (218.02/km^{2})
- Time zone: UTC-5 (Eastern (EST))
  - Summer (DST): UTC-4 (EDT)
- ZIP code: 19330
- Area codes: 610 and 484
- FIPS code: 42-14808
- GNIS feature ID: 1172116

Cochranville is a census-designated place (CDP) in West Fallowfield Township, Chester County, Pennsylvania, United States. The population was 488 as of the 2022 on the Data Commons website. It is the hometown of Olympic swimmer Cierra Runge.

== Geography ==
Cochranville is located at 39°53′30″N 75°55′17″W adjacent to the eastern border of West Fallowfield Township. Pennsylvania Routes 10 and 41 intersect in Cochranville, Route 10 heading north to Parkesburg and southwest to Oxford, while Route 41 heads northwest to Atglen and Gap and southeast to Avondale.

According to the United States Census Bureau, the CDP has a total area of 1.1 square miles (2.9 km^{2}), all land.

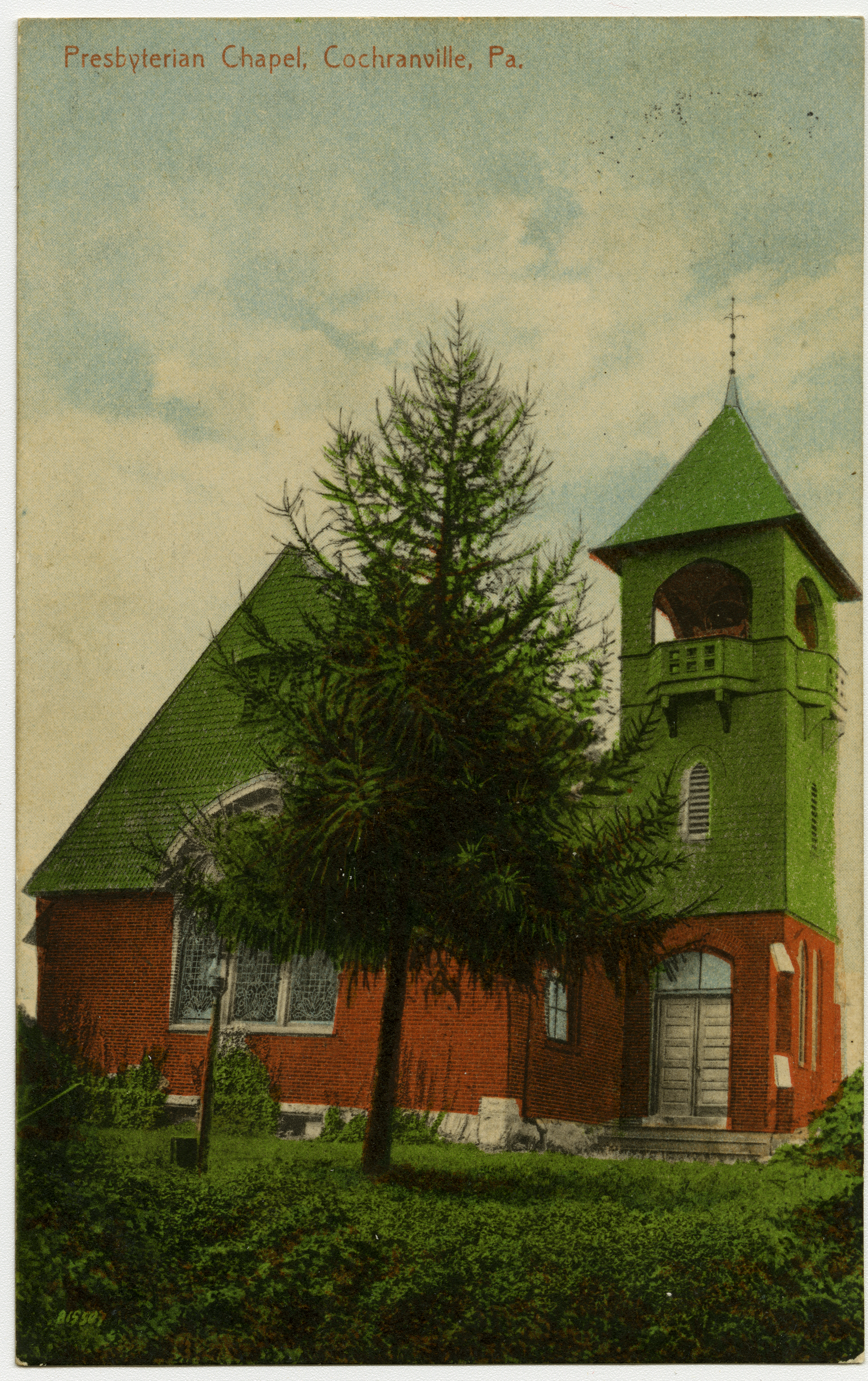
Former Presbyterian church building

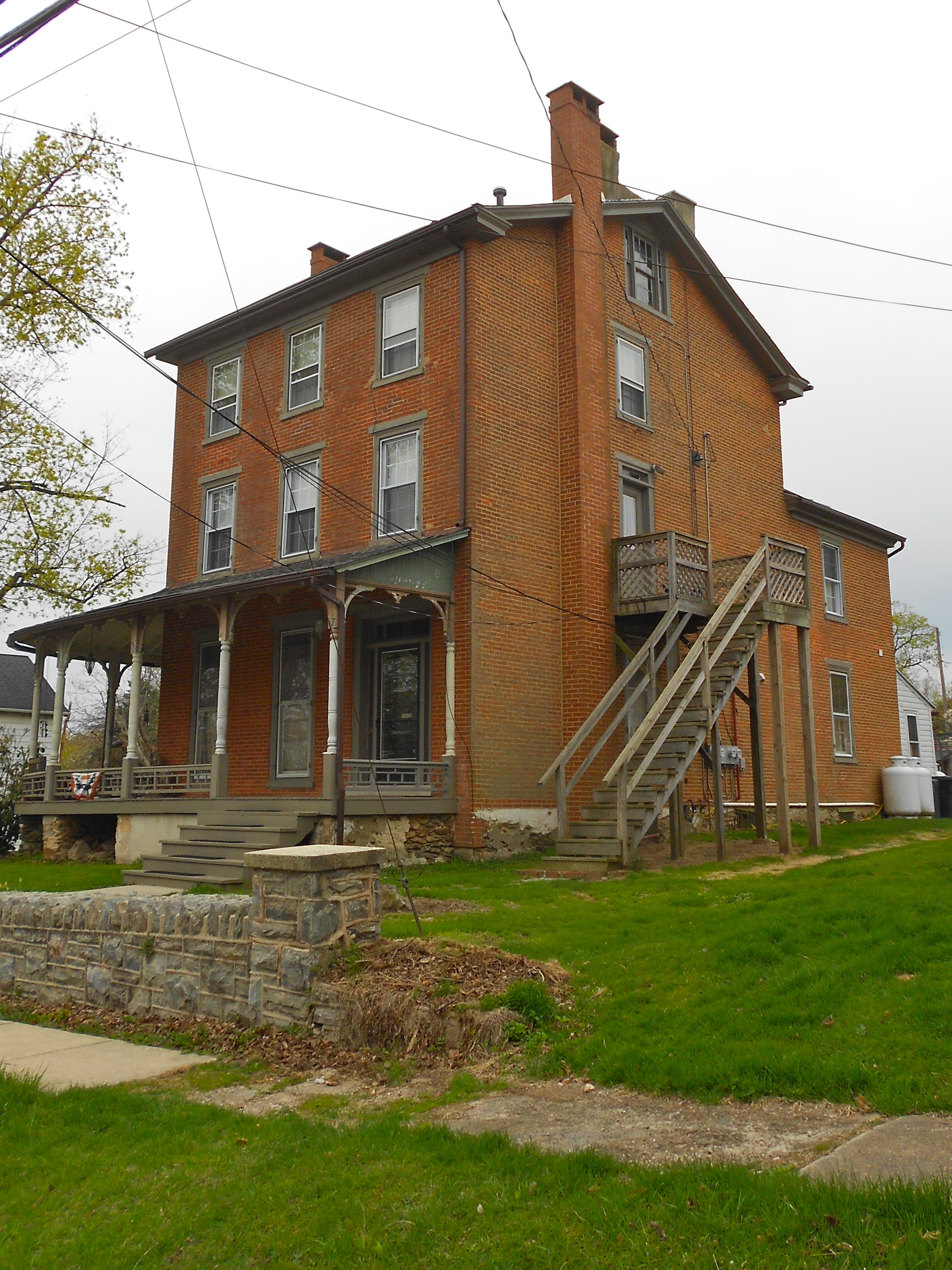

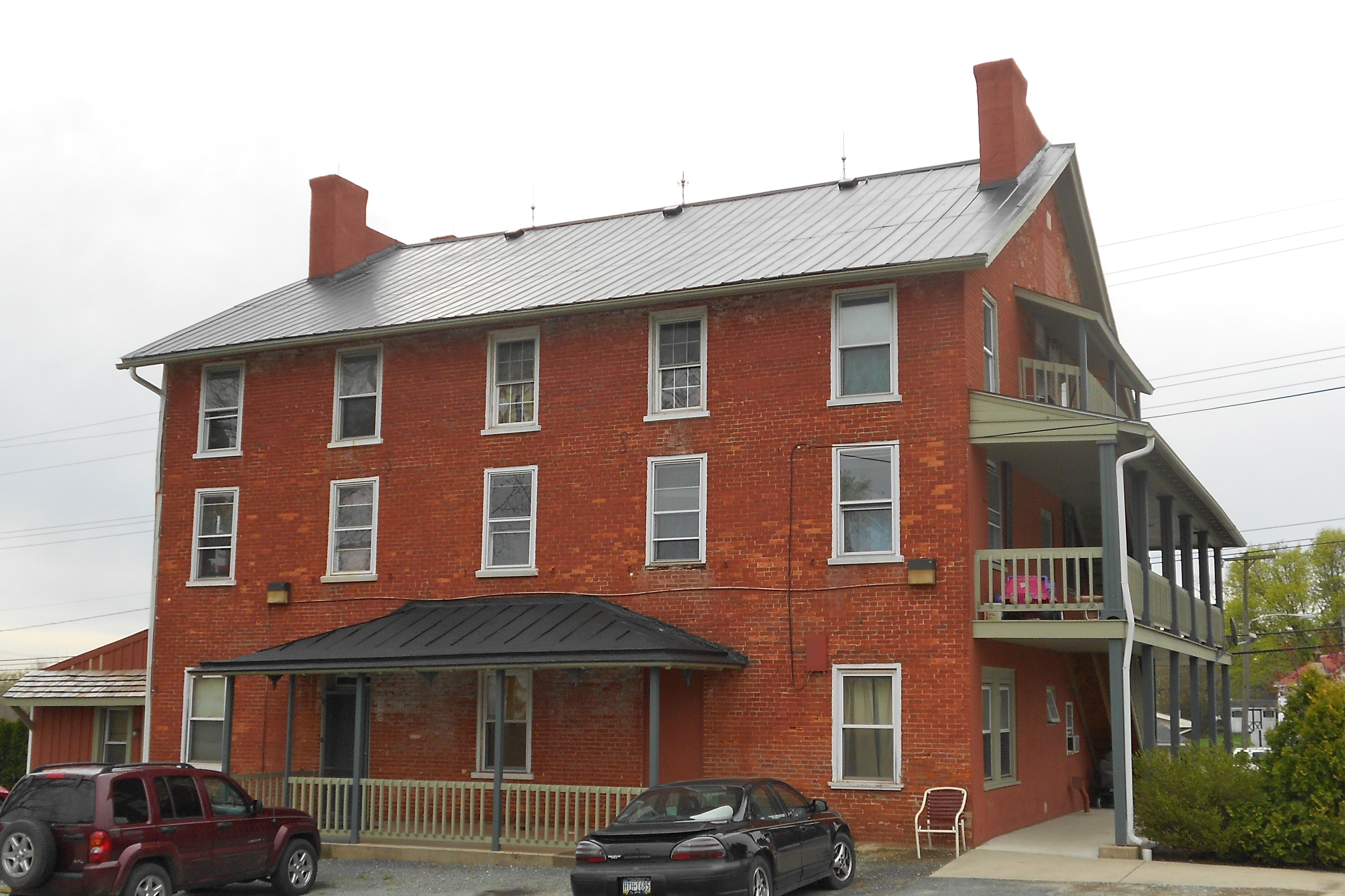

== Demographics ==
Historical population
Census	Pop.	Note	%±
2020	631		—
U.S. Decennial Census

== Education ==
The local public school district is the Octorara Area School District.
