= Jesse C. Dickey =

American politician (1808–1890)

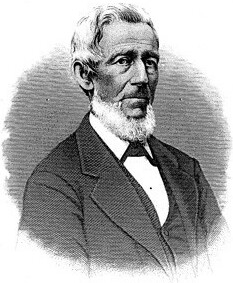
- Dickey, c. 1880

Member of the U.S. House of Representatives from Pennsylvania's 7th district
- In office March 4, 1849 – March 3, 1851
- Preceded by: Abraham Robinson McIlvaine
- Succeeded by: John Alexander Morrison

Member of the Pennsylvania House of Representatives from the Chester County district
- In office 1842–1845 Serving with Emmor Elton, Robert Parke, John Beidler, Joseph Whitaker, William Price
- Preceded by: William K. Correy, Robert Futhey, Emmor Elton, Robert Laverty
- Succeeded by: William Price, William D. Thomas, George Ladley

Personal details
- Born: Jesse Column Dickey; February 27, 1808 New Castle, Pennsylvania, U.S.
- Died: February 19, 1890 (aged 81) New London, Pennsylvania, U.S.
- Resting place: New London Presbyterian Church Cemetery
- Party: Whig
- Spouse: Margaret J. Dickey (m. 1834)
- Children: 9

Jesse Column Dickey (February 27, 1808 – February 19, 1890) was a Whig member of the U.S. House of Representatives from Pennsylvania. He also served in the Pennsylvania House of Representatives.

== Early life ==
Jesse Column Dickey was born on February 27, 1808, in New Castle, Pennsylvania. He moved with his parents to New London, Chester County, Pennsylvania, in 1812. He graduated from New London Academy.

== Career ==
Dickey began teaching school at Hopewell Academy in 1828. He also engaged in agricultural pursuits.

Dickey was elected as a Whig to the Pennsylvania House of Representatives, representing Chester County. He served from 1843 to 1845. He elected as a Whig to the Thirty-first Congress. He was an unsuccessful candidate for reelection to the Thirty-second Congress. During the American Civil War, he served under Cassius M. Clay during the Defense of Washington. He then was quartermaster and later paymaster in the United States Army. He served until June 1866. He traveled extensively in his role as paymaster and worked in St. Louis and New Orleans.

== Personal life ==
On December 11, 1834, he married Margaret J. Dickey, the daughter of Col. David Dickey of Hopewell Cotton Mill, near Oxford. They had nine children. His daughter Letitia married Aaron B. Storey.

Dickey died in New London in 1891, and was interred in New London Presbyterian Church Cemetery.

U.S. House of Representatives
Preceded by Abraham Robinson McIlvaine	Member of the U.S. House of Representatives from Pennsylvania's 7th congressional district 1849–1851	Succeeded by John Alexander Morrison
