= Octorara Junior-Senior High School =

Coordinates: 39.9275°N 75.9462°W

- Octorara Braves Logo

Location
- 226 Highland Road; Atglen, Chester County, PA 19310; United States

Information
- School type: Secondary
- School district: Octorara Area School District
- Superintendent: Dr. Steven Lever
- Principal: Dr. Jonathan Propper
- Staff: 67.87 (FTE)
- Grades: 7-12
- Enrollment: 1,027 (2023–2024)
- Student to teacher ratio: 15.13
- Colors: Red, White & Blue
- Mascot: Braves
- Website: Octorara High School

Octorara Junior-Senior High School is the only secondary school in the Octorara Area School District. It is located between Atglen and Cochranville in Chester County, Pennsylvania, United States.
