= London Grove Township, Pennsylvania =

Township in Pennsylvania, US

London Grove Township
- Township
- Location of London Grove Township in Chester County, Pennsylvania and in Pennsylvania

- Location of Pennsylvania in the United States
- Coordinates: 39°49′06″N 75°48′18″W
- Country: United States
- State: Pennsylvania
- County: Chester
- Founded: 1723

Area
  - Total: 17.25 sq mi (44.68 km^{2})
  - Land: 17.14 sq mi (44.40 km^{2})
  - Water: 0.11 sq mi (0.28 km^{2})
- Elevation: 358 ft (109 m)

Population (2020)
  - Total: 8,797
  - Density: 513.2/sq mi (198.1/km^{2})
- Time zone: UTC-5 (EST)
  - Summer (DST): UTC-4 (EDT)
- Area code: 610
- FIPS code: 42-029-44480
- Website: www.londongrove.org

London Grove Township is a township in Chester County, Pennsylvania, United States. The population was 8,797 at the 2020 census.

== Geography ==
According to the U.S. Census Bureau, the township has a total area of 17.2 square miles (45 km^{2}), of which 0.06% is water.

London Grove Township is located in southern Chester County in Pennsylvania's rolling Piedmont region. The township traditionally has been an agricultural community, but has recently also become an attractive place to live as development pushes west from Philadelphia and north from Wilmington, Delaware.

== Demographics ==
Historical population
Census	Pop.	Note	%±
1930	1,484		—
1940	1,666		12.3%
1950	1,844		10.7%
1960	2,734		48.3%
1970	3,109		13.7%
1980	3,531		13.6%
1990	3,922		11.1%
2000	5,265		34.2%
2010	7,475		42.0%
2020	8,797		17.7%
2020

At the 2020 census, the township was 80.3% non-Hispanic White, 3.0% Black or African American, 0.0% Native American, 6.6% Asian, 0.0% Native Hawaiian or other Pacific Islander, and 8.7% were two or more races. 9.8% of the population were of Hispanic or Latino ancestry. Foreign born persons, percent, 2018–2022 7.5%

At the 2000 census there were 5,265 people, 1,633 households, and 1,365 families living in the township. The population density was 305.9 inhabitants per square mile (118.1/km^{2}). There were 1,698 housing units at an average density of 98.7 per square mile (38.1/km^{2}). The racial makeup of the township was 91.40% White, 2.41% African American, 0.23% Native American, 0.44% Asian, 3.68% from other races, and 1.84% from two or more races. Hispanic or Latino of any race were 13.20%.

There were 1,633 households, 46.5% had children under the age of 18 living with them, 73.2% were married couples living together, 6.1% had a female householder with no husband present, and 16.4% were non-families. 13.0% of households were made up of individuals, and 4.3% were one person aged 65 or older. The average household size was 3.12 and the average family size was 3.39.

The age distribution was 30.4% under the age of 18, 6.9% from 18 to 24, 32.4% from 25 to 44, 21.6% from 45 to 64, and 8.7% 65 or older. The median age was 35 years. For every 100 females, there were 109.3 males. For every 100 females age 18 and over, there were 108.2 males.

The median household income was $74,337 and the median family income was $78,635. Males had a median income of $47,292 versus $30,963 for females. The per capita income for the township was $27,654. About 1.5% of families and 2.6% of the population were below the poverty line, including 1.7% of those under age 18 and 1.5% of those age 65 or over.

== Education ==
London Grove Township is served by the Avon Grove School District.

== Transportation ==
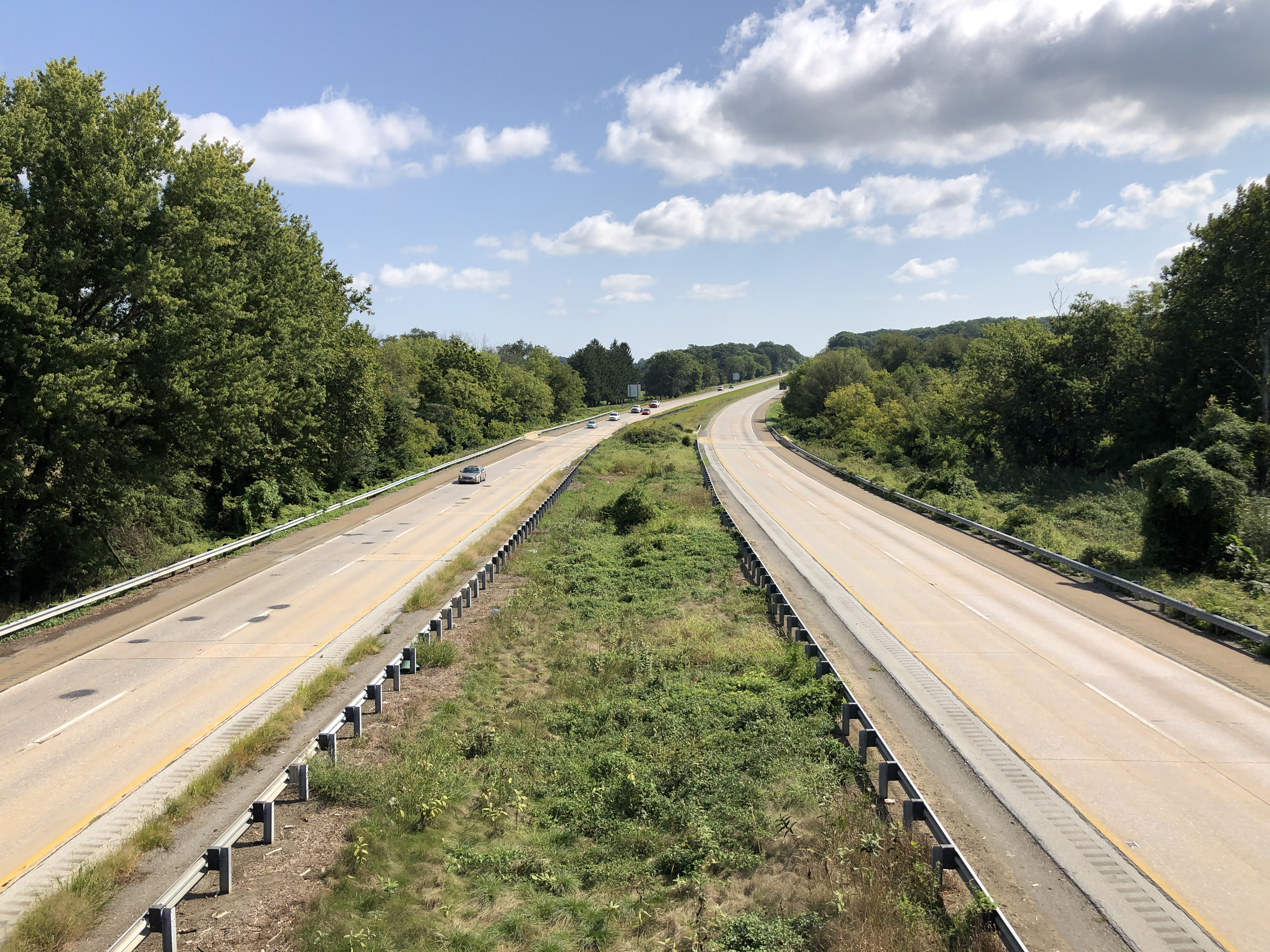
US 1 northbound in London Grove Township

As of 2019, there were 80.61 miles (129.73 km) of public roads in London Grove Township, of which 19.27 miles (31.01 km) were maintained by the Pennsylvania Department of Transportation (PennDOT) and 61.34 miles (98.72 km) were maintained by the township.

U.S. Route 1 is the most prominent highway serving London Grove Township. It follows the Kennett-Oxford Bypass along a southwest–northeast alignment through the central portion of the township. Pennsylvania Route 41 follows Gap Newport Pike along a northwest–southeast alignment across the northern portion of the township. Pennsylvania Route 841 follows Wickerton Road, Chatham Road and Coatesville Road along a north–south alignment across the western and central portions of the township. Finally, Pennsylvania Route 926 follows Street Road along a southwest–northeast alignment along the northern border of the township.

== Notable people ==
- Hannah M. Darlington (1808–1890), activist
- Mark Sullivan, journalist (1874–1952)
