= Avondale, Pennsylvania =

Borough in Pennsylvania, US

- Borough
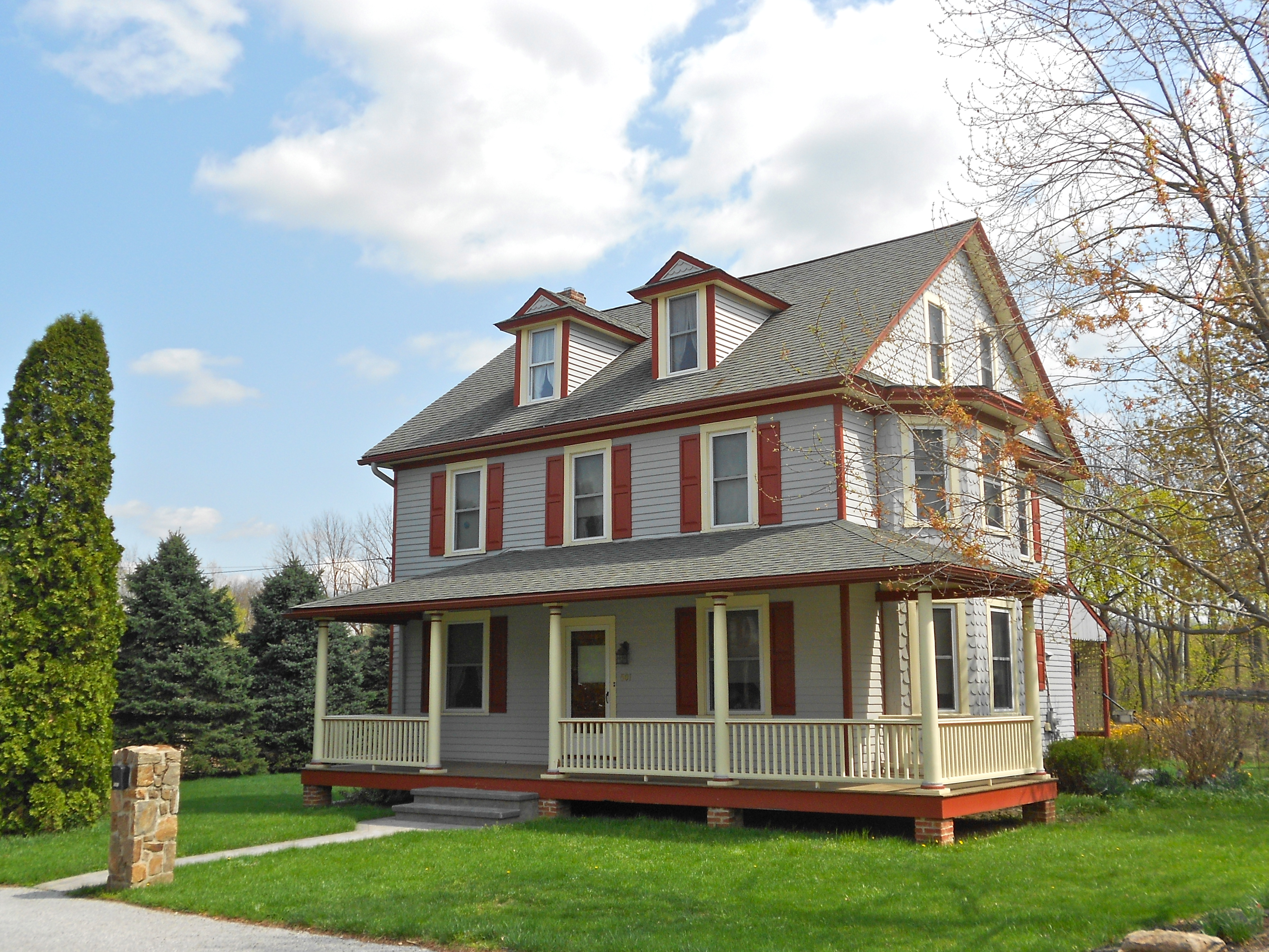

- Seal

- Location in Chester County and the U.S. state of Pennsylvania

- Location in Pennsylvania Location in the United States
- Coordinates: 39°49′24″N 75°47′00″W
- Country: United States
- State: Pennsylvania
- County: Chester

Area
  - Total: 0.49 sq mi (1.28 km^{2})
  - Land: 0.48 sq mi (1.25 km^{2})
  - Water: 0.012 sq mi (0.03 km^{2})
- Elevation: 266 ft (81 m)

Population (2020)
  - Total: 1,274
  - Density: 2,634.8/sq mi (1,017.32/km^{2})
- Time zone: UTC-5 (EST)
  - Summer (DST): UTC-4 (EDT)
- ZIP Code: 19311
- Area codes: 610 and 484
- FIPS code: 42-03656
- Website: avondaleboro.net

Avondale is a borough in Chester County, in southeastern Pennsylvania, United States. The population was 1,272 at the 2020 census.

== Demographics ==
Historical population
Census	Pop.	Note	%±
1880	329		—
1900	640		—
1910	668		4.4%
1920	627		−6.1%
1930	763		21.7%
1940	754		−1.2%
1950	941		24.8%
1960	1,016		8.0%
1970	1,025		0.9%
1980	891		−13.1%
1990	954		7.1%
2000	1,108		16.1%
2010	1,265		14.2%
2020	1,274		0.7%
2021 (est.)	1,267	▼	−0.5%

As of the 2010 census, the borough was 30.7% non-Hispanic White, 8.9% Black or African American, 1.4% Native American, 0.8% Asian, and 2.8% were two or more races. 59.0% of the population were of Hispanic or Latino ancestry.

At the time of the 2000 census, there were 1,108 people, 345 households, and 247 families residing in Avondale. The population density was 2,248.7 inhabitants per square mile (868.2/km^{2}). There were 361 housing units at an average density of 732.7 per square mile (282.9/km^{2}). The racial makeup of Avondale was 69.77% White, 16.61% African American, 0.90% Native American, 0.27% Asian, 10.38% from other races, and 2.08% from two or more races. Hispanic or Latino of any race accounted for 38.09% of the population.

Out of the 345 households, 36.5% had children under the age of 18 living with them, 49.6% were married couples living together, 12.8% had a female householder with no husband present, and 28.4% were non-families. 21.4% of all households were made up of individuals, and 6.7% had someone living alone who was 65 years of age or older. The average household size was 3.08 and the average family size was 3.52.

The population of Avondale was spread out, with 26.2% under the age of 18, 11.9% from 18 to 24, 32.7% from 25 to 44, 19.3% from 45 to 64, and 9.9% who were 65 years of age or older. The median age was 32 years. For every 100 females there were 113.1 males. For every 100 females age 18 and over, there were 122.3 males.

The median income for a household in Avondale was $46,875, and the median income for a family was $48,833. Males had a median income of $33,750 versus $25,536 for females. The per capita income was $16,794. About 9.7% of families and 14.9% of the population were below the poverty line, including 12.1% of those under age 18 and 15.3% of those age 65 or over.

== Culture ==
Avondale is the location of St. Rocco Church, the first National Hispanic Parish established by the Roman Catholic Archdiocese of Philadelphia. The church was established in 2011 to serve the needs of the large Spanish-speaking Catholic Latino community in the area, which is mostly composed of Mexican immigrants, but also includes people from Puerto Rico, Colombia, Argentina, Guatemala, and other Latin American countries. Many parishioners work in the local mushroom farming industry.

== Geography ==
Avondale is on the East Branch White Clay Creek.

The borough has a total area of 0.5 square miles (1.3 km^{2}), all land.

=== Climate ===
Climate data for Avondale, Pennsylvania, 1991–2020 normals, extremes 2006–present
Month	Jan	Feb	Mar	Apr	May	Jun	Jul	Aug	Sep	Oct	Nov	Dec	Year
Record high °F (°C)	69 (21)	77 (25)	79 (26)	87 (31)	97 (36)	96 (36)	100 (38)	94 (34)	93 (34)	92 (33)	77 (25)	71 (22)	100 (38)
Mean daily maximum °F (°C)	38.6 (3.7)	41.2 (5.1)	49.8 (9.9)	61.5 (16.4)	71.2 (21.8)	79.5 (26.4)	83.6 (28.7)	81.5 (27.5)	75.3 (24.1)	63.9 (17.7)	53.3 (11.8)	43.2 (6.2)	61.9 (16.6)
Daily mean °F (°C)	30.6 (−0.8)	32.6 (0.3)	40.4 (4.7)	50.8 (10.4)	60.7 (15.9)	69.2 (20.7)	73.6 (23.1)	71.7 (22.1)	65.2 (18.4)	53.9 (12.2)	43.8 (6.6)	35.4 (1.9)	52.3 (11.3)
Mean daily minimum °F (°C)	22.7 (−5.2)	24.0 (−4.4)	31.0 (−0.6)	40.2 (4.6)	50.2 (10.1)	59.0 (15.0)	63.7 (17.6)	61.9 (16.6)	55.2 (12.9)	43.8 (6.6)	34.3 (1.3)	97.6 (36.4)	42.8 (6.0)
Record low °F (°C)	−5 (−21)	−2 (−19)	−1 (−18)	21 (−6)	31 (−1)	41 (5)	49 (9)	49 (9)	37 (3)	26 (−3)	14 (−10)	3 (−16)	−5 (−21)
Average precipitation inches (mm)	3.62 (92)	3.12 (79)	4.40 (112)	3.79 (96)	3.58 (91)	4.43 (113)	4.17 (106)	4.28 (109)	4.47 (114)	4.03 (102)	3.22 (82)	4.03 (102)	47.14 (1,197)
Average precipitation days (≥ 9.01 in)	10.8	12.0	12.0	11.3	12.3	11.4	10.1	9.7	8.1	10.2	8.4	11.8	128.1
Source 1: NOAA
Source 2: National Weather Service

== Transportation ==
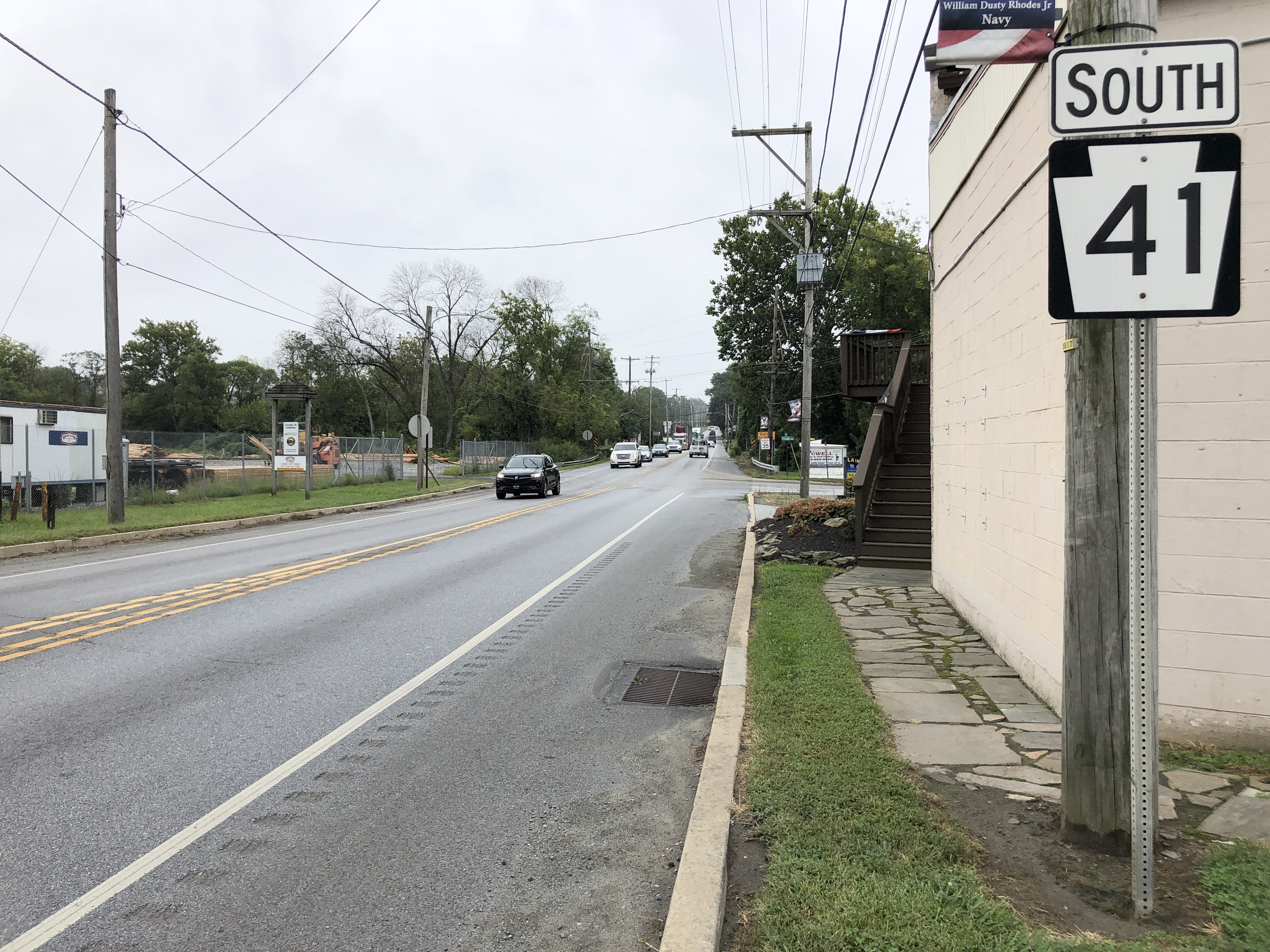
PA 41 southbound in Avondale

As of 2018, there were 6.13 miles (9.87 km) of public roads in Avondale, of which 1.88 miles (3.03 km) were maintained by Pennsylvania Department of Transportation (PennDOT) and 4.25 miles (6.84 km) were maintained by the borough.

Pennsylvania Route 41 is the only numbered highway serving Avondale directly. It follows Pennsylvania Avenue on a northwest-to-southeast alignment through the heart of the borough.

== Notable person ==
Famed journalist Mark Sullivan (1874–1952) was born on a farm just outside Avondale and returned to live on that same farm in his later years.

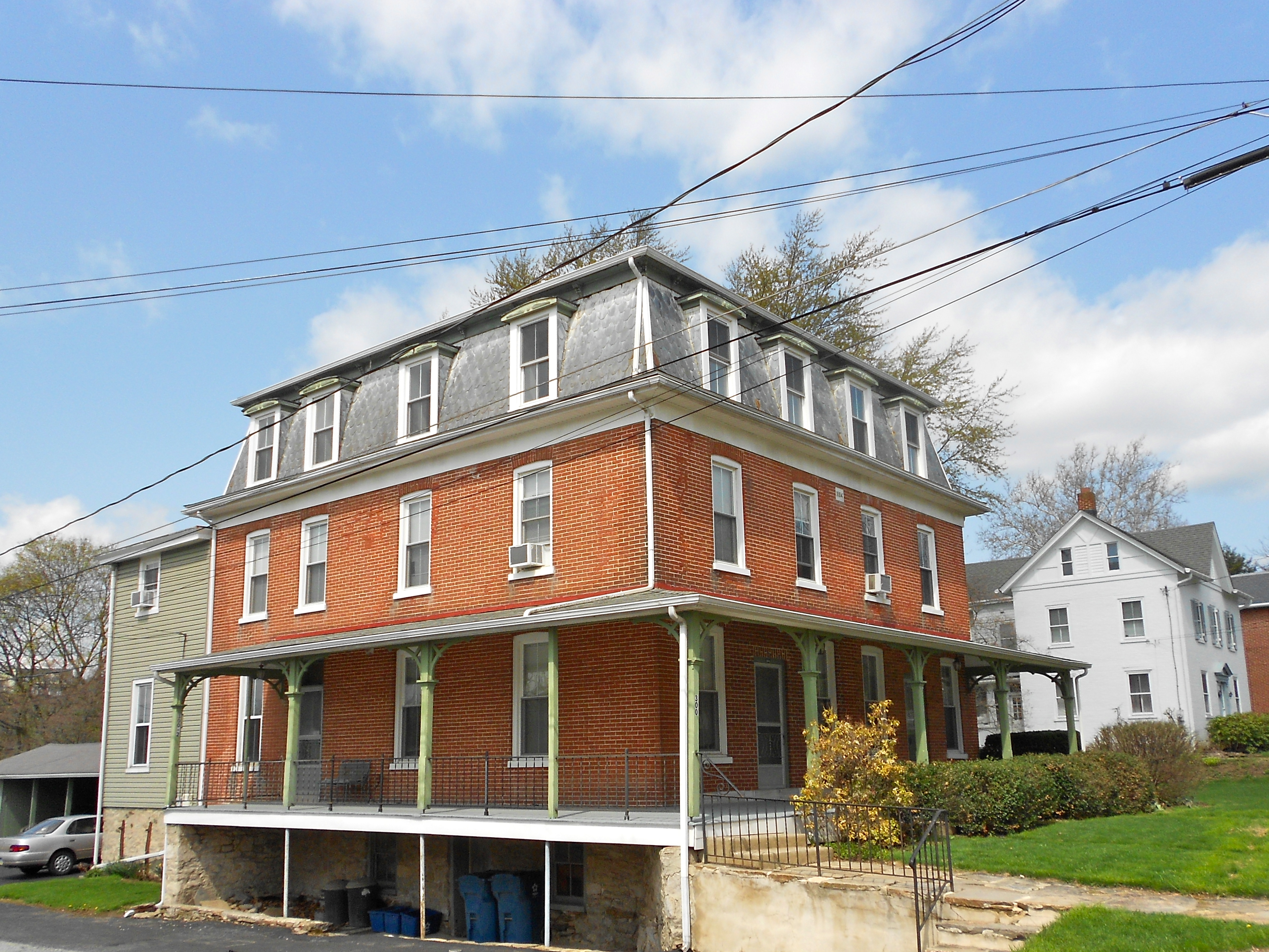

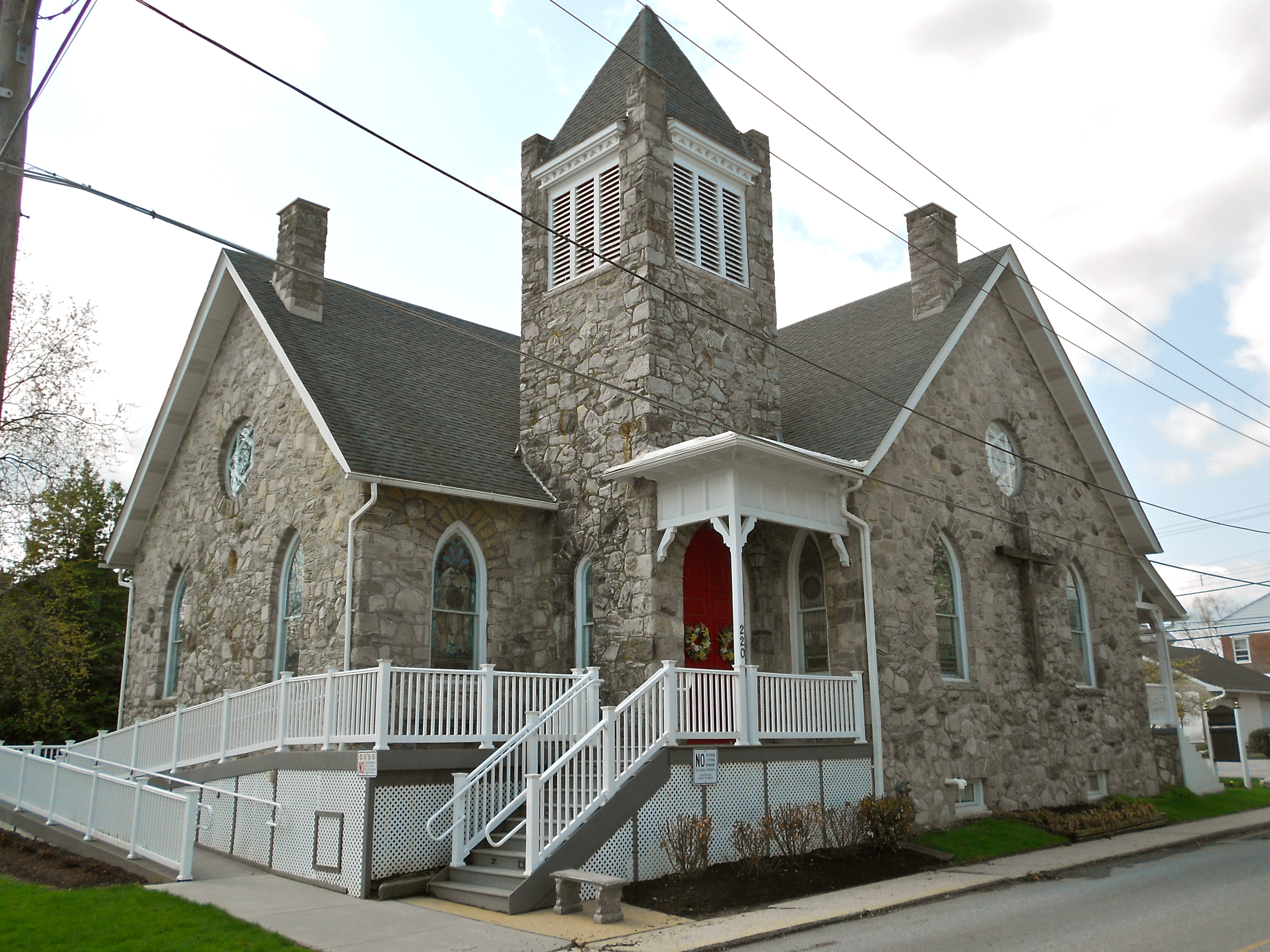
United Methodist church

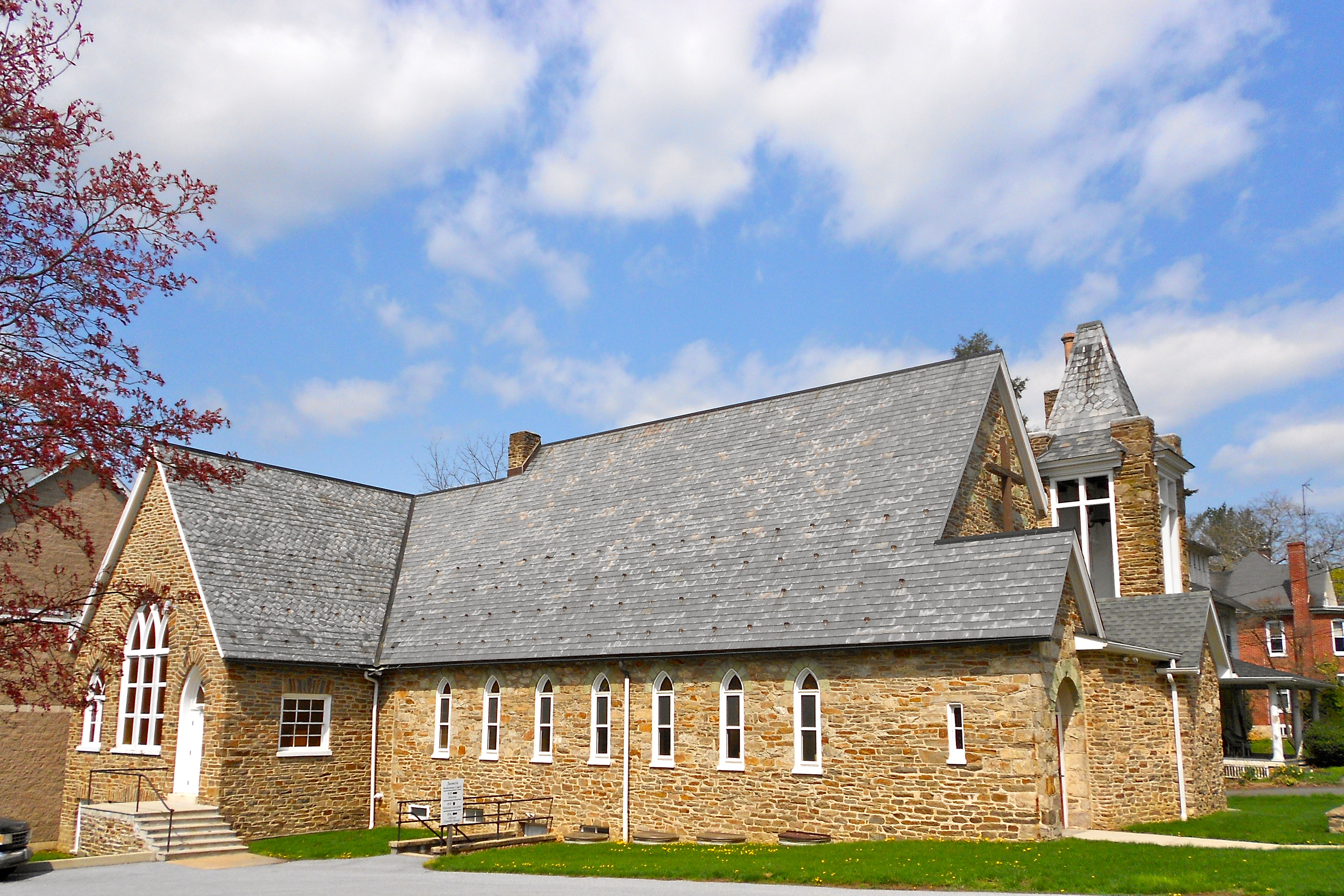
Presbyterian church

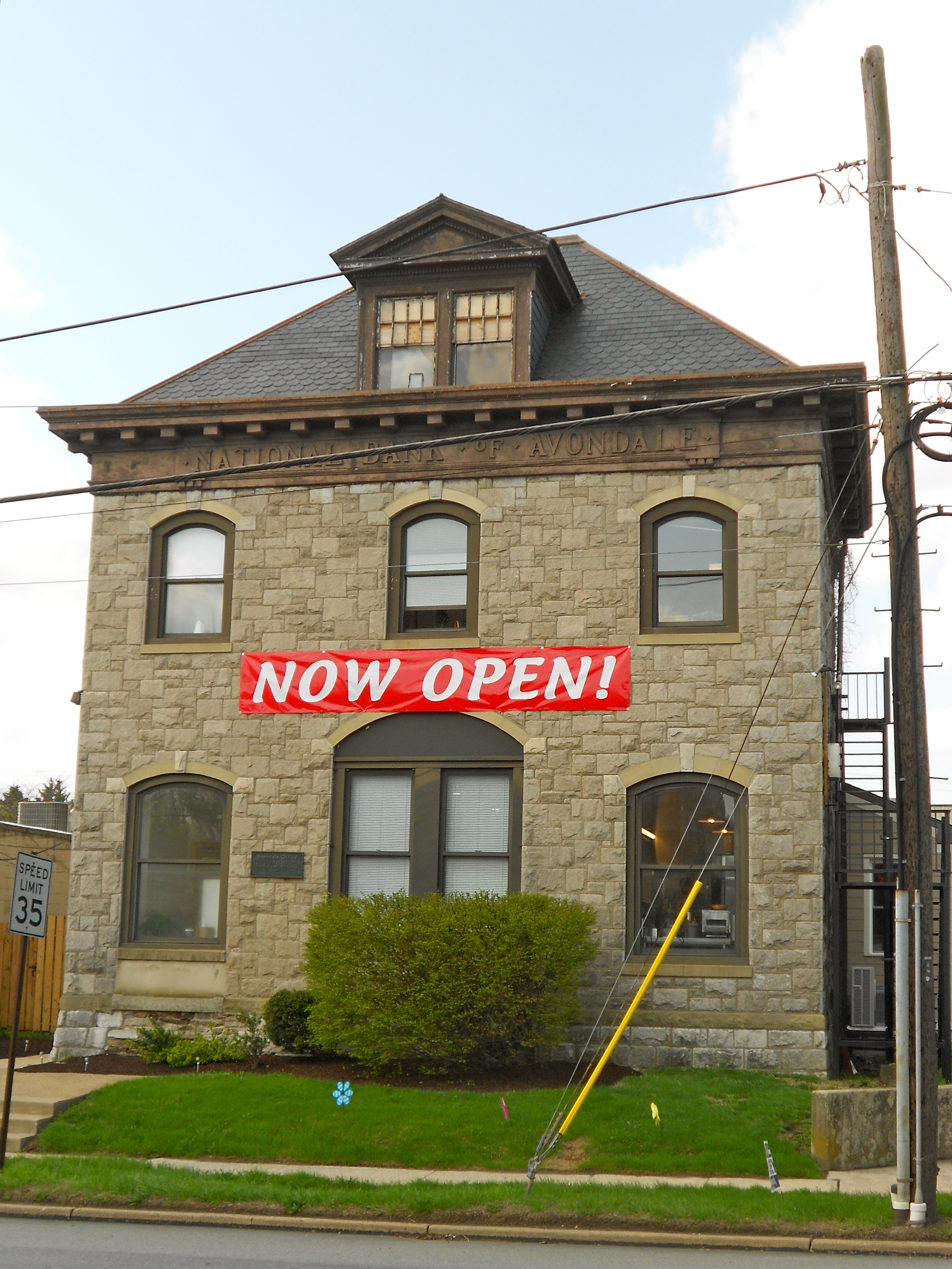

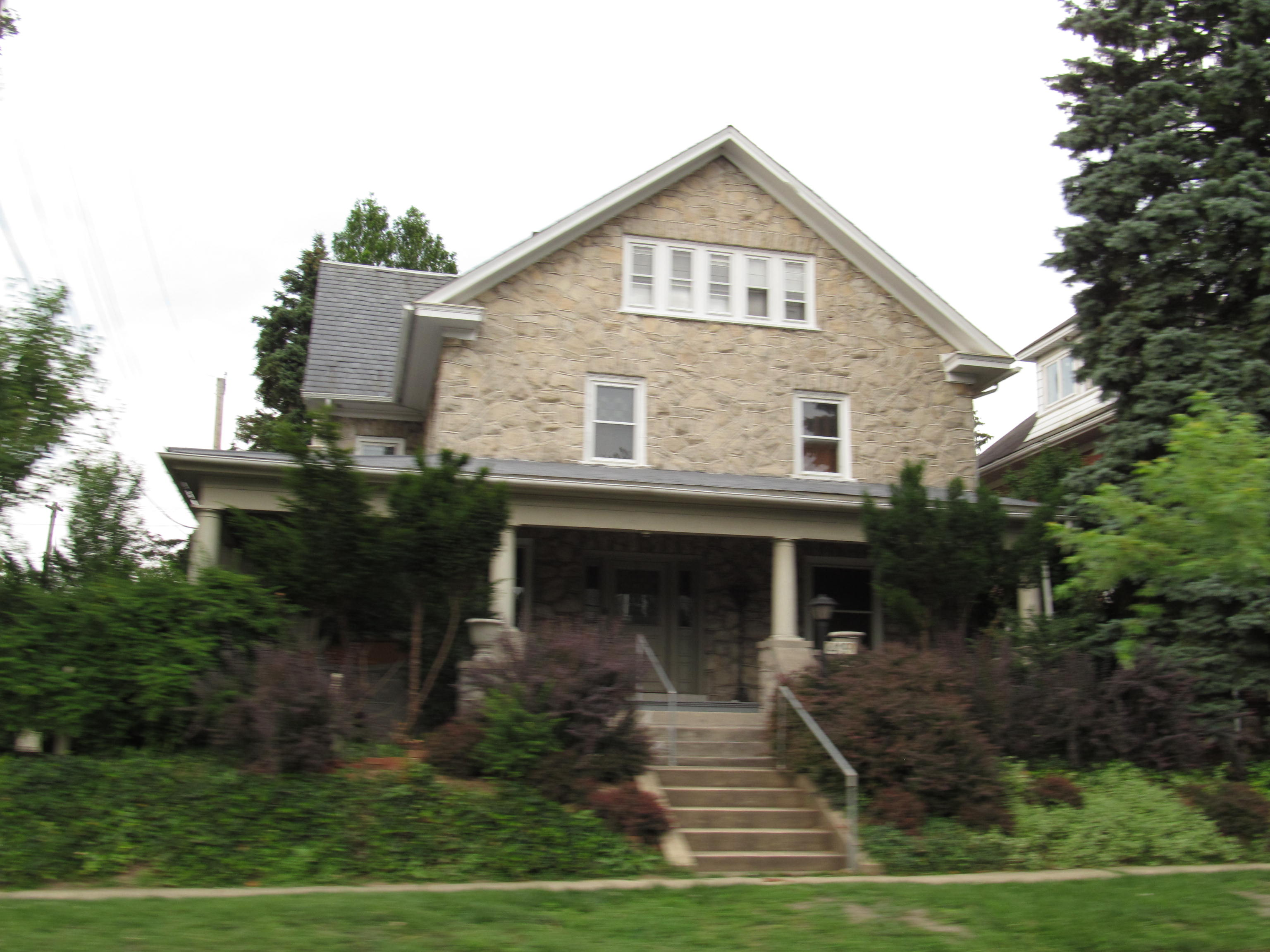
