= Hopewell, Chester County, Pennsylvania =

Unincorporated community in Pennsylvania, US

Hopewell, Pennsylvania
- Unincorporated community & former borough
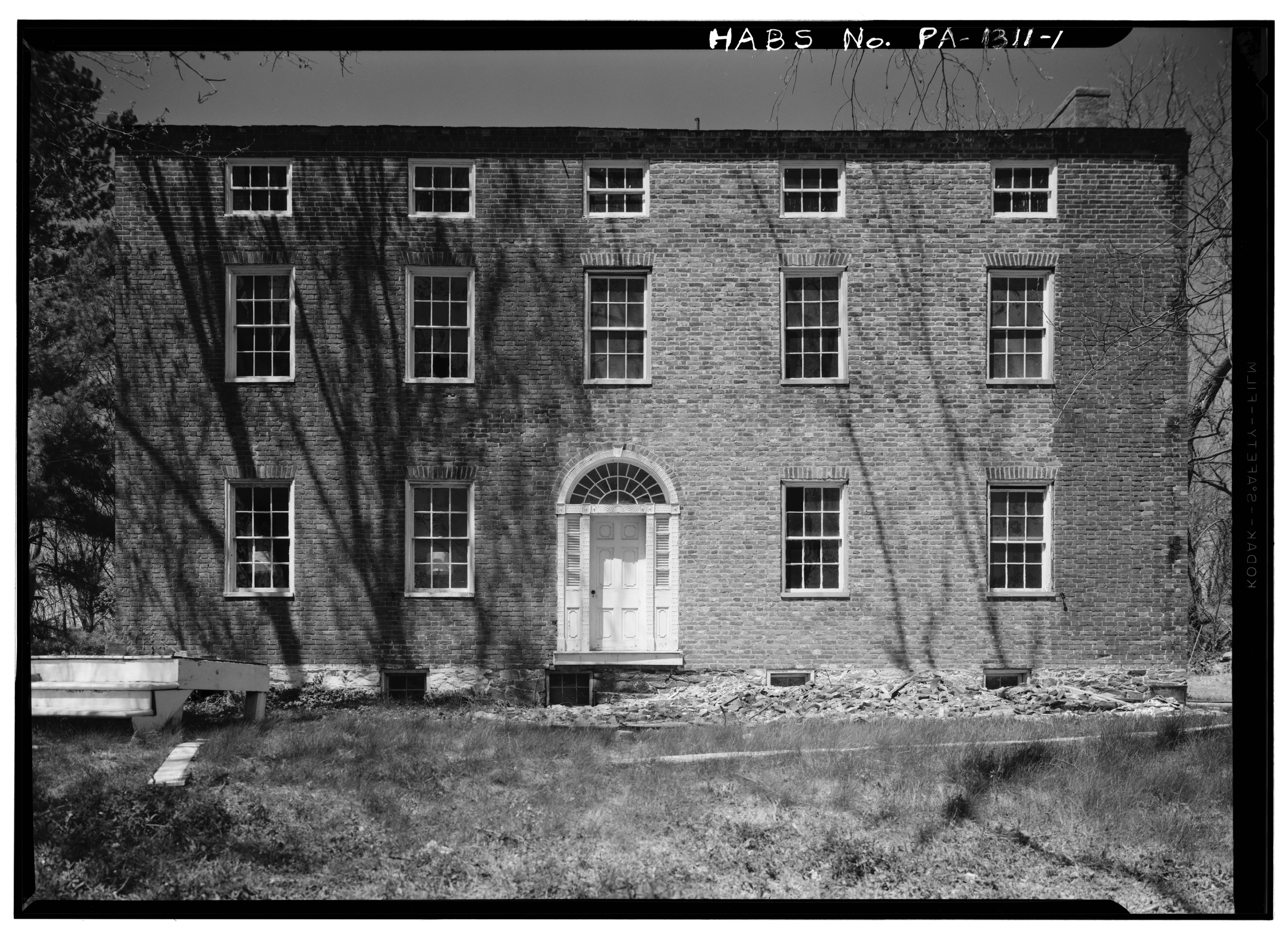
- The Second Hopewell Academy

- Approximate location in Chester County and the U.S. state of Pennsylvania

- Location within the state of Pennsylvania
- Coordinates: 39°46′45″N 76°00′59″W
- Country: United States
- State: Pennsylvania
- County: Chester
- Townships: East Nottingham & Lower Oxford
- Incorporated as Borough: 2 May 1853
- Unincorporated: 1914
- Elevation: 344 ft (105 m)
- Demonym: Hopewellian
- Time zone: UTC-5 (Eastern (EST))
  - Summer (DST): UTC-4 (EDT)
- GNIS feature ID: 1203835

Hopewell is an unincorporated community and former borough which is located in Chester County, Pennsylvania, United States.

This Pennsylvania village was incorporated as a borough on 2 May 1853. After declining in the late 1800s, it was reabsorbed into East Nottingham and Lower Oxford townships in 1914.

It lies at an elevation of 344 feet (105 m) and is also the location of the Hopewell Historic District.

== History ==
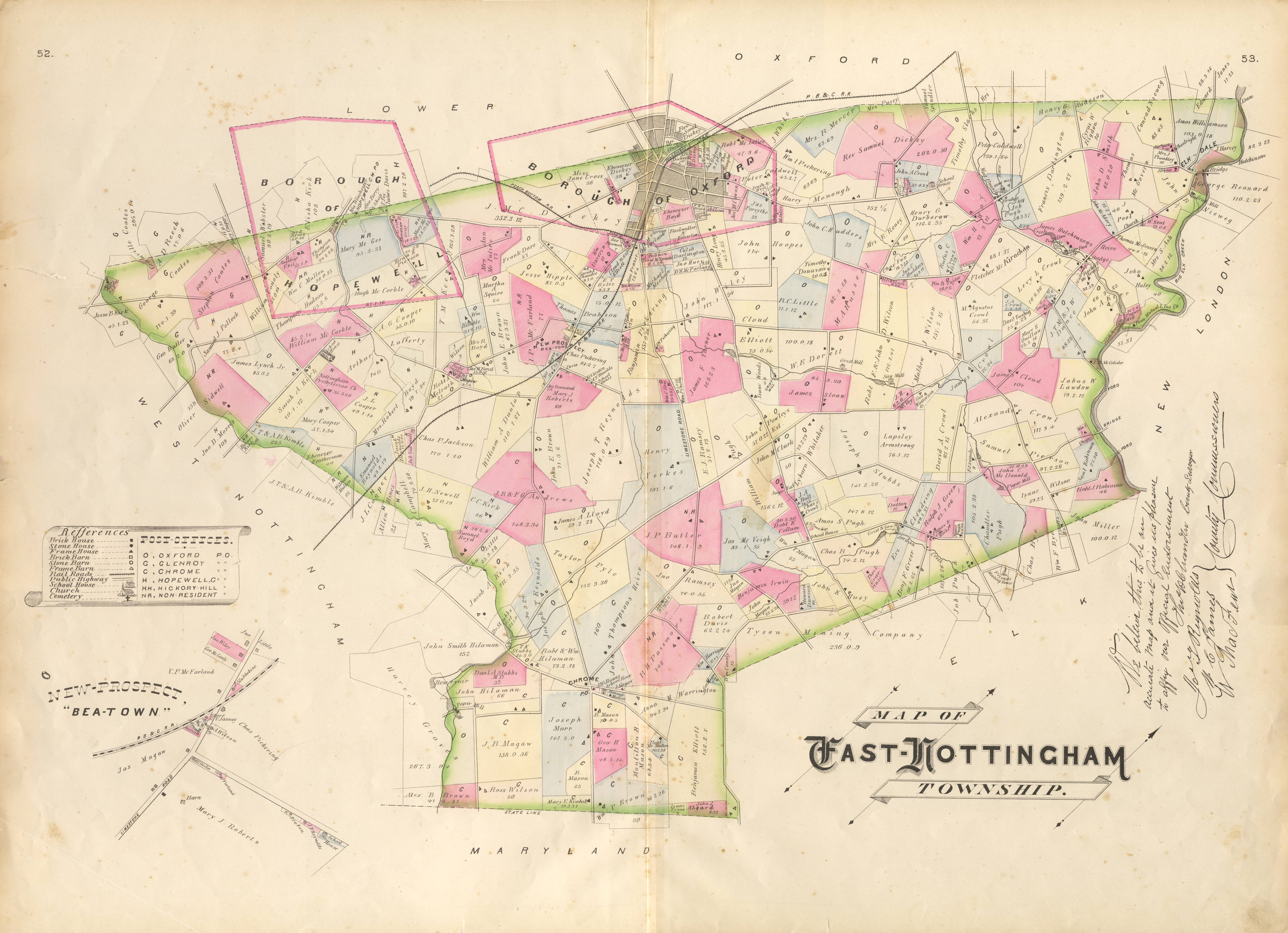
1883 Breou's Farm Map showing Hopewell Borough (top left)

Hopewell's founding is directly linked to the history of the Dickey family, who arrived in East Nottingham Township from Northern Ireland in the 1730s. The first Dickey, Samuel Dickey, Sr., acquired a property in the township and built an estate he called "Palmyra". His son, Samuel, Jr., inherited the estate and expanded it to include a carpenter shop and a brick oven. Samuel Dickey, Jr., raised four sons: John; Samuel, III; Ebenezer (father of John Miller Dickey); and David. After his death Palmyra was split between Samuel, III, and David. Samuel, III, continued the property's development and built a small cotton mill in 1809. By 1812, Samuel, III, had built another cotton mill northeast of Palmyra on Tweed Creek, the future site of Hopewell. David had also built mills in this area for manufacturing flour and wood products. The two brothers later combined their commercial efforts and formed the Hopewell Cotton Works. Around 1816, Ebenezer joined his brothers' enterprise, and the group began doing business as S. E. & D. Dickey.

The Hopewell Cotton Works originally produced cotton yarn, but at its height also produced around one hundred different varieties of fabric. The mill began to recruit skilled labor, such as carpentry and masonry, which drew talent and settlers to the region. As their business thrived, the brothers built new estates around the mills and began building homes for their workers to rent. Hopewell received a general store at this time as well. Hopewell’s public school opened in 1826, and, in 1830, the Hopewell Post Office opened within the general store. When David and Ebenezer died in 1831, Samuel assumed full control of the Hopewell Works.

Village resident Thompson Hudson opened Hopewell Academy in 1834, a private school he operated on his property.

Samuel Dickey, III, died in 1835 and left most of his businesses to his sons Samuel J., Ebenezer J., and David J. At the time of Samuel’s death, the Hopewell Works consisted of two cotton mills, a sawmill, a gristmill, the general store, a wheelwright shop, a blacksmith shop, and a machine shop.

The new generation of Dickeys, known commercially as S. J. Dickey and Brothers, began buying up large swaths of farmland in the region. The brothers were accomplished farmers, and Ebenezer J. even patented a seed drill he had invented to ease the planting of crops. He also patented a “butter worker” that he claimed could produce one hundred pounds of butter in fifteen minutes.

The first Hopewell Academy shuttered in 1841, but a former teacher, Jesse C. Dickey opened his own educational institution shortly thereafter. His school, also called Hopewell Academy, offered lessons in mathematics, Latin, Greek, botany, chemistry, and many other subjects. The academy offered an education equivalent to two years of college and drew students from all over southern Chester County.

Hopewell continued to prosper; and, in 1848, residents of the village petitioned the county government to shift the border of Lower Oxford Township south to include all of Hopewell in one municipality. When their effort failed, they petitioned for Hopewell to receive borough status. This succeeded, and two square miles were erected from Lower Oxford and East Nottingham Townships on 2 May 1853 to form the Borough of Hopewell.

By 1860, the Hopewell Mill had become the fourth most profitable mill in Chester County; however, 1860 was also the year that marked the beginning of Hopewell’s decline. In the 1850s, Oxford and Hopewell had been similar in size, but this changed when the Philadelphia and Baltimore Central Railroad was laid in the region. The railroad bypassed Hopewell and instead went through the center of Oxford. The population of Oxford ballooned, and Hopewell’s began to decline. Many people left the town for Oxford, where they saw more personal opportunities. The second Hopewell Academy closed its doors in 1861, leaving the town with only its small public schoolhouse. The beginning of the Civil War also damaged the borough’s prospects. S. J. Dickey and Brothers suddenly went bankrupt in early 1862 due wartime cotton shortages and years of mismanagement. Its assets were sold off, and despite some of the works reopening, agriculture became the main driver of the Hopewell economy.

In the late 1860s and early 1870s, there was some short-lived hope of a revival. The Hopewell Cotton Works briefly rebounded around 1869, and the borough finally received a railroad connection in 1872 with the completion of the Peach Bottom Railway. Another positive development occurred in 1875 when the Hopewell Lyceum was founded. The social club drew large crowds but did not disrupt the general trend of decline that the borough was facing.

By 1870, almost all of the Dickey family had left Hopewell, with many resettling in Oxford. The Chester County Milk Company, located in Hopewell, shuttered by 1879, and the grist mill burned down at this time as well. The Hopewellian identity began to die, as residents increasingly considered themselves members of the greater Oxford and Nottingham communities as opposed to a distinct Hopewell one. By 1897, thirty-five of the forty-five people in Hopewell who were eligible to vote held some borough office. Even women held some positions in the local government, which was unheard of at the time. The dying borough had become little more than a small cluster of buildings.

Some residents of Hopewell, led by the president of Hopewell’s Board of Health, Elwood Webster, began petitioning the Chester County government to revoke the borough's charter in the mid-1890s. They were unhappy with the high borough taxes and the poor state of the village's roads. The borough officers’ salaries were expensive, and the cost of hosting local elections once a year was high as well. Those in favor of maintaining the borough were led by Squire Thompson Hudson. The first effort at annulment ultimately failed.

The second attempt, begun in 1913, was led by Burgess David F. Cope, while Hudson again commanded the opposition. Two thirds of taxable residents had to agree to annulment for the petition to go to the county, and the signatures were successfully collected. After Cope’s death in mid-1913, borough resident W. D. Harra assumed the task of presenting the formal petition for annulment. He brought his work before the county court in West Chester on August 25, 1913. Despite Thompson Hudson’s best efforts to change the court’s mind, West Chester granted annulment on December 23. Squire Thompson Hudson continued to appeal the decision into August of 1914, but it was to no avail.

The Borough of Hopewell was dissolved in early 1914, and its territory was returned to East Nottingham and Lower Oxford Townships.

In 1991, the Hopewell Historic District was created to preserve the remaining buildings of the former borough.

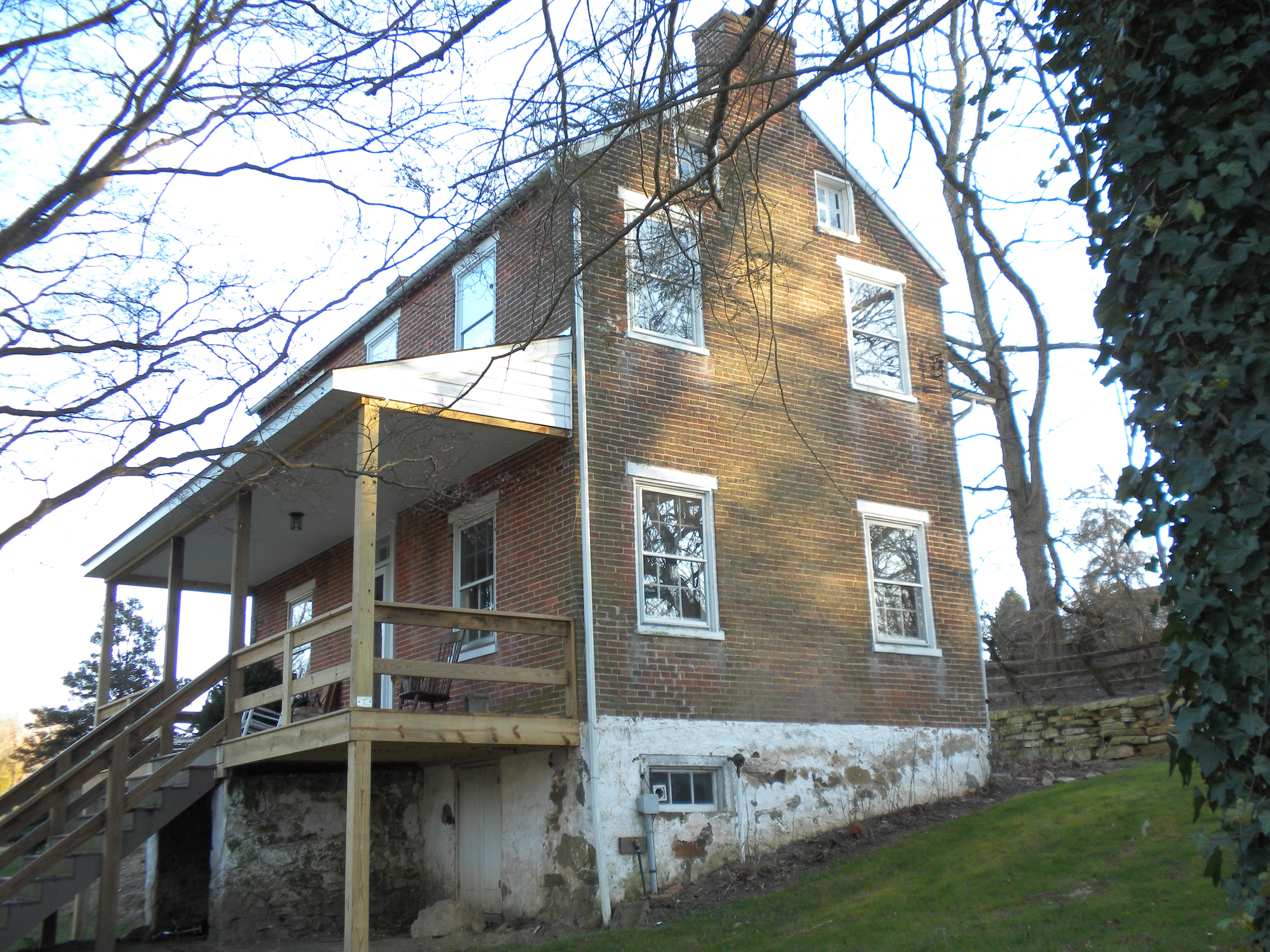
A house in the Hopewell Historic District

Historical population
Census	Pop.	Note	%±
1860	278		—
1870	268		−3.6%
1880	216		−19.4%
1890	213		−1.4%
1900	182		−14.6%
1910	136		−25.3%

=== Present day ===
Many of the buildings in the former borough, such as the Academy and Hopewell Post Office, are now contributing properties of the Hopewell Historic District. It is now also home to Hanover Farms, Hopewell UMC and Boy Scouts of America Troop 8.
