= Jim Herr =

American businessman (1924–2012)

- Born: James Staffer Herr; August 6, 1924; Lancaster, Pennsylvania, U.S.
- Died: April 5, 2012 (aged 87); West Nottingham Township, Pennsylvania, U.S.
- Known for: Founder and first chairman of Herr Foods Inc.

James Stauffer Herr (August 6, 1924–April 5, 2012) was an American businessman who founded Herr's, which manufacturers potato chips and other snack foods. Herr's Snacks, which was founded in 1946, is headquartered in Nottingham, Pennsylvania.

Herr was born in 1924 in Lancaster, Pennsylvania. He married Miriam "Mim" Hershey, in 1947. In 1951, Herr and his wife moved from Lancaster to Nottingham, Pennsylvania, where they raised five children.

In 1946, Herr started a small potato chip company, with sales of approximately thirty dollars a week. As of 2012, Herr's now has more than 1,000 employees, with annual sales of approximately $100 million. The company has become one of the major employers in Chester County and southern Lancaster County. Herr voluntarily stepped down as chairman of Herr's Snacks on January 7, 2005, in favor of his son, J.M. Herr. Herr retained his seat on the company's board of directors and held the title of "Founder of the Herr Foods Company" until his death.

In 1969, Herr was named Outstanding Pennsylvania Businessman of the Year. He became national president of the Potato Chip and Snack Food Association in 1979. Herr was also the recipient of the Pennsylvania Chamber of Business and Industry's Businessman of the Year Award in 1997.

In addition to his business, Herr was known for his work in community affairs and philanthropy. Herr served on the Chester County Board of School Directors for six years. He was elected to the school board of the Oxford Area School District for twelve years, including five years as the school board's president. Additionally, Herr became the director of the Building Campaign Chair for the Southern Chester County Health Services Medical Center and the Chester County Development Council.

Jim Herr died at his home in West Nottingham Township, Pennsylvania, at 10:12 p.m. on April 5, 2012, at the age of 87. He had suffered from bouts of severe pneumonia and respiratory illnesses since the summer of 2011. He was survived by his wife, 5 children, 20 grandchildren and 17 great-grandchildren.
