= Nottingham Township =

Nottingham Township may refer to:

- Nottingham Township, Wells County, Indiana
- Nottingham Township, New Jersey
- Nottingham Township, Harrison County, Ohio
- Nottingham Township, Pennsylvania
- East Nottingham Township, Pennsylvania
- West Nottingham Township, Pennsylvania
