= Herr (surname) =

Herr is a German surname. Notable people with the surname include:

- Aaron Herr (born 1981), American baseball player
- Alexander Herr (born 1978), German ski jumper
- Anita Herr (born 1987), Hungarian handball player
- Beth Herr (born 1964), American tennis player
- Claudius Herr (1775–1838), Austrian painter
- Dominique Herr (born 1965), Swiss footballer
- Frédéric-Georges Herr (1855–1932), French general
- Hans Herr (1639–1725), Swiss-born Mennonite bishop
- Howard Herr (born 1962), South African tennis player
- Hugh Herr (born 1964), American rock climber, engineer, and biophysicist
- Jim Herr (1924–2012), American businessman
- John Knowles Herr (1878–1955), American officer
- Lois Herr (born 1941), American politician
- Matt Herr (born 1976), American ice hockey player
- Michael Herr (1940–2016), American writer
- Michel Herr (born 1949), Belgian musician
- Orsolya Herr (born 1984), Hungarian handball player
- Regina Kopp-Herr (born 1957), German politician
- Richard Herr (born 1922), American historian and hispanist
- Richard D. Herr (born 1941), American vice admiral
- Spencer Herr (born 1974), American artist
- Tom Herr (born 1956), American baseball player
- Traugott Herr (1890–1976), German general
- Twila Herr (1946–2007), American-born Australian librarian and educator
