= David Krane =

American businessman

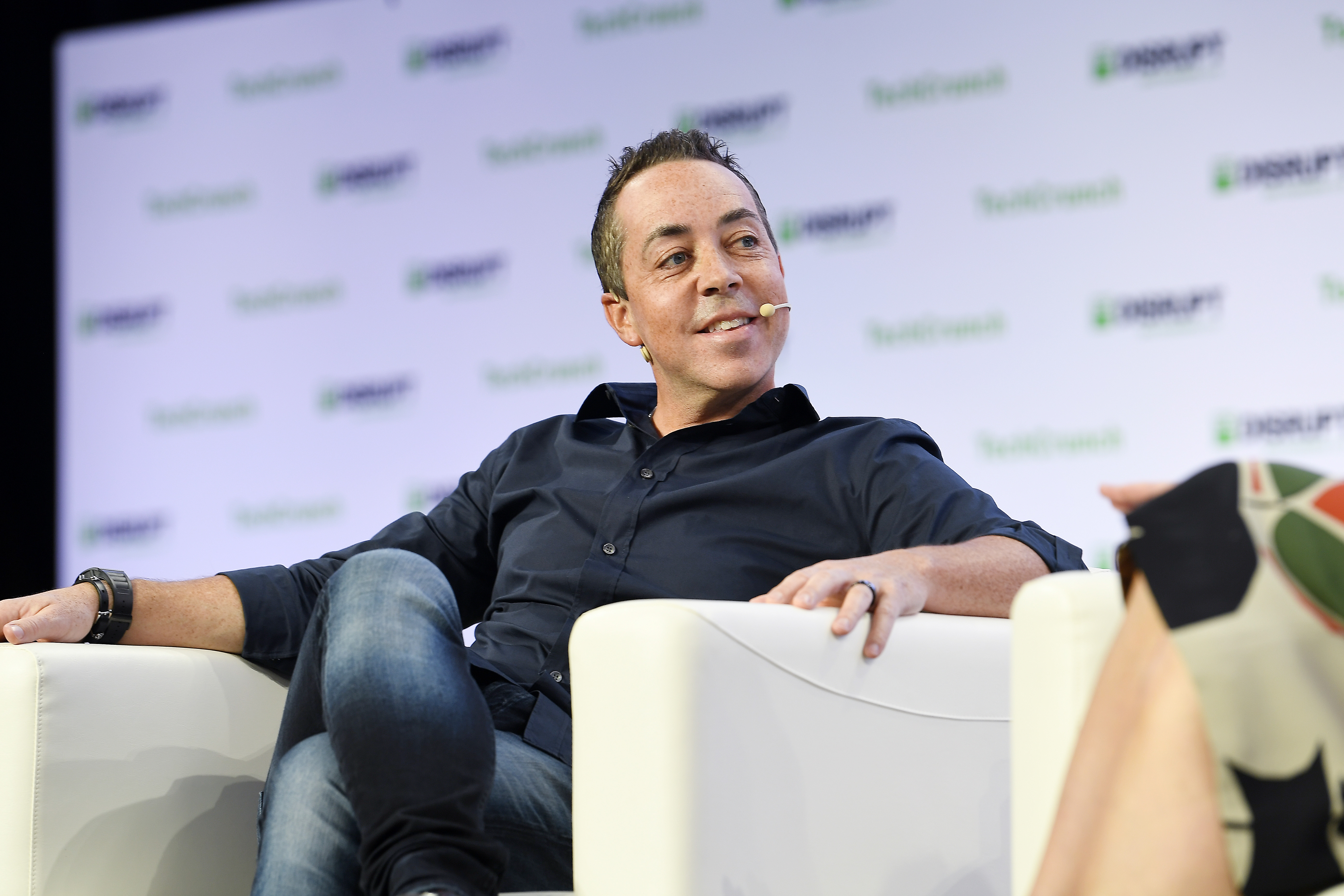
- Krane (2019)
- Born: David Krane
- Education: Indiana University Bloomington
- Known for: CEO of GV

David Krane is the CEO and managing partner at GV, where he was responsible for investments in Twyla, Juicero, StockX, Bored Ape Yacht Club, Yuga Labs, Airtime, HomeAway, and Blue Bottle Coffee. He was Google employee #84.

Krane received his Bachelor of Arts in journalism from Indiana University Bloomington. He currently serves on the Dean's advisory board for the IU School of Informatics and Computer Science. David is also a trustee of San Francisco's Contemporary Jewish Museum of Art.
