= Herrity =

Herrity is a surname. Notable people with the surname include:

- John F. Herrity (1932–2006), American businessman, lawyer and politician
- Pat Herrity, American politician
- Redmond Herrity, Irish sculptor

== See also ==
- Herr (disambiguation)
- Herrion
