= Twyla =

Twyla (also Twila) is a feminine given name. Notable people with the name include:

== Twyla ==
- Twyla Baker (born 1976), American Indian academic administrator
- Twyla Hansen (born 1949), American poet, a Nebraska State Poet
- Twyla Herbert (1921–2009), American songwriter
- Twyla Mason Gray (1954–2011), American politician from Oklahoma
- Twyla Roman (born 1941), American politician from Ohio
- Twyla Tharp (born 1941), American dancer, choreographer, and author
- Twyla Sands, a character on the television series Schitt's Creek
- Twyla, the daughter of a boogeyman from Monster High

== Twila ==
- Twila Herr (1946–2007), American-born Australian librarian and educator
- Twila Paris (born 1958), American singer-songwriter, author, and pianist
- Twila Shively (1920–1999), American baseball outfielder
- Twila, a character from the video game Mario Party 6
