= Old Bay Seasoning =

Seasoning brand manufactured in Maryland

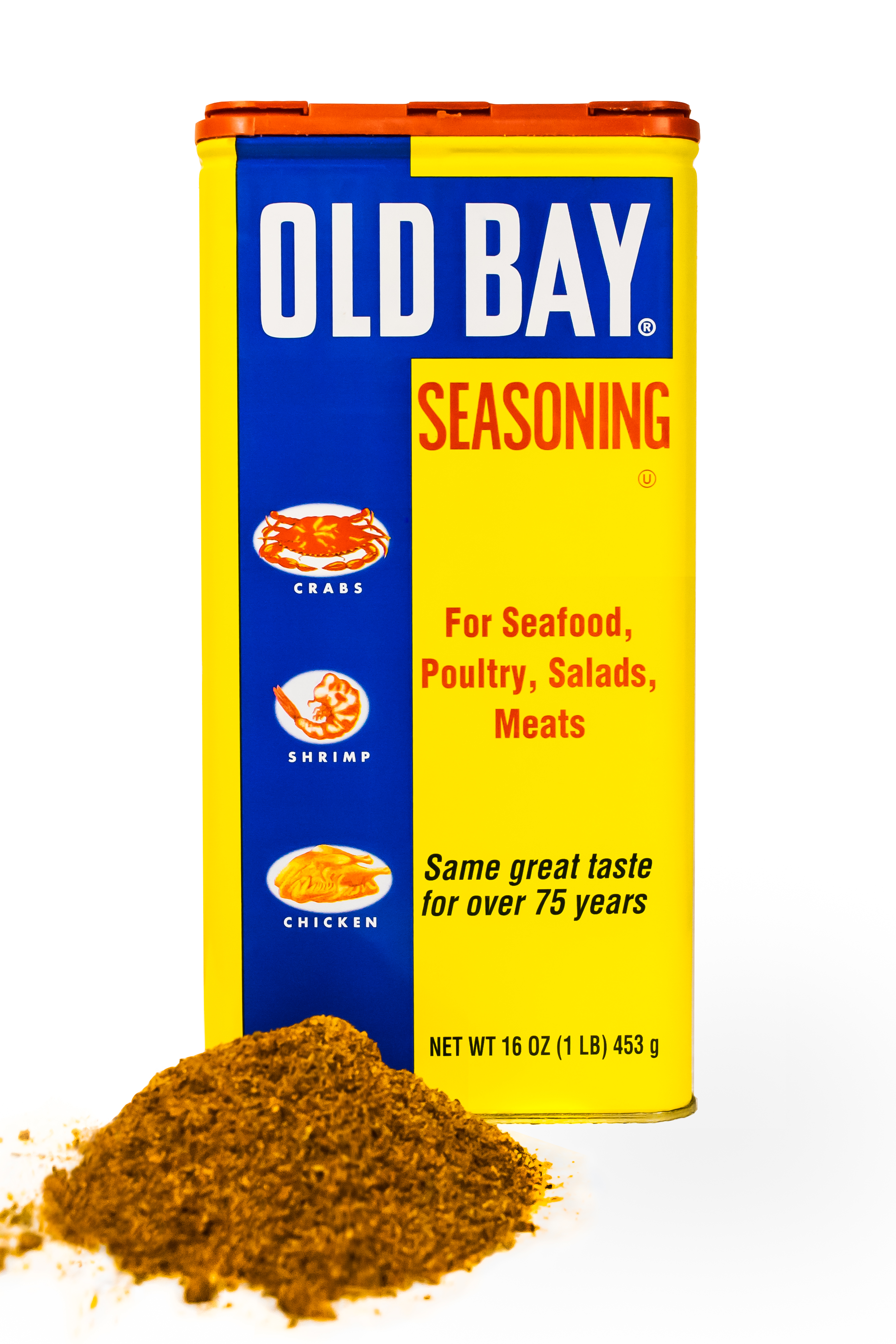
- Old Bay Seasoning's distinctive yellow tin, with a mound of the seasoning in front
- Type: Brand
- Industry: Food
- Founded: 1939, in Baltimore, Maryland, U.S.
- Parent: McCormick & Company
- Website: mccormick.com/old-bay

Old Bay Seasoning is a blend of herbs and spices originally created in Baltimore in 1939, with manufacturing passed to McCormick & Company in 1990.

The seasoning is a mix of 18 herbs and spices including celery salt (salt, celery seed), red pepper and black pepper, and paprika. Some of the other spices that may be used are bay leaves, mustard, cardamom, cloves and ginger as listed in the original product in the Baltimore Museum of Industry. It is regionally popular, especially in Maryland and Virginia, as well as in the other Mid-Atlantic states and parts of New England and the Gulf Coast.

== History ==
Old Bay Seasoning is named after the Baltimore Steam Packet Company (nicknamed the "Old Bay Line"), a passenger ship line that ran from Baltimore to Norfolk, Virginia, in the early 1900s. In 1939, a German-Jewish immigrant named Gustav Brunn started the Baltimore Spice Company.

The origins of the company can be traced back to Wertheim, Germany, where Brunn started a wholesale spice and seasoning business selling to food industries, seeing an opportunity as spices were in especially short supply amidst hyperinflation in the aftermath of World War I. After the Nazi Party rose to power, the company moved to Frankfurt; however, Kristallnacht led to Brunn being arrested and sent to Buchenwald concentration camp.

According to Brunn's son, Gustav's wife paid a large sum of money to a lawyer for him to be released; as they had already applied for and received American visas, they were able to escape with their two children to New York City and later Baltimore, where Brunn had family. There, having brought with him only a small spice grinder, Brunn founded the Baltimore Spice Company and produced the "Delicious Brand Shrimp and Crab Seasoning", which was later renamed Old Bay.

The rights to the seasoning brand were purchased by McCormick & Company of Hunt Valley, Maryland, in 1990. McCormick continued to offer Old Bay in the classic yellow can.

McCormick has a number of other products under the Old Bay banner, including seasoning packets for crab cakes, salmon patties and tuna; tartar sauce; cocktail sauce; and seafood batter mix. They also make other seasoning blends that mix Old Bay seasoning with garlic, lemon, brown sugar, herbs, and blackened seasonings. McCormick has offered a lower-sodium version of Old Bay Seasoning.

In 2017, McCormick changed the packaging (along with McCormick's own line of Pure Ground Black Pepper) from metal cans to plastic containers in an effort to reduce the packaging costs. McCormick has since changed back to metal cans for its line of Pure Ground Black Pepper; however, the plastic containers for Old Bay Seasoning remain the same. In December 2025, McCormick announced a return to the metal cans used before 2017.

== Usage ==
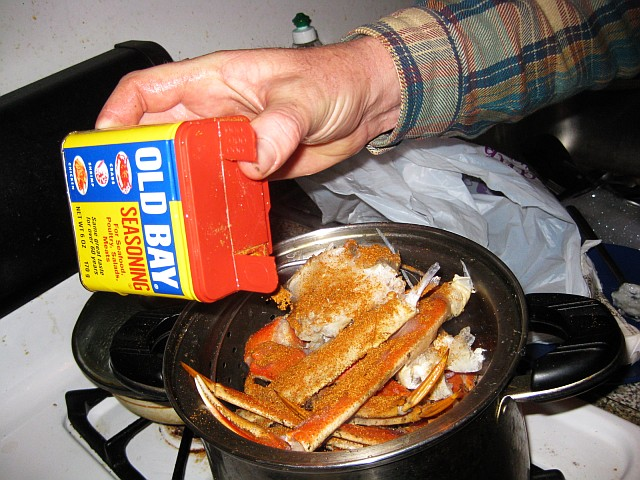
Putting Old Bay on crab legs

Old Bay is chiefly used to season crab and shrimp. It is used in various clam chowder and oyster stew recipes. The seasoning is also used as a topping on popcorn, salads, eggs, fried chicken, chicken wings, french fries, tater tots, corn on the cob, boiled peanuts, dips, chipped beef, baked potatoes, potato salad, potato chips and guacamole. Several movie theaters in the Chesapeake region offer it in the condiment section.

Potato chip manufacturer Utz of Hanover, Pennsylvania, created the "Crab Chip" flavor based on a similar mix of spices. Herr's of Nottingham, Pennsylvania, uses Old Bay itself for "Herr's Old Bay Chips". Lay's introduced its own "Chesapeake Bay Crab Spice" chips in 2018.

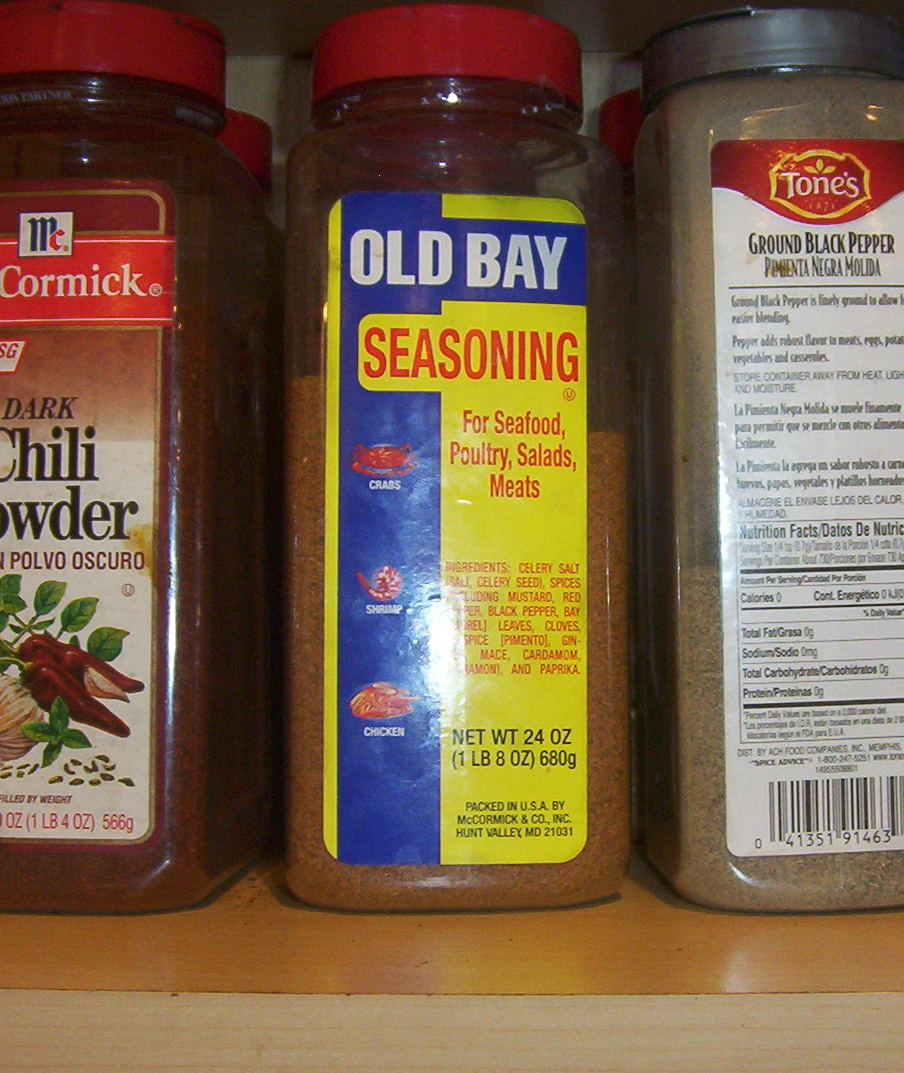
An Old Bay foodservice package

Early in its history, Subway used Old Bay when mixing their seafood and crab salad. Many local Subway shops still have Old Bay for use on sandwiches. Convenience store chain Sheetz also offers Old Bay as an option in its delis due to their large presence in the Mid-Atlantic region, including areas beyond Old Bay's traditional territory.

Old Bay is also occasionally used as an ingredient in Bloody Marys. Some bars in the Baltimore region also often sell what is known as a 'Crabby Bo', which is National Bohemian beer where the lip of the glass or mug being used is moistened and dipped into a container of Old Bay seasoning. In 2014, Frederick, Maryland-based brewery Flying Dog created an Old Bay-inspired summer ale named Dead Rise to celebrate the seasoning's 75th anniversary. In 2022, McCormick collaborated with George's Beverage Company to produce Old Bay vodka.

In 2020, McCormick created Old Bay Hot Sauce in advance of Super Bowl LIV, which initially sold out within 30 minutes of its launch and caused the Old Bay website to crash temporarily. Some customers resold the 10-US-fluid-ounce (300 ml) bottles, retailing for $3.49, online for between $50 and $200. In 2022, the company collaborated with Pepperidge Farm to produce Old Bay-flavored Goldfish crackers, which initially sold out online within nine hours.
