= White supremacy in U.S. school curriculum =

Scholars of education have studied white supremacy in the school curriculum and school system of the United States, or the inclusion and perpetuation of narratives in educational materials that elevate and normalize white perspectives while marginalizing or misrepresenting the experiences and contributions of non-white groups.

According to Ladson-Billings and Tate, white supremacy, the belief that white people are a superior race, has pervasive and widespread influence in the society of the United States. In U.S. school curricula, authors Carter G. Woodson, Ellen Swartz, and others have described the manifestation of unequal race relations through the overrepresentation of the values, views, histories, and accomplishments associated with Western Europeans and White Americans and the underrepresentation of the practices, histories, and accomplishments of non-white racial groups.

== Theory ==
Some historical and contemporary scholars argue that White supremacy characterizes all of the political, economic, social, and cultural institutions of the United States, and that this makes it a pervasive force that is a part of everyone's lives, down to personal identity. Being an institution, school systems also operate within the biases of larger society. In a book on how curriculum is chosen and structured, Marion Brady writes that the majority of any given society does not recognize the specific norms that structure it, despite the fact that these norms are peculiar to that particular society. She likens individuals' and societies' relationship to these norms to "the old saying 'A fish would be the last to discover water.'" Within the context of U.S. education, curriculum studies, history, and ethnic studies scholars have maintained that curriculum choices reflect the Eurocentrist bias present in broader U.S. culture. This occurs through subtle but pervasive endorsements of the hegemony of White Americans as the colonizers of the United States.

Au et al. (2016) argue that White supremacy was used in curricula by White Americans, the racial majority in the United States, to assert their dominant position in society at large. For example, stereotypes about Black people that implied they were undeserving of equality with Whites proliferated in textbooks after the Civil War. Additionally, in the late 19th and early-to-mid 20th centuries, the government ran boarding schools for Native American children in an effort to assimilate Native peoples into White American society. Many White Americans at this time explicitly intended to enact cultural genocide on the native peoples, thus removing them as threats. Finally, scholars have argued that White supremacy was perpetuated through both the presentation of Whites' superiority and others' inferiority as fact, and through the specific disadvantaging of other racial groups through lower-quality coursework. Some of these same authors have determined that presenting Whites as superior enabled White Americans to exploit and oppress non-White groups and maintain positions of privilege. Historian Carter G. Woodson argues in The Miseducation of the Negro, "there would be no lynching if it did not start in the schoolroom."

=== Eurocentrism ===
In "Revisionist Ontologies: Theorizing White Supremacy," Mills theorizes traditional academic disciplines as really only concerning the herrenvolk, or the dominant and oppressing (as opposed to oppressed) group in society—in the case of the modern world, White people. He writes that because history, and other fields of study have really been only the White versions of these disciplines, academia has historically suffered from a White gaze. Mills argued this has left non-White peoples out of numerous academic discourses, save for some ethnicity and race-specific courses off to the sides. He also argues that there is a consistent downplay of various White acts of violence, including the "colonization" of the western hemisphere, slavery, imperialism, lynching, and racist policies toward immigrants (for example, the Chinese Exclusion Act).

Swartz (1992) and King (2014) describe school curriculum as being structured by what they call a masternarrative. Swartz defines this term as an account of reality that advances and reaffirms White people's dominance in American society through the centering of White achievements and experiences, while consistently omitting, simplifying, and "distorting" non-White peoples'. Swartz, like Mills (1994), notes the fact that in some textbook writing, the supposedly universal "we" used in historical discussions really applies only to White people (and then, only to male and property-owning people).

Scholars argue that eurocentrism in U.S. society has led to school and government officials treating students of color with non-European cultures as needing "Americanization," which, in context, has meant assimilation into White American culture. Especially earlier centuries, this treatment largely stemmed from the assumption that the culture White Americans had inherited from their European ancestors was superior to the cultures of other demographics. Scholars argue that emphasizing Whiteness as the default of the American experience empowers White Americans at the expense of the identities of non-White Americans and leads students of color to feel detached from their school environments. In addition, presenting Whiteness as the default contributes to students of colors' own internalizations of White supremacy, and therefore a view that they are racially inferior.

Brown & Brown (2010), Huber et al. (2006), and Boutte (2008) argue that instances of White supremacy in contemporary curriculum are often overlooked and allowed to continue in U.S. schools. These and multiple other scholars push for the revision of school curriculum and teaching methods in order to create equitable education for students of different races, including Hudley and Mallinson (2012), Crawford (1994), Boutte (2005), and Brown and Brown (2010). Alternatively, Mills and Boutte argue continuing to teach in ways that do not actively address race will perpetuate White supremacy. In "A Spectacular Secret:’ Understanding the Cultural Memory of Racial Violence in K-12 Official School Textbooks in the Era of Obama,” Brown and Brown assert that some Americans only began to consider the United States a post-racial society with the election of President Obama because U.S. schools do not introduce students to the idea that racism is systemic, and that racial inequality will not go away unless proactively sought out and removed.

== White cultural hegemony ==
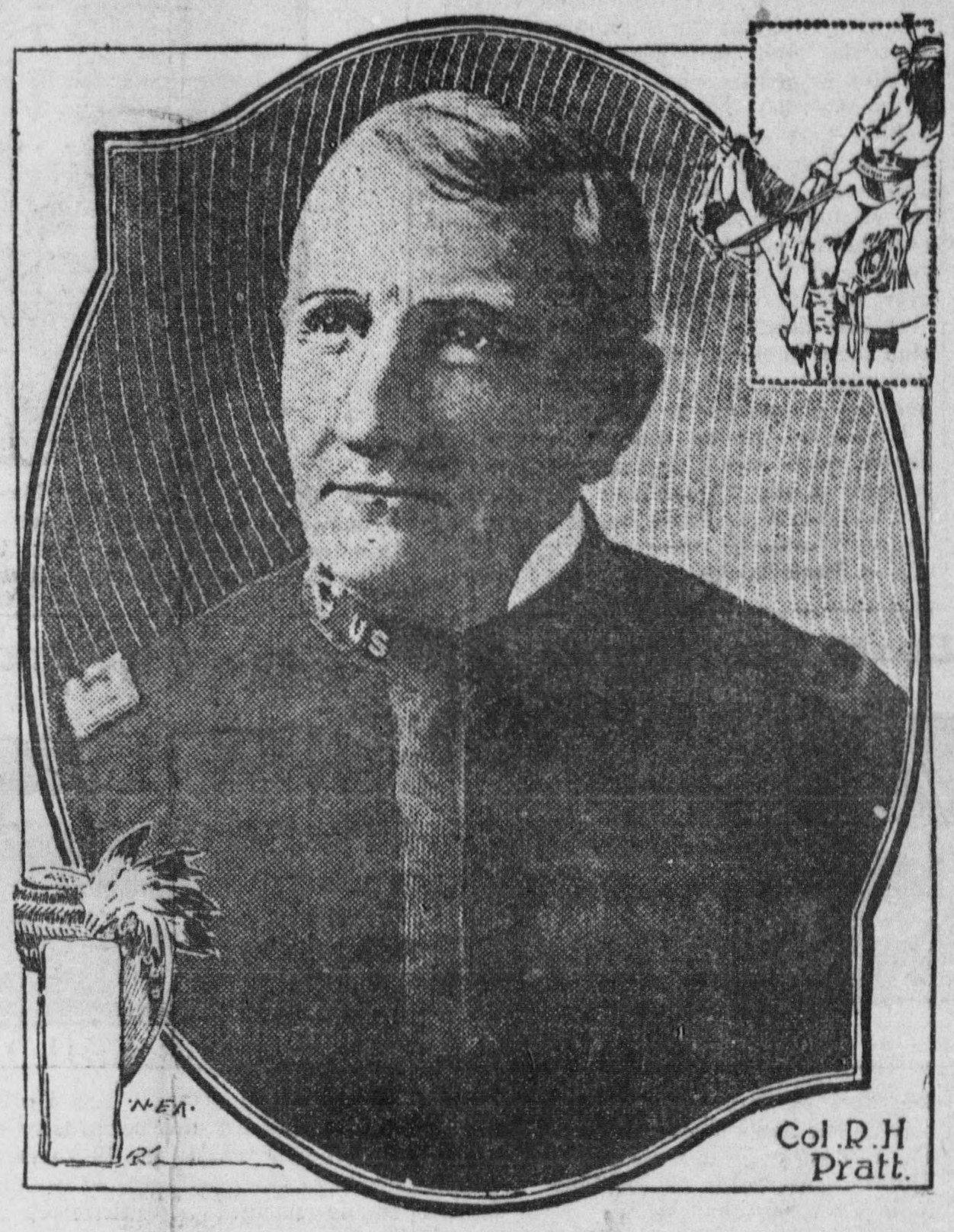
Richard Henry Pratt founded the first Native American boarding school, Carlisle. He intended to "solve the Indian Problem" with the cultural conversion of Native Americans to White American culture through education.

Additionally, instruction that implicitly endorses White American cultural values and expectations can ultimately require students from different racial and cultural backgrounds to estrange themselves from their original cultures and identities and aspire to White cultural norms (p. 74).

Au (1972) and Swartz (1992) argue that White Americans have used curriculum to maintain the centrality of White people and White culture in the United States: when non-White racial groups had different cultural practices, the White American majority, and by extension the U.S. government, often saw these demographics as threats to the integrity of "American" culture. In the cases of Native Americans, Mexican Americans, and Asian Americans, local and federal officials sought to prevent the education of these groups' youths in ways that were traditional to their cultures, and instead promulgated curriculum that affirmed European/Euro-American values and attitudes. More specifically, in the early 1900s, Chinese and Japanese Americans experienced large amounts of xenophobia (see Yellow Peril) because of White hostility to the cultural changes Asian immigrants were bringing about, and as a result, several decrees were passed in California schools that severely limited the amount of material Asian-descended students could learn about their ancestral countries, and required them to learn Euro-American history and patriotism for the U.S. In a recent incident, the Tucson Unified School District temporarily banned Mexican American Studies in 2012 (this has since been declared unconstitutional).

=== Cultural genocide in Native American boarding schools ===
Beginning with early colonization and continuing into the 1900s, many White Americans firmly believed in the superiority of European culture to that of the Natives (and in general). White Americans and the U.S. government explicitly sought to eliminate indigenous cultures, thus accomplishing a cultural genocide of Native Americans, through the Eurocentric education of indigenous children from the late 1800s to the mid-1900s. Beginning in 1879, the government established and funded off-reservation boarding schools designed to immerse native children in White/Euro-American culture and dissuade the continuation of their cultures' traditional practices. Upon arrival, students' important cultural markers of native cultures were changed to adhere to European standards. Namely, their hair was cut, and each student was given a new, English name. In their time at schools, students were required to wear European dress, refrain from any religious practices, games, or other traditions from their tribes, and speak English at all times. Christianity was also a central part of the school experience, with the Bible frequently being used for reading exercises and weekly church attendance often being required. Children were also educated to be patriotic toward the United States, despite the fact that this meant accepting a country which defined itself in terms of the subordination and assimilation of Native peoples. The intended effect of the curricula of these boarding schools was to forward a worldview characteristic to White Americans at the time, that affirmed the superiority of White Americans and their culture.

=== Language ===
In Understanding English Language Variation in U.S. Schools, authors Hudley and Mallinson discuss the wide range of types of English spoken around the country (and around the world). They recognize that "standardized English," the version of English used in schools, is not the default, objective version of the language, but rather the version spoken by those in dominant cultural and political positions in society, which have historically been White people. They argue that teaching standardized English in U.S. schools privileges some students, namely middle-class White students, while creating obstacles for others. Students who speak standardized English in their households will be able to rely on these seven privileges:

1) They will understand the readings, and media they are exposed to at school

2) They will not be ridiculed or socially excluded because of their speech patterns

3) Other people will not assume they are less smart based on their language

4) They will fully comprehend directions given in schoolwork and assessments

5) They will understand their teachers and other school authorities, and these authorities will understand them

6) Mainstream culture will not make fun of the way they talk

7) Their natural speech habits will be acceptable to use with regard to testing at school, communication with individuals in authority, and in professional settings, such as applying for jobs.

At the same time, students who grow up speaking other dialects will have greater difficulty in school, experiencing the opposite of these privileges.

== Race narratives ==
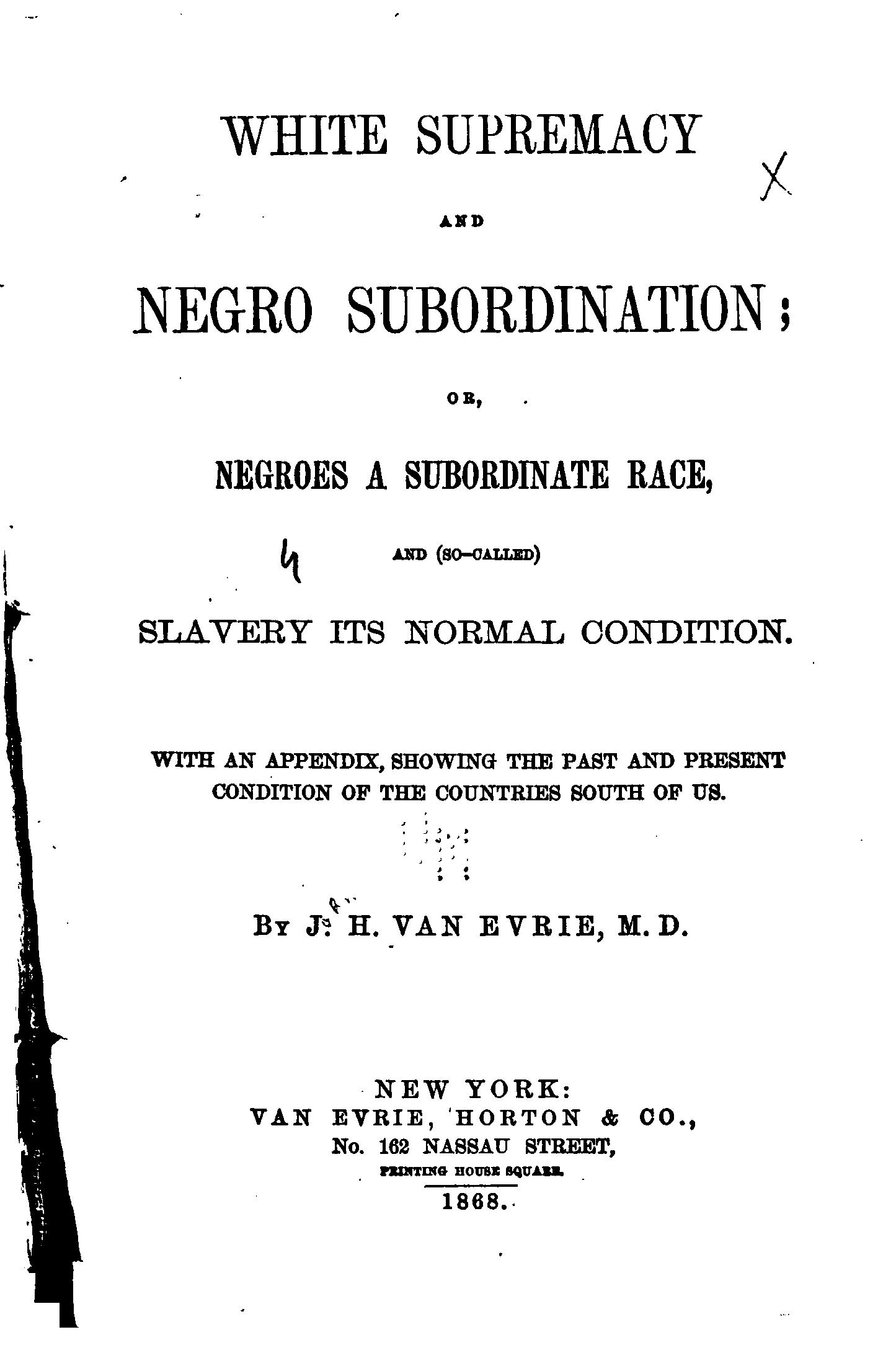
Title page of a book by John H. Van Erie, arguing that slavery was natural for Black Americans

In earlier centuries, U.S. school curriculum has taught explicitly racist ideologies as fact. Nineteenth-century geography textbooks were used to teach children about different races (presumed to be fixed, naturally occurring categories at the time) within the context of a racial hierarchy. These hierarchies consistently ranked White people as the superior race and often treated them as the natural standard for humanity. The ideals of white American identity are passed down through the writing of multiple generations. Authors integrate whiteness as something that can be inherited nationally in order to maintain the principles of American life and democracy. In 1925, Charles H. Wesley, a Black scholar, observed through textbooks and classroom settings that the common cultural theme with Black students is that their "badge of color in America is a sign of subjugation, inferiority, and contempt." A later study revealed that textbooks purposely engrain white supremacy into the minds of young children, this reveals how hatred is generated against African Americans. For example, it was assumed that Adam and Eve were White. Descriptions of non-White peoples in 19th-century textbooks included pseudo-scientific ascriptions of inferiority. People of African descent were widely characterized as unintelligent, immature, and poorly equipped to handle themselves without the assistance of White people. Racial minorities were often depicted in outlandish terms that created a sense of otherness. For example, in one textbook, people of Chinese nationality or heritage were described as "queer little Chinamen, with pigtails and slanting eyes."

=== Anti-Black narratives ===
A vast array of negative images and narratives about Black people, and Black Americans in particular, have been constructed and used in school curriculum to the effect of maintaining White supremacy in the U.S. Critical appraisals of African-descended peoples have been used to justify their enslavement and exploitation by Whites since the Enlightenment Era, as well as their continued struggles with poverty after Reconstruction. Elson (1964) provides a comprehensive analysis of U.S. textbooks in the 19th century. She makes note that the same Geography courses that taught that Whites were at the top of the racial hierarchy taught that Black people were on the bottom rung. Some textbooks spoke of Africans as lacking humanity except in their physical appearance, which even then was criticized against White norms. This type of observation extended to Black Americans too, since races were judged to be fixed categories at the time. Stereotypes that Black people were irresponsible, childlike, and naturally subordinate to Whites appeared in reading comprehension exercises and math problems in elementary school textbooks. In one textbook, an author wrote, "[n]ature has formed the different degrees of genius, and the characters of nations, which are seldom to change. Hench the negros are slaves to other men," thereby implying that slavery and other inferior positions in society were natural places for Black people. Throughout most of America's history, many have put all the blame on Southern slavery for the racial inequality that continues to exist. Also, slave owners and their descendants are seen to also play a role in this continuity of suppression. Overall, American democracy has relied on Black inequality to keep white equality maintained.

After the Reconstruction Era in the US, in response to the desegregation of public schools, many White Southern Segregationist women advocated against students having access to textbooks that would promote racial tolerance and communism. Organizations like the Daughters of the American Revolution supported the "proper teaching of American History in all its public institutions of learning" and in 1965, released a list of 165 textbooks deemed unsatisfactory for American schools. This objection to the school curriculum reached state governments, where officials like Governor Ross Barnett released a more restrictive list of textbooks and authors, specifically targeting "leftwingers, liberal, integrationists, and subversive writers" many of whom were Black authors. Textbook censorship in American schools continued to maintain the White supremacist values and supported "teaching" White youth the values of a conservative and segregated society.

After the Civil War, images of Black Americans continued to reinforce the idea that they were not fully equal participants in U.S. society. When it came to History, Black Americans were rarely mentioned as free people, and discussions of Black Americans' history started with slavery, rather than their heritage from African tribes (this information was not recorded during the slave trade). Furthermore, scientific racism, the use of pseudo-scientific research to argue for the inferiority of some races to others, figured prominently in discussions of Black people in biology during the 18th century. Violence against Black people has also been normalized through the frequent and sometimes casual representations of them in situations of suffering. Beginning in 1875 and moving into the mid-20th century, a poem titled Ten Little Nigger Boys, which features 10 Black children dying off one by one, was used as a counting exercise for children.

=== Mexican Americans ===
As White Americans moved west in the 19th century, they came into contact both with purely indigenous peoples and with populations formerly a part of the Spanish colonial empire. When White Americans colonized the southwest United States after the Mexican American War, they treated the Mexicans who inhabited the lands of New Mexico and Texas as racially inferior to Whites, mostly due to their indigenous heritage. As White Americans developed schools in these regions, Mexican Americans were often allowed to attend; however, the racial discourse of the time dictated that Mexican Americans were intellectually inferior to Whites, and this was used to justify the "curricular segregation" of Mexican American students. Curricular segregation entailed separating Mexican American students from their White peers and placing them in less intellectually engaging, more manual skill-focused courses of study that supposedly better fit their mental capabilities. Exposing Mexican Americans to less challenging, lower-quality curriculum severely undercut the quality of education received by Mexican Americans, forcing them to remain in underprivileged economic and political circumstances. Today, Huber et al. (2006) also argues that Mexican Americans are permanently depicted as outsiders to American society, and their contributions to American society are not mentioned in today's curriculum.

== Effects ==
At the societal level, some scholars argue that White supremacy in curriculum may contribute to the perpetuation of White supremacy, affecting future generations. Huber et al. (2006) writes that Euro- or White-centric curriculum can contribute to the normalization of racial inequality and tolerance of White dominance. Brown and Brown (2010) also state that if schools continue to not teach about systemic racism, students will grow up to be “apathetic” about Black victims of mass incarceration and gun-related violence, as well as the disproportionate suffering experienced by Black Americans after natural disasters.

=== Internalized racism ===
Huber et al. explain in "Naming Racism: A Conceptual Look at Internalized Racism in U.S. Schools" that the underrepresentation of racial minorities in school curriculum leads to internalized racism, or the belief in the superiority of some races over others (i.e. Whites over Latino/as, Blacks, etc.). They also maintain that internalized racism for non-White students may "damage [the] self-concept[s] of non-White students" and lead to decreased academic performance. Crawford (1992) and Hudley and Mallinson (2012) state that non-White students may struggle in school and in life due to their races’ and cultures’ marginalization in curriculum. In "An Analysis of Textbooks Relative to the Treatment of Black Americans," Allen raises concerns about the lack of opportunities to see themselves as having academic or professional potential. These authors assert that lack of meaningful use and discussion of non-White perspectives, practices, and feats may lead minority students to feel disillusioned with school, to disengage from learning, and to doubt their own capabilities. In 1951, three years before the Supreme Court decision in Brown v. Board of Education, black students at Adkin High School discussed what the best school would consist of as an assignment for their class. They later noticed that all the things they discussed described the nearby white school. This is what fueled a protest against these inequalities. After eighteen months of protesting by not showing up to school, Adkin High School fixed some of its issues although it did not desegregate until 1970. This is a prime example of lack of opportunity and limiting one's fullest potential as these black students were not being fairly treated.

=== "Acting White" ===
One of the main goals for the Civil Rights Movement was to desegregate United States public schools. Brown v. Board of Education, a major U.S. Supreme Court case, marked segregation in schools unconstitutional. This legal case allowed African Americans to receive an equal education even though it was not easy to accomplish. Till this day, debate continues on how to reduce the achievement gap between minority and white children. Black and Latino students' academic achievements may also be impacted by their avoidance of "acting White," an often negative label for students in these racial groups who pursue academic excellence. According to Hudley and Mallinson and Fryer (2012), the phenomenon of “acting White” comes from seeing academic success as coming hand in hand with Whiteness, or for some non-White students, the abandonment of their original cultures in order to succeed in a White-culture-normative society. In this case, academic success is coupled with accepting the Eurocentric practices used by schools, which means self-disenfranchisement. This social stigma of “acting White” may discourage strivings for academic success among Black and Hispanic students. Fryer (2012) explains that Hispanic students' popularity starts to decline relative to their grade point average after they attain a 2.5; for Black students, this number is a 3.5; for White students, this relationship does not appear to occur. While there is conflicting evidence on the presence of this stigma, fear of "acting White" may play a quite a meaningful role in the achievement gap between White Americans and Black and Hispanic Americans, with one group of authors arguing that, if the relationship between grades and popularity were the same for Black students as it is for Whites, the margin between the groups test scores would decrease by 10%, and the margin between their homework time allotment would decrease by 60%.

== Reform ==
=== Historical ===
A variety of efforts to restructure school curriculum in more racially balanced ways have been made throughout U.S. History. In the early 20th century, numerous Black educators and scholars introduced research, textbooks, and children's books that provided positive counter-narratives about Black people. Lelia Amos Pendleton generated textbooks designed to educate about Black Americans' contributions and experiences in the U.S. Additionally, Du Bois, Jessie Fause, Arna Bontemps, and Paul Lawrence Dunbar have published books for children to provide alternatives to racist children's books in the early 20th century. For Latino Americans, victories were won over the segregation of Mexican Americans from White coursework over the course of the first half of the 20th century due to parent and activist advocacy. Also over the course of the 20th century, Native Americans have taken over the boarding schools set up by the government, and material is now taught that "celebrates," rather than eliminates, Native knowledge and culture. Efforts are also currently being made to recover Native languages from the endangered status.

=== Contemporary ===
Since the 1960s, Black or African or Africana Studies have been generating research about Black histories and experiences, filling gaps and rectifying distorted narratives in Eurocentric academia. These disciplines help to accomplish what Mills (1994) encourages as the reveal of the pervasive bias toward White perspectives seen in universities. Supplemental and alternative curricula are currently being circulated throughout primary and secondary education systems, particularly in response to the Black Lives Matter movement. The Zinn Project encourages a stronger focus on traditionally marginalized groups' contributions to U.S. history through the use of textbooks such as A People's History of the United States. Black Lives Matter at School aims to better inform students of U.S. racial dynamics by providing antiracist materials for teachers to incorporate into their curricula. Critical conversations, like the murder of George Floyd, tend to be silenced in classroom settings which stops disagreements, discussions, or debates over certain issues. This silences the conversations that need to occur, which only exacerbates the issue. John Diamond, a Brown University sociology and education policy professor, explains that "when young people raise their voices in protest, they're often silenced in schools, they're often told that their demeanor is not appropriate, they're often told to be quiet. These are efforts to sort of silence dissent so that there's a consolidation of white supremacy structurally that can continue."

In Yacovone's book, Teaching White Supremacy: America's Democratic Ordeal and the Forging of Our National Identity, he emphasizes that silencing or refusing to teach is essentially teaching white supremacy. This ideology is "undeniable and defining." In his book, he mentions a quote by Arthur M. Schlesinger Jr. that says "White Americans began as a people so arrogant in convictions of racial superiority that they felt licensed to kill red people, to enslave black people, and to import yellow and brown people for peon labor. We white Americans have been racist in our customs, in our conditioned reflexes, in our souls." This feeling of superiority is what led to these mass killings of certain groups of people. Racism is heavily ingrained in American history and still in the consciousness of those today.
