= OAHS =

OAHS may refer to:

- Oxford Area High School
- Oxfordshire Architectural and Historical Society
