= Air time =

Air time or airtime may refer to:

- Air time (broadcasting), also spelled "airtime", available hours for broadcast or time purchased for broadcast
- Air time (mobile phone), also spelled "airtime", top-up for mobile roaming services
- Air time (rides), also spelled "airtime", negative g-force producing a sensation of weightlessness in amusement rides
- Air time (parachuting), also spelled "airtime", time before the parachute opens in skydiving
- Air time, also spelled "airtime", amount of radio airplay for a record in popular music
- Air time, also spelled "airtime", the measurement of the portion of a flight that is off the ground in aviation.

== Entertainment ==
- Airtime (band), 2007 project of Canadian guitarist Rik Emmett
- Air Time, 1978 jazz album by Air
- Air Time: The Best of Glass Tiger, album 1993
- Air Time '57, 1957 TV series
- Michael Jordan Air Time, 1992 documentary TV film of Michael Jordan and the Chicago Bulls' 1991–92 season

== Business ==
- Airtime (software), freeware radio management application originally named LiveSupport, and then Campcaster, developed in 2003 by Micz Flor, a German new-media developer
- Airtime.com, live video website
- Airtime Television TV news broadcast syndication agency and production company based at London Heathrow Airport
- Airtime Management and Programming Sdn Bhd, Malaysian broadcaster, now Astro Radio
- Airtime Products, defunct Australian aircraft manufacturer specialized in the design and manufacture of paramotors
  - Airtime Discovery, Australian paramotor for powered paragliding
  - Airtime Explorer, an Australian powered hang glider that was designed and produced by Airtime Products of Airlie Beach, Queensland. Now out of production
