= Hopewell Historic District =

Historic district in Pennsylvania, United States

- U.S. National Register of Historic Places
- U.S. Historic district
- Pennsylvania state historical marker
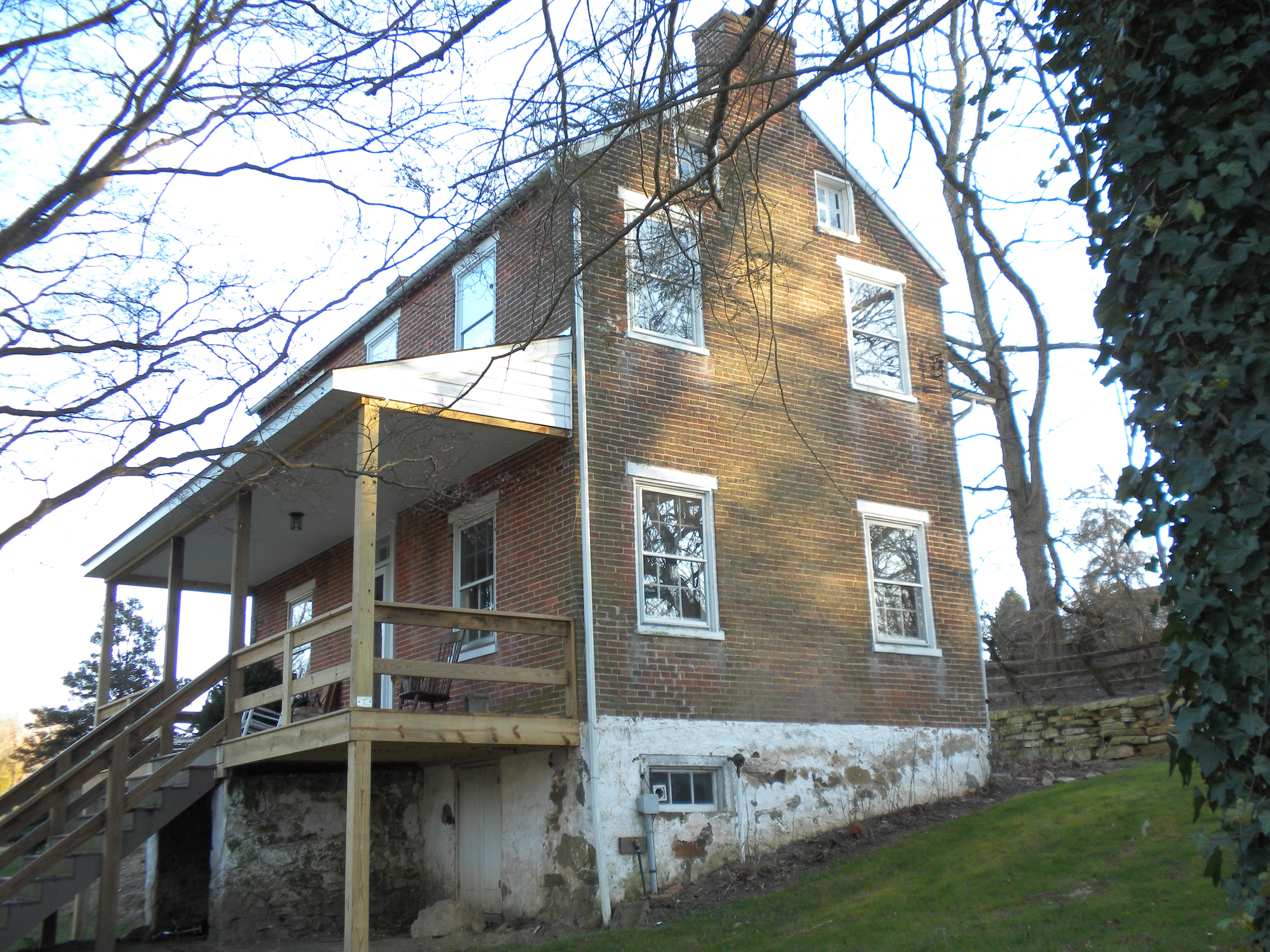
- House in the Hopewell Historic District, December 2009

- Location within Pennsylvania Location within the United States
- Location: Roughly, Hopewell Rd. from Lower Hopewell Rd. to Roneys Corner Rd. and area S, and Lower Hopewell Rd. N past Calvery Rd., East Nottingham Township and Lower Oxford Township, Pennsylvania
- Coordinates: 39°46′46″N 76°01′01″W
- Area: 138 acres (56 ha)
- Built: 1853
- Architectural style: Georgian, Vernacular Penn
- NRHP reference No.: 91000226

Significant dates
- Added to NRHP: February 28, 1991
- Designated PHMC: November 10, 1996

The Hopewell Historic District is a national historic district which is located in East Nottingham Township and Lower Oxford Township, Chester County, Pennsylvania.

The district encompasses remaining structures from the former borough of Hopewell, and was added to the National Register of Historic Places in 1991.

== History and architectural features ==
It encompasses twenty-six contributing buildings, eight contributing sites, and two contributing structures which are located in the former borough of Hopewell. This district largely consists of a variety of stone and brick residences and outbuildings that were built between 1810 and 1914. They include examples of Georgian and vernacular styles. Notable properties include the Col. David Dickey House-Hopewell Academy, which was built circa 1814, the Samuel Dickey Farm, the Schoolhouse/Lyceum Building, which was erected in 1888, the Lower Mill, which was built circa 1815, the site of the Upper Mill, a store/post office, which was built sometime around 1810, five tenant houses, and three bridges.
