= Herrenvolk (disambiguation) =

Herrenvolk, meaning "master race", is a concept in Nazi ideology. It may also refer to:

- Herrenvolk democracy, a term describing a system of government that offers democratic participation to the dominant ethnic group only
- "Herrenvolk" (The X-Files), an episode of the TV series

== See also ==
- Herr (disambiguation)
- Volk (disambiguation)
- Master Race (disambiguation)
