= Nueta Hidatsa Sahnish College =

Community college in North Dakota, U.S.

- Type: Public tribal land-grant college
- Established: 1973; 53 years ago
- Academic affiliations: American Indian Higher Education Consortium, Space-grant
- President: Twyla Baker
- Students: 300
- Location: New Town, North Dakota, United States; 47°58′58″N 102°28′22″W
- Campus: Rural
- Tribal associations: Mandan, Hidatsa, and Arikara Nation
- Colors: Blue and silver
- Nickname: The Storm
- Website: www.nhsc.edu

Nueta Hidatsa Sahnish College is a public tribal land-grant college in New Town, North Dakota. Chartered by the Three Affiliated Tribes of the Fort Berthold Reservation, the college awards associate and bachelor’s degrees. In addition to its main campus in New Town, the college operates branches in Mandaree and White Shield.

== History ==
The college was founded May 2, 1973, as the agency responsible for higher education on the Fort Berthold Reservation. The Three Affiliated Tribes of the Fort Berthold Reservation in New Town, North Dakota endorsed the concept that a locally based higher education institution was needed to train Tribal members and to help retain the tribal cultures. The college was chartered by the Three Affiliated Tribes.

In 1994, the college was designated a land-grant college alongside 31 other tribal colleges.

== Governance ==
Nueta Hidatsa Sahnish College is tribally controlled by a board of directors, which consist of seven members. A steering committee was appointed to oversee the initial operations of the college. This committee was replaced by the selection of a board of directors in 1974 who began plans to improve the educational and vocational services in the communities throughout the reservation.

== Academics ==
Undergraduate demographics as of Fall 2023
| Race and ethnicity | Total |
|---|---|
| American Indian/Alaska Native | 78% |
| White | 8% |
| Hispanic | 6% |
| Two or more races | 6% |
| Black | 1% |
| Native Hawaiian/Pacific Islander | 1% |
Economic diversity
| Low-income (Note: The percentage of students who received an income-based federal Pell grant intended for low-income students.) | 29% |
| Affluent (Note: The percentage of students who are a part of the American middle class at the bare minimum.) | 71% |

The first classes offered at Nueta Hidatsa Sahnish College were on an extension basis with coordinating accredited institutions. The agreements were first made with University of Mary, Bismarck, ND; Minot State College, Minot, ND; and the University of North Dakota, Williston Center, Williston, ND. The college offers associate degree and certificate programs. As of 2011, it is one of seven tribal colleges in the U.S. to offer a degree related to tribal administration.
