= Herr =

Herr may refer to:

- Herr (surname), a German surname
- Herr (title), a German title
- Herr's, an American brand of potato chips and other snack foods
