= Master Race (disambiguation) =

The master race, or Herrenvolk, is a concept of racial superiority, mainly linked with Nazi Germany.

Master Race may also refer to:

== Film and television ==
- The Master Race (film) an American film Anne Froelick
- "Master Race - 1933", episode of documentary series People's Century

== Books ==
- Master Race, a 1955 book by Keith Botsford
- "Master Race" (EC Comics), a 1955 EC Comics short story drawn by Bernard Krigstein
- The Dark Knight III: The Master Race, a 2015 comic series

== Music ==
- "Master Race" by New Model Army from The Ghost of Cain 1986
- "Master Race" by Rick Wakeman composed Wakeman from Lisztomania 1975
- "Master Race (In Outer Space)" by The Vandals Composed by Joe Escalante from When in Rome Do as The Vandals 1984
- "No Master Race" by The Unseen from The Anger and the Truth
- "Master Race Rock", by The Dictators, Andy Shernoff from Go Girl Crazy! 1975

== Other ==
- PC Master Race, a term used by gamers using personal computers to refer to themselves

== See also ==
- Herrenvolk (disambiguation)
