= Airtime Products =

Australian aircraft manufacturer

- Company type: Privately held company
- Industry: Aerospace
- Headquarters: Airlie Beach, Queensland, Australia
- Products: Paramotors and powered hang gliders

Airtime Products was an Australian aircraft manufacturer based in Airlie Beach, Queensland. The company specialized in the design and manufacture of paramotors and powered hang gliders in the form of ready-to-fly aircraft for the US FAR 103 Ultralight Vehicles rules as well as the European and Australian microlight categories.

The company was active in the mid-2000s but by 2015 had gone out of business.

The company produced a range of paramotors, including the Discovery series. These were originally powered by the Radne Raket 120, but were under-powered and that powerplant was replaced by the Cors'Air M21Y and Per Il Volo Top 80 instead. The company's paramotor designs were noted for their four-part chassis that can split apart for transport.

The Airtime Explorer powered hang glider uses the two-stroke, single cylinder Radne Raket 120 of 14 hp (10 kW), and fitted with a 3.5:1 ratio reduction drive quite successfully.

== Aircraft ==
Summary of aircraft built by Airtime Products
Model name	First flight	Number built	Type
Airtime Discovery	mid-2000s		Paramotor
Airtime Explorer	mid-2000s		Powered hang glider
