= Oxford Area School District =

School district in Pennsylvania

Location
- Oxford, Pennsylvania; Chester County United States

District information
- Established: 1878
- Superintendent: David A. Woods

Other information
- Website: https://www.oxfordasd.org/

The Oxford Area School District is the K-12 public school district in Chester County, Pennsylvania.

The district includes Oxford, East Nottingham Township, Elk Township, Lower Oxford Township, Upper Oxford Township, and West Nottingham Township. Nottingham and Lincoln University are in the district boundary.

The district was established in 1952 through merging existing school districts. Area schools were already racially integrated at the time of the district's creation.

== Schools ==
- Jordan Bank Elementary School (Kindergarten)
- Elk Ridge Elementary School (Grades 1–2)
- Nottingham Elementary School (Grades 3–4)
- Hopewell Elementary School (Grades 5–6)
- Penn's Grove Middle School (Grades 7–8)
- Oxford Area High School (Grades 9–12)
