= Herrion =

Herrion is a surname. Notable people with the surname include:

- Atlas Herrion (born 1980), American football player
- Bill Herrion (born 1958), American basketball coach
- Thomas Herrion (1981–2005), American football player
- Tom Herrion (born 1967), American basketball coach

== See also ==
- Herriot
