= Spencer Herr =

American folk artist

Spencer Herr (born March 1974) is an American folk artist from Phoenix, Arizona. He currently lives in Asheville, North Carolina.

== Biography ==
=== Early life ===
Herr grew up in Phoenix, Arizona and attended Northern Arizona University. He spent his early twenties traveling and seeking adventure throughout the US west coast, Mexico, Australia, and Asia. At 26, he moved to Southwest Virginia where he met his wife, Kara. He lives and works in Asheville with his wife and two daughters.

=== Career ===
In 2006, Herr began to show his art publicly. He approached Betsey-Rose Weiss the next year with a CD of his works. Upon viewing Herr's paintings, Weiss decided that he would be the first artist she would choose to represent as the new owner of an Asheville gallery. Herr was exhibited at the 20th annual Outsider Art Fair in New York in January 2012. His work was represented at the Outsider Art Fair by Marcia Weber Art Objects, a gallery that sells a large number of his works to collectors worldwide.

== Themes and materials ==
Much of Herr's work is laden with spiritual allusions. His interest in religion can be seen in two of his older series based on Abraham's Covenant and the poetry of 13th century Persian mystic Rumi. His series working man's mystic addresses the relationship between ego death and the desire to connect with God. His use of layering expresses an interest in the perception of memory. Herr often sacrifices realism for essence. Paintings of his daughters are not portraits of their physical characteristics, but rather they capture the girls' wonderment and innocence. Having grown up in the southwest, Herr is fascinated with rough environments. His work represents this through journalistic portrayals of states of mind, as opposed to landscapes.
