= Twyla Baker =

American academic administrator (born 1976)

7th President of Nueta Hidatsa Sahnish College
- Incumbent
- Assumed office October 2014

Personal details
- Born: Twyla Beth Baker; October 4, 1976 (age 49) New Town, North Dakota, U.S.
- Party: Democratic
- Children: 7
- Education: University of North Dakota

Twyla Beth Baker (born October 4, 1976) is an American Indian (Hidatsa) academic administrator serving as the seventh president of Nueta Hidatsa Sahnish College since 2014. She was previously a Native health researcher focused on health statistics and elder abuse.

== Life ==
Baker was born on October 4, 1976 in New Town, North Dakota on the Fort Berthold Indian Reservation. She is an enrolled member of Mandan, Hidatsa, and Arikara Nation. Her parents spoke Hidatsa but Baker did not learn the language. She attended Nueta Hidatsa Sahnish College (NHS College). She earned a B.S. in environmental geology and technology (2002) and M.S. in education general studies (2005) from the University of North Dakota (UND).

From 2009 to 2013, Baker was the project director of the UND national resource center on Native American aging. In this role, Baker established a database based on surveys of Native elder health statistics on diabetes, suicide, and other health issues. She also worked in tribal data sovereignty and policy. During this time, she completed a Ph.D. in teaching and learning and research methodologies in 2013 from UND. Her dissertation was titled Mental health and social engagement among American Indian elders. Her doctoral advisor was Steven LeMire. The doctoral research led Baker to become the principal investigator of the National Indigenous Elder Justice Initiative.

In 2013, Baker returned to NHS College as the dean of students at the invitation of Alyce Spotted Bear who was working as the vice president of Indian studies. Six months later, she became its interim president. In October 2014, she was appointed the seventh president of NHS College.

In 2020, Baker alongside Prairie Rose Seminole and Ruth Buffalo formed a Native American caucus group within the North Dakota Democratic–Nonpartisan League Party.

Baker has seven children.
