= Oxford Area High School =

Location
- 705 Waterway Road; Oxford, (Chester County), Pennsylvania 19363; United States; 39.7723°N 75.9587°W

Information
- School type: Public, high school
- Motto: Proud Tradition, Bright Future
- Established: 1869; 157 years ago
- School district: Oxford Area School District
- Superintendent: David A. Woods
- Principal: James A. Canaday
- Teaching staff: 79.32 (FTE)
- Grades: 9-12
- Enrollment: 1,102 (2023–2024)
- Student to teacher ratio: 13.89
- Colors: Maroon and white
- Team name: Hornets
- Rival: Avon Grove
- Website: oahs.oxfordasd.org

Oxford Area High School (OAHS) is the only secondary school in the Oxford Area School District. It is in East Nottingham Township in Chester County, Pennsylvania, United States. It has an Oxford post office address.

The first high school in Oxford was established in 1869. The student body consists of about 1,200 students. The high school was and has been racially integrated, even though prior to the late 1940s area elementary schools had been racially segregated. In 1952 OASD was created through consolidating existing school districts.

Previously the school was in Oxford borough. It relocated to East Nottingham Township in 2005. The previous building, heavily renovated, is now the Penn's Grove Middle School.
