= Lower Oxford Township, Pennsylvania =

Township in Pennsylvania, US

Lower Oxford Township
- Township
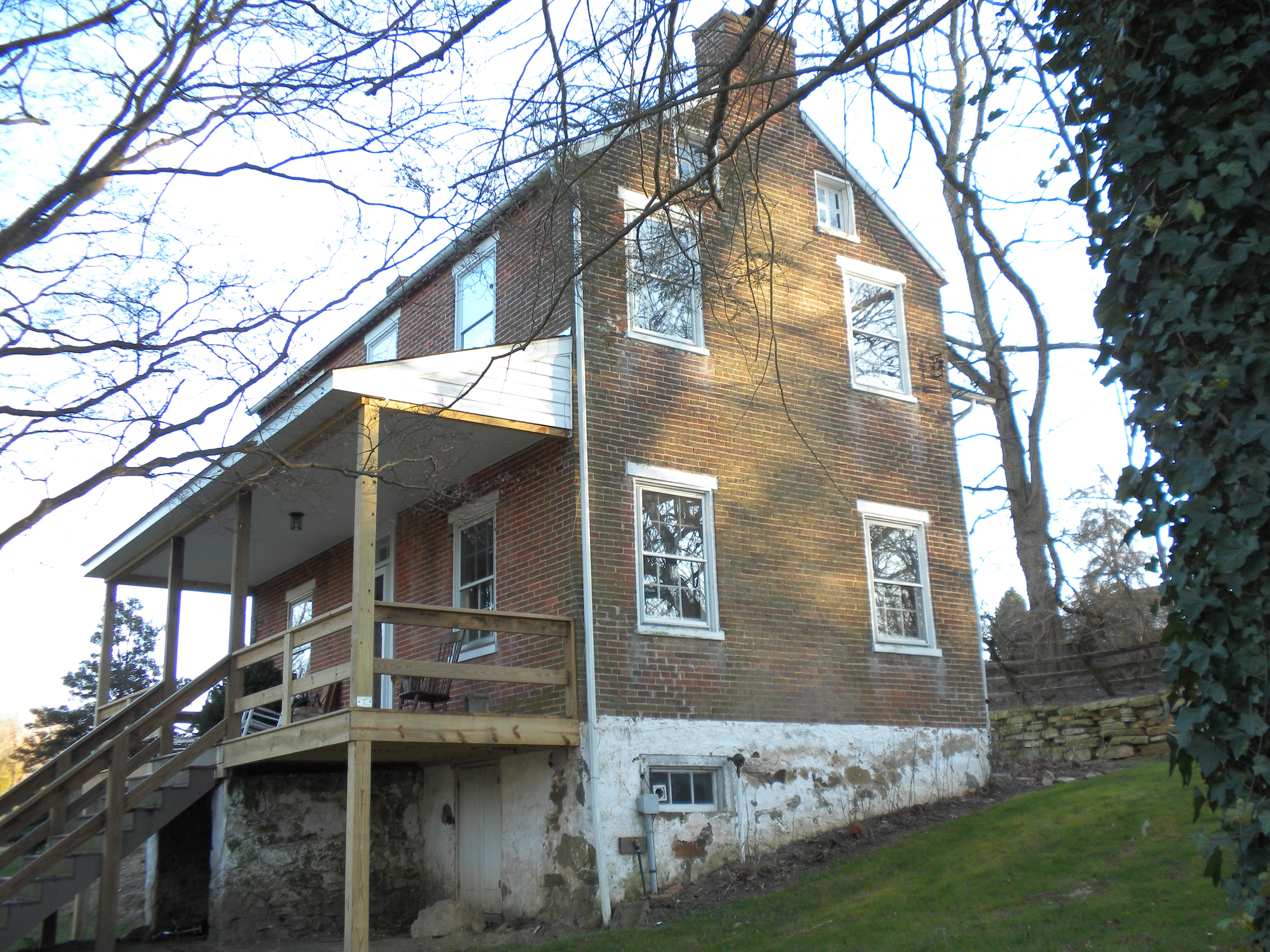
- Hopewell Historic District

- Location of Lower Oxford Township in Chester County, Pennsylvania (top) and of Chester County in Pennsylvania (below)

- Location of Pennsylvania in the United States
- Coordinates: 39°48′27″N 75°58′16″W
- Country: United States
- State: Pennsylvania
- County: Chester

Area
  - Total: 18.37 sq mi (47.59 km^{2})
  - Land: 17.99 sq mi (46.60 km^{2})
  - Water: 0.38 sq mi (0.99 km^{2})
- Elevation: 525 ft (160 m)

Population (2020)
  - Total: 5,420
  - Density: 301/sq mi (116/km^{2})
- Time zone: UTC-5 (EST)
  - Summer (DST): UTC-4 (EDT)
- Area code: 610
- FIPS code: 42-029-45040
- Website: loweroxfordtownship.org

Lower Oxford Township is a township in Chester County, Pennsylvania, United States. The population was 5,420 at the 2020 census. Lincoln University, a historically black university, is located in the township.

== History ==
The Hopewell Historic District and Pine Grove Covered Bridge are listed on the National Register of Historic Places. The township is named after Oxford, England.

The township was also acted as an early genesis point and catalyst for large Irish and especially Scotch-Irish settlement and expansion into Chester County and points west in Pennsylvania. Part of the township was originally disputed territory between Pennsylvania and Maryland, resolved eventually by the Mason–Dixon line. One third of the township formed part of the northern section of Susquehanna Manor later known as New Connaught, a large settlement tract established by Maryland and named after the western province of Connacht in Ireland that courted Irish settlement into the area. The township was also originally part of neighboring Londonderry Township, named after Londonderry, now in Northern Ireland, and settled by Irish (primarily Scotch-Irish) settlers entering Pennsylvania.

== Geography ==
According to the United States Census Bureau, the township has a total area of 18.5 square miles (48 km^{2}), of which 18.2 square miles (47 km^{2}) is land and 0.3 square miles (0.78 km^{2}), or 1.83%, is water.

== Demographics ==
Historical population
Census	Pop.	Note	%±
1930	1,127		—
1940	1,186		5.2%
1950	1,657		39.7%
1960	2,007		21.1%
1970	2,804		39.7%
1980	2,836		1.1%
1990	3,264		15.1%
2000	4,319		32.3%
2010	5,200		20.4%
2020	5,420		4.2%
2020

At the 2010 census, the township was 53.1% non-Hispanic White, 35.1% Black or African American, 0.3% Native American, 0.3% Asian, 0.1% Native Hawaiian or other Pacific Islander, and 2.3% were two or more races. 10.6% of the population were of Hispanic or Latino ancestry.

As of the census of 2000, there were 4,319 people, 986 households, and 799 families residing in the township. The population density was 237.2 inhabitants per square mile (91.6/km^{2}). There were 1,018 housing units at an average density of 55.9 per square mile (21.6/km^{2}). The racial makeup of the township was 61.31% White, 34.50% African American, 0.05% Native American, 0.25% Asian, 2.92% from other races, and 0.97% from two or more races. Hispanic or Latino of any race were 6.53% of the population.

There were 986 households, out of which 41.3% had children under the age of 18 living with them, 68.9% were married couples living together, 7.1% had a female householder with no husband present, and 18.9% were non-families. 15.0% of all households were made up of individuals, and 7.6% had someone living alone who was 65 years of age or older. The average household size was 3.04 and the average family size was 3.37.

In the township the population was spread out, with 22.3% under the age of 18, 34.1% from 18 to 24, 21.5% from 25 to 44, 14.6% from 45 to 64, and 7.5% who were 65 years of age or older. The median age was 22 years. For every 100 females there were 92.9 males. For every 100 females age 18 and over, there were 88.5 males.

The median income for a household in the township was $49,766, and the median income for a family was $51,809. Males had a median income of $39,205 versus $25,521 for females. The per capita income for the township was $15,475. About 6.3% of families and 10.4% of the population were below the poverty line, including 12.5% of those under age 18 and 7.6% of those age 65 or over.

== Transportation ==
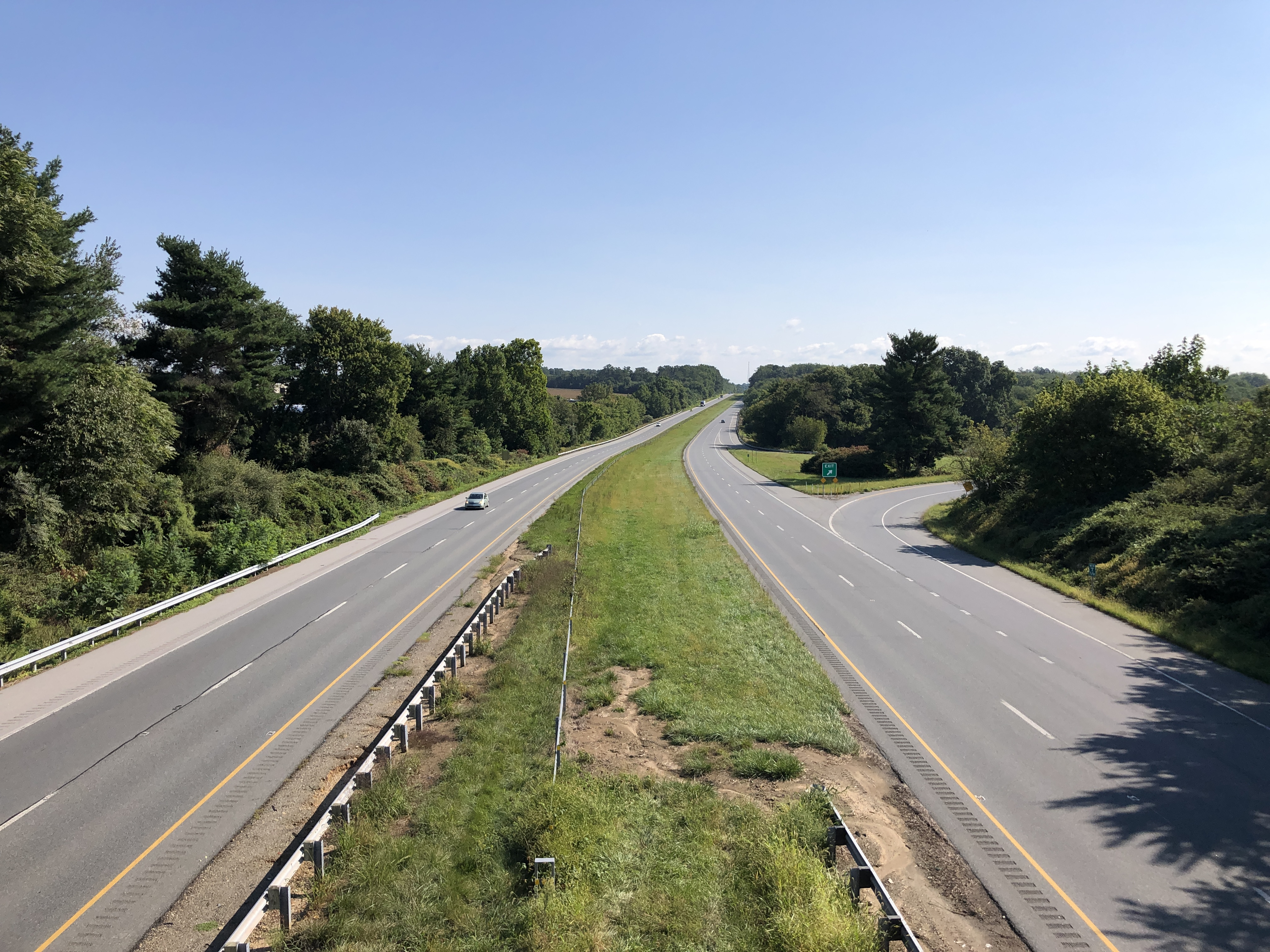
US 1 northbound in Lower Oxford Township

As of 2022, there were 60.41 miles (97.22 km) of public roads in Lower Oxford Township, of which 23.90 miles (38.46 km) were maintained by the Pennsylvania Department of Transportation (PennDOT) and 36.51 miles (58.76 km) were maintained by the township.

U.S. Route 1 is the most prominent highway serving Lower Oxford Township. It follows the Kennett Oxford Bypass along a southwest-northeast alignment through the central and eastern portions of the township. Pennsylvania Route 10 follows Limestone Road along a north-south alignment through the central portion of the township. Pennsylvania Route 472 follows Lancaster Pike along a northwest-southeast alignment across the southwestern portion of the township.

== Education ==
It is in the Oxford Area School District.

The majority of the territory of Lincoln University is in the township.
