= Herr's =

Brand of snack food

Herr Foods Inc.
- Type: Private
- Industry: Snack foods
- Founded: 1946; 80 years ago
- Founder: Jim Herr
- Headquarters: Nottingham, Pennsylvania, U.S.
- Area served: Eastern United States and Eastern Canada
- Key people: Troy Gunden (president & CEO); Ed Herr (executive chairman); J. M. Herr (executive chairman, retired)
- Website: herrs.com

Herr's (/ˈhɜːrz/ HURZ) is an American brand of potato chips and other snack foods produced and marketed by Herr Foods Inc. based in Nottingham, Pennsylvania. Their products are sold in all 50 American states and in over 40 countries.

== History ==
In 1946, Jim Herr, then 21 years old, purchased a small potato chip company in Lancaster, Pennsylvania. Initial sales averaged approximately $30 a week (equivalent to $495 in 2025).

In 1958, the company introduced flavored potato chips and in 1974, switched to foil packaging from the traditional glassine bags. In the 1970s and 1980s there was a growth in the snack food industry which prompted an expansion in the variety of products being manufactured including corn chips, tortilla chips, and pretzels. The Herr Angus Farm, a cattle farm which made use of potato waste products, was added in the 1980s.

Herr began transferring control of the company to his sons, Ed Herr and J. M. Herr, in the 1990s. Ed took over as company spokesman. Jim retired as company chair in favor of J. M. Herr in January 2005, but remained on the board of directors.

Jim Herr died on April 5, 2012. Ed Herr and J. M. Herr assumed the roles of president and executive chairman respectively. As of December 2025, J. M. had retired and transferred the role of executive chairman to Ed. Ed's former role of president and CEO was transferred to his nephew, Troy Gunden.

== Products ==
Herr's produces a wide variety of snack foods including potato chips, pretzels, tortilla chips, cheese curls, popcorn, and onion rings. They produce, as of July 2016, 37 different potato chip varieties with an emphasis on strong and spicy flavors. Among their offerings are Ragin Ranch, Buffalo Blue Cheese, Old Bay, Horseradish, Baby Back Ribs, Kansas City Steak, Hot Sauce, and Jalapeño in addition to more traditional varieties such as Barbecue, Kettle Cooked, Sour Cream & Onion, Cheddar & Sour Cream, Salt & Pepper, Ketchup, Habanero and Creamy Ranch, and Salt & Vinegar.

In February 2016, Herr's released a Crab Fries flavor in partnership with the restaurant chain Chickie's & Pete's. They also released a line in partnership with Stubb's Bar-B-Q.

Herr's potato chips are sold in distinctive foil packaging.

== In popular culture ==
A subplot of an episode of The Office features Jim Halpert and Karen Filippelli spending an entire workday searching for a package of Herr's salt and vinegar chips. In a DVD exclusive for season 3, Kevin Malone makes a quesadilla out of Herr's Sour Cream & Onion chips and spray cheese.

== Visitors' center ==
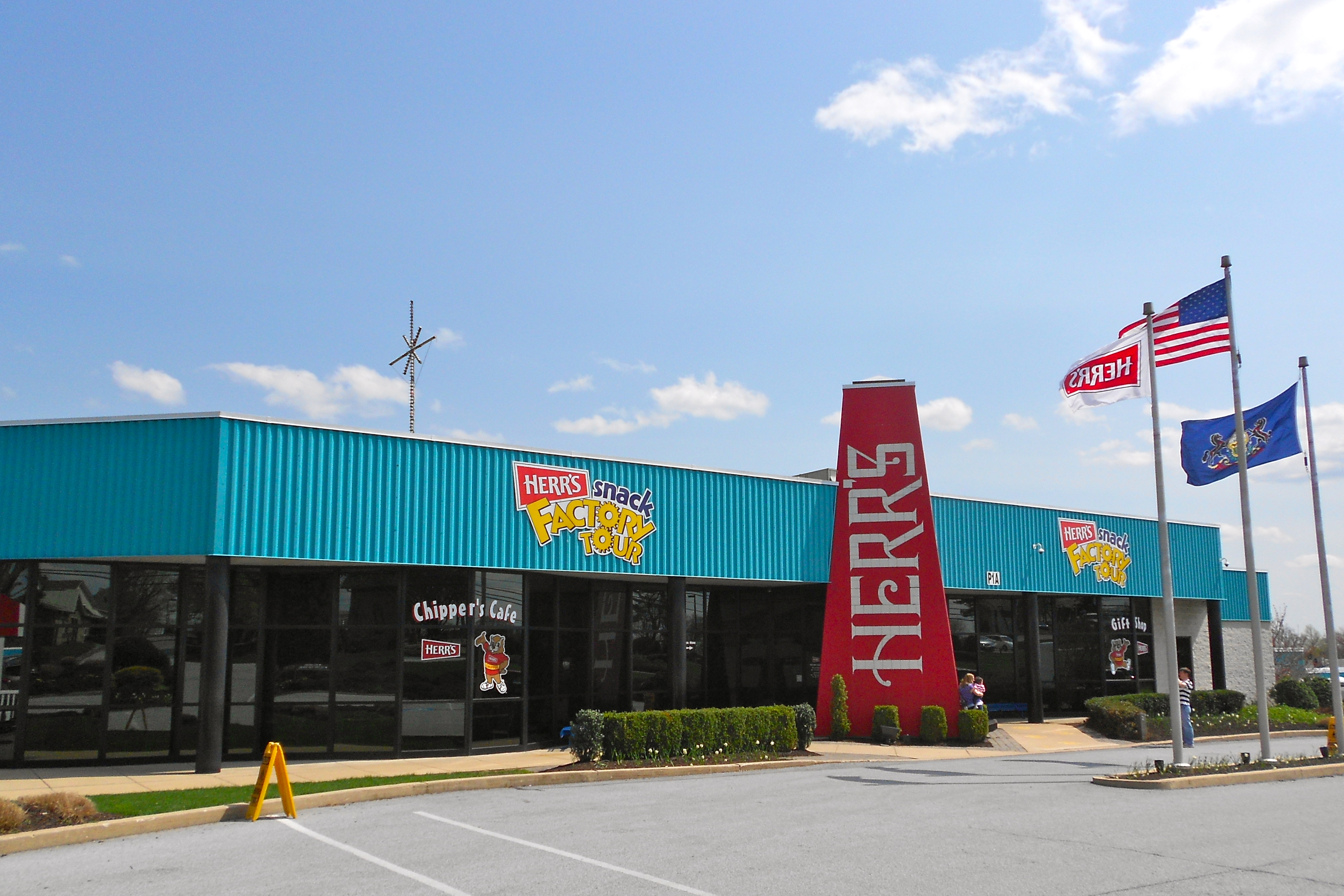
Visitors' center in Nottingham, Pennsylvania

The Herr's Visitors' Center was built in 1989 and is adjacent to the company's main plant. Tour guides lead visitors through both the visitors' center and the plant. The tours last approximately one hour.
