= Twila Herr =

American-born Australian librarian and educator (1946-2007)

- Born: Twila Ann Janssen; 9 December 1946; Columbus, Nebraska
- Died: 10 January 2007 (aged 60); Hobart, Australia
- Education: University of Nebraska–Lincoln; University of Tasmania
- Occupations: Educator, librarian

Twila Ann Janssen Herr (9 December 1946 – 10 January 2007) was an American-born Australian librarian and educator.

== Biography ==
The daughter of Edgar Janssen and Arlene Romberg, she was born Twila Ann Janssen in Columbus, Nebraska and attended Columbus High School. She received a BEd from the University of Nebraska–Lincoln in 1969 and a MEd from the University of Tasmania in 1984. Later in 1984, she received a certificate in Advanced Library Information Studies from the University of Hawaii. Herr also held a Nebraska teacher's certificate and, in 1973, earned a graduate diploma in librarianship from the Canberra College of Advanced Education.

Herr worked as a library assistant at the University of Nebraska until 1969, when she began working as a research circulation assistant at the Duke University Law Library. She subsequently worked as a serials cataloguer at the Menzies Library at the Australian National University and as a serials cataloguer and then readers' advisor at the Tasmanian College of Advanced Education as well as a part-time librarian at a residential college at the University of Tasmania. In 1973, she became a lecturer on library science at the Tasmanian College of Advanced Education. Her areas of interest included providing library services to children, the aged, people with reduced vision and users with special needs as well as cataloguing.

In 1967, she married Richard Herr; the couple had a son Janssen.

In 1973, she became an associate of the Australian Library and Information Association. She served in various roles in the Tasmanian branch of the Association, including president, vice-president and treasurer and also was a member of committees at the national level. In 1992, she was named a fellow of the Association. She also held a number of positions in the Australian Council of Libraries and Information Services, including membership on the national council.

Herr died in Hobart from multiple sclerosis at the age of 60.

A biennial award was established in her name to encourage projects in support of library services for the disabled.
