= Nottingham, Pennsylvania =

Unincorporated community in Pennsylvania, US

- Census-designated place
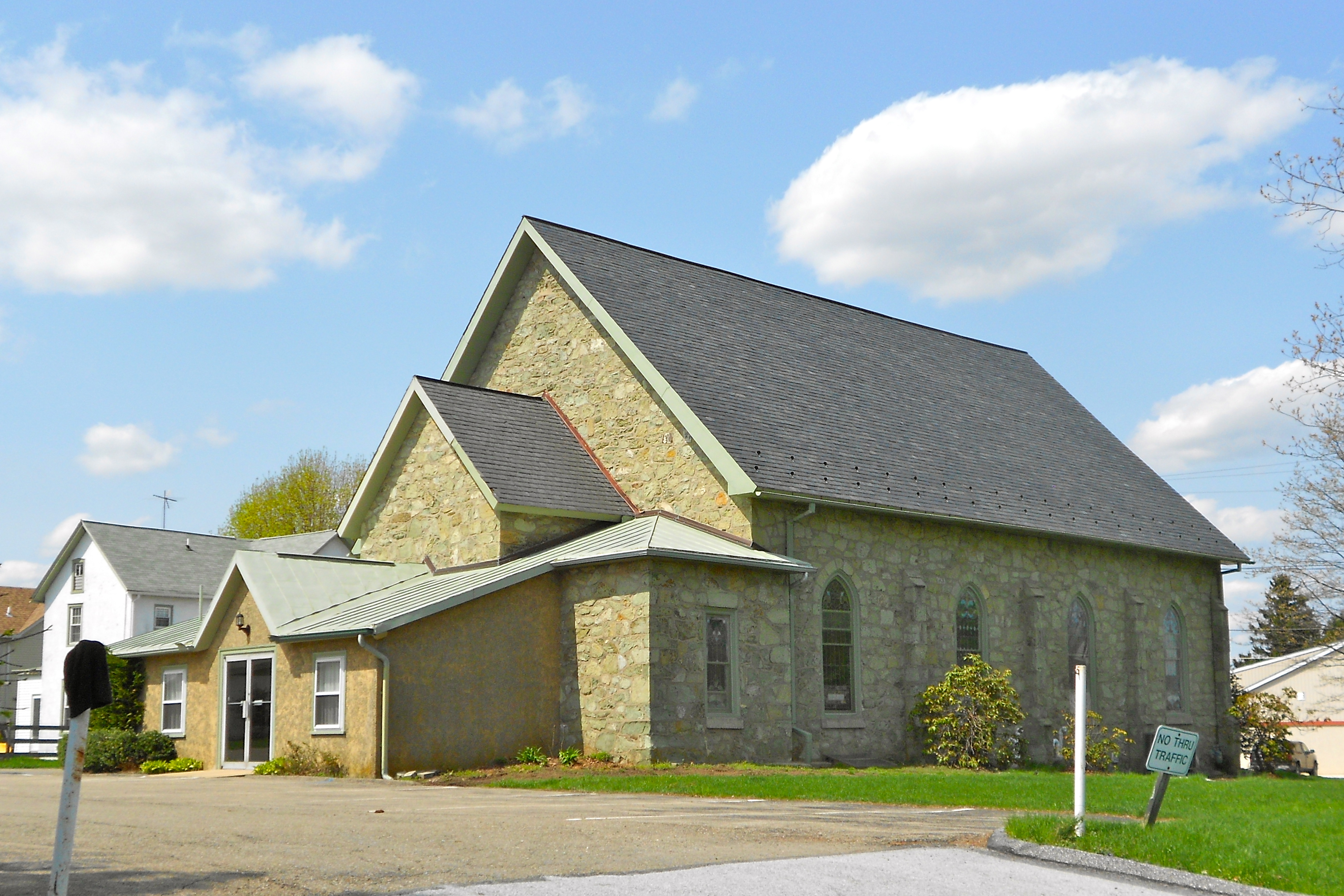
- Nottingham Presbyterian Church

- Location of Nottingham in Chester County, Pennsylvania (left) and of Chester County in Pennsylvania (right)

- Location within the U.S. state of Pennsylvania Nottingham (the United States)
- Coordinates: 39°44′55″N 76°1′7″W
- Country: United States
- State: Pennsylvania
- County: Chester
- Township: East Nottingham, West Nottingham

Area
  - Total: 3.25 sq mi (8.42 km^{2})
  - Land: 3.24 sq mi (8.38 km^{2})
  - Water: 0.012 sq mi (0.03 km^{2})

Population (2020)
  - Total: 1,260
  - Density: 389.2/sq mi (150.28/km^{2})
- Time zone: UTC-5 (Eastern (EST))
  - Summer (DST): UTC-4 (EDT)
- ZIP code: 19362
- Area codes: 610 and 484
- FIPS code: 42-55704

Nottingham is an unincorporated community and census-designated place that is located in Chester County, Pennsylvania, United States. The CDP is divided between East Nottingham Township and West Nottingham Township.

== History and notable features ==
It is home to the 651-acre Nottingham County Park, a serpentine barrens that is listed as a National Natural Landmark.

A Herr's plant, which was founded in 1946, is also located in the community.

The U.S. Post Office for Nottingham is located on Baltimore Pike.

== Geography ==
The center of the community is located at the intersection of U.S. 1 and Pennsylvania Route 272, near the border with East Nottingham Township and a short distance north of the Maryland border.

== Demographics ==
As of 2020, this CDP had a population of 1,260.

Historical population
Census	Pop.	Note	%±
2020	1,260		—
U.S. Decennial Census

== Education ==
It is in the Oxford Area School District.
