= West Nottingham Township, Pennsylvania =

Township in Pennsylvania, US

West Nottingham Township
- Township
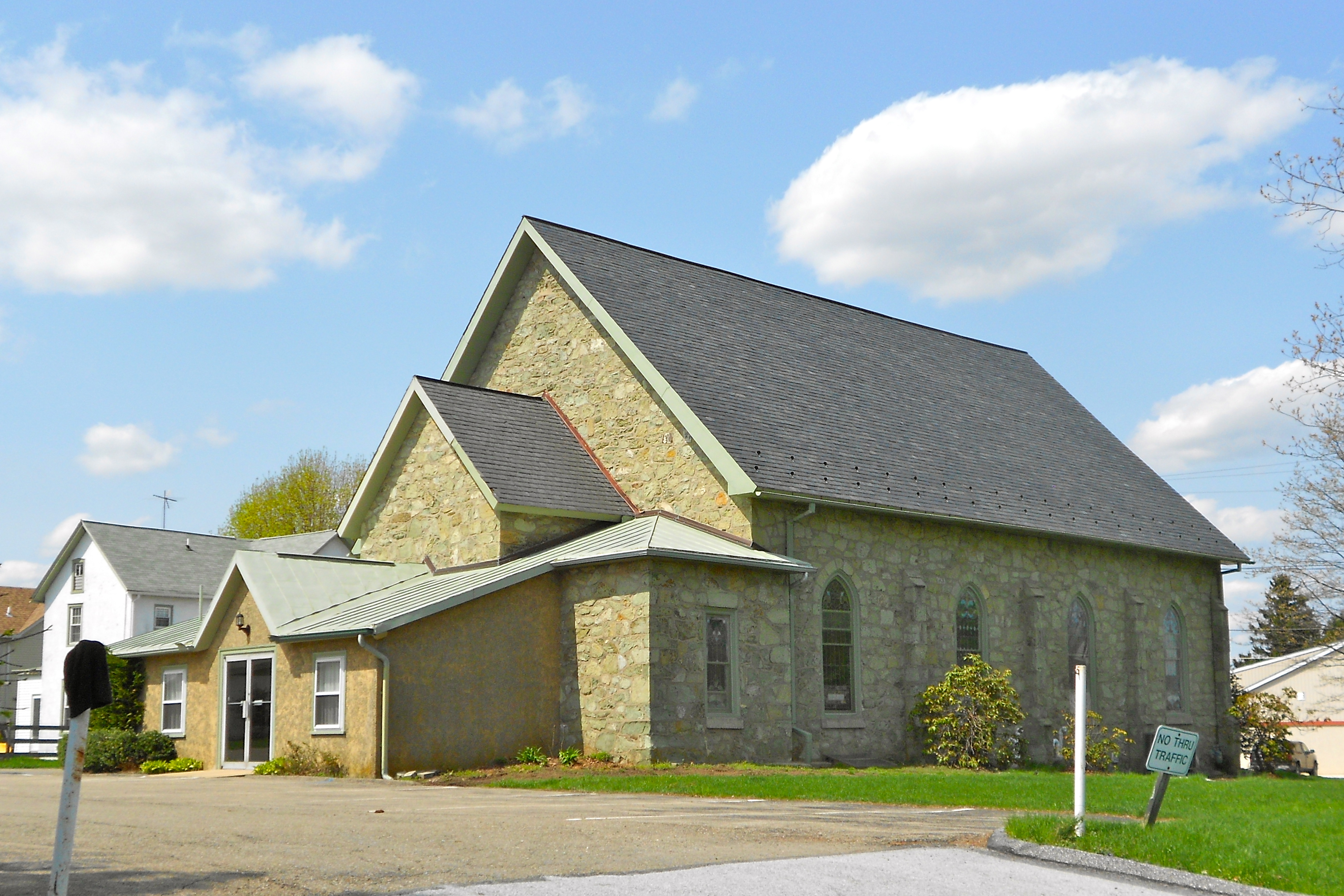
- Nottingham Presbyterian Church

- Location of West Nottingham Township in Chester County and the state of Pennsylvania

- Location of Pennsylvania in the United States
- Coordinates: 39°44′56″N 75°59′44″W
- Country: United States
- State: Pennsylvania
- County: Chester

Area
  - Total: 14.13 sq mi (36.60 km^{2})
  - Land: 13.96 sq mi (36.15 km^{2})
  - Water: 0.17 sq mi (0.45 km^{2})
- Elevation: 492 ft (150 m)

Population (2010)
  - Total: 2,722
  - Estimate (2016): 2,685
  - Density: 192.4/sq mi (74.27/km^{2})
- Time zone: UTC-5 (EST)
  - Summer (DST): UTC-4 (EDT)
- Area code: 610
- FIPS code: 42-029-83712

West Nottingham Township is a township in Chester County, Pennsylvania, United States. The population was 2,722 at the 2010 census.

== History ==
The township was originally disputed territory between Pennsylvania and Maryland, resolved eventually by the Mason–Dixon line. Established in 1718, West Nottingham Township dates back to 1701 when a group of William Penn's followers settled in the Nottingham Area. It is named after Nottinghamshire, England. The township also formed part of the northern section of Susquehanna Manor later known as New Connaught, a large settlement tract established by Maryland and named after the western province of Connacht in Ireland that courted Irish settlement into the area. The dispute led to heavy Quaker and Scotch-Irish settlement of the area.

== Geography ==
According to the United States Census Bureau, the township has a total area of 13.9 square miles (36 km^{2}), of which 0.04 square miles (0.10 km^{2}), or 0.29%, is water. It contains the census-designated place of Nottingham.

== Demographics ==
Historical population
Census	Pop.	Note	%±
1930	547		—
1940	685		25.2%
1950	881		28.6%
1960	1,137		29.1%
1970	1,440		26.6%
1980	2,030		41.0%
1990	2,183		7.5%
2000	2,634		20.7%
2010	2,722		3.3%
2020	2,764		1.5%

At the 2010 census, the township was 88.0% non-Hispanic White, 2.0% Black or African American, 0.6% Native American, 0.3% Asian, and 2.0% were two or more races. 8.3% of the population were of Hispanic or Latino ancestry.

At the 2000 census there were 2,634 people, 956 households, and 741 families living in the township. The population density was 189.9 inhabitants per square mile (73.3/km^{2}). There were 1,007 housing units at an average density of 72.6 per square mile (28.0/km^{2}). The racial makeup of the township was 94.68% White, 1.94% African American, 0.38% Native American, 0.27% Asian, 1.67% from other races, and 1.06% from two or more races. Hispanic or Latino of any race were 4.18%.

There were 956 households, 38.7% had children under the age of 18 living with them, 57.6% were married couples living together, 13.0% had a female householder with no husband present, and 22.4% were non-families. 18.2% of households were made up of individuals, and 7.3% were one person aged 65 or older. The average household size was 2.75 and the average family size was 3.07.

The age distribution was 28.0% under the age of 18, 8.0% from 18 to 24, 30.5% from 25 to 44, 23.4% from 45 to 64, and 10.1% 65 or older. The median age was 35 years. For every 100 females, there were 100.0 males. For every 100 females age 18 and over, there were 98.0 males.

The median household income was $45,142 and the median family income was $49,630. Males had a median income of $33,450 versus $23,406 for females. The per capita income for the township was $17,975. About 3.3% of families and 5.0% of the population were below the poverty line, including 2.3% of those under age 18 and 20.2% of those age 65 or over.

West Nottingham is home to Nottingham County Park. The 651-acre park sits atop an out-cropping of serpentine stone greater than one square mile in size – one of the largest serpentine barrens on the East Coast.

West Nottingham is also home to several mobile home communities.

== Transportation ==
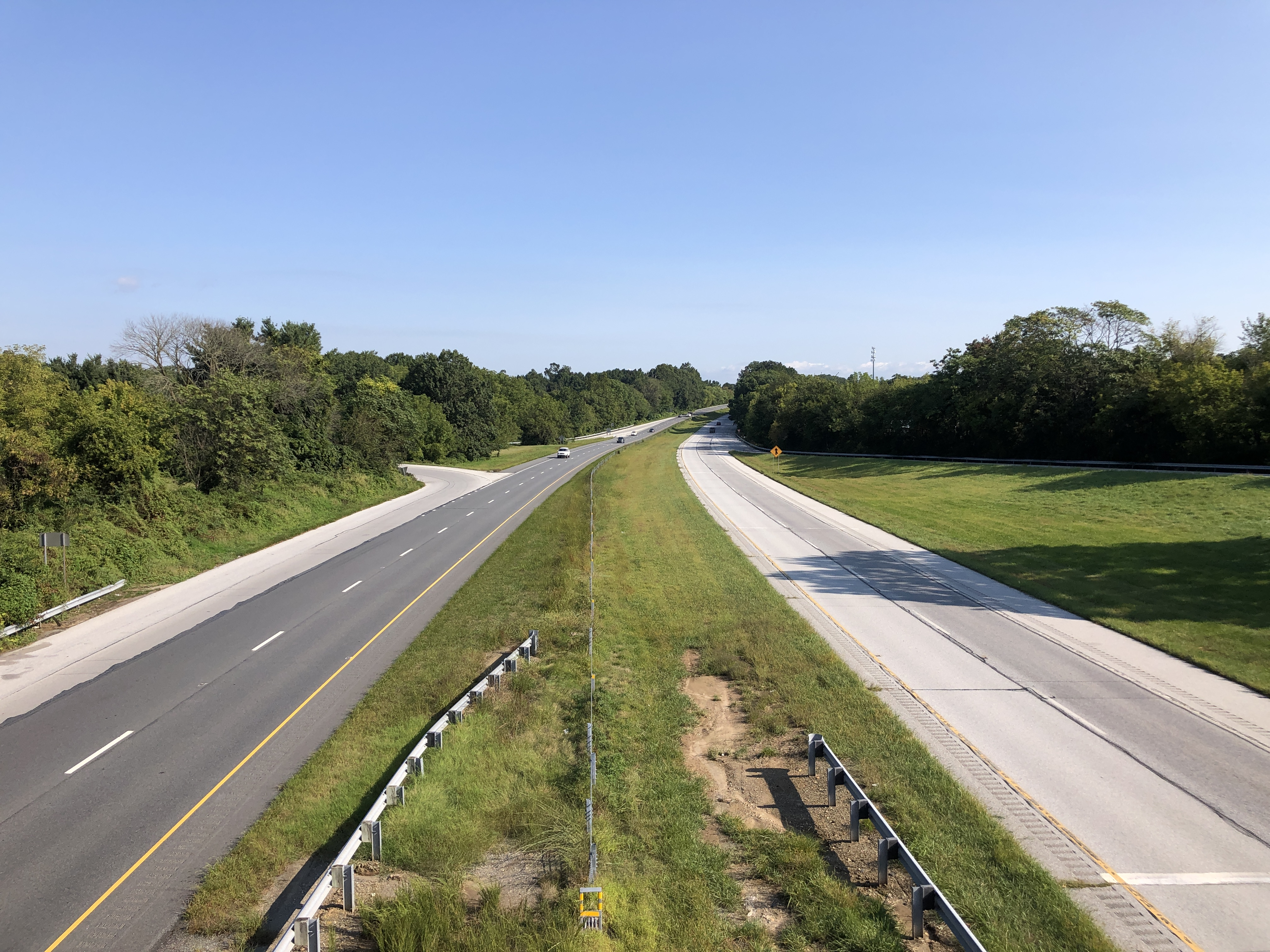
US 1 northbound in West Nottingham Township

As of 2009, there were 36.40 miles (58.58 km) of public roads in West Nottingham Township, of which 7.35 miles (11.83 km) were maintained by the Pennsylvania Department of Transportation (PennDOT) and 29.05 miles (46.75 km) were maintained by the township.

U.S. Route 1 is the main highway serving West Nottingham Township. It follows a north–south alignment along the Baltimore Pike and Kennett-Oxford Bypass across the eastern portion of the township. Pennsylvania Route 272 is the only other numbered road serving the township. It follows Christine Road along a northwest–southeast alignment across the northeastern portion of the township.

== Education ==
It is in the Oxford Area School District.
