= East Nottingham Township, Pennsylvania =

Township in Pennsylvania, US

East Nottingham Township
- Township
- Location of East Nottingham in Chester County and Pennsylvania

- Location of Pennsylvania in the United States
- Coordinates: 39°44′00″N 75°58′59″W
- Country: United States
- State: Pennsylvania
- County: Chester

Area
  - Total: 20.14 sq mi (52.17 km^{2})
  - Land: 20.03 sq mi (51.87 km^{2})
  - Water: 0.12 sq mi (0.31 km^{2})
- Elevation: 499 ft (152 m)

Population (2020)
  - Total: 8,650
  - Density: 432/sq mi (167/km^{2})
- Time zone: UTC-5 (EST)
  - Summer (DST): UTC-4 (EDT)
- Area code: 610
- FIPS code: 42-029-21624
- Website: www.eastnottingham.org

East Nottingham Township is a township in Chester County, Pennsylvania, United States. The population was 8,650 at the 2020 census.

== History ==
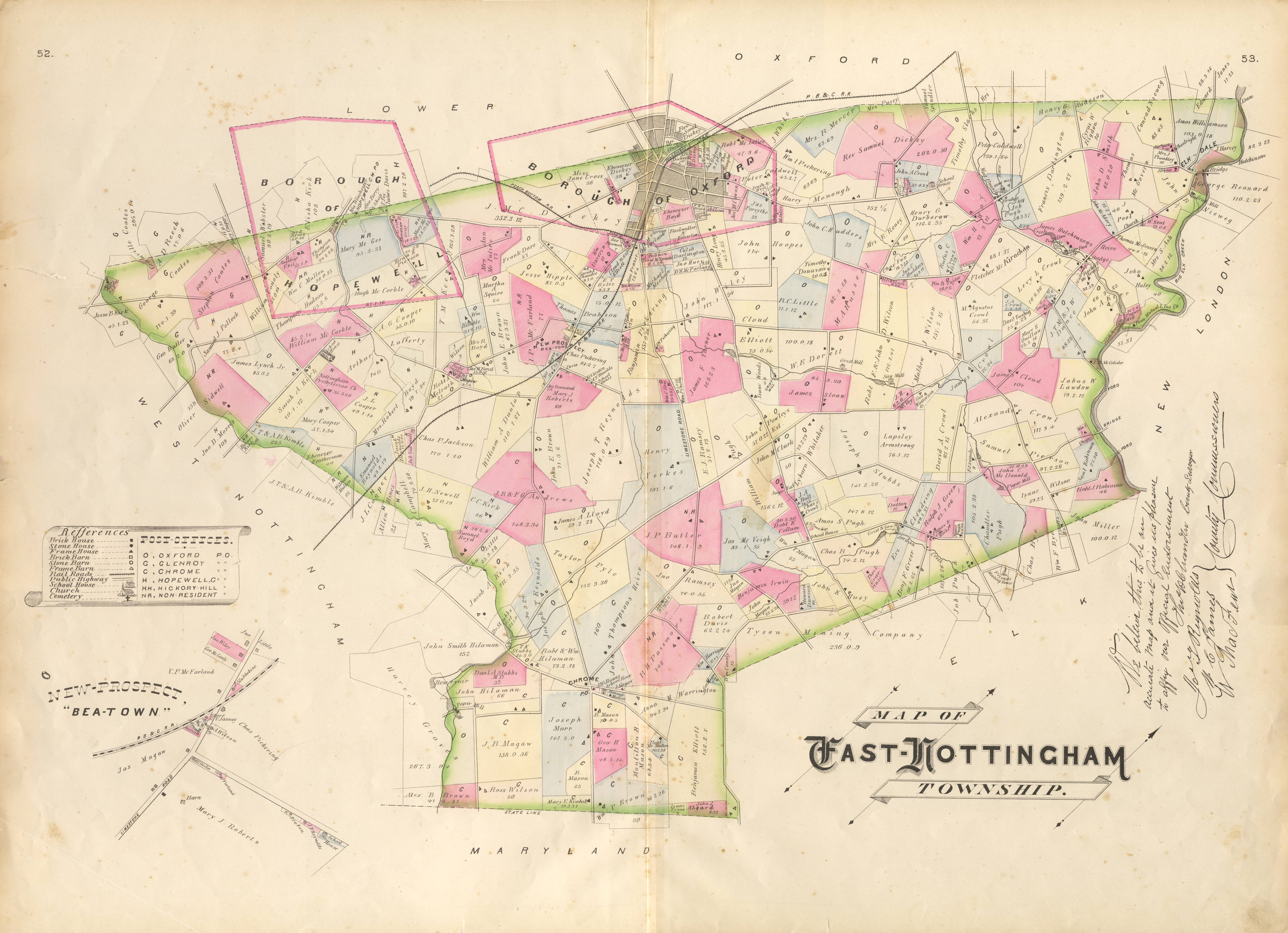
An 1883 map of East Nottingham Township from Breou's Farm Atlas

The township is named after Nottinghamshire, England. The township was originally disputed territory between Pennsylvania and Maryland, which was resolved with the development of the Mason–Dixon line.

Half of the current township formed part of the northern section of Susquehanna Manor, a large settlement tract as part of Maryland belonging to George Talbot, nephew of Lord Baltimore, which he later named New Connaught after the western province of Connacht in Ireland that courted Irish settlement into the area. The dispute led to heavy Quaker and Scotch-Irish settlement of the area.

The Hopewell Historic District is listed on the National Register of Historic Places.

== Geography ==
According to the U.S. Census Bureau, the township has a total area of 20.1 square miles (52 km^{2}), of which 20.0 square miles (52 km^{2}) is land and 0.04 square miles (0.10 km^{2}), or 0.10%, is water.

== Demographics ==
=== 2020 census ===
As of the 2020 United States census, there were 8,985 people.

=== 2010 census ===
At the 2010 census, the township was 86.0% non-Hispanic White, 3.1% Black or African American, 0.4% Asian, and 2.0% were two or more races. 9.2% of the population were of Hispanic or Latino ancestry.

As of the 2000 census, there were 5,516 people, 1,759 households, and 1,442 families living in the township. The population density was 275.3 inhabitants per square mile (106.3/km^{2}). There were 1,837 housing units at an average density of 91.7 per square mile (35.4/km^{2}). The racial makeup of the township was 92.97% White, 2.94% African American, 0.25% Native American, 0.24% Asian, 2.32% from other races, and 1.29% from two or more races. Hispanic or Latino of any race were 5.29% of the population.

Historical population
Census	Pop.	Note	%±
1930	1,339		—
1940	1,576		17.7%
1950	1,748		10.9%
1960	2,298		31.5%
1970	2,402		4.5%
1980	3,111		29.5%
1990	3,841		23.5%
2000	5,516		43.6%
2010	8,650		56.8%
2020	8,982		3.8%

There were 1,759 households, out of which 44.3% had children under the age of 18 living with them, 70.6% were married couples living together, 7.0% had a female householder with no husband present, and 18.0% were non-families. 12.7% of all households were made up of individuals, and 4.7% had someone living alone who was 65 years of age or older. The average household size was 3.13 and the average family size was 3.41.

In the township, the population was spread out, with 32.6% under the age of 18, 7.0% from 18 to 24, 33.3% from 25 to 44, 19.9% from 45 to 64, and 7.3% who were 65 years of age or older. The median age was 32 years. For every 100 females there were 107.3 males. For every 100 females age 18 and over, there were 103.4 males.

The median income for a household in the township was $53,864, and the median income for a family was $57,904. Males had a median income of $39,920 versus $31,731 for females. The per capita income for the township was $19,710. About 4.4% of families and 8.7% of the population were below the poverty line, including 13.6% of those under age 18 and none of those age 65 or over.

== Transportation ==
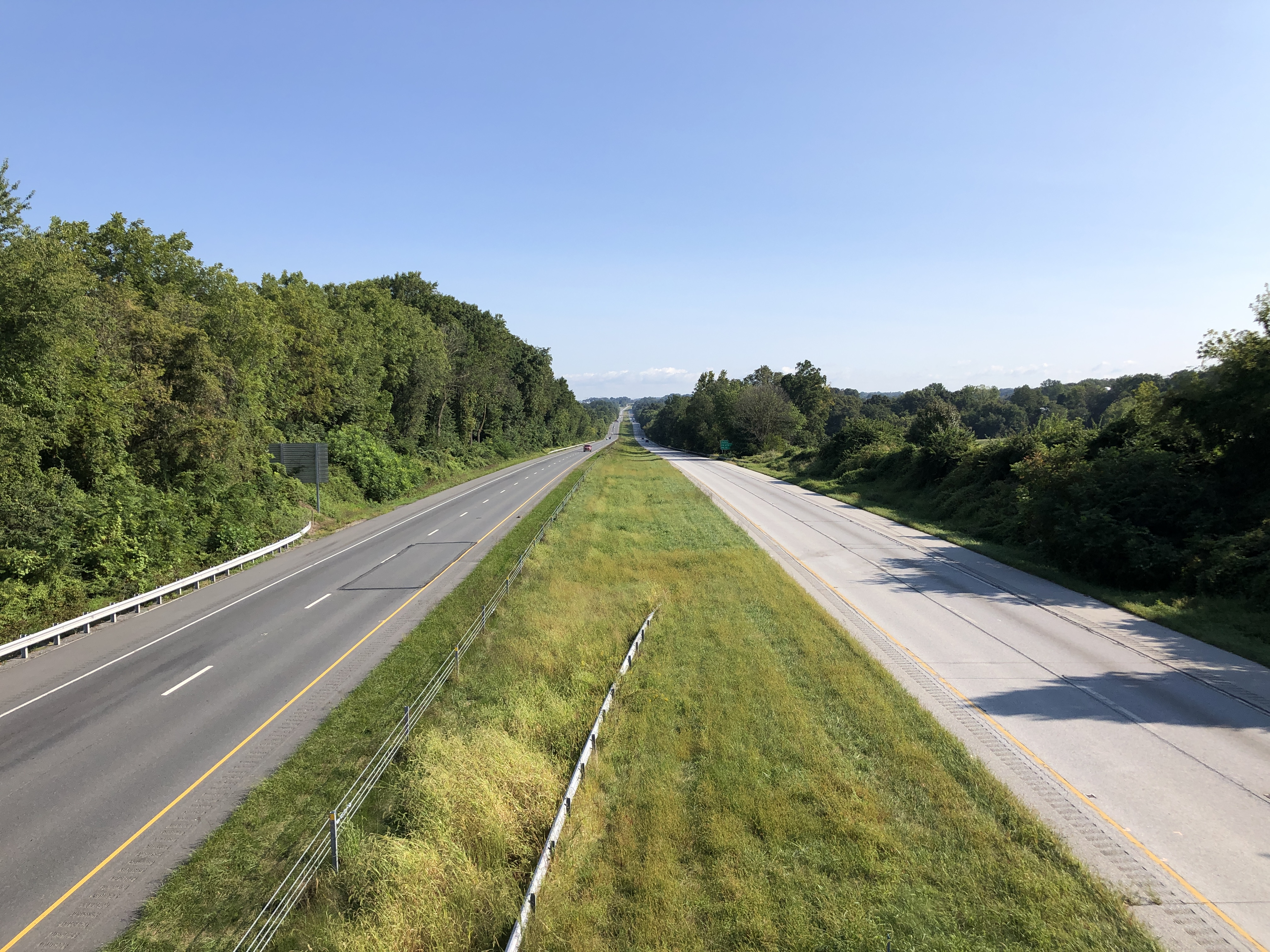
US Route 1 northbound in East Nottingham Township

As of 2022, there were 88.09 miles (141.77 km) of public roads in East Nottingham Township, of which 28.22 miles (45.42 km) were maintained by the Pennsylvania Department of Transportation (PennDOT) and 59.87 miles (96.35 km) were maintained by the township.

U.S. Route 1 is the most prominent highway serving East Nottingham Township. It follows the Kennett-Oxford Bypass along a northeast-southwest alignment through the western portion of the township. Pennsylvania Route 272 follows Chrome Road and Christine Road along a southeast-northwest alignment through the southern portion of the township. Finally, Pennsylvania Route 472 follows Hickory Hill Road along a northwest-southeast alignment through the northeastern portion of the township.

== Education ==
It is in the Oxford Area School District.

Oxford Area High School has been in the township since 2005.
