= Chesterville, Pennsylvania =

Unincorporated community in Pennsylvania, US

- Unincorporated community
- Location within Pennsylvania Location within the United States
- Coordinates: 39°46′40″N 75°48′39″W
- Country: United States
- State: Pennsylvania
- County: Chester
- Township: Franklin
- Elevation: 410 ft (120 m)
- Time zone: UTC-5 (Eastern (EST))
  - Summer (DST): UTC-4 (EDT)
- Area codes: 610 and 484
- GNIS feature ID: 1203263

Chesterville is an unincorporated community in Franklin Township in Chester County, Pennsylvania, United States. Chesterville is located at the intersection of Pennsylvania Route 841, Chesterville Road, and North Creek Road.
