= Lewisville, Pennsylvania =

Lewisville can refer to the following places in Pennsylvania:

- Lewisville, Chester County, Pennsylvania
- Lewisville, Indiana County, Pennsylvania
- The former name of Ulysses, Pennsylvania
