= Robert Mearns =

United States Army general

Robert Walter Mearns
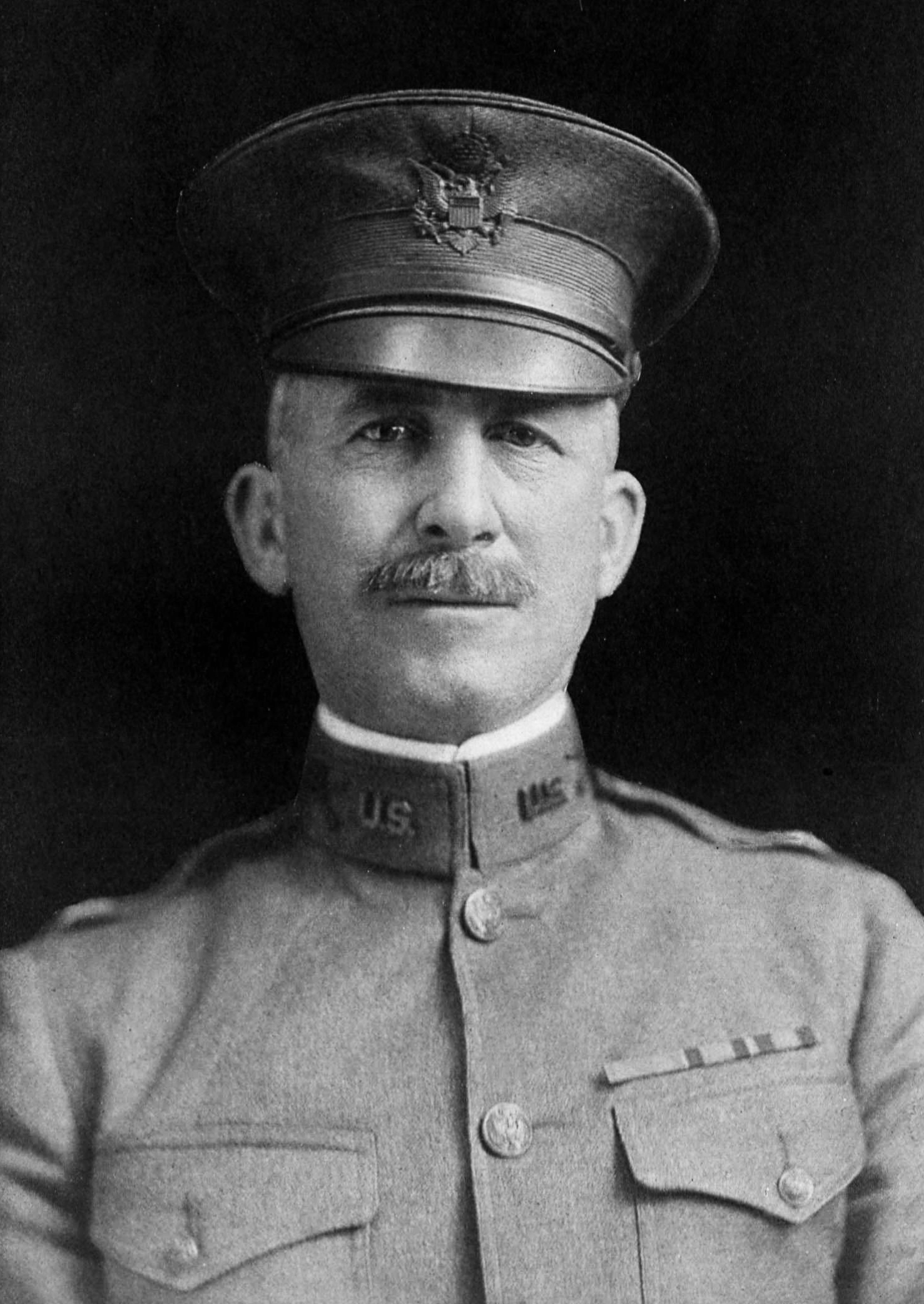
- Born: July 16, 1866; Kemblesville, Pennsylvania
- Died: May 23, 1949 (aged 82); San Francisco, California
- Relatives: LTG Fillmore K. Mearns (son)
- Military career
- Allegiance: United States
- Branch: United States Army
- Service years: 1892–1922
- Rank: Brigadier General
- Service number: 0-415
- Conflicts: Spanish–American War; Philippine–American War; World War I
- Awards: Silver Star

Brigadier General Robert Walter Mearns (July 16, 1866 – May 23, 1949) was a U.S. Army general during World War I.

== Early life and education ==
Robert Walter Mearns was born on July 16, 1866, in Kemblesville, Pennsylvania, to Andrew James Mearns, a farmer, and Martha Kennedy Mearns. He attended the West Chester Normal School, then entered the United States Military Academy and graduated number sixty-one of sixty-two in the class of 1892, one of thirteen who took five years to complete the requirements. Mearns later graduated from the Infantry and Cavalry School in 1897.

== Military career ==
He was commissioned in the 20th Infantry on duty at Fort Assinniboine, Montana, and later, at Fort Leavenworth, Kansas.

During the Spanish–American War, his regiment was sent to Cuba. Mearns participated in the Battle of El Caney and earned the Silver Star. After the war, his regiment was sent to the Philippines.

Mearns was promoted to major and commanded the Philippine Scouts from February 28, 1905, to December 8, 1909.

Mearns was promoted to lieutenant colonel effective May 15, 1917. During World War I, he received a temporary promotion to colonel on August 16, 1917, and to brigadier general on October 12, 1918. From November 1, 1918, to February 5, 1919, he served as commanding general of the 17th Infantry Division at Camp Beauregard in Louisiana.

After the war, Mearns reverted to his permanent rank of lieutenant colonel on February 6, 1919. He was promoted to colonel effective July 1, 1920 and retired from active duty on December 31, 1922. On June 21, 1930, Mearns was advanced to brigadier general on the retired list.

== Personal life ==
Mearns married Ethel Janet Brown on June 5, 1913. Together they had three sons, Robert, Fillmore and James. He was a Presbyterian and enjoyed riding horses, golfing and motoring.

Mearns and his wife settled in Berkeley, California after his retirement. He died at the age of eight-two at Letterman General Hospital in San Francisco on May 23, 1949. Mearns was buried at San Francisco National Cemetery.
