= Fillmore K. Mearns =

United States Army general

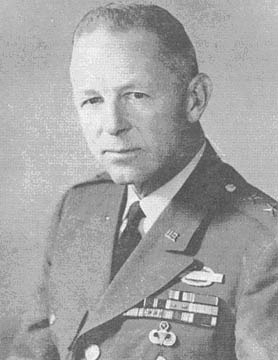
- Born: September 20, 1915; Utah, U.S.
- Died: November 18, 1997 (aged 82); South Carolina, U.S.
- Relatives: BG Robert W. Mearns (father)
- Military career
- Allegiance: United States of America
- Branch: United States Army
- Service years: 1938–1973
- Rank: Lieutenant General
- Nickname: Bud
- Commands: VII Corps; 25th Infantry Division; 77th Artillery Group; 75th Artillery Battalion, 17th Artillery Group; 3rd Battalion, 135th Infantry Regiment
- Conflicts: World War II; Vietnam War
- Awards: Silver Star; Defense Superior Service Medal; Legion of Merit; Bronze Star Medal; Purple Heart (3)

Fillmore Kennady "Ken" Mearns (September 20, 1915 – November 18, 1997) was a United States Army lieutenant general who served as commander of the 25th Infantry Division during the Vietnam War and later as commander of VII Corps in West Germany.

== Early life ==
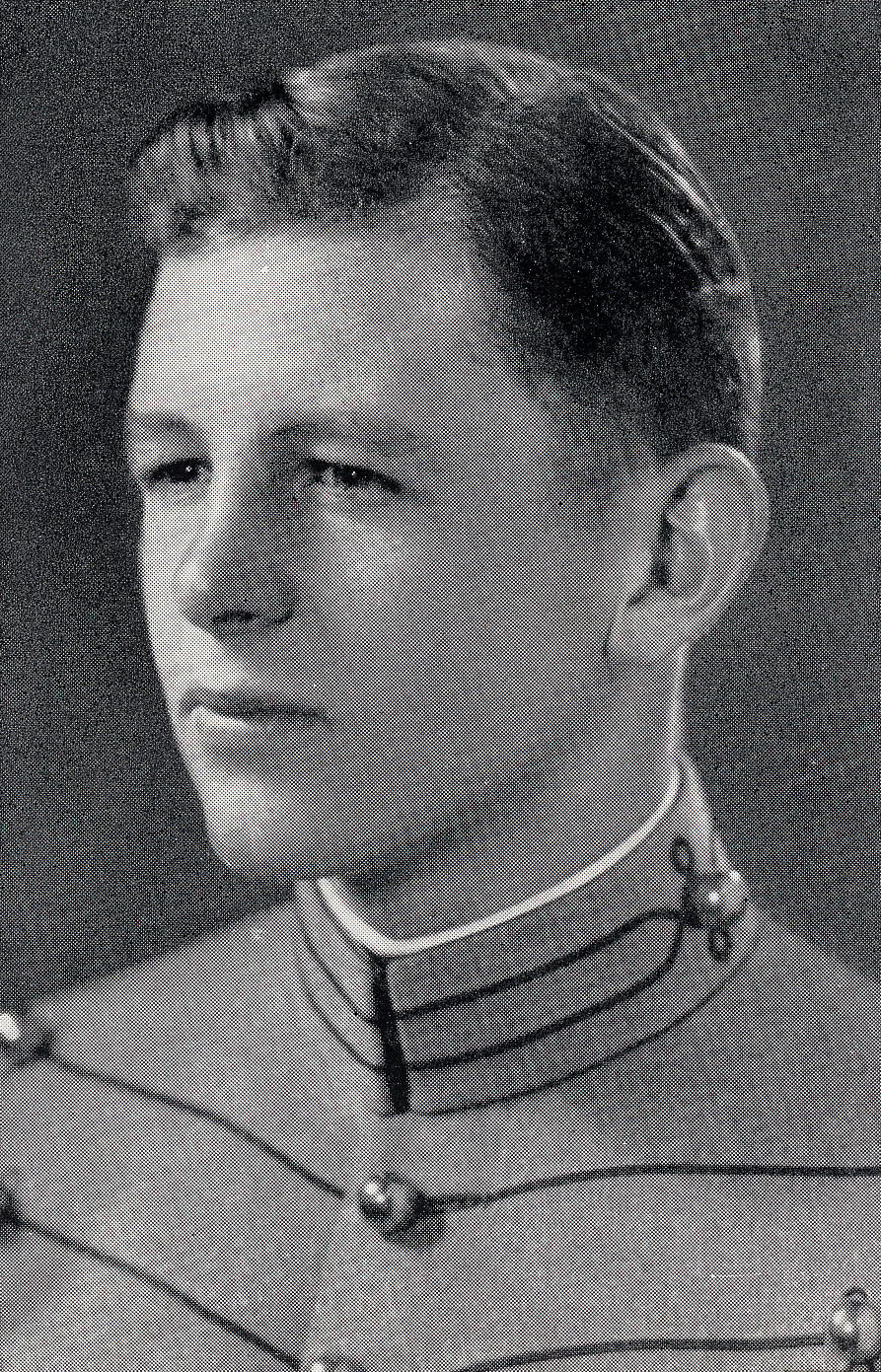
Mearns as a United States Military Academy cadet c. 1938

Born into a military family in Utah and raised in Berkeley, California, Mearns started at West Point in July 1934 graduating with a B.S. degree and a second lieutenant's commission in June 1938.

== Military career ==
=== World War II ===
Following the United States entry into World War II, Mearns graduated from the Command and General Staff School in 1942 and transferred to III Corps where he served as assistant Operations officer (G-3). He then served in the same capacity with VI Corps. In November 1943, he was appointed commander of the 3rd Battalion, 135th Infantry Regiment and led this unit in the invasion of Sicily and the invasion of Italy.

Mearns was awarded the Silver Star for his actions on 16/17 January 1944 when his unit was trying to cross the Rapido River during the Battle of Monte Cassino.

=== Postwar ===
Mearns attended Columbia University studying Russian language and Soviet studies. He then served as G-3 of United States forces in Austria and as United States representative on the four-party Military Committee in Vienna.

In 1950 he graduated from the Artillery and Guided Missile School and then took command of the 75th Artillery Battalion, 17th Artillery Group and then the 77th Artillery Group.

In 1952 he attended the Armed Forces Staff College and was then appointed director, Special Forces Department of the Unconventional Warfare School at Fort Bragg. In 1954 he graduated from the Strategic Intelligence School.

In 1954 he was appointed United States Army Attaché to the Soviet Union and served in Moscow until 1957. On returning to the United States he attended the Army War College, graduating in 1958. He then served as G-3, Sixth United States Army.

In 1960 he was assigned to command the divisional artillery of the 82nd Airborne Division and then as Division chief of staff from 1961 to 1962.

In November 1962, he was appointed artillery commander, XVIII Airborne Corps. In June 1963 he was appointed artillery commander, 3rd Armored Division. In June 1964 he was appointed artillery commander, V Corps.

=== Vietnam War ===
On 6 August 1967 Major General Mearns assumed command of the 25th Infantry Division at Củ Chi Base Camp.

During his time in command of the 25th Infantry Division, Mearns led his command in the United States response to the Tet Offensive and the May Offensive.

On 3 August 1968 he handed over command of the 25th Infantry Division to Major General Ellis W. Williamson and became Deputy Commander, II Field Force, Vietnam and Commanding General, Capital Military Assistance Command.

He served as commander of VII Corps in West Germany from February 1971 to March 1973.

== Personal life ==
Mearns married Elizabeth Mary "Betty" Boles and they had three children, two daughters and one son.

After his retirement, Mearns and his wife settled in South Carolina. Betty Mearns died in December 1974. He remarried with Virginia "Jidge" (McConnell) Torcom after the death of her first husband and lived with her at Fripp Island.
