= Baltimore Pike =

Auto trail between Philadelphia and Baltimore

Major junctions
- South end: Baltimore, Maryland
- North end: Philadelphia, Pennsylvania

Location
- Country: United States
- States: Maryland, Pennsylvania

Highway system
- Auto trails

The Baltimore Pike was an auto trail connecting Baltimore, Maryland, with Philadelphia, Pennsylvania.

Today, parts of the road are signed as U.S. Route 1 (US 1), US 13, and a small portion of Pennsylvania Route 41 (PA 41). A section of the road within the city limits of Philadelphia and surrounding boroughs is known as Baltimore Avenue, although locals are known to call the Delaware County portion "Baltimore Pike". In suburbs farther west, some sections retain the formal name "Baltimore Pike." Today, Baltimore Avenue's eastern terminus is at 38th Street in Philadelphia, where it intersects with Woodland Avenue (from Southwest Philadelphia and the borough of Darby) and funnels into University Avenue. The road used to continue to Market Street until the University City area was redeveloped.

== Route description ==
=== Maryland ===
The routing of the Baltimore Pike in Maryland follows US 1 from Baltimore northeast to the Pennsylvania border near Rising Sun in Cecil County. The road passes through Bel Air and crosses the Susquehanna River on the Conowingo Dam.

The name Baltimore Pike is given to a section of US 1 Bus. in Harford County between Benson and Main Street in Bel Air. South of Benson, US 1 is named Belair Road. From Main Street, US 1 Bus. follows several streets of various other names before joining with US 1 as Conowingo Road.

=== Pennsylvania ===
==== Chester County ====
The Baltimore Pike enters Pennsylvania from Maryland in West Nottingham Township, Chester County, with the southernmost part of the road in the state a part of US 1, which is a four-lane divided highway at this point. North of the Ridge Road intersection, US 1 becomes a freeway called the Kennett–Oxford Bypass and Baltimore Pike continues northeast as a two-lane undivided road that dead ends near the US 1 freeway. The road heads through wooded areas with some homes, with an older alignment of the road known as Old Baltimore Pike looping to the west of the road. Baltimore Pike comes to the Herr's plant in the community of Nottingham, at which point the alignments of both Baltimore Pike and Old Baltimore Pike are severed, with traffic having to head west and north along Herr Drive to access PA 272. A short distance to the east along PA 272, the alignment of Baltimore Pike resumes as State Route 3026 (SR 3026), an unsigned quadrant route. The Baltimore Pike is a two-lane undivided road and runs north-northeast past a few businesses, crossing into East Nottingham Township. The road curves northeast and passes through a mix of farmland and woodland with some residential and commercial development, running a short distance to the northwest of an East Penn Railroad line.

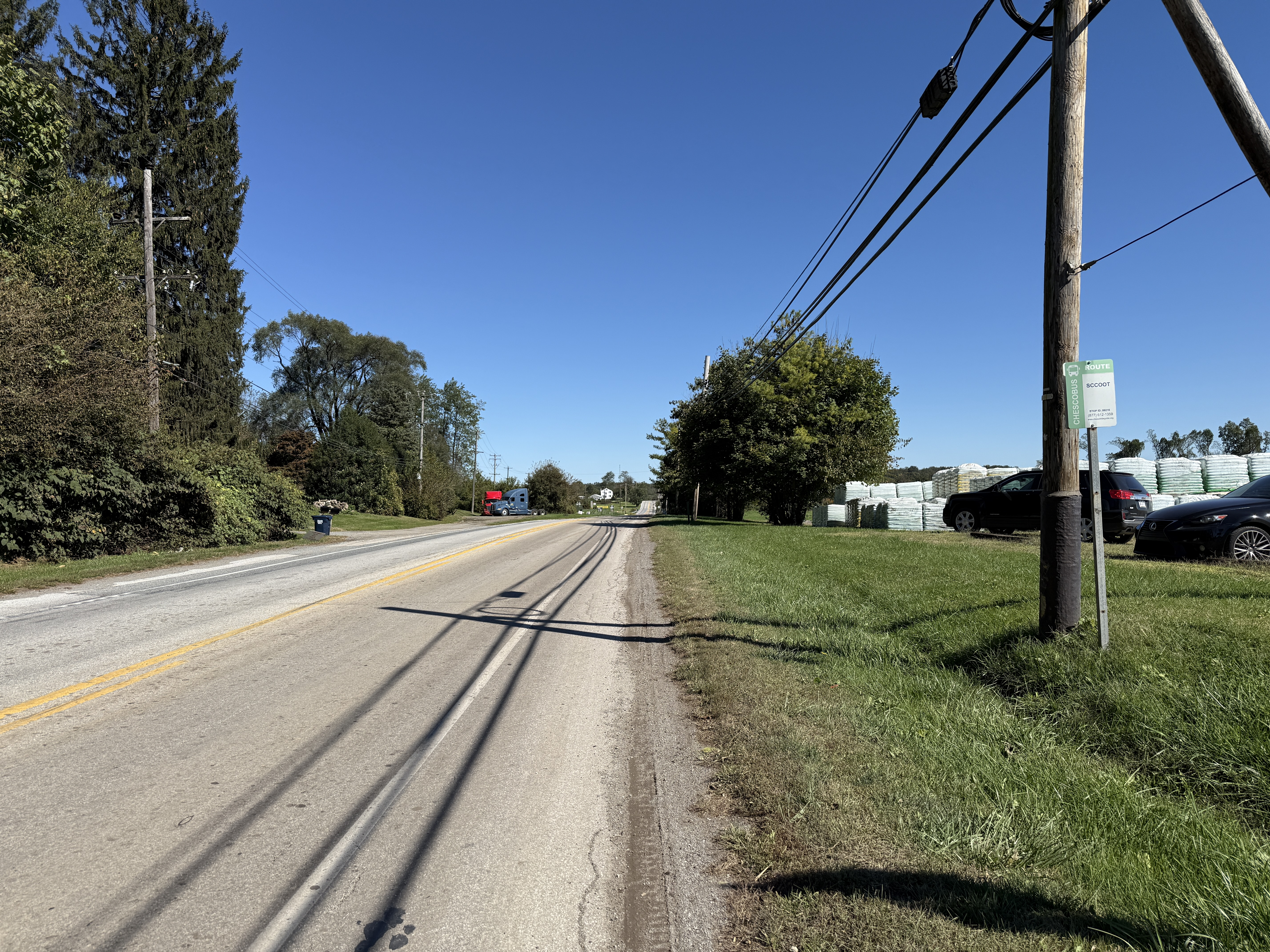
Baltimore Pike eastbound in Lower Oxford Township

Baltimore Pike turns to the north-northeast at the Barnsley Road intersection and passes through commercial areas with some residences before crossing into the borough of Oxford. At this point, the road becomes South 3rd Street and heads north past more homes and businesses. In the commercial center of Oxford, the road comes to an intersection with PA 472 and the southern terminus of PA 10, where Baltimore Pike turns east to briefly follow PA 472 on Market Street before heading northeast on Lincoln Street. The road heads through more residential and commercial areas, crossing an East Penn Railroad spur to a plant at-grade before becoming the border between Lower Oxford Township to the northwest and Oxford to the southeast. The roadway fully enters Lower Oxford Township and the name returns to Baltimore Pike.

Baltimore Pike continues through a mix of farmland and woodland with some homes and businesses, crossing the West Branch Big Elk Creek and passing to the north of the Lincoln University campus. The road continues into Upper Oxford Township and runs through more agricultural areas with some housing developments, coming to an intersection with PA 896. Baltimore Pike heads through more rural areas of with some residential development and curves to the east, crossing the East Branch Big Elk Creek into Penn Township. At this point, the road name becomes West Baltimore Pike and it passes between residential development to the north and farmland to the south before passing north of ChristianaCare Hospital, West Grove. The road heads past a few commercial establishments, reaching an intersection with PA 796 in the community of Jennersville. Following this intersection, West Baltimore Pike heads through farmland before heading into wooded areas with residential developments and crossing into London Grove Township. The road heads near more residences, crossing the Middle Branch White Clay Creek, and enters the borough of West Grove, becoming West Evergreen Street. Here, the road is lined with more homes and comes to an intersection with PA 841, at which point that route joins the road with the name changing to East Evergreen Street. This road curves to the northeast and PA 841 splits north onto Chatham Road. The road heads back into London Grove Township and becomes East Baltimore Pike, continuing through a mix of farms, woods, and development. East Baltimore Pike heads to the east and comes to an intersection with PA 41, at which point SR 3026 ends and Baltimore Pike merges onto PA 41, heading southeast as Gap Newport Pike.

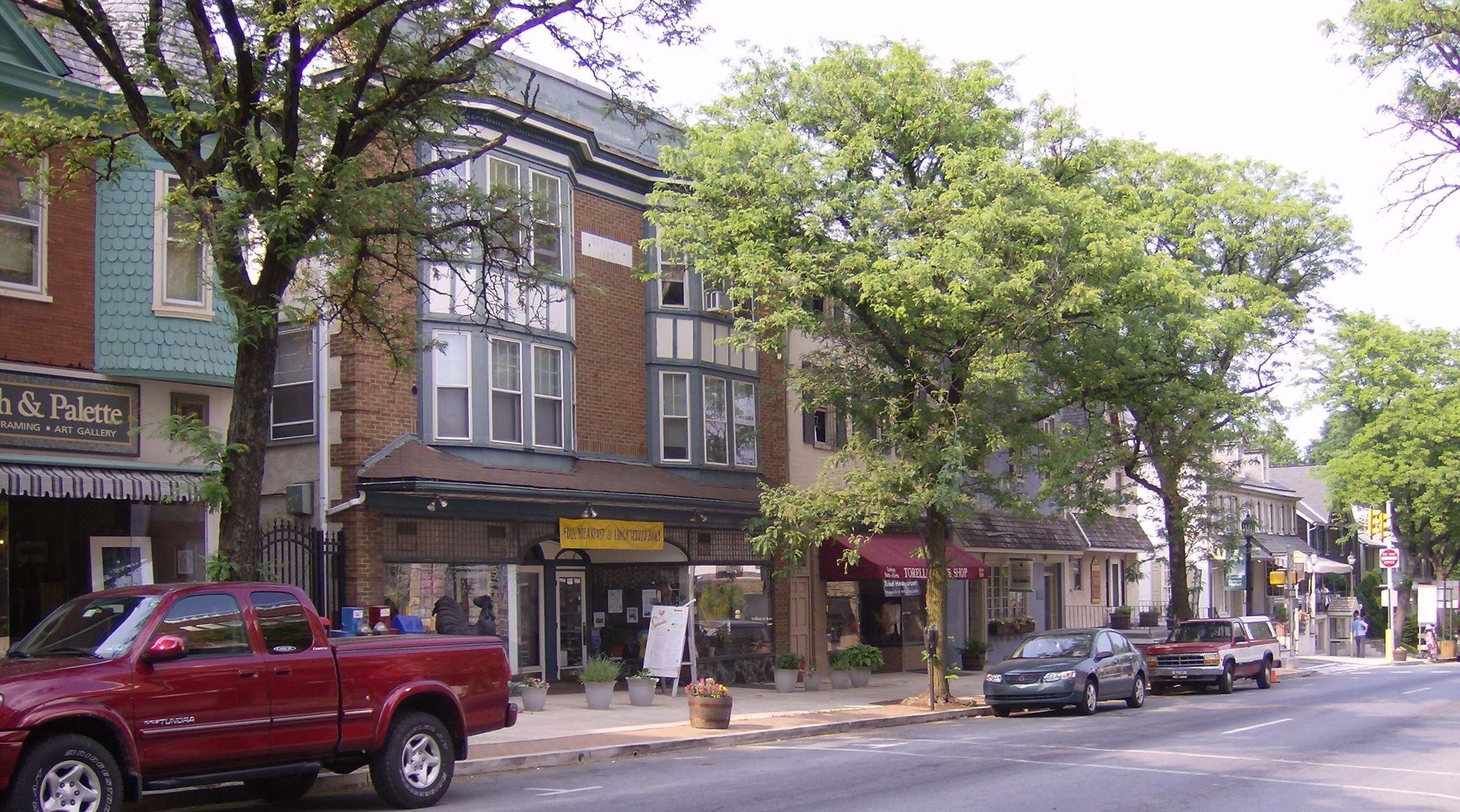
State Street in Kennett Square

The road runs through areas of residential and commercial development before crossing into the borough of Avondale, where the name changes to Pennsylvania Avenue. Through this area, the road passes several homes and crosses the East Branch White Clay Creek. Baltimore Pike splits east from PA 41 as SR 3046, heading northeast into industrial areas to the south of a quarry as a three-lane road with two eastbound lanes and one westbound lane. The road heads into New Garden Township and narrows to two lanes, passing through commercial areas to the south of New Garden Airport. Baltimore Pike continues past more homes and businesses in the community of Toughkenamon. The road heads through more rural areas with some residential and commercial development before splitting into a one-way pair that carries two-lane West Cypress Street eastbound and two-lane West Baltimore Pike westbound. The one-way pair continues through business areas with some farm fields and residential developments, crossing the West Branch Red Clay Creek and entering Kennett Township. Upon crossing into the borough of Kennett Square, the one-way pair becomes borough-maintained and the name of the westbound direction becomes West State Street. The roads continue through residential areas before heading into the commercial downtown. Here, Baltimore Pike intersects PA 82 and the name of the one-way pair becomes East Cypress Street eastbound and East State Street westbound, leaving the downtown area and heading into wooded residential areas with some businesses. The one-way pair becomes SR 3046 at the bridges across the East Branch Red Clay Creek, becoming borough-maintained again after crossing the creek. The roads curve to the northeast and cross back into Kennett Township, becoming SR 3046 again, with the westbound direction becoming Millers Hill. The two one-way roads join again and become four-lane divided East Baltimore Pike, heading into commercial areas and merging into the northbound direction of US 1 at the end of the Kennett–Oxford Bypass, where SR 3046 ends.

At this point, US 1 continues northeast along East Baltimore Pike into East Marlborough Township and passes more businesses, widening to six lanes. Along this divided highway stretch of Baltimore Pike, a few intersections are controlled by jughandles. The road narrows to four lanes and passes near homes and businesses before coming to an interchange that provides access to Longwood Gardens and the Brandywine Valley Tourism Information visitor center to the north of the road, at which point it crosses back into Kennett Township. A short distance later, US 1 comes to an intersection with PA 52, at which point that route heads onto East Baltimore Pike along with US 1. The road heads into wooded areas with some homes and businesses, at which point PA 52 splits in the community of Hamorton to continue southeast toward the city of Wilmington, Delaware. East Baltimore Pike turns to the northeast and crosses into Pennsbury Township, where the official name becomes Baltimore Pike. The road curves to the east again and passes through more woodland with some residential and commercial development, crossing an East Penn Railroad line at-grade before heading across the Brandywine Creek.

==== Delaware County ====
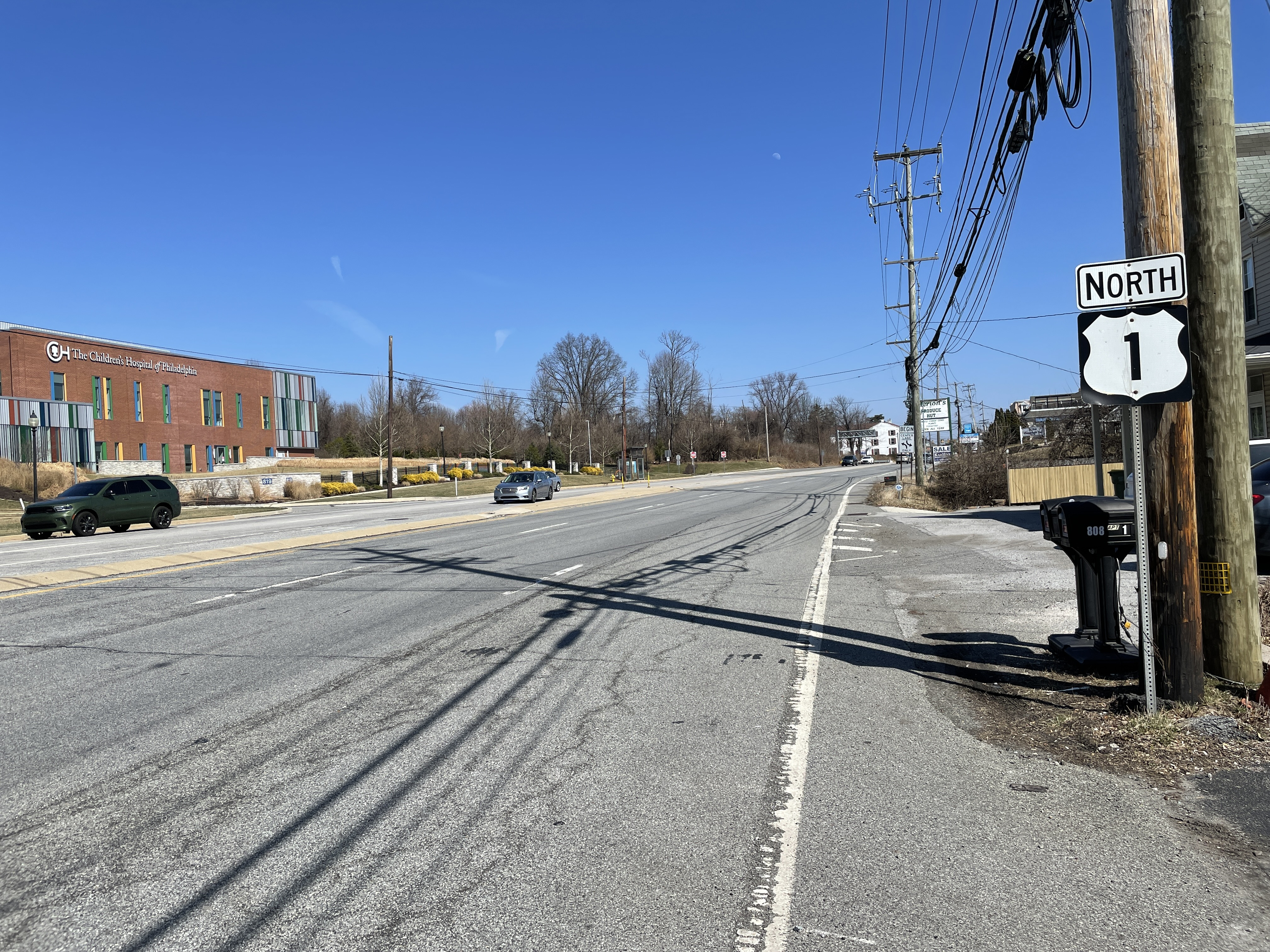
Baltimore Pike (US 1 northbound) past US 322 in Concordville

Upon crossing the Brandywine Creek, the Baltimore Pike continues into Chadds Ford Township in Delaware County and passes to the north of the Brandywine Museum of Art. US 1 heads into the community of Chadds Ford and intersects Creek Road in a commercial area. The road continues through wooded areas with some development, passing to the south of the Brandywine Battlefield. Baltimore Pike curves northeast and heads into areas of businesses, intersecting US 202/US 322 in Painters Crossroads. Here, US 322 turns east to join US 1 in a concurrency along Baltimore Pike, running past more commercial establishments in Concord Township. In Concordville, US 322 splits to the southeast and US 1 continues along Baltimore Pike, intersecting Concord Road before heading into more wooded areas with occasional businesses and crossing the West Branch Chester Creek.

Baltimore Pike curves to the east and enters the borough of Chester Heights, running past businesses before heading into forested areas, where it passes north of the corporate headquarters of Wawa. The road turns northeast and crosses the Chester Creek into Middletown Township. The route passes under SEPTA's West Chester Branch northwest of Wawa Station, which serves as the terminus of SEPTA's Media/Wawa Line. US 1 continues into commercial areas, coming to an intersection with PA 452 in the community of Lima. Following this, Baltimore Pike continues east and passes between the Promenade at Granite Run residential and retail center to the north and Riddle Memorial Hospital to the south, coming to an interchange with PA 352. A short distance later, US 1 splits from Baltimore Pike by heading northeast onto the limited-access Media Bypass.

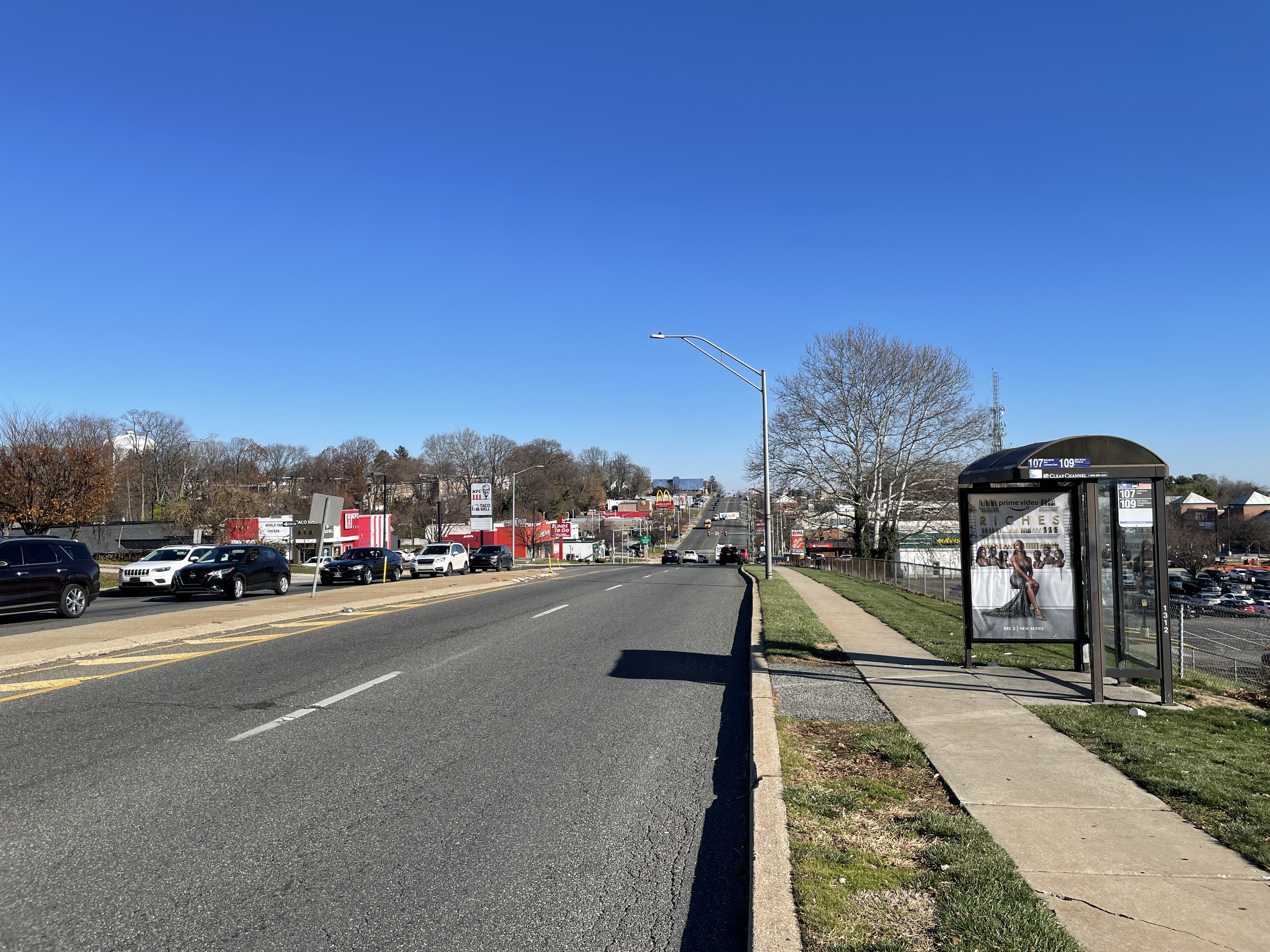
Baltimore Pike eastbound in Upper Darby Township

Past this interchange, Baltimore Pike continues east as SR 2016, passing through woodland and crossing the Ridley Creek into Upper Providence Township. Here, the road turns northeast and enters the borough of Media, narrowing into a two-lane undivided road and becoming West Baltimore Avenue. West Baltimore Avenue curves east and heads into residential areas with some businesses. Upon reaching the commercial downtown of Media, the road intersects Jackson Street and becomes East Baltimore Avenue, passing more businesses and intersecting PA 252. A short distance past this intersection, the road heads into Nether Providence Township and becomes Baltimore Pike again, heading into wooded residential areas with some businesses. Baltimore Pike widens into a four-lane divided highway and comes to an interchange with I-476. Immediately after the interchange, the road crosses the Crum Creek into Springfield Township and passes between the Springfield Mall to the north and wooded areas of homes to the south, at which point it becomes the border between Springfield Township to the north and the borough of Swarthmore to the south. Baltimore Pike comes to an intersection with PA 320 and continues past more businesses, fully entering Springfield Township again and becoming a five-lane road with a center left-turn lane. The road curves to the east-northeast and crosses PA 420, becoming the border between Springfield Township to the north and the borough of Morton to the south past this intersection. Baltimore Pike fully enters Springfield Township and is lined with more businesses.

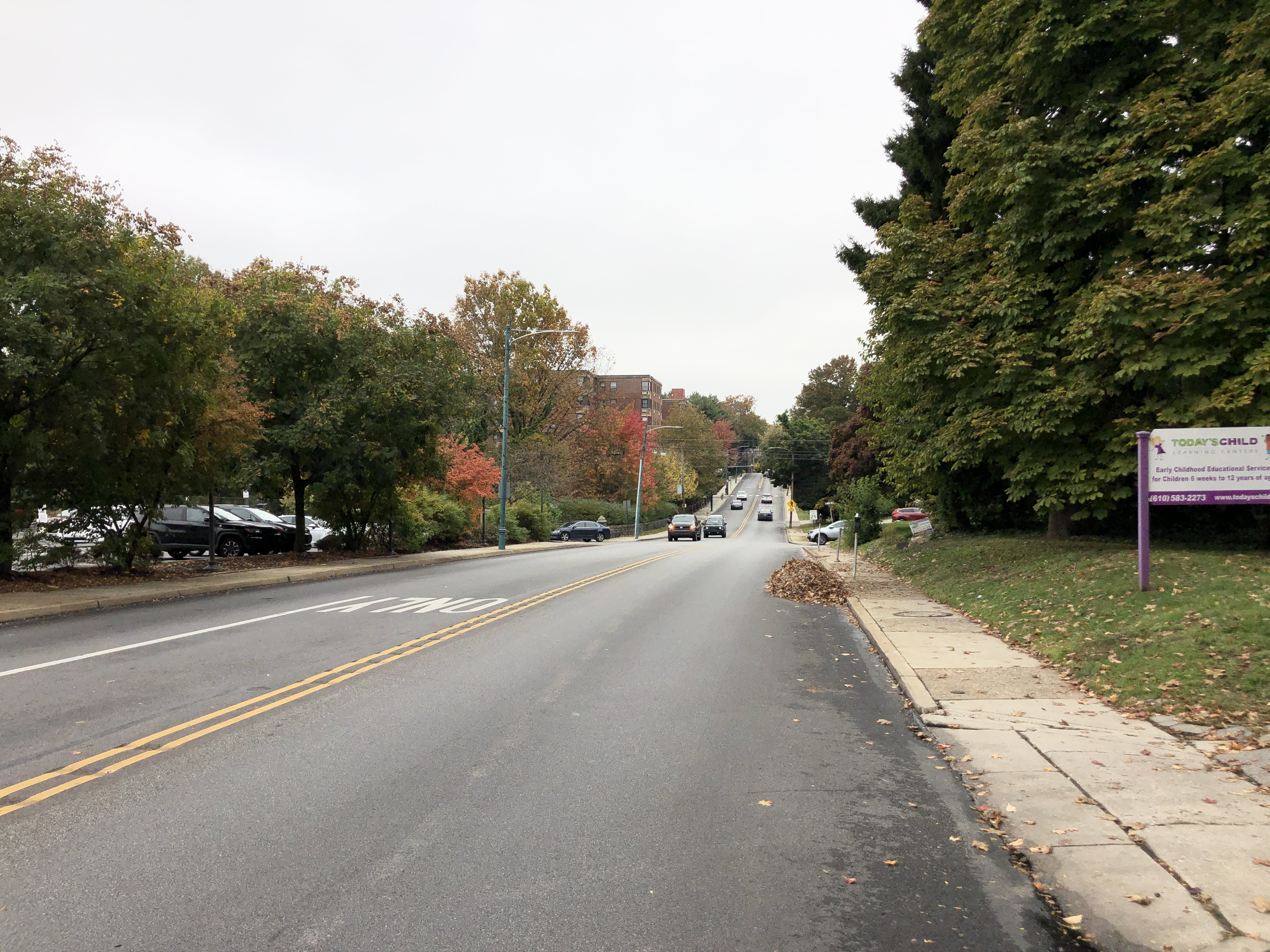
Baltimore Avenue westbound in Lansdowne

At the intersection with South Bishop Avenue, the road becomes a four-lane divided highway and enters Upper Darby Township, where the name changes to Baltimore Avenue. The median turns into a center left-turn lane as the road passes more commercial establishments, becoming the border between the borough of Clifton Heights to the north and Upper Darby Township to the south. Baltimore Avenue fully enters Clifton Heights and passes through residential and commercial areas as a two-lane undivided road. After passing through the commercial downtown, the road crosses SEPTA's Media–Sharon Hill Line at the Baltimore Pike station and runs past more businesses. Baltimore Avenue crosses the Darby Creek into the borough of Lansdowne and heads into wooded areas of homes, curving to the east. The road passes through the commercial downtown of Lansdowne, where it intersects Lansdowne Avenue, before heading past more businesses, crossing back into Upper Darby Township. Baltimore Avenue crosses the abandoned Newtown Square Branch railroad right-of-way and becomes the border between the borough of East Lansdowne to the north and Upper Darby Township to the south, lined with more businesses. The road comes to an intersection with US 13 at Church Lane, at which point SR 2016 ends and US 13 turns east to join the road, which changes names to Baltimore Pike. Baltimore Pike fully enters Upper Darby Township again, passing between Fernwood Cemetery to the north and urban residential and commercial development to the south, becoming the border between Upper Darby Township to the north and the borough of Yeadon to the south.

==== Philadelphia ====
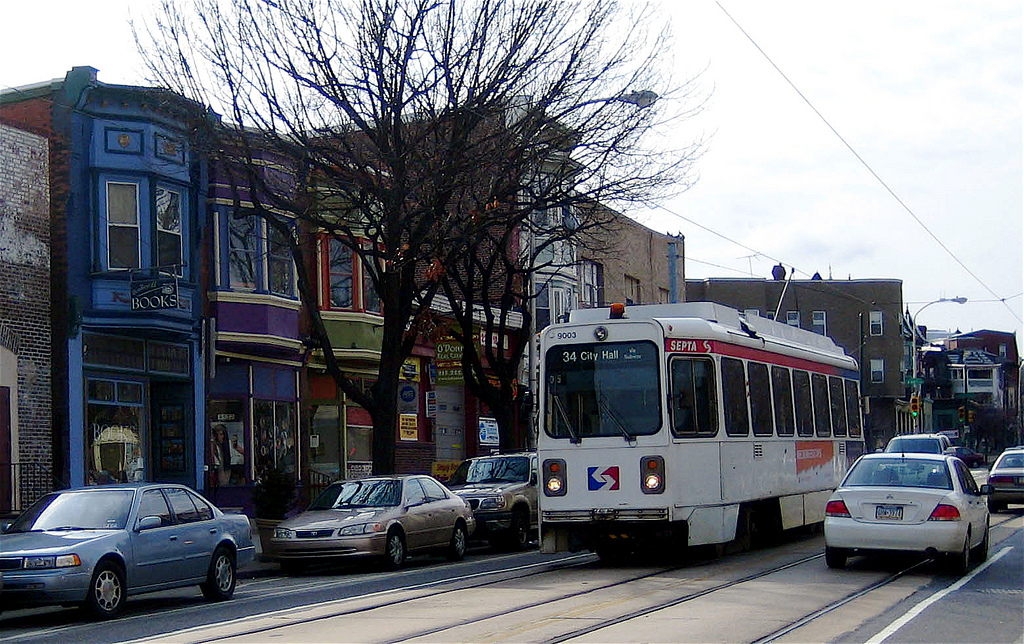
SEPTA's Route 34 trolley line runs through the 4500 block of Baltimore Avenue (US 13) in West Philadelphia

5527 Baltimore Ave in Philadelphia, Pennsylvania about 1919

Baltimore Avenue crosses Cobbs Creek into the West Philadelphia section of the city of Philadelphia in Philadelphia County. Immediately after crossing the creek, the road comes to the Angora Loop at 61st Street, which serves as the terminus of SEPTA's Route 34 trolley line. At this point, the trolley tracks follow Baltimore Avenue as it continues through urban neighborhoods consisting of rowhouses along with a few businesses. The road curves to the east, passing through more urban development with the Route 34 trolley line splitting from Baltimore Avenue at 40th Street, where it heads underground at the 40th Street Portal. The road heads into the University City neighborhood and becomes four lanes at the 39th Street/Woodland Avenue intersection, at which point it runs between the University of Pennsylvania campus to the north and the Philadelphia VA Medical Center to the south. A block later, Baltimore Avenue ends at an intersection with University Avenue, with US 13 turning north onto University Avenue.

== Streetcar service ==
The West Philadelphia section of Baltimore Avenue has carried streetcars since 1890, when tracks were laid for horsecar service. Electric-powered trolleys began operating on the avenue on January 13, 1895. Today, the avenue is served by SEPTA Route 34, which runs on Baltimore from the subway mouth at 40th Street to the Angora terminal loop at 61st Street.

== History ==
PA 12 (1924-1930)

Despite its name, the road was not itself a former turnpike, but portions were, including Baltimore and Jerusalem Turnpike between Baltimore and Bel Air, Maryland. The road's easternmost part was another such section: the Chaddsford Turnpike, depicted on an 1843 map running from Mill Creek (present-day 43rd Street in West Philadelphia) to the western limits of Philadelphia County, in the direction of Chadds Ford Township in Delaware County, Pennsylvania.

Its northern section was designated Pennsylvania Route 12 in 1924. Much of the route was designated as part of US 1 in 1926.

Until 1928, the route crossed the Susquehanna River on the Conowingo Bridge, which was destroyed and replaced by the Conowingo Dam.

Baltimore Avenue formerly continued northward to Market Street as part of Woodland Avenue; this segment was stricken from the City street plan in the late 1950s due to redevelopment by the University of Pennsylvania and what is now Drexel University.
