= Doe Run, Pennsylvania =

Unincorporated community in Pennsylvania, US

- Unincorporated community
- Location within Pennsylvania
- Coordinates: 39°54′58″N 75°49′4″W
- Country: United States
- State: Pennsylvania
- County: Chester
- Township: West Marlborough
- Elevation: 299 ft (91 m)
- Time zone: UTC-5 (Eastern (EST))
  - Summer (DST): UTC-4 (EDT)
- Area codes: 610 and 484
- GNIS feature ID: 1203426

Doe Run is an unincorporated community in West Marlborough Township in Chester County, Pennsylvania, United States. Doe Run is located at the intersection of state routes 82 and 841.

== Notable people ==
- Anthony C. Campbell, United States attorney for the Territory of Wyoming (1885-1890)
