= Pennsylvania Route 472 =

State highway in Pennsylvania, US

Pennsylvania Route 472

Route information
- Maintained by PennDOT
- Length: 20.842 mi (33.542 km)

Major junctions
- South end: PA 841 in Lewisville
- PA 10 in Oxford; US 1 in Oxford
- North end: PA 372 in Quarryville

Location
- Country: United States
- State: Pennsylvania
- Counties: Chester, Lancaster

Highway system
- Pennsylvania State Route System; Interstate; US; State; Scenic; Legislative
← PA 471	→ PA 474

Pennsylvania Route 472 (PA 472) is a north–south state highway in Chester and Lancaster counties in Pennsylvania. Its southern terminus is at PA 841 in Lewisville 300 yards (270 m) north of the Maryland border. Its northern terminus is at PA 372 in Quarryville. PA 472 is a two-lane undivided road that passes through mostly rural areas along a northwest-southeast alignment. The route passes through the borough of Oxford, where it intersects the southern terminus of PA 10 and has an interchange with U.S. Route 1 (US 1). PA 472 was originally designated in 1928 between US 1/PA 12/PA 42 in Oxford and PA 372 in Quarryville. The route was extended south to Hickory Hill by 1930, at which time the entire length of the route was paved. The southern terminus of PA 472 was extended to PA 841 in Lewisville in 1937.

== Route description ==
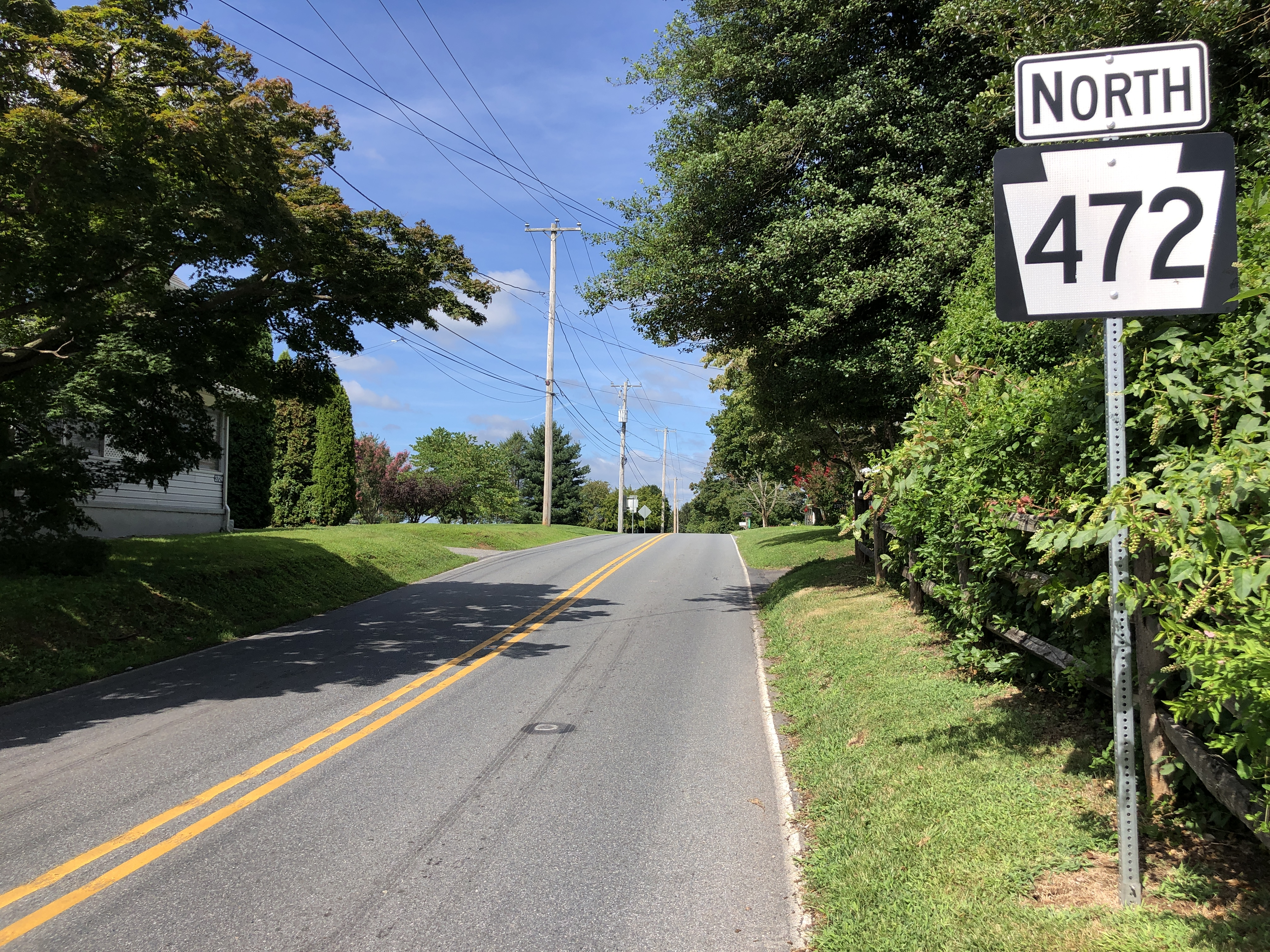
PA 472 northbound past the southern terminus at PA 841 in Lewisville

PA 472 begins at an intersection with PA 841 in the community of Lewisville in Elk Township, Chester County a short distance north of the Maryland border. From this intersection, the route heads west-northwest on two-lane undivided Lewisville Road. The road runs through farms and residential areas, curving to the north. PA 472 runs through a mix of farmland and woodland with some homes, turning west and passing through the community of Peacedale. The route curves northwest and comes to the community of Hickory Hill, where it turns north onto Hickory Hill Road. PA 472 continues northwest into East Nottingham Township and passes through rural land with mixed residential subdivisions. The road curves west and enters the borough of Oxford, where it becomes Market Street and is lined with homes. The route heads into the commercial downtown and crosses an East Penn Railroad line at-grade before intersecting Lincoln Street and the southern terminus of PA 10 at Third Street. At this point, PA 472 turns north for a one block concurrency with PA 10 on Third Street before splitting by turning northwest onto Lancaster Avenue. The road turns west and heads through residential areas with some farm fields, becoming Lancaster Pike and reaching an interchange with the US 1 freeway. A park and ride lot is situated within the northeast quadrant of this interchange. Past this interchange, the route leaves Oxford for Lower Oxford Township and heads northwest through farmland with some wooded areas and homes, passing through the community of Mount Vernon.

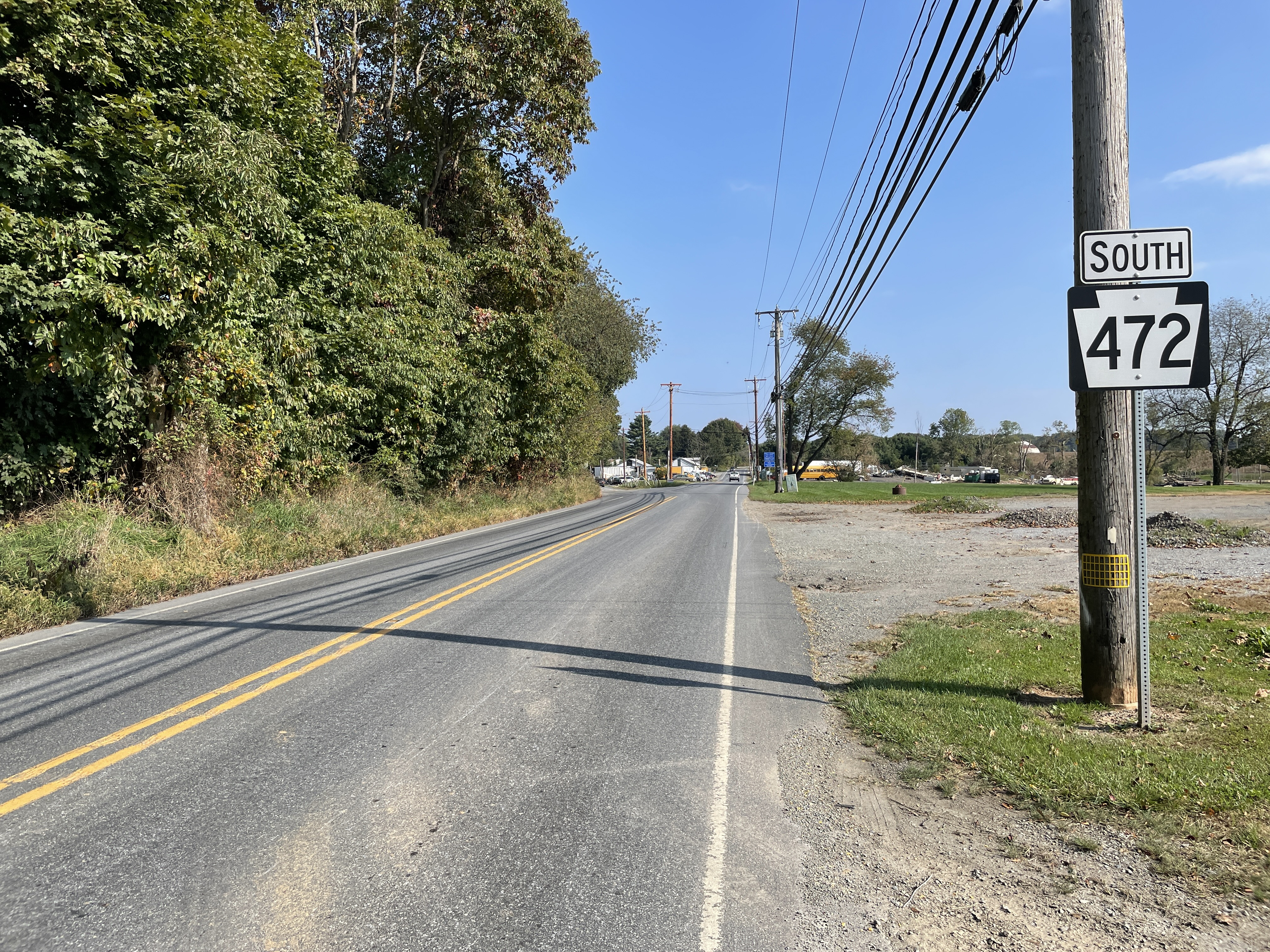
PA 472 southbound in East Nottingham Township

PA 472 crosses the Octoraro Lake along the East Branch Octoraro Creek into Colerain Township in Lancaster County and becomes Kirkwood Pike. At this point, the route enters the Pennsylvania Dutch Country of eastern Lancaster County, which is home to many Amish farms. The road runs through agricultural areas with some woods and homes, passing through the community of Union before reaching the community of Kirkwood. Here, the route turns west-northwest through more rural land with some development, crossing the West Branch Octoraro Creek. PA 472 passes through the community of Collins before crossing into Eden Township. The road continues into the borough of Quarryville and becomes South Lime Street, passing homes and some businesses. PA 472 reaches its northern terminus at an intersection with PA 372.

== History ==
When Pennsylvania first legislated routes in 1911, present-day PA 472 was not given a route number. PA 472 was designated in 1928 to run from US 1/PA 12/PA 42 (now PA 10) in Oxford northwest to PA 372 in Quarryville, following its current alignment. At this time, the roadway was paved near Oxford and between Kirkwood and a point northwest of Collins. By 1930, PA 472 was extended south from Oxford to Hickory Hill along a roadway under construction. By this time, the entire length between Oxford and Quarryville was paved. In 1937, the southern terminus of PA 472 was extended from Hickory Hill to its current location at PA 841 in Lewisville along a paved road. PA 472 has remained along the same alignment since.

== Major intersections ==
County	Location	mi	km	Destinations	Notes
Chester	Elk Township	0.000	0.000	PA 841 (Chesterville Road) to MD 213	Southern terminus
Chester	Oxford	7.745	12.464	PA 10 begins (North Third Street)	Southern terminus of PA 10; south end of PA 10 overlap
Chester	Oxford	7.766	12.498	PA 10 north (North Third Street) – Cochranville	North end of PA 10 overlap
Chester	Oxford	8.708	14.014	US 1 (Kennett–Oxford Bypass) – Kennett Square, Rising Sun	Interchange
Lancaster	Quarryville	20.842	33.542	PA 372 (East State Street) to US 222 – Buck, Lancaster, Christiana	Northern terminus
1.000 mi = 1.609 km; 1.000 km = 0.621 mi: Concurrency terminus
