= Pennsylvania Route 82 =

State highway in Chester County, Pennsylvania, United States

Pennsylvania Route 82
- Current alignment of PA 82 in red, former extension in blue

Route information
- Maintained by PennDOT and East Marlborough Township
- Length: 31.630 mi (50.904 km)
- Existed: 1928–present

Major junctions
- South end: DE 82 at the Delaware state line in Kennett Township
- US 1 in Kennett Square; PA 926 in East Marlborough Township; PA 162 / PA 842 in Unionville; PA 841 in Doe Run; PA 372 in Coatesville; US 30 Bus. in Coatesville; US 30 near Coatesville; US 322 in West Brandywine Township; PA 345 in West Nantmeal Township; PA 401 in Elverson
- North end: PA 23 in Elverson

Location
- Country: United States
- State: Pennsylvania
- Counties: Chester

Highway system
- Pennsylvania State Route System; Interstate; US; State; Scenic; Legislative
← I-81E	→ I-83

Pennsylvania Route 82 (PA 82) is a 32-mile-long (51 km) north–south state highway located in Chester County in southeast Pennsylvania, USA. The southern terminus is at the Delaware state line southeast of Kennett Square, where the road continues south into that state as Delaware Route 82 (DE 82). The northern terminus is at PA 23 in Elverson. PA 82 heads through rural areas of Chester County along with the communities of Kennett Square, Unionville, and Coatesville. The route intersects many important roads including U.S. Route 1 (US 1) near Kennett Square, PA 162 and PA 842 in Unionville, US 30 in Coatesville, and US 322 in Brandywine Manor. PA 82 is a two-lane undivided road most of its length.

PA 82 was originally designated in 1928 between the Delaware border and US 422/PA 17 in Baumstown, Berks County, following its current route to Elverson and heading north through Birdsboro to Baumstown. The route within East Marlborough Township was transferred to township maintenance in 1998. In 1987, flooding from Tropical Depression Nine along the Hay Creek south of Birdsboro destroyed several bridges along PA 82; these bridges were never repaired. As a result, the northern terminus of PA 82 was cut back to Elverson in 2008, with the portion of route between PA 724 in Birdsboro and US 422 becoming part of an extended PA 345 while the remaining open portions between Elverson and Birdsboro were designated as unsigned quadrant routes.

== Route description ==
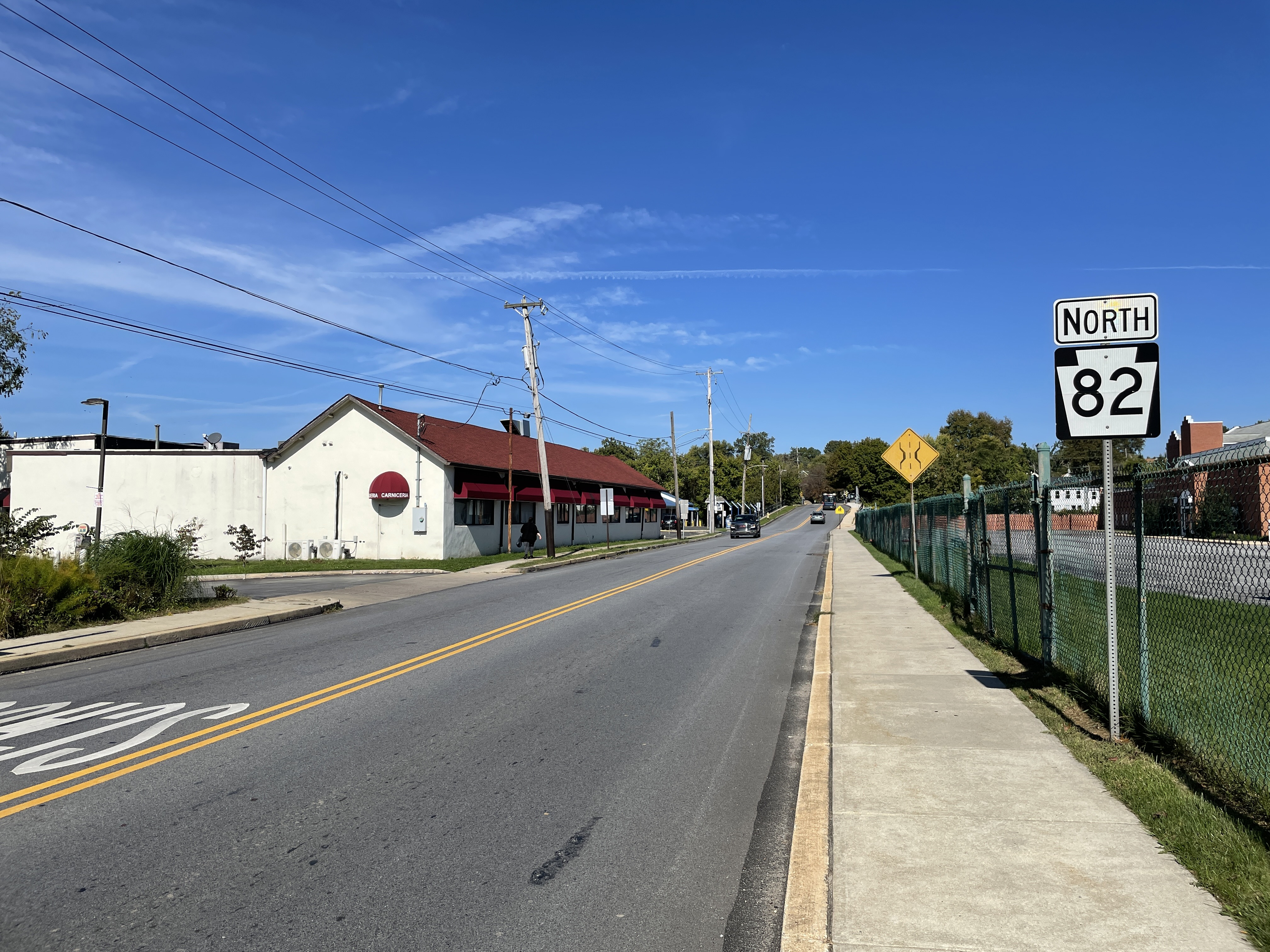
PA 82 northbound in Kennett Square

PA 82 begins as Creek Road at the Delaware state line, where it meets the northern terminus of DE 82, in Kennett Township, Chester County. From the border, the route winds northwest as a two-lane undivided road through wooded areas alongside the Red Clay Creek. The road winds north along the creek's East Branch through more woodland with some homes. PA 82 turns west and heads into the borough of Kennett Square, where it becomes East South Street and passes through residential areas. The route passes north of Kennett High School before it turns north onto South Union Street and heads through commercial areas, coming to a bridge over an East Penn Railroad line. The road runs through wooded neighborhoods before it intersects the one-way pair of Cypress Street eastbound and State Street westbound (both of which comprise the Baltimore Pike) in the commercial downtown of Kennett Square. PA 82 becomes North Union Street and runs through more wooded areas of homes before leaving Kennett Square for Kennett Township again. The route passes a cemetery before it enters East Marlborough Township and immediately reaches a diamond interchange with the US 1 freeway, where the route is a divided highway.

Past this interchange, PA 82 becomes township-maintained and continues north as undivided Unionville Road through wooded areas of residential subdivisions, coming to a junction with PA 926 in the community of Willowdale. The road continues past more housing developments with some farmland, passing to the west of Unionville High School, as it heads toward the community of Unionville. Here, PA 82 intersects Doe Run Road at a roundabout and turns west onto that road. The route passes homes and comes to an intersection with PA 842, forming a concurrency with that route. The two routes intersect the western terminus of PA 162 in the center of the community before PA 842 splits from PA 82 by turning southwest. PA 82 leaves Unionville and continues west on Doe Run Road through farmland with some woods and residences. Upon crossing into West Marlborough Township, the route becomes state-maintained again and continues through more rural areas, curving to the northwest. In the community of Doe Run, PA 82 intersects the northern terminus of PA 841. The road heads to the north and crosses Buck Run into East Fallowfield Township. Here, the route passes more farms and woods before curving northwest into increasing residential development, passing through the community of Ercildoun and intersecting Buck Run Road. PA 82 turns to the north and crosses Strasburg Road. The road curves northeast and passes farmland with some woods.

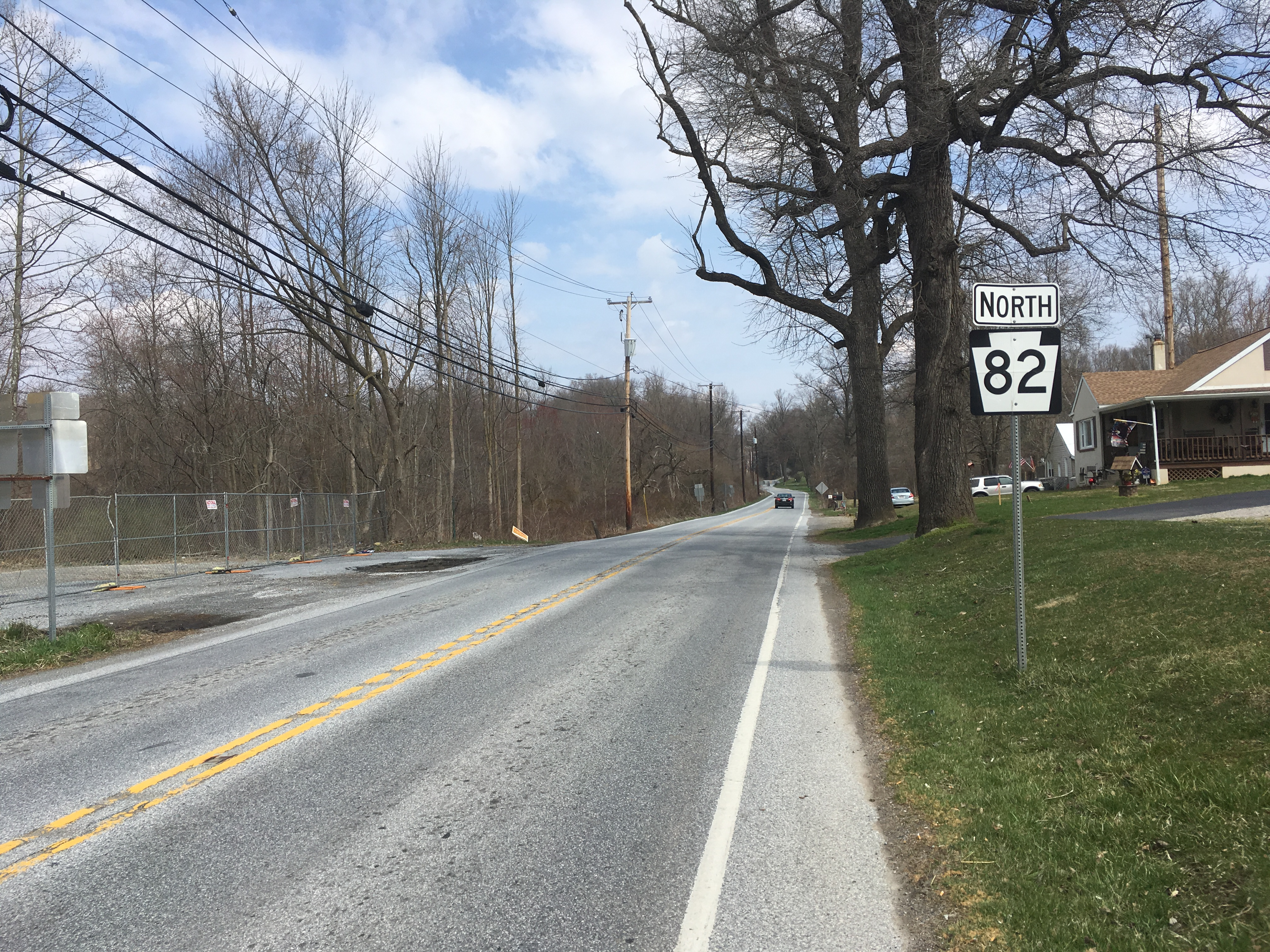
PA 82 northbound past PA 340 north of Coatesville

PA 82 enters Valley Township and heads north near homes on Strode Avenue. The road runs past a Cleveland-Cliffs (formerly Lukens Steel Company) steel plant, where it crosses at-grade two branches of the Brandywine Valley Railroad serving the plant and enters the city of Coatesville. PA 82 intersects the eastern terminus of PA 372 and becomes lined with homes as it reaches a junction with US 30 Bus. At this point, the route turns east for a concurrency with US 30 Bus. on Lincoln Highway and runs past more residences before passing to the north of the steel plant. The road crosses the West Branch Brandywine Creek and a Brandywine Valley Railroad line at-grade before PA 82 splits from US 30 Bus. by heading northwest on four-lane undivided North 1st Avenue. PA 82 passes between the creek and railroad to the west and homes to the east before crossing under the High Bridge which carries Amtrak's Keystone Corridor railroad line. The route becomes a four-lane divided highway called Manor Road and winds north along the east bank of the West Branch Brandywine Creek through wooded hills with some development, becoming the border between Coatesville to the west and Valley Township to the east and reaching a partial cloverleaf interchange with the US 30 freeway.

Past this interchange, PA 82 comes to an intersection with PA 340, where it enters West Brandywine Township and becomes a two-lane undivided road. The road passes through wooded areas with some residences before it heads into a mix of farmland and woodland with development, reaching a roundabout with Cedar Knoll Road/Reeceville Road. In the community of Brandywine Manor, the route crosses US 322. PA 82 continues through rural land with some homes, passing through a part of Wallace Township before it heads into West Nantmeal Township. The road crosses the East Branch Brandywine Creek and reaches a junction with the western terminus of PA 282. The route runs through more farmland and woodland with homes as it comes to an intersection with the southern terminus of PA 345 and Little Conestoga Road in the community of Loag. At this point, PA 82 turns northwest to remain along Manor Road and heads through agricultural areas with some woods and homes. The road curves north and becomes South Chestnut Street, coming to a bridge over the Pennsylvania Turnpike (Interstate 76) before a junction with PA 401. At this point, the route enters the borough of Elverson and runs northeast through residential areas with some fields. PA 82 turns north and reaches its northern terminus at PA 23 in the center of Elverson, where North Chestnut Street continues north as State Route 4082 (SR 4082), an unsigned quadrant route.

== History ==
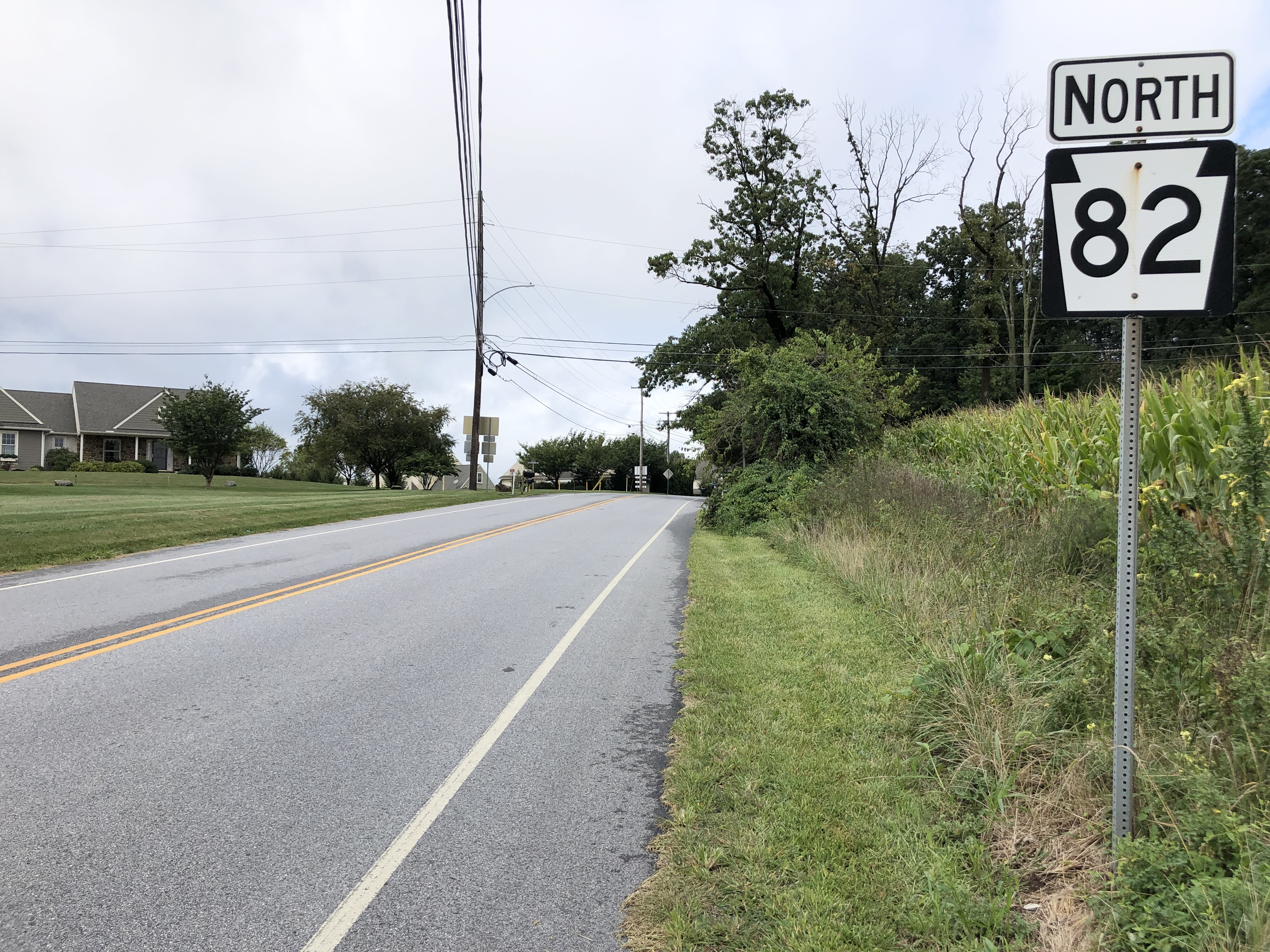
PA 82 northbound past PA 401 in Elverson

When Pennsylvania first legislated routes in 1911, the current alignment of PA 82 between Kennett Square and Unionville was legislated as part of Legislative Route 273, which continued from Unionville north and east to West Chester. By 1926, what would become PA 82 existed as a paved road except for a portion north of Brandywine Manor and between Birdsboro and Baumstown. PA 82 was designated in 1928 to run from the Delaware border south of Kennett Square north to US 422/PA 17 in Baumstown, following its current alignment north to Elverson where it continued north through Birdsboro to Baumstown. By 1930, the entire length of PA 82 was paved. On October 19, 1998, the Pennsylvania Department of Transportation (PennDOT) transferred maintenance of the route within East Marlborough Township to the township due to the township wanting to make improvements to the roads without waiting through the PennDOT approval process.

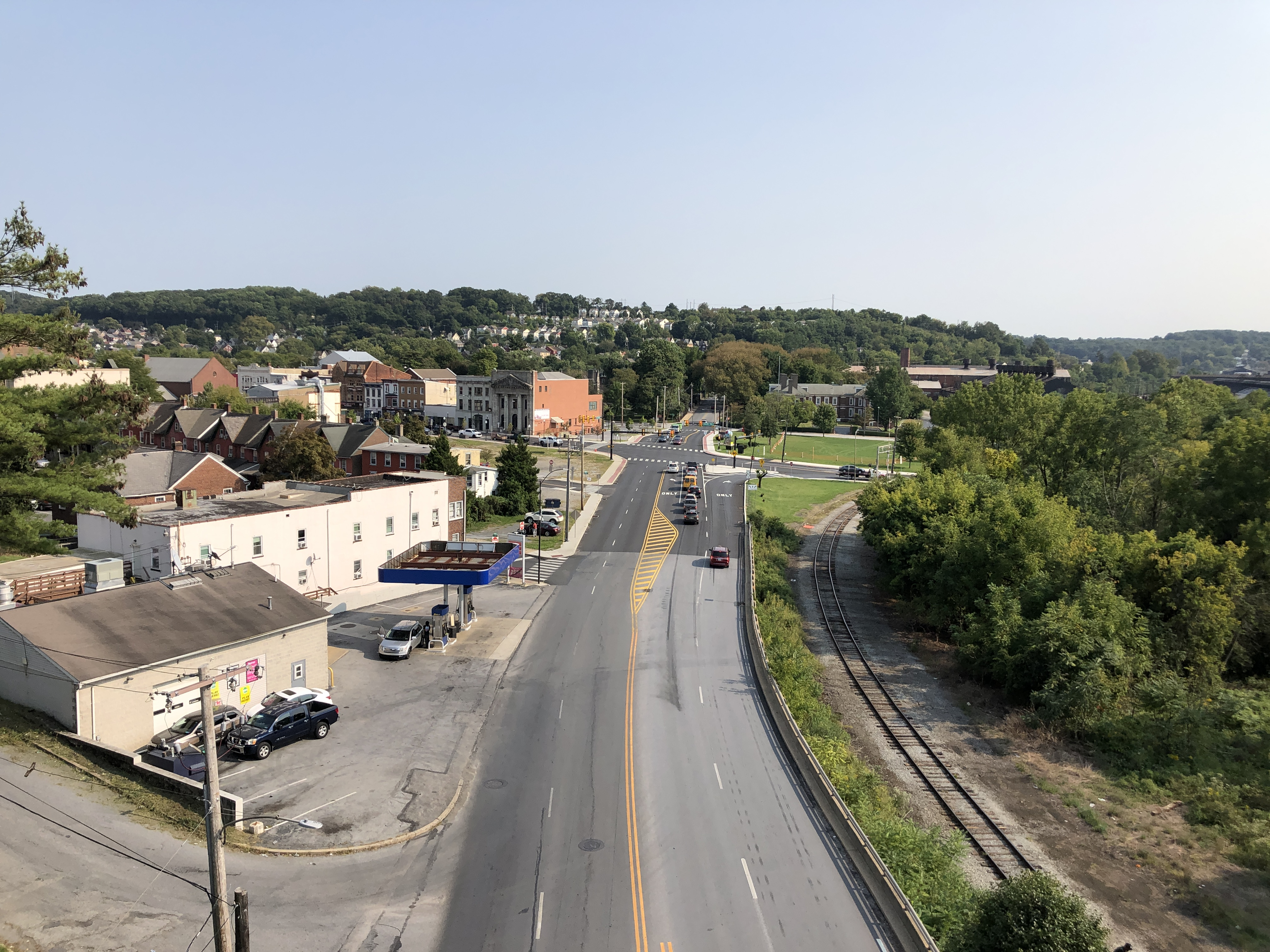
PA 82 southbound entering downtown Coatesville

Prior to 2008, PA 82 continued north through Elverson on Chestnut Street and entered Berks County. It was called Elverson Road, Twin Valley Road and Haycreek Road. In Birdsboro, PA 82 was called Furnace Street and had a small concurrency with PA 724. PA 82 crossed the Schuylkill River and then terminated at a T-intersection with US 422 westbound. On September 8, 1987, torrential rains from Tropical Depression Nine flooded Hay Creek for days and destroyed several bridges that cross the creek just south of Birdsboro. Over the coming months, local residents got used to the lack of traffic and fought to keep the road permanently closed, forcing PennDOT to forgo any possible bridge replacement. However, they did rebuild the bridge just south of Douglas Street. As a result, PA 82 was impossible to transverse from end to end. In late 2008, PennDOT decommissioned this section of PA 82 north of PA 23 in Elverson, designating the old section of PA 82 in Chester County as SR 4082 and the remaining open sections in Berks County south of PA 724 in Birdsboro as SR 2082. The bulk of this area is now part of the Birdsboro Waters Forest section of the Hopewell Big Woods. In September 2010, PennDOT decided to hand over the closed portion of the former PA 82 to local landowners. When this section of PA 82 was decommissioned, PA 345 was extended north of its previous terminus in Birdsboro at PA 724 along PA 724 and then along the former routing of PA 82 to US 422.

In March 2023, construction began on a roundabout at the intersection with Cedar Knoll Road/Reeceville Road in West Brandywine Township in order to improve safety; the roundabout opened to traffic on September 12, 2023.

== Major intersections ==
The entire route is in Chester County.

Location	mi	km	Destinations	Notes
Kennett Township	0.000	0.000	DE 82 south (Creek Road)	Delaware state line; southern terminus
East Marlborough Township	4.601	7.405	US 1 – Baltimore	Interchange
East Marlborough Township	6.531	10.511	PA 926 (West Street Road) – Russellville, Longwood	
East Marlborough Township	7.709	12.406	PA 842 east – West Chester	Southern terminus of PA 842 concurrency
East Marlborough Township	7.769	12.503	PA 162 east (Embreeville Road)	Western terminus of PA 162
East Marlborough Township	8.029	12.921	PA 842 west (Upland Road)	Northern terminus of PA 842 concurrency
West Marlborough Township	12.528	20.162	PA 841 south (North Chatham Road)	Northern terminus of PA 841
Coatesville	17.606	28.334	PA 372 west	Eastern terminus of PA 372
Coatesville	17.831	28.696	US 30 Bus. west (Lincoln Highway)	Southern terminus of US 30 Bus. concurrency
Coatesville	18.243	29.359	US 30 Bus. east (Lincoln Highway)	Northern terminus of US 30 Bus. concurrency
Coatesville–Valley Township line	19.827	31.908	US 30 – Downingtown, Exton, Philadelphia	Interchange
Coatesville–Valley Township line	20.037	32.246	PA 340 – Wagontown, Thorndale	
West Brandywine Township	24.362	39.207	US 322 (Horseshoe Pike) – Honey Brook, Downingtown	
West Nantmeal Township	27.649	44.497	PA 282 east (Creek Road)	Western terminus of PA 282
West Nantmeal Township	29.025	46.711	PA 345 north (Bulltown Road)	Southern terminus of PA 345
Elverson	31.151	50.133	PA 401 (Conestoga Road) – Morgantown, Ludwigs Corner	
Elverson	31.630	50.904	PA 23 (Main Street) – Morgantown, Lancaster, Bucktown	Northern terminus
1.000 mi = 1.609 km; 1.000 km = 0.621 mi: Concurrency terminus

== PA 82 Alternate Truck ==
=== East Fallowfield Township ===
PA Route 82 Alternate Truck
- Location: Chester County, Pennsylvania
- Length: 18.4 mi (29.6 km)
- Existed: 2013–present

Pennsylvania Route 82 Alternate Truck is a truck route around a weight-restricted bridge on PA 82 over Buck Run in East Fallowfield Township, on which trucks over 33 tons and combination loads over 40 tons are prohibited. The route follows US 1, PA 41, PA 10, Gum Tree Road, and Buck Run Road. It was established in 2013.

=== Coatesville ===
PA Route 82 Alternate Truck
- Location: Chester County, Pennsylvania
- Length: 7.8 mi (12.6 km)
- Existed: 2013–present

Pennsylvania Route 82 Alternate Truck is a truck route around a weight-restricted bridge on PA 82 and US 30 Business over the West Branch Brandywine Creek in Coatesville, on which trucks over 30 tons are prohibited. The route follows US 30 Business, Airport Road, and US 30. Signs were posted in 2025.
