= Pennsylvania Route 841 =

State highway in Chester County, Pennsylvania, US

Pennsylvania Route 841

Route information
- Maintained by PennDOT
- Length: 17.316 mi (27.867 km)

Major junctions
- South end: MD 213 at the Maryland border in Lewisville
- PA 472 in Lewisville; PA 896 in Franklin Township; US 1 near West Grove; PA 41 in Chatham; PA 926 near Chatham; PA 842 in West Marlborough Township
- North end: PA 82 in Doe Run

Location
- Country: United States
- State: Pennsylvania
- Counties: Chester

Highway system
- Pennsylvania State Route System; Interstate; US; State; Scenic; Legislative
← PA 840	→ PA 842

Pennsylvania Route 841 (PA 841) is a state highway in Chester County, Pennsylvania. The route runs from the Maryland border in the community of Lewisville in Elk Township, where the road continues as Maryland Route 213 (MD 213), north to PA 82 in the community of Doe Run in West Marlborough Township. The route heads through rural areas of southwestern Chester County on a two-lane undivided road. PA 841 passes through West Grove, where it has an interchange with U.S. Route 1 (US 1). PA 841 was first assigned to an unpaved road running from Springdell to PA 82 in 1928. The route was extended south to its current terminus in 1937 and was completely paved by 1940.

== Route description ==
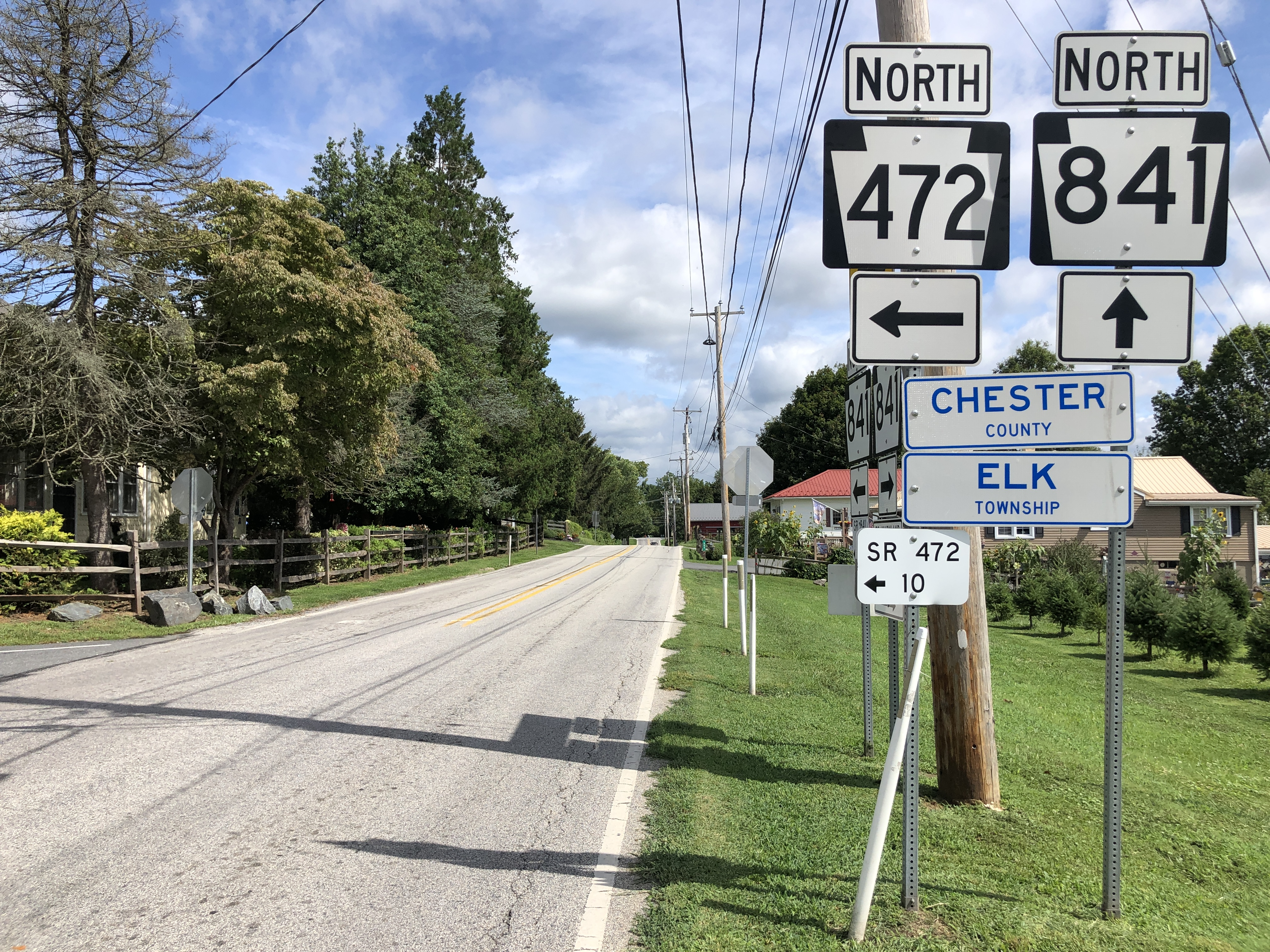
PA 841 northbound at PA 472 in Lewisville

PA 841 begins at the Maryland border in the community of Lewisville in Elk Township, Chester County, where the road continues south into that state as MD 213. From the state line, the route heads north on two-lane undivided Chesterville Road, intersecting the southern terminus of PA 472 a short distance past the state line. The road continues north through a mix of farms and woods with some homes, crossing the Big Elk Creek into New London Township. The route turns to the east and enters Franklin Township, where it curves to the northeast. PA 841 comes to an intersection with PA 896 and continues through rural areas with some residences, crossing the West Branch White Clay Creek. In the community of Chesterville, the route turns northwest onto Wickerton Road. PA 841 curves to the north and crosses the Middle Branch White Clay Creek before it heads into London Grove Township as it continues through rural land with increasing residential subdivisions. The road enters the borough of West Grove and becomes Prospect Avenue, where it is lined with homes. In the center of town, the route passes a few businesses and crosses an East Penn Railroad line at-grade. PA 841 turns east onto Evergreen Street and curves northeast past residences and commercial establishments. The route splits from Evergreen Street by heading north onto Chatham Road.

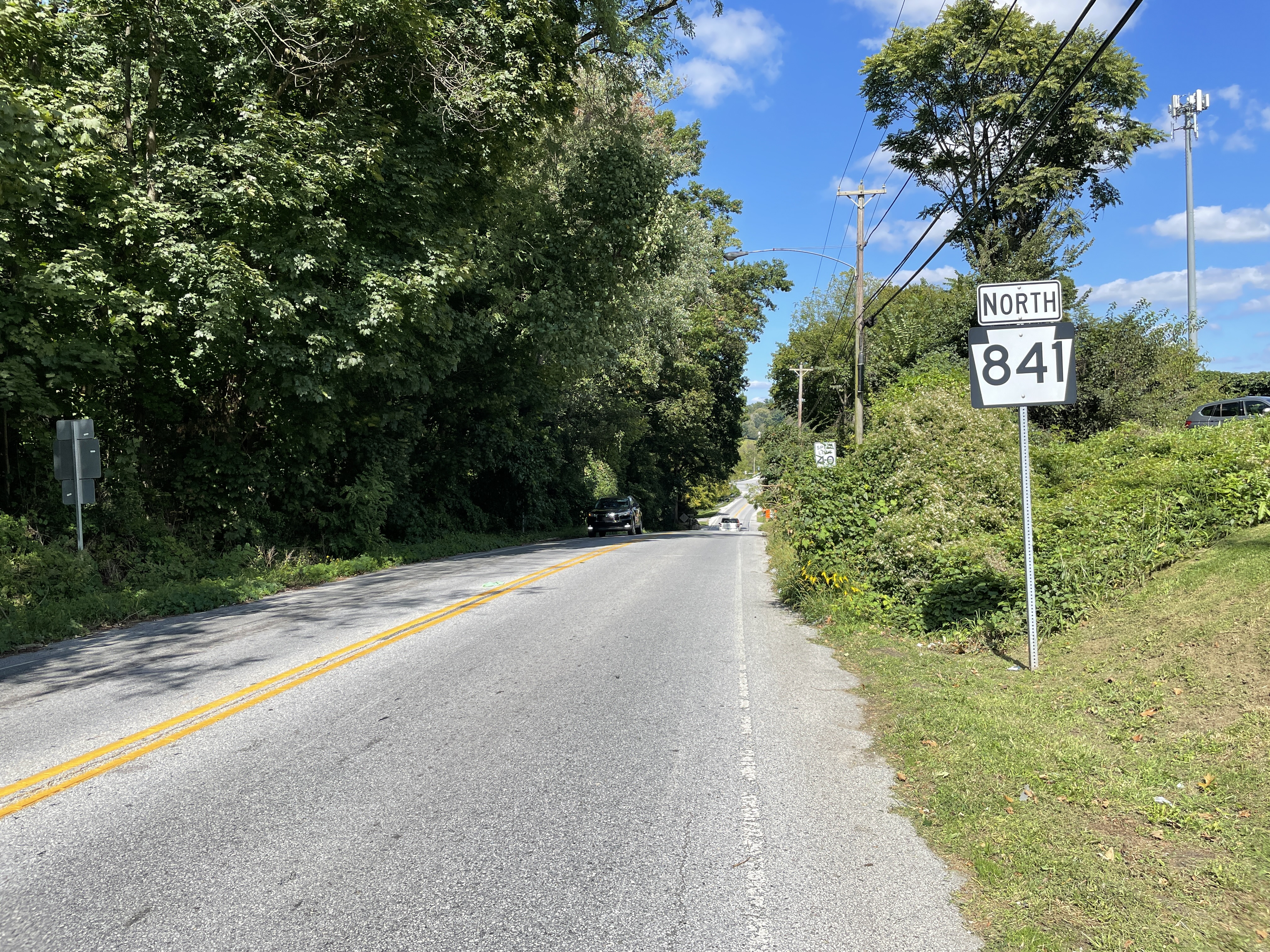
PA 841 northbound in West Grove

PA 841 leaves West Grove for London Grove Township again and comes to a partial cloverleaf interchange with the US 1 freeway. The road continues into a mix of farmland and woodland with occasional homes, crossing a stream on a one-lane bridge. In the community of Chatham, the route turns east onto London Grove Road and comes to a junction with PA 41. Past PA 41, PA 841 turns north onto Coatesville Road and continues north through agricultural areas with a few homes, reaching an intersection with PA 926. Upon crossing PA 926, the road heads into West Marlborough Township on North Chatham Road and makes a turn to the northwest through farmland and woods. The route intersects the western terminus of PA 842 and makes a curve to the north before bending to the northeast. PA 841 continues north to the community of Springdell, where it makes a sharp turn to the east. The route curves northeast through farmland and continues to its northern terminus at PA 82 in the community of Doe Run.

== History ==
When Pennsylvania first legislated routes in 1911, present-day PA 841 was not given a route number. In 1928, PA 841 was designated onto an unpaved road running from Springdell northeast to PA 82. In 1937, PA 841 was extended south from Springdell to its current southern terminus at the Maryland border, following its current alignment. By 1940, the entire length of the route was paved. PA 841 has remained along the same alignment since.

== Major intersections ==
The entire route is in Chester County.

Location	mi	km	Destinations	Notes
Elk Township	0.000	0.000	MD 213 south (Lewisville Road)	Maryland state line; southern terminus
Elk Township	0.037	0.060	PA 472 north (Lewisville Road)	Southern terminus of PA 472
Franklin Township	3.962	6.376	PA 896 (New London Road)	
London Grove Township	9.977	16.056	US 1 (Kennett–Oxford Bypass)	Interchange
London Grove Township	11.846	19.064	PA 41 (Gap Newport Pike) – Cochranville, Avondale	
West Marlborough Township	12.940	20.825	PA 926 (Street Road) – Russellville, Longwood Gardens	
West Marlborough Township	13.764	22.151	PA 842 east (Clonmell Upland Road) – Unionville	Western terminus of PA 842
West Marlborough Township	17.316	27.867	PA 82 (Doe Run Road) – Ercildoun, Unionville	Northern terminus
1.000 mi = 1.609 km; 1.000 km = 0.621 mi

== PA 841 Alternate Truck ==
PA Route 841 Alternate Truck
- Location: Chester County, Pennsylvania
- Existed: 2013–present

Pennsylvania Route 841 Alternate Truck is a truck route bypassing a weight-restricted bridge over a branch of the West Branch of White Clay Creek in Franklin Township, on which trucks over 35 tons are prohibited. Formed in 2013, it follows PA 896, PA 796, Baltimore Pike, and Evergreen Street.
