= Springdell, Pennsylvania =

Unincorporated community in Pennsylvania, US

- Unincorporated community
- Location within Pennsylvania
- Coordinates: 39°54′24″N 75°50′6″W
- Country: United States
- State: Pennsylvania
- County: Chester
- Township: West Marlborough
- Elevation: 331 ft (101 m)
- Time zone: UTC-5 (Eastern (EST))
  - Summer (DST): UTC-4 (EDT)
- Area codes: 610 and 484
- GNIS feature ID: 1204705

Springdell is an unincorporated community in West Marlborough Township in Chester County, Pennsylvania, United States. Springdell is located at the intersection of Pennsylvania Route 841 and Springdell Road.
