= High Bridge (Coatesville, Pennsylvania) =

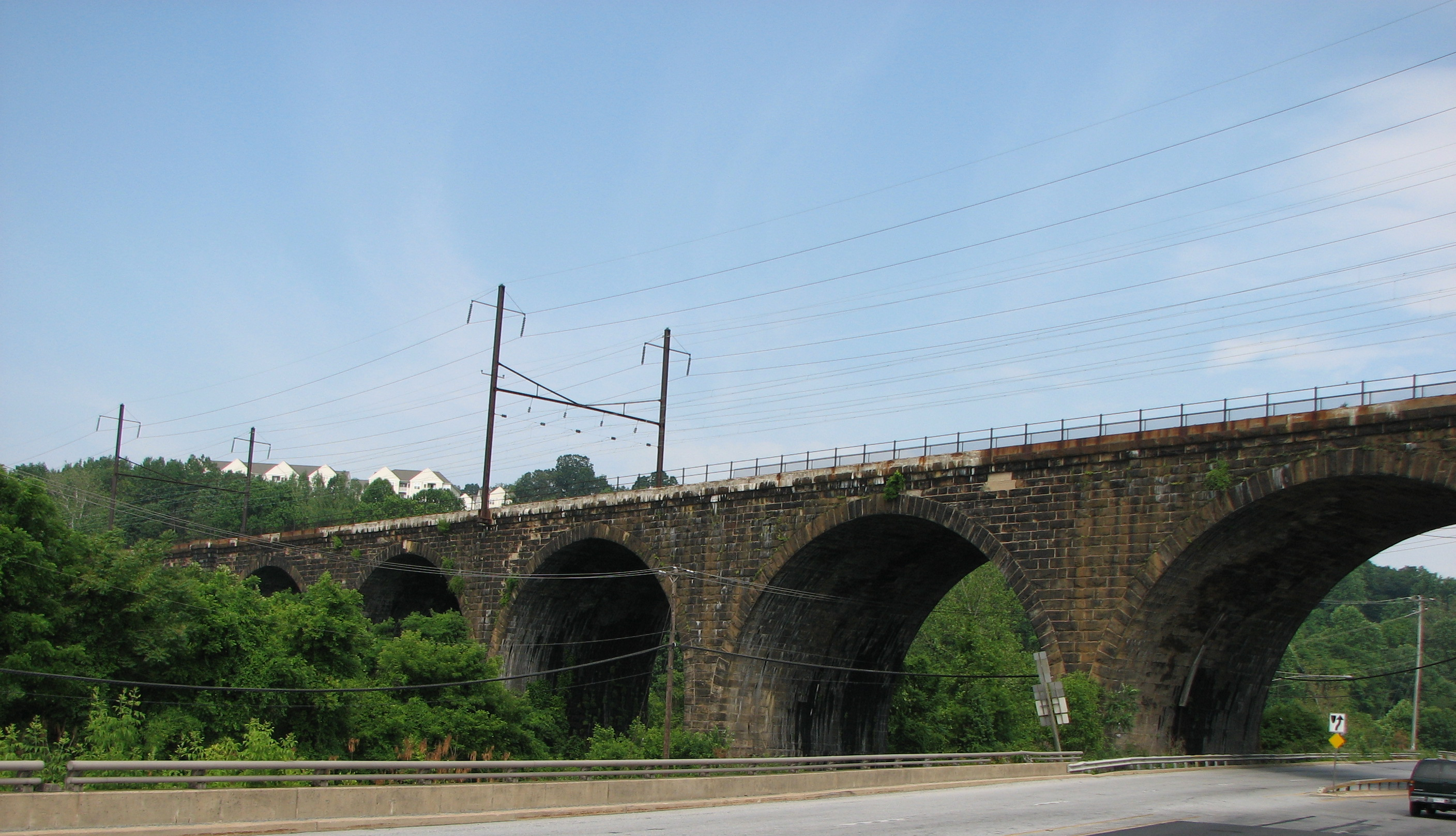
- View of the bridge from the southeast side.
- Coordinates: 39°59′2″N 75°49′39″W
- Crosses: West Branch Brandywine Creek and Pennsylvania Route 82
- Locale: Chester, Pennsylvania, United States
- Maintained by: Amtrak

Characteristics
- Total length: 934 ft (285 m)
- Width: 52 ft (16 m)
- Height: 78 ft (24 m)

History
- Constructed by: Pennsylvania Railroad
- Built: September 1, 1904
- High Bridge
- U.S. National Register of Historic Places
- NRHP reference No.: 76001623
- Added to NRHP: March 26, 1976

Location
- Interactive map of High Bridge

The Coatesville High Bridge is a stone masonry arch railroad viaduct that crosses the valley of the West Branch Brandywine Creek at Coatesville, Pennsylvania. Built by the Pennsylvania Railroad between 1902 and 1904, it has ten arches (eight of 78 feet (24 m) and two of 88 feet (27 m)) and spans a total length of 934 feet (285 m), with wing walls extending it to 1,287 feet (392 m). 78 feet (24 m) high, the bridge was built to accommodate four standard gauge railroad tracks, with a total length of 52 feet (16 m).

The Pennsylvania Railroad's Main Line passes along the north side of Coatesville on the southern slope of the North Valley Hills. The bridge carries the Main Line across the water gap cut by the Brandywine, as well as the former Wilmington and Northern Branch of the Reading Railroad and Pennsylvania Route 82.

== Precursors ==
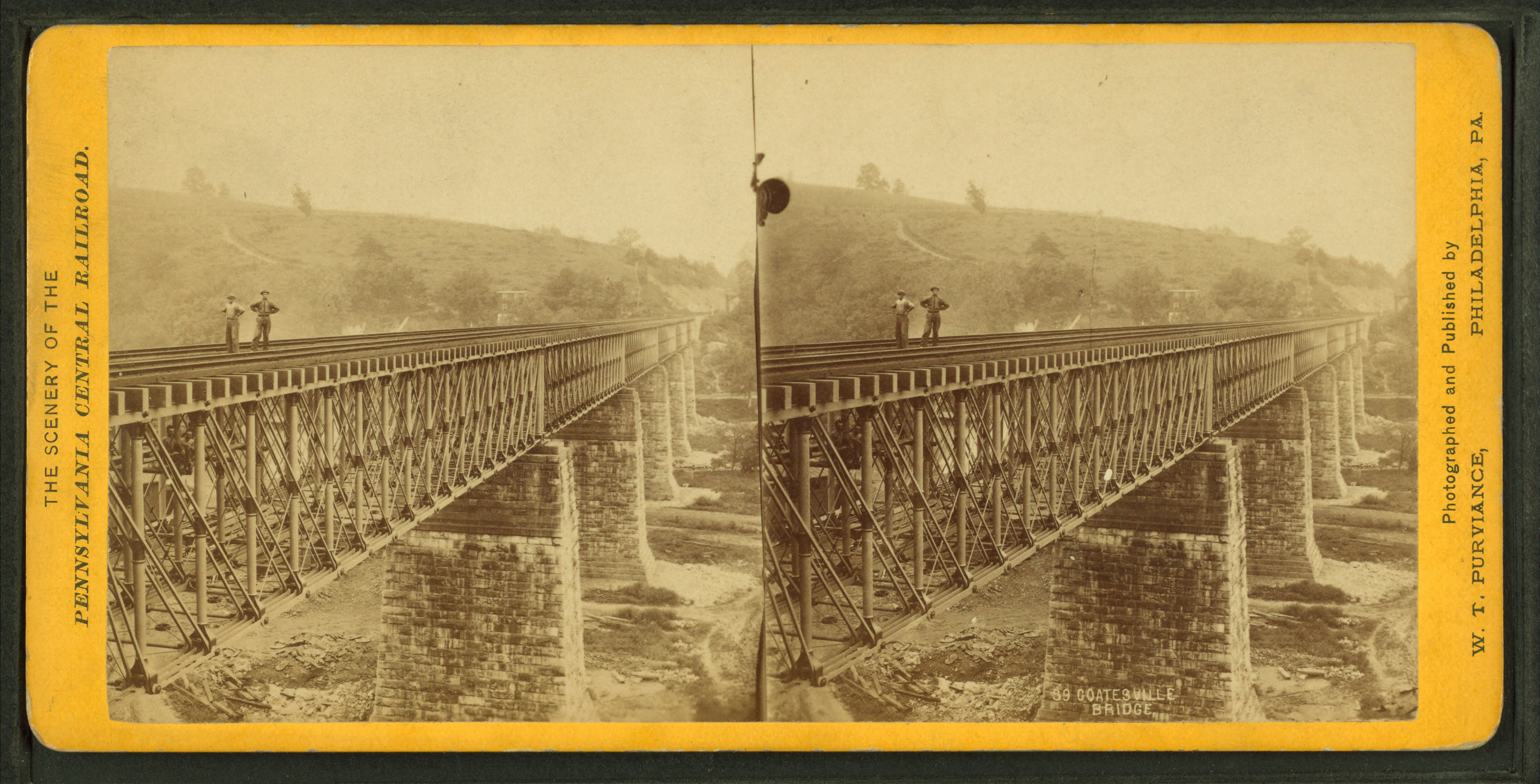
Stereoscopic view of earlier Coatesville Bridge

The first bridge at the site was built by the Philadelphia and Columbia Railroad in 1832. It was a single-track wood span on stone piers. The bridge was widened to double-track in 1854. This bridge was replaced by a cast iron bridge in 1867, and that in turn by a wrought iron Pratt truss in 1890. By around the start of the 20th century, however, the double-track bridge was proving to be a bottleneck in the quadruple-track main line on both sides, and plans were made for a bridge that would carry four tracks across the Brandywine Valley.

== Construction and history ==
While the PRR had been using steel bridges since the 1880s, and was constructing others nearby at the time, such as the High Bridge at Downingtown, President A. J. Cassatt decided in favor of a stone bridge at this location and elsewhere. This reflected the influence of PRR Chief Engineer William H. Brown, who rebuilt many of the railroad's bridges in masonry during his tenure. While more expensive than steel, Brown felt that stone bridges were stronger and more durable, and less expensive to maintain in the long term.

Work on the bridge began in November 1902, locating it slightly to the south of the double-track bridge. The bridge was completed on 1 September 1904 and the main line was realigned to cross it, abandoning the old bridge. The realignment reduced the curvature in the area and completed the PRR's four-track main line from Philadelphia to the Conestoga River bridge near Lancaster.

In later years, a concrete parapet was added to the bridge and the tops of some arches were reinforced with concrete. Catenary poles were added to the bridge with electrification in the 1930s. Ownership of the bridge passed, with the rest of the Main Line, to Penn Central in 1968 and Amtrak in 1976.
