= Anthony C. Campbell =

American attorney and politician (1853-1932)

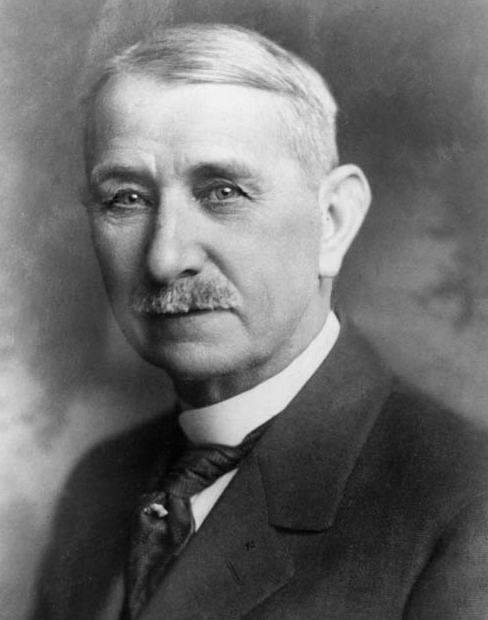

United States attorney for the Territory of Wyoming
- In office June 8, 1885 – 1890
- Preceded by: J. A. River
- Succeeded by: Benjamin F. Fowler

Personal details
- Born: April 1, 1853 Doe Run, Pennsylvania, U.S.
- Died: September 8, 1932 (aged 79) Cheyenne, Wyoming, U.S.
- Party: Democratic
- Children: 2

Anthony C. Campbell (April 1, 1853 – September 8, 1932) was an American attorney and politician who served as the United States attorney for the Territory of Wyoming as a Democrat.

== Life ==
Anthony C. Campbell was born on April 1, 1853, in Doe Run, Pennsylvania. He was educated in public schools and later graduated from law school before being admitted to the legal bar in 1876.

In 1881 he moved to Cheyenne, Wyoming Territory and on June 8, 1885, he was appointed by President Grover Cleveland as United States attorney for the Territory of Wyoming and served until 1890. In 1889 he was selected as one of the Democratic delegates to the Wyoming constitutional convention to draft its constitution to be submitted for statehood. He was later appointed by President William Howard Taft as chief law officer of the reclamation service until 1910 to become counsel for the Denver and Rio Grande Western Railroad. In 1912 he moved to Casper, Wyoming to become an attorney for multiple oil companies and in 1917 he served as president of the Wyoming Bar Association.

On September 8, 1932, he died after a brief illness in Cheyenne, Wyoming.
