= Kemblesville, Pennsylvania =

Unincorporated community in Pennsylvania, US

- Unincorporated community
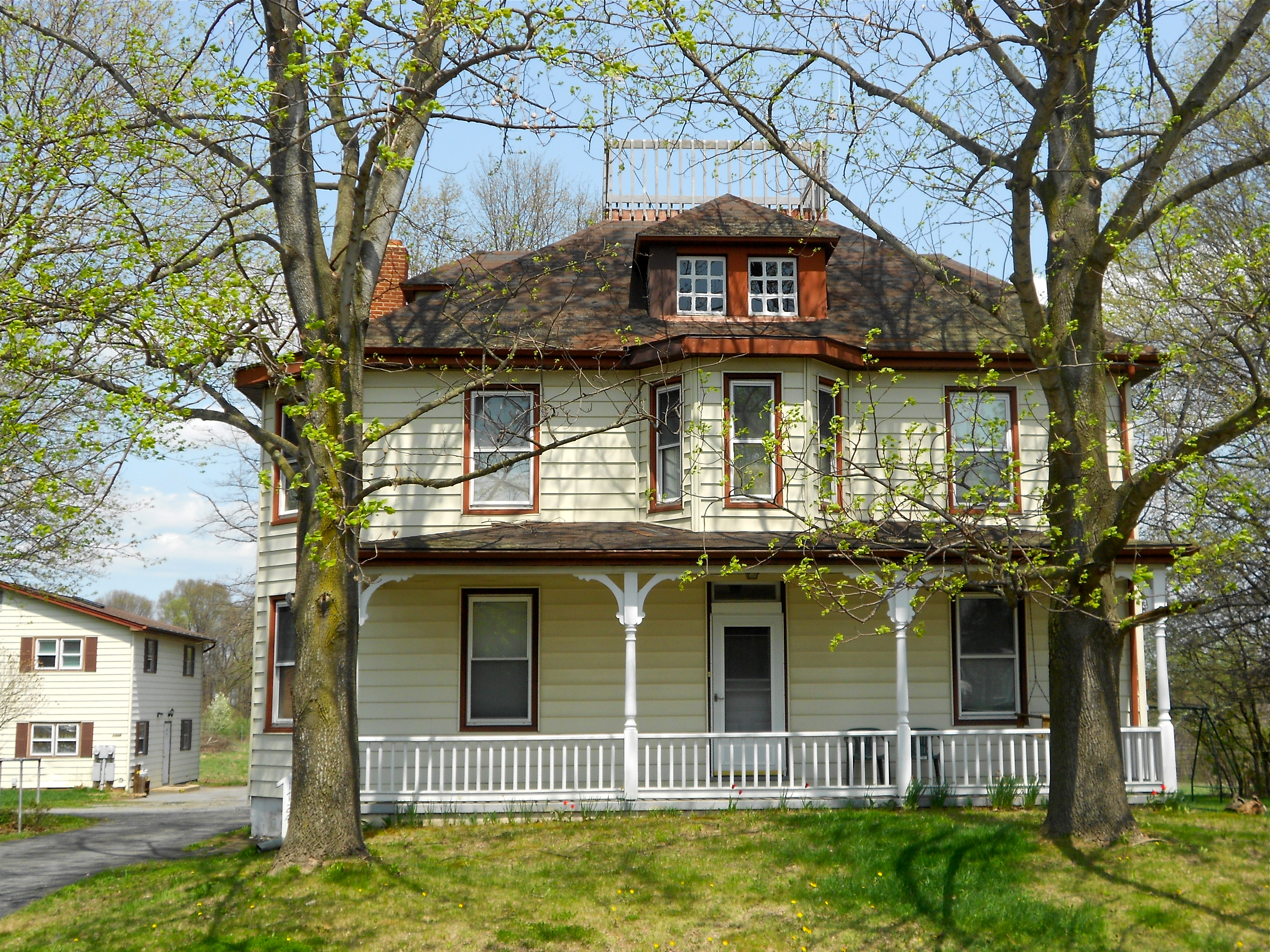
- House in Kemblesville

- Location within the U.S. state of Pennsylvania Kemblesville (the United States)
- Coordinates: 39°44′56″N 75°49′28″W
- Country: United States
- State: Pennsylvania
- County: Chester
- Township: Franklin
- Time zone: UTC-5 (Eastern (EST))
  - Summer (DST): UTC-4 (EDT)
- ZIP code: 19347
- Area codes: 610 and 484

Kemblesville is an unincorporated community in Franklin Township, Chester County, Pennsylvania, United States. Located in the southern part of the county, it lies in the southeastern part of the state.

== History ==
The roots of the village of Kemblesville date back to the late 18th century. Its historic houses and outbuildings are now part of the Kemblesville Historic District, which largely preserves Kemblesville as it appeared in the late 19th century. Originally called Fox Chase, the community derives its present name from the Kemble, or Kimble, family, who settled the area in colonial times and were prominent in the village in the 1800s. Members of the Kemble family are buried in the graveyard at the Kemblesville Methodist church. Kimbelot Lane also derives its name from the family; Parsons Road, to the village's north, derives its name from the Parsons family. Benjamin Franklin is thought to have owned property within the village limits, and the surrounding township is named after him.

In addition to village's historic homes and church, there is a school, a gas station, two automobile repair shops, a pizza parlor, a doctor's office, and a day care center. A building intended for a Happy Harry's drug store was completed but never opened, and the unused property is now a day care center. The US Postal Service maintains a modern post office at the southern edge of the village next to the township municipal building and facilities.

== Kemblesville Elementary ==
The school was built in 1955 and was part of the Avon Grove School District. As part of a reorganization in 2002, the school was closed and replaced by the Penn London Elementary School, housing grades K-2, and the Avon Grove Intermediate School, housing grades 3-6, on a single campus on the Penn Township - New London Township border. The elementary school site was acquired by the Avon Grove Charter School, which reopened the building on September 2, 2008. The facility houses grades K-3.

== Location ==
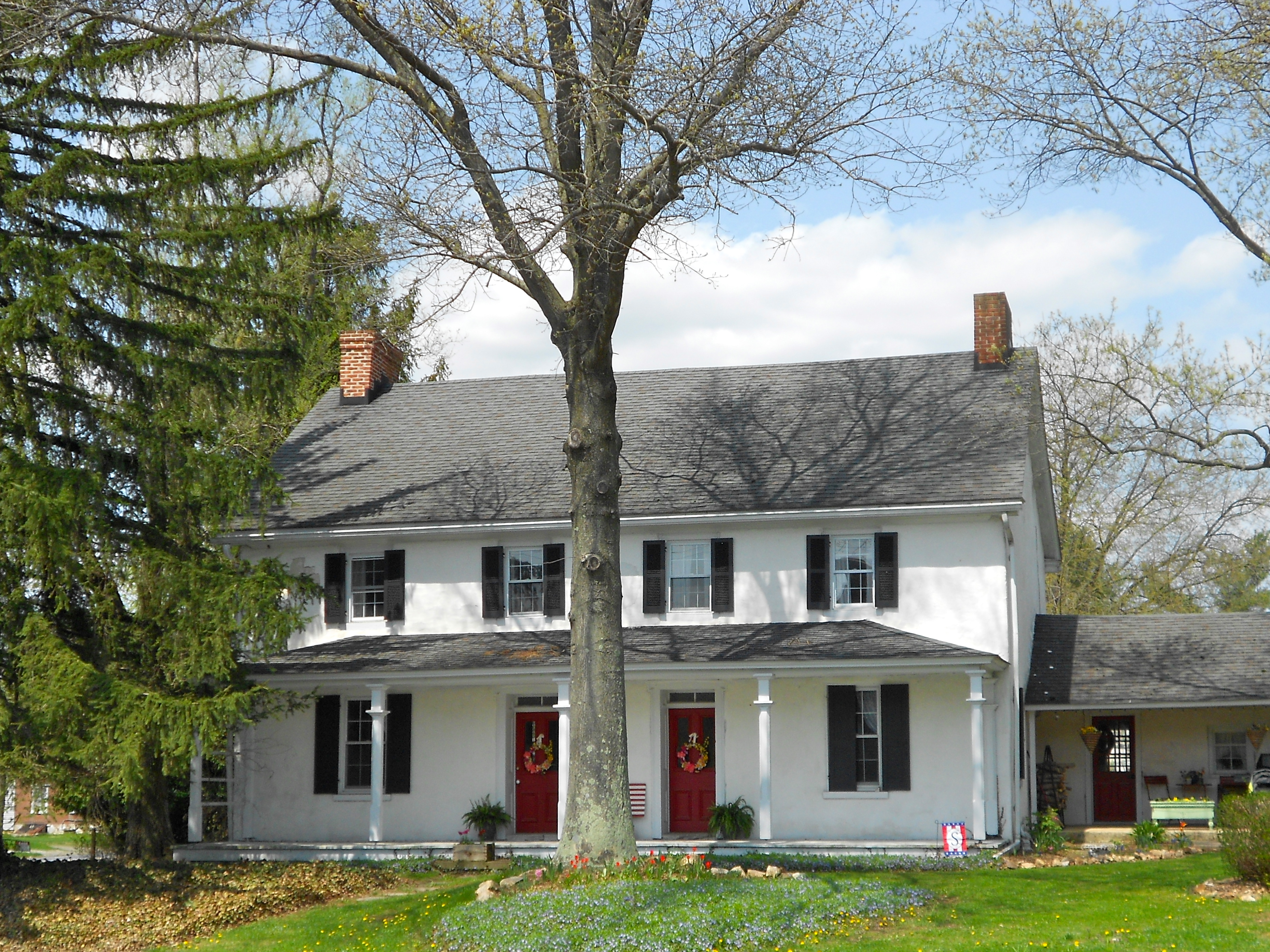
Another house in Kemblesville

Kemblesville is located 15 minutes northwest of Newark, Delaware. While the area remains relatively rural, increasing development pressures are slowly bringing change to the village and its township.

The local ZIP code is 19347.
