= Franklin Township, Chester County, Pennsylvania =

Township in Pennsylvania, US

Franklin Township
- Township
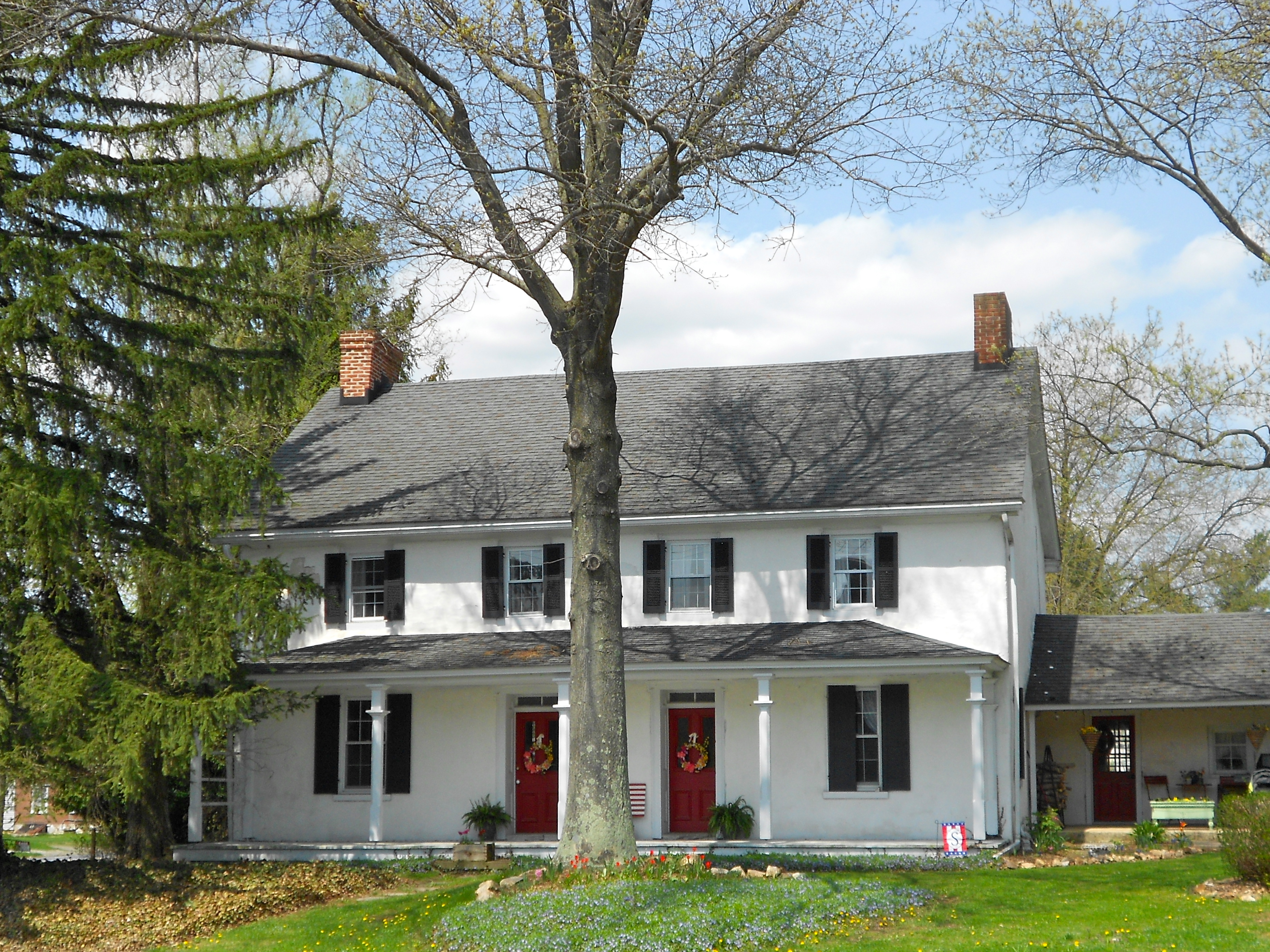
- House in Kemblesville

- Location of Franklin Township in Chester County, Pennsylvania (upper left) and of Chester County in Pennsylvania (lower right)

- Location of Pennsylvania in the United States
- Coordinates: 39°46′14″N 75°49′31″W
- Country: United States
- State: Pennsylvania
- County: Chester
- Chartered: 1723 (as New London Township)
- Founded: 1852

Area
  - Total: 13.14 sq mi (34.04 km^{2})
  - Land: 13.06 sq mi (33.82 km^{2})
  - Water: 0.081 sq mi (0.21 km^{2})
- Elevation: 302 ft (92 m)

Population (2020)
  - Total: 4,433
  - Density: 345.8/sq mi (133.52/km^{2})
- Time zone: UTC-5 (EST)
  - Summer (DST): UTC-4 (EDT)
- Area code: 610
- FIPS code: 42-029-27376
- Website: www.franklintownship.us

Franklin Township is a second-class township in Chester County, Pennsylvania, United States. The population was 4,433 at the 2020 census.

== Geography ==
According to the U.S. Census Bureau, the township has a total area of 13.2 square miles (34 km^{2}), all land.

The mailing addresses for the township include Landenberg, Lincoln University, and Kemblesville. The township abuts Maryland on its southern border, near the Fair Hill equestrian trails and grounds.

== History ==
The southernmost part of the township was originally disputed territory between Pennsylvania and Maryland, resolved eventually by the Mason–Dixon line. The southernmost section of the township formed the northern section of New Munster, a large settlement tract established by Maryland and named after the southern province of Munster in Ireland. New Munster acted as an early genesis point and catalyst for large Scots-Irish settlement and expansion into Chester County and points west in Pennsylvania. The Wooleston Grist Mill, also known as Tweed's Mill or Mackey's Mill, formed part of the New Munster tract and settlement.

Part of the township was in the London Tract, land owned by a business association known as the "London Company" from a land grant by William Penn in 1699. In 1723, the area was part of the newly established New London township, out of which Franklin Township was created in 1852. The township was so named in honor of Benjamin Franklin, who had owned land in the area.

== Demographics ==
Historical population
Census	Pop.	Note	%±
1930	620		—
1940	655		5.6%
1950	666		1.7%
1960	817		22.7%
1970	1,043		27.7%
1980	1,920		84.1%
1990	2,779		44.7%
2000	3,850		38.5%
2010	4,352		13.0%
2020	4,433		1.9%

At the 2010 census, the township was 92.3% non-Hispanic White, 1.9% Black or African American, 0.1% Native American, 1.1% Asian, and 1.6% were two or more races. 6.4% of the population were of Hispanic or Latino ancestry.

At the 2000 census, there were 3,850 people, 1,210 households and 1,038 families living in the township. The population density was 290.7 inhabitants per square mile (112.2/km^{2}). There were 1,237 housing units at an average density of 93.4 per square mile (36.1/km^{2}). The racial makeup of the township was 96.73% White, 1.12% African American, 0.18% Native American, 0.75% Asian, 0.49% from other races, and 0.73% from two or more races. Hispanic or Latino of any race were 1.27% of the population.

There were 1,210 households, of which 53.1% had children under the age of 18 living with them, 77.6% were married couples living together, 5.6% had a female householder with no husband present, and 14.2% were non-families. 10.1% of all households were made up of individuals, and 2.6% had someone living alone who was 65 years of age or older. The average household size was 3.18 and the average family size was 3.45.

34.3% of the population were under the age of 18, 5.4% from 18 to 24, 31.0% from 25 to 44, 24.4% from 45 to 64, and 5.0% who were 65 years of age or older. The median age was 36 years. For every 100 females, there were 99.2 males. For every 100 females age 18 and over, there were 96.8 males.

The median household income was $81,085 and the median family income was $89,718. Males had a median income of $55,208 and females $36,250. The per capita income was $28,057. About 0.6% of families and 1.7% of the population were below the poverty line, including 0.8% of those under age 18 and 2.4% of those age 65 or over.

== Politics ==
United States presidential election results for Franklin Township, Chester County, Pennsylvania
Year	Republican		Democratic		Third party(ies)	
Year	No.	%	No.	%	No.	%
2024	1,456	48.94%	1,483	49.85%	36	1.21%
2020	1,414	48.00%	1,489	50.54%	43	1.46%
2016	1303	50.04%	1127	43.28%	174	6.68%
2012	1353	56.92%	979	41.19%	45	1.89%
2008	1234	51.74%	1135	47.59%	16	0.67%
2004	1195	56.31%	912	42.98%	15	0.71%
2000	957	56.43%	693	40.86%	46	2.71%
1996	615	51.42%	424	35.45%	157	13.13%
1992	226	51.36%	155	35.23%	59	13.41%
1988	628	67.31%	302	32.37%	3	0.32%
1984	578	73.07%	211	26.68%	2	0.25%
1980	472	65.37%	189	26.18%	61	8.45%
1976	323	57.99%	222	39.86%	12	2.15%
1972	332	69.89%	135	28.42%	8	1.68%
1968	208	57.46%	92	25.41%	62	17.13%
1964	196	51.31%	186	48.69%	0	0.00%
1960	236	66.67%	117	33.05%	1	0.28%
1956	188	62.88%	110	36.79%	1	0.33%
1952	163	56.40%	123	42.56%	3	1.04%
1948	125	44.17%	155	54.77%	3	1.06%
1944	133	53.20%	116	46.40%	1	0.40%
1940	156	52.17%	143	47.83%	0	0.00%
1936	191	58.05%	137	41.64%	1	0.30%
1932	120	51.28%	103	44.02%	11	4.70%
1928	183	83.56%	33	15.07%	3	1.37%

Franklin Township is administered by a five-member Board of Supervisors, each of whom serve overlapping six-year terms.

As of January 6, 2026:

Official	Party	Position	First elected	Seat up
Donna Dea	Republican	Chair	2009	2027
Jim Johnston	Republican	Vice Chair	2015	2027
Anteia Consorto	Republican		2025	2031
Nancy Widdoes	Democratic		2025	2031
Dawn Dowling	Democratic		2023	2029

Like most of Chester County, Franklin Township was a Republican Party stronghold throughout the 20th century but has trended Democratic in recent years. In 2019, it elected a Democratic-majority Board of Supervisors. At the 2020 United States Presidential Election, it voted for a Democratic nominee for president for the first time since 1948.

== Transportation ==
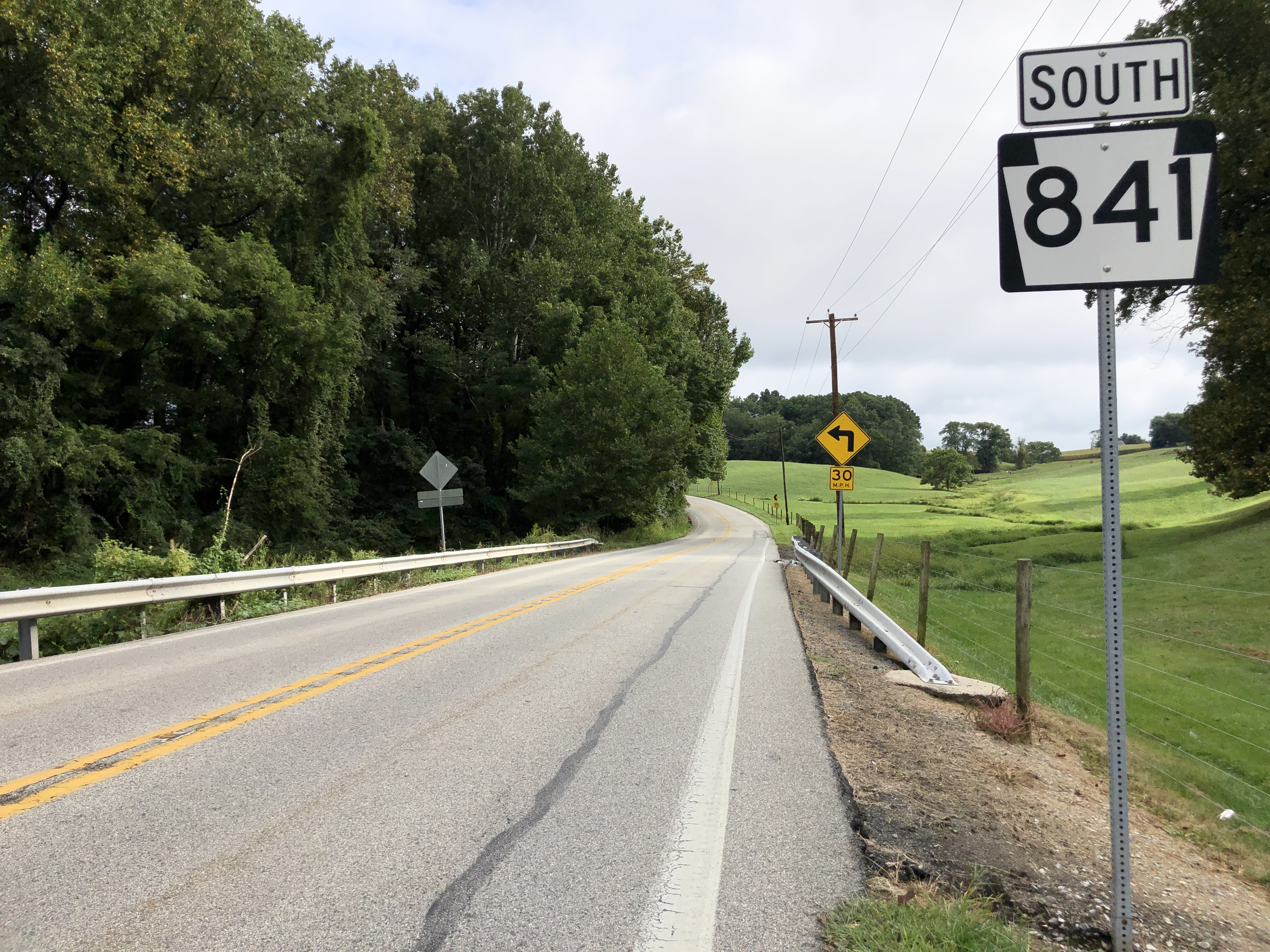
PA 841 northbound in Franklin Township

As of 2020, there were 54.86 miles (88.29 km) of public roads in Franklin Township, of which 16.89 miles (27.18 km) were maintained by the Pennsylvania Department of Transportation (PennDOT) and 37.97 miles (61.11 km) were maintained by the township.

Pennsylvania Route 841 and Pennsylvania Route 896 are the numbered highways serving Franklin Township. PA 841 follows Chesterville Road and Wickerton Road along a southwest-northeast alignment through western, central and northern parts of the township. PA 896 follows New London Road along a northwest-southeast alignment through central portions of the township.
