= Lewisville, Chester County, Pennsylvania =

Unincorporated community in Pennsylvania, US

Lewisville, Pennsylvania
- Unincorporated community
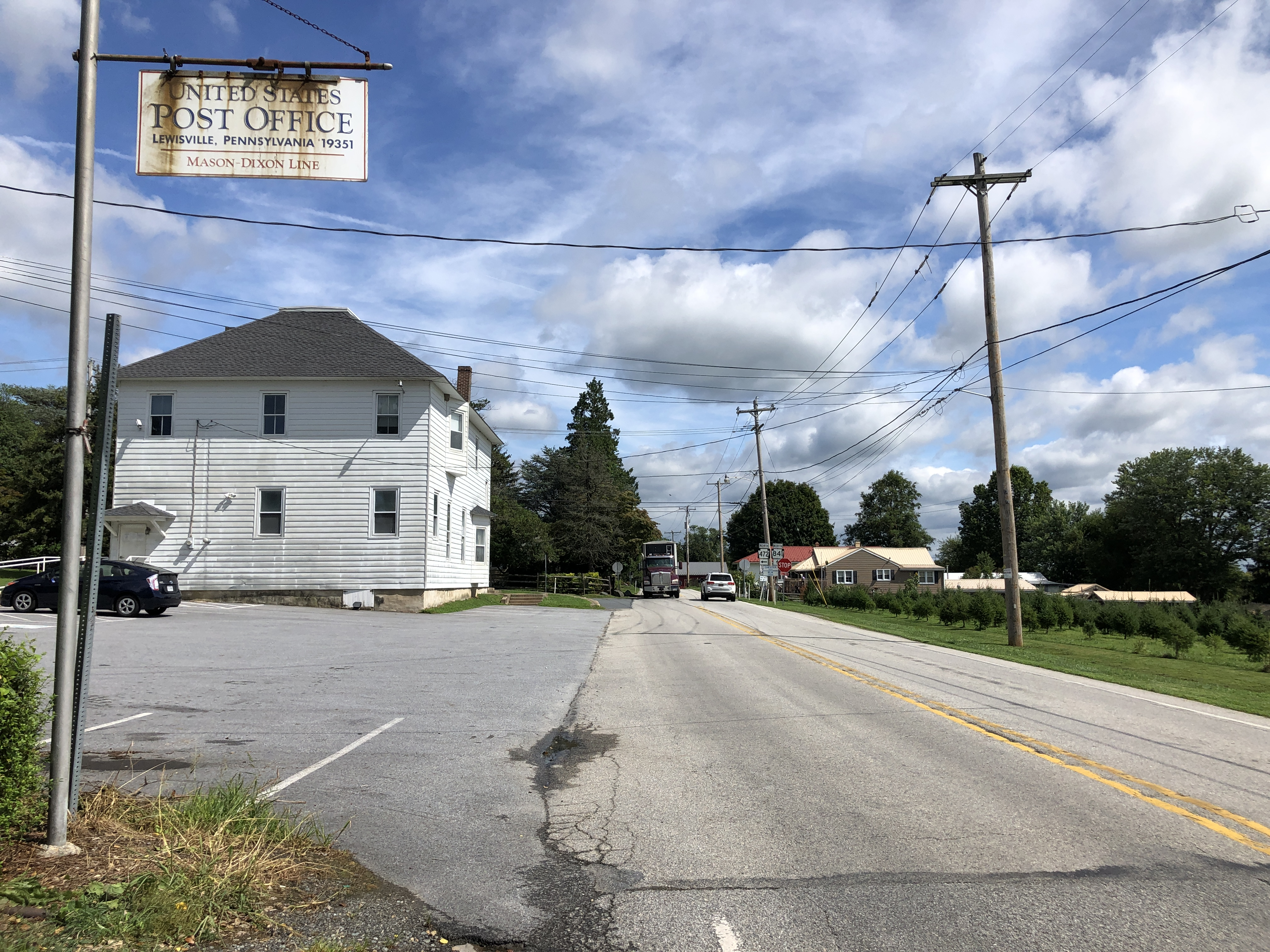
- Northbound PA 841 at the Maryland state line looking into Lewisville

- Location within Pennsylvania Location within the United States
- Coordinates: 39°43′21″N 75°52′30″W
- Country: United States
- State: Pennsylvania
- County: Chester
- Township: Elk
- Elevation: 427 ft (130 m)
- Time zone: UTC-5 (Eastern (EST))
  - Summer (DST): UTC-4 (EDT)
- ZIP code: 19351
- Area codes: 610 and 484
- GNIS feature ID: 1179249

Lewisville is an unincorporated community in Elk Township in Chester County, Pennsylvania, United States. Lewisville is located at the intersection of state routes 472 and 841, just north of the Maryland border.
