= Longwood Gardens =

Botanical garden in Kennett Square, Pennsylvania

- U.S. National Register of Historic Places
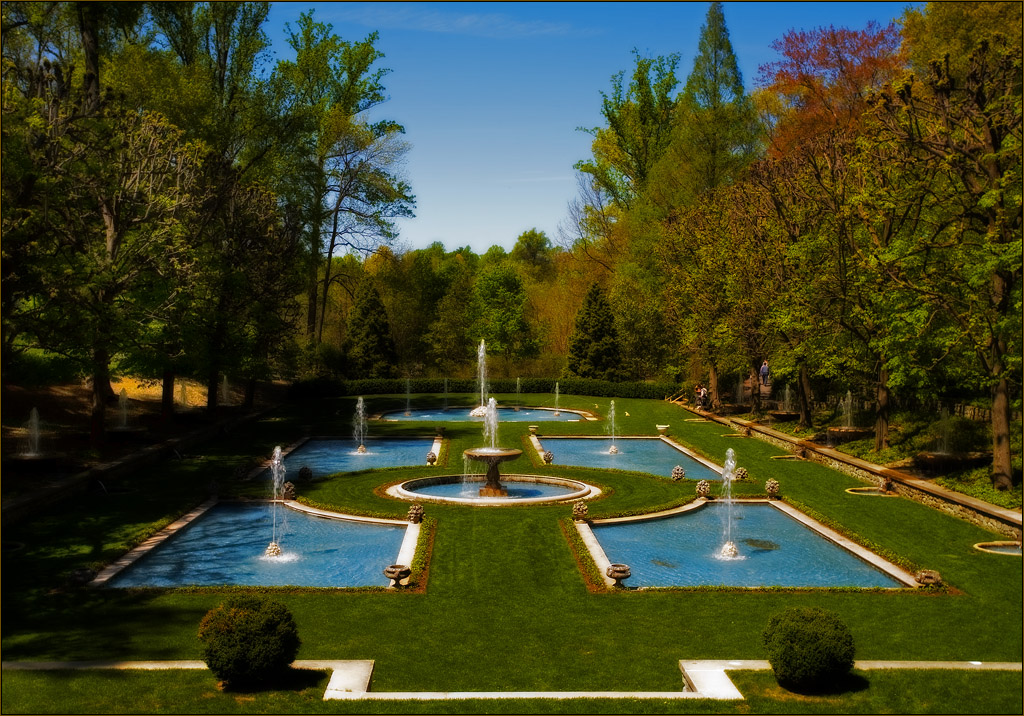
- The Italian Water Garden at Longwood Gardens

- Location within Pennsylvania
- Location: Kennett Square, Pennsylvania, United States
- Coordinates: 39°52′11″N 75°40′43″W
- Area: 1,100 acres (450 ha)
- Visitation: 1.6 million (2023)
- Website: longwoodgardens.org
- NRHP reference No.: 72001105
- Added to NRHP: December 10, 1972

Longwood Gardens is a public garden that consists of more than 1,100 acres (445 hectares; 4.45 km^{2}) of gardens, woodlands, and meadows in the Brandywine Creek Valley in Kennett Square, Pennsylvania, United States. It is one of the premier horticultural display gardens in the United States and is open to visitors year-round to enjoy native and exotic plants and horticulture (both indoor and outdoor), events and performances, seasonal and themed attractions, as well as educational lectures, courses, and workshops.

== History ==
Longwood Gardens has a long, varied history. For thousands of years, the native Lenni Lenape tribe fished its streams, hunted its forests, and planted its fields. Evidence of the tribe's existence is found in quartz spear points that have been discovered on and around the property and can be found on display in the Peirce-du Pont House on the Longwood Gardens property.

In 1700, a Quaker farmer named George Peirce purchased 402 acres (163 ha) of this English-claimed land from William Penn's commissioners. George's son Joshua cleared and farmed the land and in 1730 he built the brick farmhouse that, enlarged, still stands today. In 1798, Joshua's twin grandsons Samuel and Joshua, who had inherited the farm, actively pursued an interest in natural history and began planting an arboretum that eventually covered 15 acres (6.1 ha). The collection included specimens that they collected from the wild as well as plants acquired from some of the region's leading botanists.

By 1850, the arboretum boasted one of the finest collections of trees in the nation and had become a place for the locals to gather outdoors—a new concept that was sweeping America at the time. Community picnics and socials were held at Peirce's Park in the mid to late 19th century. The Pennsylvania guide noted in 1940 that "Longwood received its present name from 'Long Woods,' as the section was known before the Civil War, when black slaves fleeing from the South found shelter in this station on the Underground Railroad, which was supported by Quakers of Kennett Square, Hamorton, and Wilmington, Delaware."

In the early 20th century, the family's heirs lost interest in the property and allowed the arboretum to deteriorate. The farm passed out of the family through several hands in quick succession, and a lumber mill operator was about to cut down the trees for timber in early 1906. This threat moved Pierre S. du Pont, American entrepreneur, businessman, philanthropist, and member of the du Pont family, to take action. On July 20, 1906, 36-year-old du Pont purchased the farm primarily to preserve the trees, in a transaction managed by Isabel Darlington, Chester County's first female lawyer. He was not planning to create Longwood Gardens, but within a few years, his desire to make it a place where he could entertain his friends transformed a simple country farm into one of the country's leading horticultural display gardens.

Pierre du Pont opened the garden to the public in 1921 and in 1937 created the Longwood Foundation, which came under the control of trustees in 1946. When he died in 1954, he "had in place a well-funded yet adaptable mechanism for Longwood to continue." The garden was free, relying solely on its sizable endowment, until 1973, when it began charging admission.

In 2018, Longwood Gardens acquired the historic Longwood Cemetery from its volunteer-run management association. Chartered in 1855, Longwood Cemetery is located just outside of the main Gardens entrance, on Greenwood Road. It lies in front of the historic Longwood Progressive Friends Meeting House, founded by Quaker dissidents in 1854 and acquired by Pierre S. du Pont after it closed in 1940. Bayard Taylor, Eusebius Barnard, and Isaac Mendenhall are among the interments there.

In 2024 Longwood Gardens acquired Granogue, a 505-acre (204 ha) cultural landscape in Wilmington, Delaware and one of the last remaining unprotected pieces of open space in the Brandywine River corridor.

== Current use ==
Today the 1,100-acre (450 ha) Longwood Gardens consists of varied outdoor gardens, ranging from formal to naturalistic in their landscape design. There are 1.6 acres (0.65 ha) of Conservatory gardens under glass, with 13 indoor gardens and 859 different types of permanent plants, as well as fountains. The Gardens also have extensive educational programs including a tuition-free two-year school of professional horticulture, a fellows program, and extensive internships. It hosts hundreds of horticultural and performing arts events each year, from flower shows, gardening demonstrations, courses, and children's programs to concerts, organ and carillon recitals, musical theatre, fountain shows, and fireworks displays. It also hosts an extensive Christmas light display during the holiday season. During the fall foliage and Christmas seasons, the garden features an operating garden railway.

The Gardens have attracted more than one million visitors a year since 2012. Plans for growth and expansion for the next four decades began in 2010 with the hiring of West 8, a Dutch landscape architecture and urban planning firm with headquarters in Rotterdam and an office in New York City. The founder of West 8, Adriaan Geuze, stated their mission is: "to celebrate Longwood, enjoy it, keep it, preserve it, while asking how it could function as a spectacular place for larger groups of people in the 21st century." The comprehensive Longwood plan is now complete and the first major project in the plan, the revitalization of the Main Fountain Garden, began in 2014 and completed in 2017.

== Grounds and fountains ==
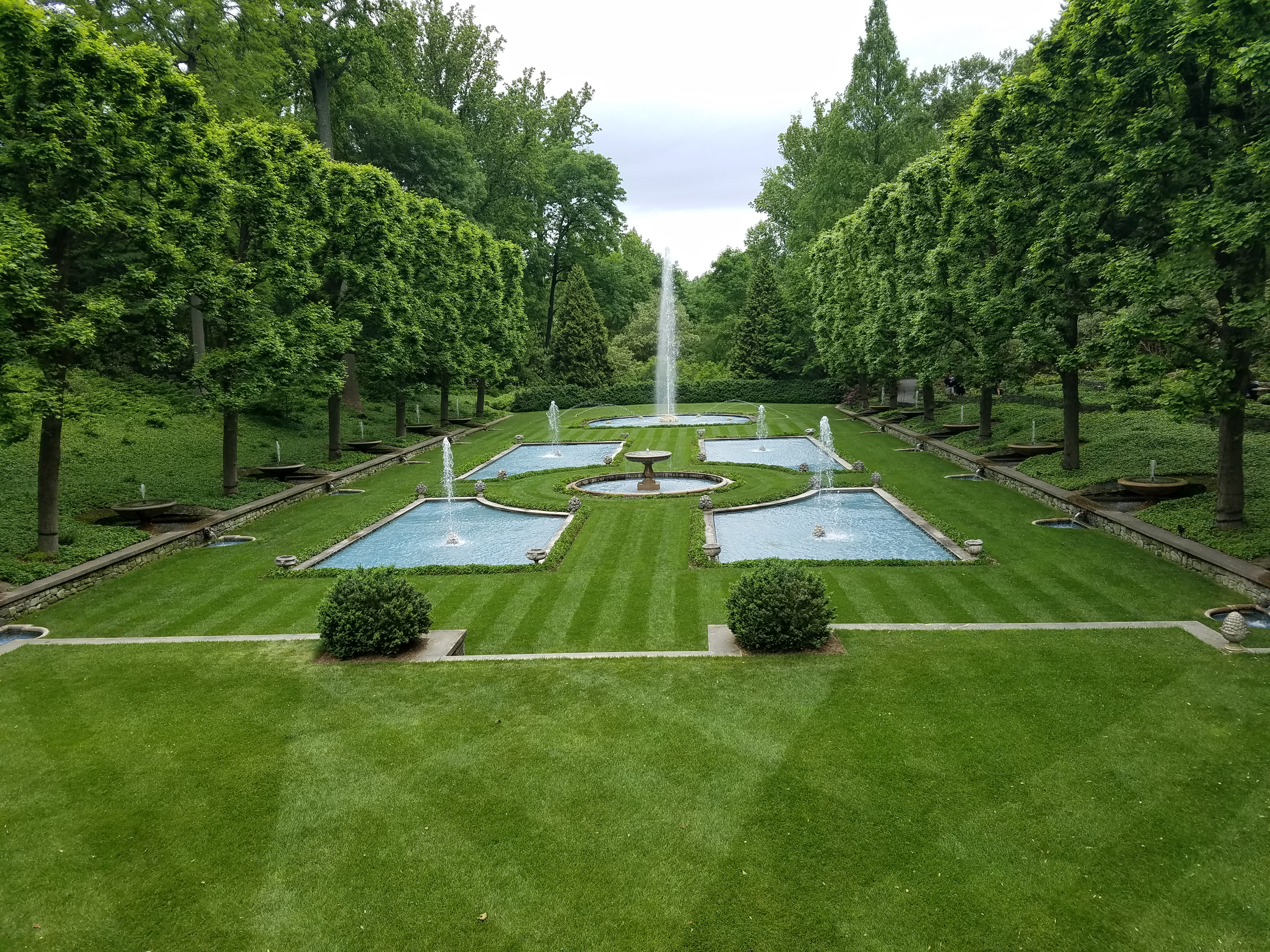
The Italian Water Garden

The development of Longwood as a public garden began in the 1800s with the Peirce family's arboretum. Joshua and Samuel Peirce collected many native and exotic trees, which they planted in straight rows on land east of their farmhouse. Peirce also added a historical marker for Hannah Freeman, purportedly the last surviving member of the Lenape people, who had been born in the area in 1731. This area became known as Peirce's Park toward the end of the 19th century. Visitors to Longwood Gardens today still enjoy Peirce's Park, which is now punctuated by the Sylvan Fountain, added by Pierre S. du Pont in 1925–27.

After Pierre S. du Pont purchased the property in 1906, he began developing the outdoor gardens further, adding the 600-foot long Flower Garden Walk in 1907. The Flower Garden Walk features a pool known as the Round Fountain at the intersection of the main paths. Its simple jet of water was Longwood's first fountain.

In 1914, Pierre S. du Pont added the Open Air Theatre after visits to the Villa Gori in Siena, Italy, provided inspiration.

From 1925 to 1927, du Pont designed and constructed the Italian Water Garden on a site northeast of Longwood's Large Lake, after gaining inspiration from a visit to the Villa Gamberaia, near Florence, Italy.

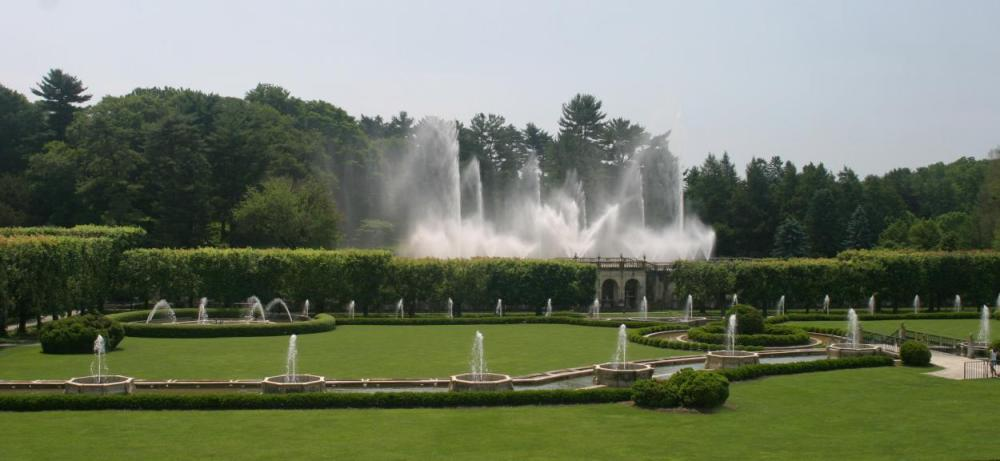
The Main Fountain Garden, prior to the 2014–2017 renovation.

In 1928, du Pont began adding fountains to a garden he had begun developing in 1921. This space, directly south of the Conservatory, would become du Pont's most ambitious project—the 5-acre (2.0 ha) Main Fountain Garden. The Main Fountain Garden "combines Italianate ornamentation and French grandeur with World's Fair showmanship. Like other great fountains, it is an engineering tour de force using the latest technology of the time." The Main Fountain Garden debuted to the public in 1931 and was the last major project in the gardens during du Pont's life.

In 1957, the Waterlily Display opened under the direction of Russell Seibert, who was Longwood's first director after Pierre du Pont's death in 1954.

In the 1970s, landscape architect Thomas Church was engaged to advise Longwood on long-range planning, garden improvement, and visitor circulation. He contributed to many spaces throughout the Gardens, and designed the Theatre Garden (opened in 1975), the Wisteria Garden (opened in 1976), and the Peony Garden (opened in 1976).

By 1977, Thomas Church could no longer visit because of his declining health, and the English designer Sir Peter Shepheard became Longwood's consulting architect. In 1987 he re-worked the original Waterlily Display layout. The re-designed garden opened in 1988.

In 1995, landscape architect W. Gary Smith designed Peirce's Woods as an "art form" garden that brings together the most ornamental characteristics of the eastern deciduous forest. Thousands of native plants were added, including 10,000 rescued from the North Carolina mountains prior to impending highway construction.

In 2014, Longwood Gardens unveiled its new Meadow Garden, an American landscape spanning 86 acres (35 ha) that showcases native plantings. The Meadow Garden is actively propagated with herbaceous perennials and includes other interventions to manage invasive plants, control trees and shrubs, and promote wildlife. The Meadow Garden was designed by Jonathan Alderson of Jonathan Alderson Landscape Architects of Wayne, Pennsylvania. The historic Webb Farmhouse, which has stood on the property since the early 1700s, has been restored and serves as an interpretive center. John Milner Architects of Chadds Ford, Pennsylvania, led the restoration of the farmhouse.

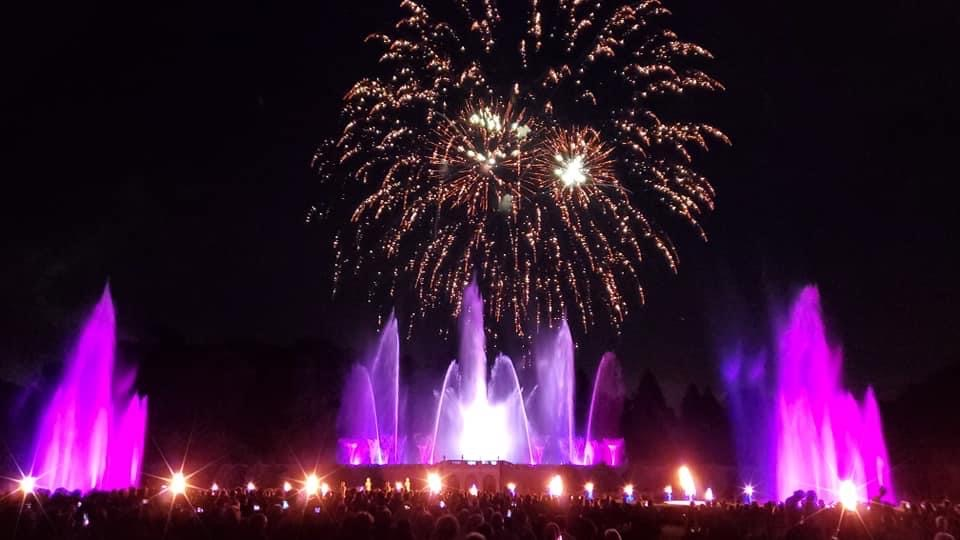
The Main Fountain Garden, post-renovation.

In 2014, under the direction of Paul B. Redman, the gardens embarked on the largest project in its history at the time, the revitalization of its historic Main Fountain Garden. Led by architects Beyer Blinder Belle and Landscape Architects West 8, the Main Fountain Garden re-opened on May 27, 2017.

In 2021, Longwood embarked on Longwood Reimagined: A New Garden Experience, the most ambitious expansion, reimagination, and preservation of Longwood's Conservatory and surrounding landscape in a century. With the November 2024 opening of Longwood Reimagined, new features include the 32,000-square-foot West Conservatory, featuring interior Mediterranean-inspired gardens set amid pools, canals, and fountains; the preservation and relocation of the Cascade Garden—the only design in North America by Roberto Burle Marx—in its own 3,800-square-foot custom glasshouse; a new outdoor Bonsai Courtyard; refreshed Waterlily Court; new 1906 restaurant and The Fountain Room event space overlooking the Main Fountain Garden; new central hub with studios, a library, and staff offices called The Grove; and a preserved and expanded Orchid House.

Outdoor gardens and garden features include: Birdhouse Treehouse, Canopy Cathedral Treehouse, Chimes Tower and Waterfall, Cow Lot, East Conservatory Plaza, Flower Garden Drive, Flower Garden Walk, Forest Walk, Hillside Garden, Idea Garden, Italian Water Garden, Large and Small Lake, Lookout Loft Treehouse, Natural Areas, Main Fountain Garden, Meadow Garden, Ornamental Kitchen Garden, Oak and Conifer Knoll, Peirce's Park, Peirce's Woods, Peony Garden, Rose Arbor, Rose Garden, Student Exhibition Garden, Theatre Garden, Topiary Garden, Waterlily Display, and Wisteria Gardens.

There are more than 750 acres (300 hectares) of natural areas that surround Longwood's formal gardens. Composed of more than 200 distinct plant communities and part of the Mid-Atlantic Piedmont, Longwood's natural areas include mature and regenerating forests, reforestation plantings, native tall-grass and forb meadows, wetlands, and streams. The care of these natural areas prioritizes long-term health and native biodiversity using adaptive management and scientific research.

== Conservatory ==
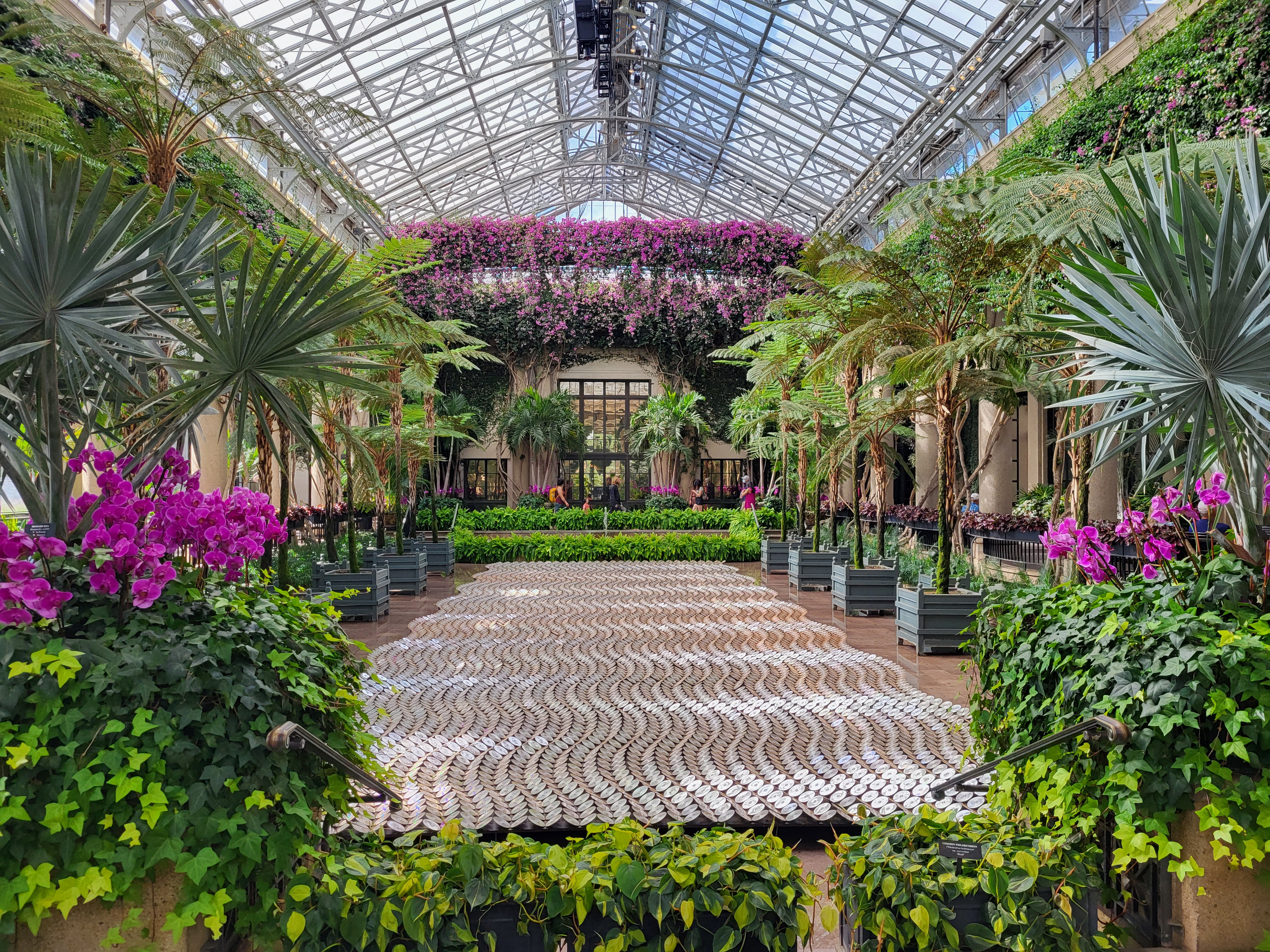
Indoor hall in the summer of 2022

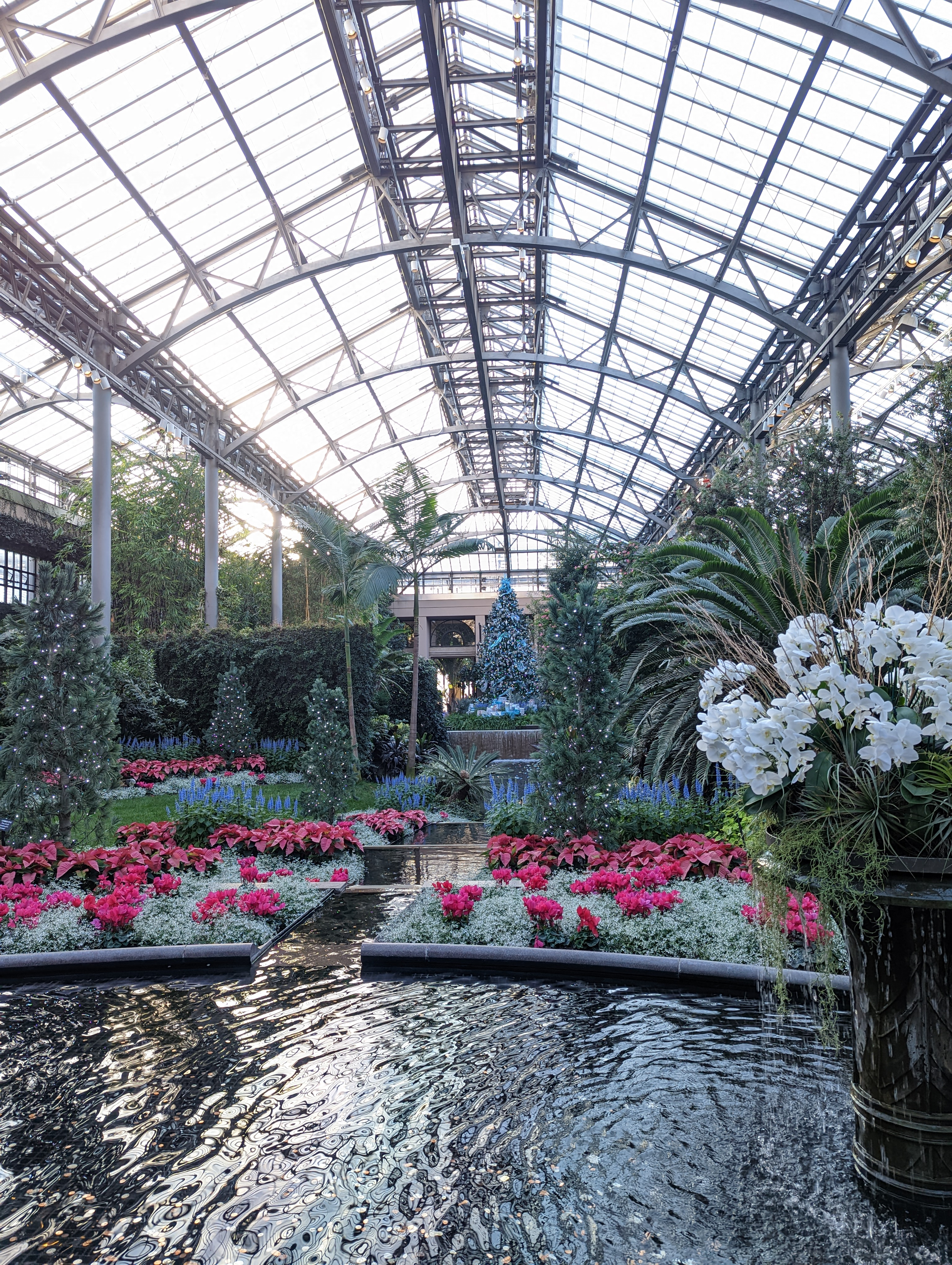
Indoor hall in the winter of 2022

Longwood's first conservatory was built in 1914 when Pierre S. du Pont added an L-shaped extension to the original Peirce farmhouse, doubling its size. A conservatory connected the old and new wings.

Longwood's second and largest conservatory, opened in 1921, is home to 4,600 types of plants and trees. Since its original construction began in 1919, it has undergone expansions and renovations. On Palm Sunday in 1966, the Palm House opened. This space was designed by Victorine and Samuel Homsey. The Palm House was closed in 2021 in preparation for Longwood Reimagined. In 1989, the new Silver Garden opened. This garden was designed by Isabelle Greene, and is meant to evoke the feeling of a dry desert stream bed.

In 1988, Roberto Burle Marx was asked to redesign the former Desert House in the Conservatory. Brazilian Burle Marx was one of the most celebrated landscape designers of the 20th century, and he had already visited and lectured at Longwood several times. The new garden was named the Cascade Garden and it opened in June 1992. The Cascade Garden was preserved and moved to its own custom-built glasshouse as part of Longwood Reimagined: A New Garden Experience.

In 1993, the 100-foot-long Mediterranean Garden opened in the Conservatory, designed by Ron Lutsko Jr. The Mediterranean Garden was closed in 2021 in preparation for Longwood Reimagined.

In January 2003, the East Conservatory was closed for renovation and redesign, with the main hall reopening to the public on October 29, 2005.

In 2007, a much larger Indoor Children's Garden was opened in the Conservatory, replacing a small children's garden that had been housed in the Conservatory since the 1980s. In 2010, an indoor green wall, designed by British landscape architect Kim Wilkie was added to the Conservatory. This green wall contains 47,000 plants and was the largest green wall in North America when it opened. The Green Wall, which is the entrance way for a series of bathrooms, was voted America's Best Restroom in 2014.

Main Conservatory gardens include: Acacia Passage, Camellia House, East Conservatory, Exhibition Hall, Garden Path, Green Wall, Indoor Children's Garden, Orangery, Orchid House, and Silver Garden.

== Peirce-du Pont House ==
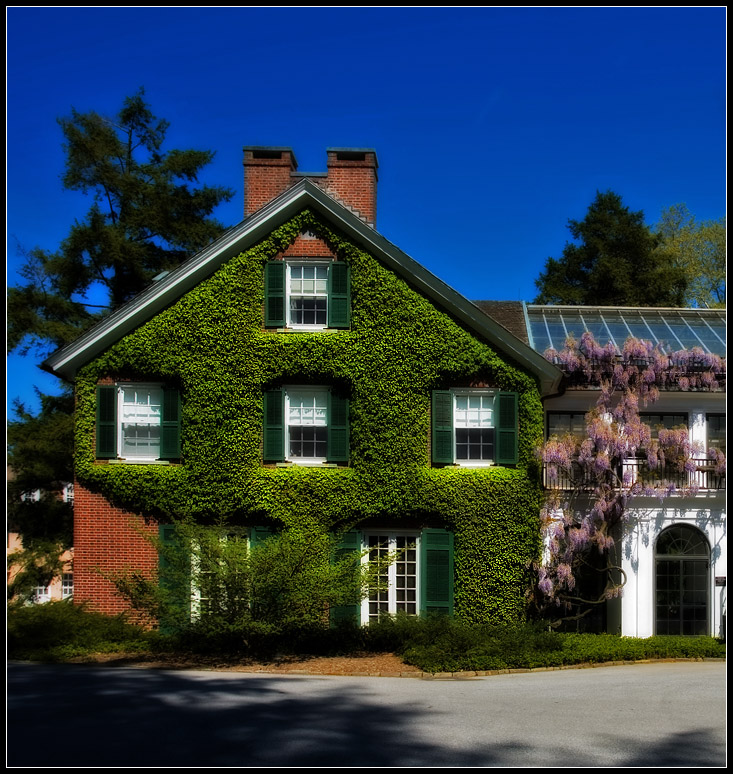
The Peirce-du Pont House

The Peirce-du Pont House dates from 1730 and is the oldest building at Longwood Gardens. It was the family homestead of the Peirce family until 1905 and then became the weekend residence of Pierre du Pont from 1906 until his death in 1954. It is now open to the public every day of the year and is included with general admission to the gardens.

This spacious country home resulted from five major periods of construction covering nearly 200 years. The original two-story brick farmhouse was built by Joshua Peirce in 1730 to replace a log cabin built in 1709. The brick pattern was Flemish bond brickwork with dark glazed headers and unglazed stretchers. The roof had a simple cornice and pent eaves protected the first floor windows and doors. In 1764, a two-story addition was made to the east end of the house and included a new dining room. The house was enlarged in 1824 adding a large addition to the north of the original structure. This building campaign doubled the size of the Peirce's house. In 1909, Pierre du Pont modernized the house with a two-story addition to the north. Plumbing, electricity, and heating were added throughout the house.

The largest addition was built by du Pont in 1914 when a mirror image of the original farmhouse was added to the north. At the same time, the two wings were connected by Longwood's first conservatory.

After Pierre du Pont's death in 1954, the 1914 rooms were converted into administrative offices. Many of du Pont's possessions were distributed to the du Pont family, although his garden books were retained and form the basis for Longwood's horticultural library. Du Pont's other books and his personal papers were transferred to what has become the Hagley Museum and Library near Wilmington, DE.

The Heritage Exhibit details Longwood's historical and horticultural legacy. It draws upon the extensive photographic and manuscript resources now stored at the Hagley Museum and Library to show the entire 300-year history of the property. Although the rooms housing the exhibit no longer appear residential, their architectural features have been preserved intact and are visible to visitors, as are photos in many rooms showing the decor during du Pont's occupancy.

== Plant collections ==
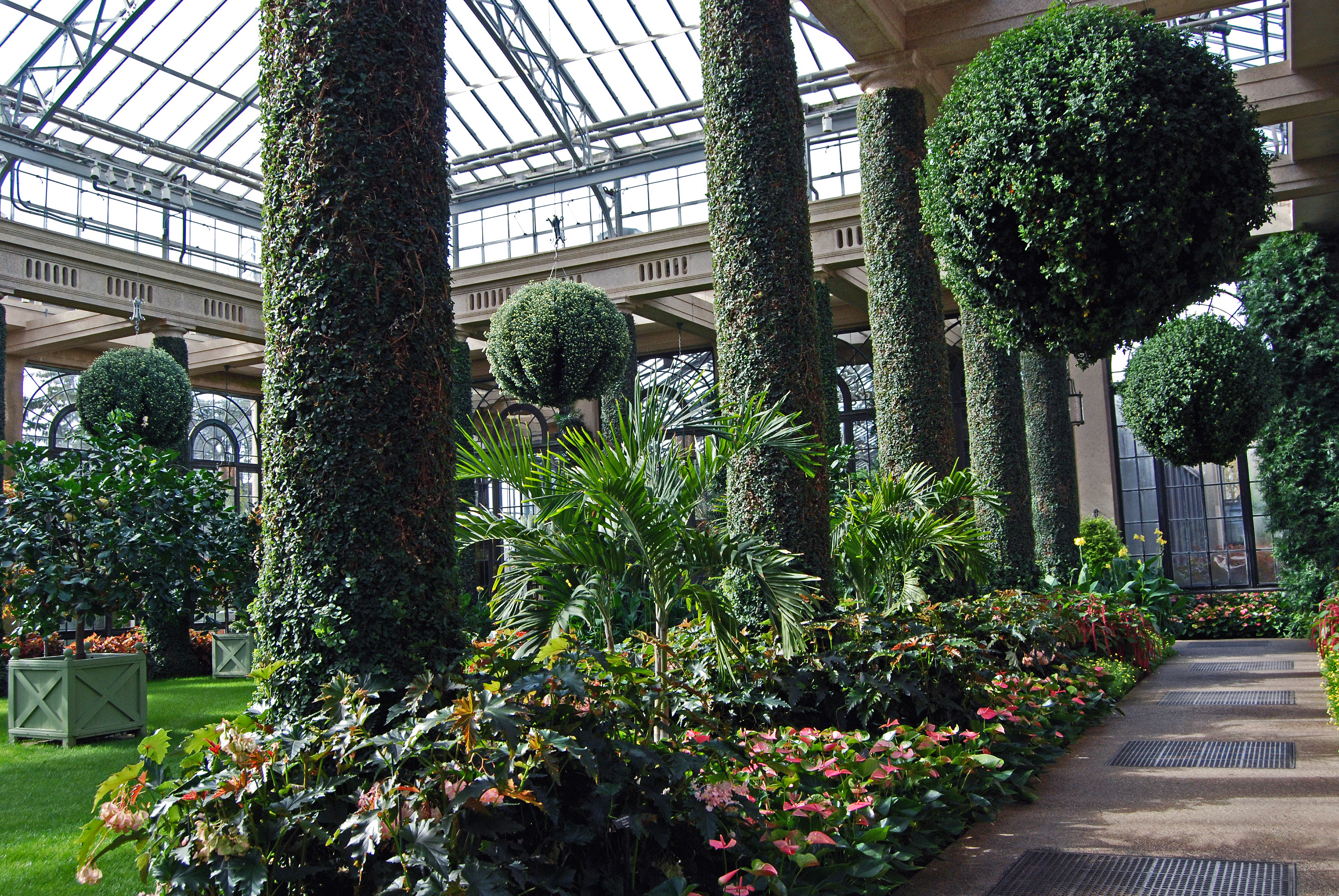
The orangery

Longwood's plant collections contain more than 13,500 taxa. Of those, Longwood has twelve core collections that are central to the mission of Longwood Gardens, and each core collection has a plan for its development, management, and display—devised and periodically reviewed Currently, four of the core collections are accredited by the American Public Gardens Association Plant Collection Network: Buxus, Chrysanthemum, Nymphaea, and Peirce's trees. Legacy collections of Longwood Gardens are plant categories with specific uses that are integral to the historic display aesthetic of the Gardens. Additionally, Longwood Gardens is a Level IV ArbNet Accredited Arboretum and a member of the Botanic Gardens Conservation International.

Core Collections include:

- Boxwood (Buxus): This collection maintains genetic diversity not captured in any other boxwood collection of its kind.
- Chrysanthemum (Chrysanthemum): The Chrysanthemum Collection includes historic Asian (primarily Japanese) cultivars of the genus used for bonsai, cascade, doll, and thousand bloom cultivation techniques and represents one of the largest collections of its kind.
- Peirce's Trees: The first of its kind, the Peirce's Trees Collection includes trees originally found in Peirce's Park and are examples of trees cultivated in the Philadelphia region during the 19th century.
- Waterlily (Nymphaea): The Waterlily Collection includes horticultural selections of the genus Nymphaea developed by North American breeders during the 19th, 20th, and 21st centuries.
- Bonsai: The Bonsai Collection at Longwood Gardens began in 1959 with a purchase of 13 trees from Yuji Yoshimura and, since that time, six curators have stewarded the collection and offered the necessary horticultural skills to continue the bonsai training. A recent donation from The Kennett Collection has led to the current collection that consists of more than 150 trees, 14 styles, and 14 plants from notable masters.
- Camellia (Camellia): The Camellia Collection includes species and cultivated selections of camellia hardy in the greater Philadelphia region. The collection maintains an active breeding program dedicated to producing hybrids with increased cold tolerance using selected accessions from evaluation plots.
- Magnolia (Magnolia): The Magnolia Collection includes species and horticultural selections of the genus Magnolia native to eastern North America.
- Oak (Quercus): The Oak Collection includes species and horticultural selections of the genus Quercus, native to eastern North America.
- Orchids: Orchids were a favorite plant group of Pierre S. and Alice du Pont—both founding members of the American Orchid Society. There are more than 4,500 orchid plants in the collection representing 2,500 taxa. A rotating selection of orchids is on display in Longwood's Orchid House.
  - Historical Cattleya Hybrids and Cultivars: The collection comprises historical (primarily pre-1950) hybrid and cultivar selections, many of which have become rare in commercial horticulture.
  - Disa: Longwood Gardens was the first institution to flower Disa uniflora in the United States. Longwood's collection is one of the only collections of this genus at a public garden in the US.
  - US Native Orchids: This collection comprises endangered, rare, or threatened native species from Pennsylvania or the mid-Atlantic region. Plants are obtained through seed propagation and cultivation research. Select taxa were featured at the 2024 Chelsea Flower Show.
- Plants of Conservation Value: This core collection consists of plants that are rare, threatened, or endangered based on International Union for Conservation of Nature (IUCN) Red List or NatureServe criteria. These plants are located in Longwood's gardens, meadows, conservatories, or research greenhouses and represent plants grown for research, restoration, and display purposes. Examples of these plants found in the public garden areas include Hamamelis ovalis and Polemonium vanbruntiae.
- Rhododendron and Deciduous Azalea (Rhododendron): This collection focuses on the acquisition and evaluation of US native deciduous azalea species and their hybrids along with a diversity of evergreen rhododendrons.
- Water-platter (Victoria): This collection includes both species of the genus Victoria from documented wild origin or their progeny, and the hybrid (‘Longwood Hybrid’), which was first developed and is continually maintained at Longwood Gardens. Germplasm from this collection is distributed on a yearly basis to other botanical institutions, giving the collection a leading role in modern, world-wide Victoria conservation efforts.

Legacy Collections are plant categories with specific uses that are integral to the historic display aesthetic of Longwood Gardens.

Legacy Collections include:

- Clivia: The Clivia Collection represents the results of nearly 50 years of breeding work. The Clivia Breeding Program started in 1976 with the goal of producing a superior yellow-flowered clivia.
- Holly: The Holly Collection includes native species, cultivars, and hybrids of the genus Ilex. Hollies feature prominently throughout the Gardens and natural lands. Three cultivars, Ilex × attenuata ‘Longwood Gold’, Ilex opaca ‘Longwood Gardens’, and Ilex serrata ‘Longwood Firefall’ were selected at Longwood Gardens and will be maintained in perpetuity.
- Iconic Floriculture: This collection includes plants that are technically difficult to grow and an essential part of Longwood's seasonal displays. Examples of these include Plectranthus thyrsoideus, Echium candicans 'Select Blue', Echium wildpretii, Geranium maderense, and Allamanda cathartica ‘Hendersonii.’
- Iconic Garden and Conservatory Plants: This collection includes species and cultivars that are held only at Longwood Gardens, along with plants that are an essential part of Longwood's permanent Conservatory display, difficult to obtain commercially, and are of conservation value. Examples of these include Amorphophallus titanum, Encephalartos woodii, and Citrus 'Oroblanco'.

== Education programs ==
Longwood offers continuing education for both beginning and professional gardeners in the areas of horticulture and gardening, landscape design, creative arts, floral design, and conservation and stewardship. It provides free K-12 programs for students and educators that are tied to Next Generation Science Standards, and its high school offerings focus on such topics as environmental stewardship, biodiversity, and plant propagation. It also offers free self-guided and educator-guided field trips designed for pre-K through grade 12 students.

Programs include internships for U.S. students in 16 areas of specialization: arboriculture, conservatory management, display design, education, greenhouse production, guest engagement and visitor programs, horticulture research, integrated pest management, library and information services, marketing and public relations, natural lands management, nursery management, outdoor display, performing arts, plant records management, and turf management. Internships for international students are offered in the areas of education, library science, marketing and public relations, and ornamental horticulture.

For those pursuing a career in horticulture, Longwood offers a two-year, tuition-free Professional Horticulture Program. The Longwood Fellows Program is a 13-month residential and working experience that helps refine the skill level and heighten the self-awareness of leaders within public horticulture.

== Science at Longwood ==
Since the 1950s, Longwood has advanced scientific understanding of the natural world, with a particular focus on preserving plant diversity, curating plant collections, developing innovative techniques for growing plants, maintaining healthy ecosystems, and continuing to study, refine, and maintain healthy soils.

== Performing arts ==
Longwood's history as a performing arts venue coincides with the early history of the gardens. The first of Pierre S. du Pont's formal Gardens, the Flower Garden Walk, inspired him to host garden parties that often featured musical entertainment and fireworks.

Du Pont debuted his Open Air Theatre at such a garden party in 1914. By 1915, he had installed simple fountains in the stage floor, based on the Villa Gori theater he had visited in Italy. The Theatre was expanded in 1927 to include illuminated fountains in the stage floor and a 10-foot water curtain at its front. The 1,500-seat Open Air Theatre marked its 100th anniversary in 2014, having hosted more than 1,500 performances over the years, including theater troupes, Broadway-style musicals pageants, choruses, and the United States Marine Band. It continues to serve as a venue for summer performances.

In addition to using the Open Air Theatre, Longwood has experimented with a variety of performances in outdoor gardens—Indian sitar music set in the Italian Water Garden, Shakespearean theater staged on the Main Fountain Garden balcony, and modern dance choreographed for Peirce's Park.

Longwood's performance schedule expanded over time to become year-round, made possible by its indoor venues—the Ballroom and Exhibition Hall, both in the Conservatory. The Ballroom re-opened in October 2005 after extensive renovations. It was originally constructed in 1929 to house Longwood's pipe organ and to serve as a venue for concerts, lectures, and dinners, a tradition that continues today. The Ballroom is architecturally unique for its parquet floor, fabric-paneled walls, and ceiling made of 1,104 panes of rose-colored etched glass.

The Exhibition Hall has hosted hundreds of performing artists, including the Meyer Davis dance band, Metropolitan Opera sopranos, John Philip Sousa, and South African vocal groups. The bougainvillea trained on the pillars and walls is the original planting from the 1920s. Once used by the du Ponts for dances and dinner parties, the sunken marble floor is typically flooded with a few inches of water to reflect seasonal displays. The floor is periodically drained to continue the tradition of hosting performances and events in this space.

=== Organ ===
The resident Longwood Organ is a 10,010 pipe instrument designed by Longwood organist-in-residence Firmin Swinnen, a Belgian musician who moved to the US in 1916 and became a prominent theater organist in New York City. The organ's pipes filled fourteen railway freight cars, and they needed a 72-horsepower (54 kW) blower motor to supply the wind pressure; the instrument was the largest pipe organ ever installed in a private residence. Pierre du Pont ordered this massive Aeolian organ in 1929 to replace the previous organ of 3,650 pipes, which he donated to the University of Delaware where it stayed until 1964. The four-manual organ plays into the Longwood ballroom and can be heard throughout the Conservatory when adjoining window panels are opened. Its pipes may be viewed from the rear through glass panels in Longwood's organ museum. The Longwood Organ underwent a restoration that began in 2004 and was completed in January 2011. The Longwood Gardens International Organ Competition welcomes the organ world's brightest young talents to compete on the Longwood Organ for the largest cash prize of any organ competition in the world.

== Carillon ==
In 1929, Pierre du Pont constructed Longwood's 61-foot-tall stone Chimes Tower based on a similar structure he had seen in France. He purchased the largest set of tower chimes he could find from the J.C. Deagan Company of Chicago after first borrowing one chime to test its carrying power. Twenty-five tubular chimes were installed in the upper tower chamber and du Pont installed a switch in the Peirce-du Pont House so he could activate the chimes from his residence. These were replaced by an electronic carillon in 1956, and finally by a 62-cast-bell Eijsbouts carillon from the Netherlands installed in 2001.

Visitors also enjoy live concerts in the summer and fall.

== Seasonal attractions ==
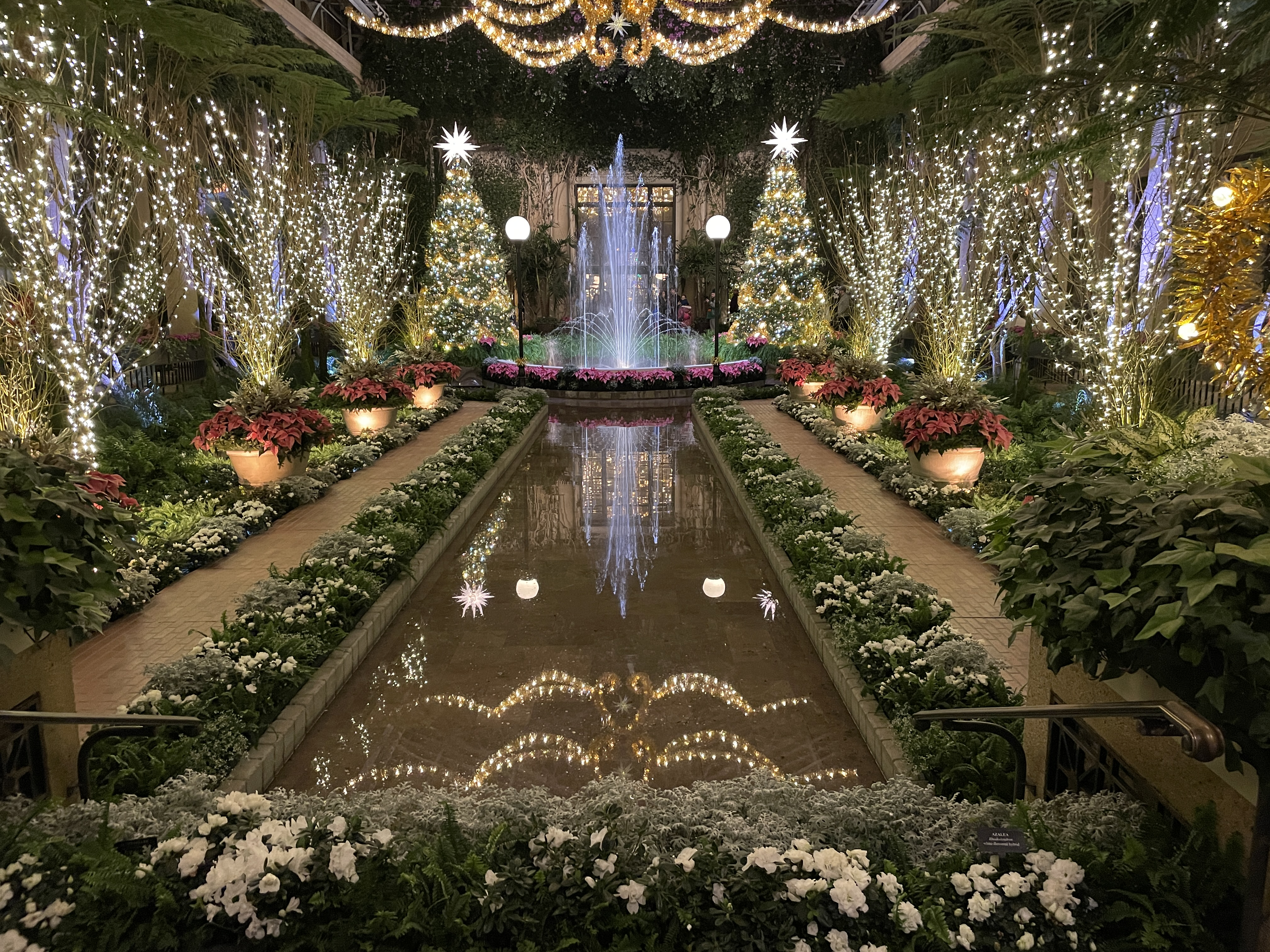
Longwood Gardens Conservatory at Christmas

While there are many art and music events at Longwood Gardens throughout the year, there are five major periods of time where the entire gardens have an overarching theme. Those five themes and their approximate dates are:

- Winter Wonder – starts mid-January
- Spring Blooms – starts at the beginning of April
- Festival of Fountains – starts early May through October
- Autumn's Colors – starts in early September and finishes with the Chrysanthemum festival
- A Longwood Christmas – starts prior to Thanksgiving and finishes the first week of January

== Waterlily Court ==
One of the six waterlily pools in the Waterlily Court

The Waterlily Court at Longwood features six pools, one large center circular pool surrounded by five rectangular pools, and contains around 100 varieties of tropical and hardy waterlilies, lotus plants, and water-platters. The water in the pools is dyed obsidian to create a mirror-like surface reflection in water features. The waterlilies bloom from May through October.

Waterlily Court first opened in 1957 but was later redesigned in 1989 by Peter Shepheard.

== Gallery ==
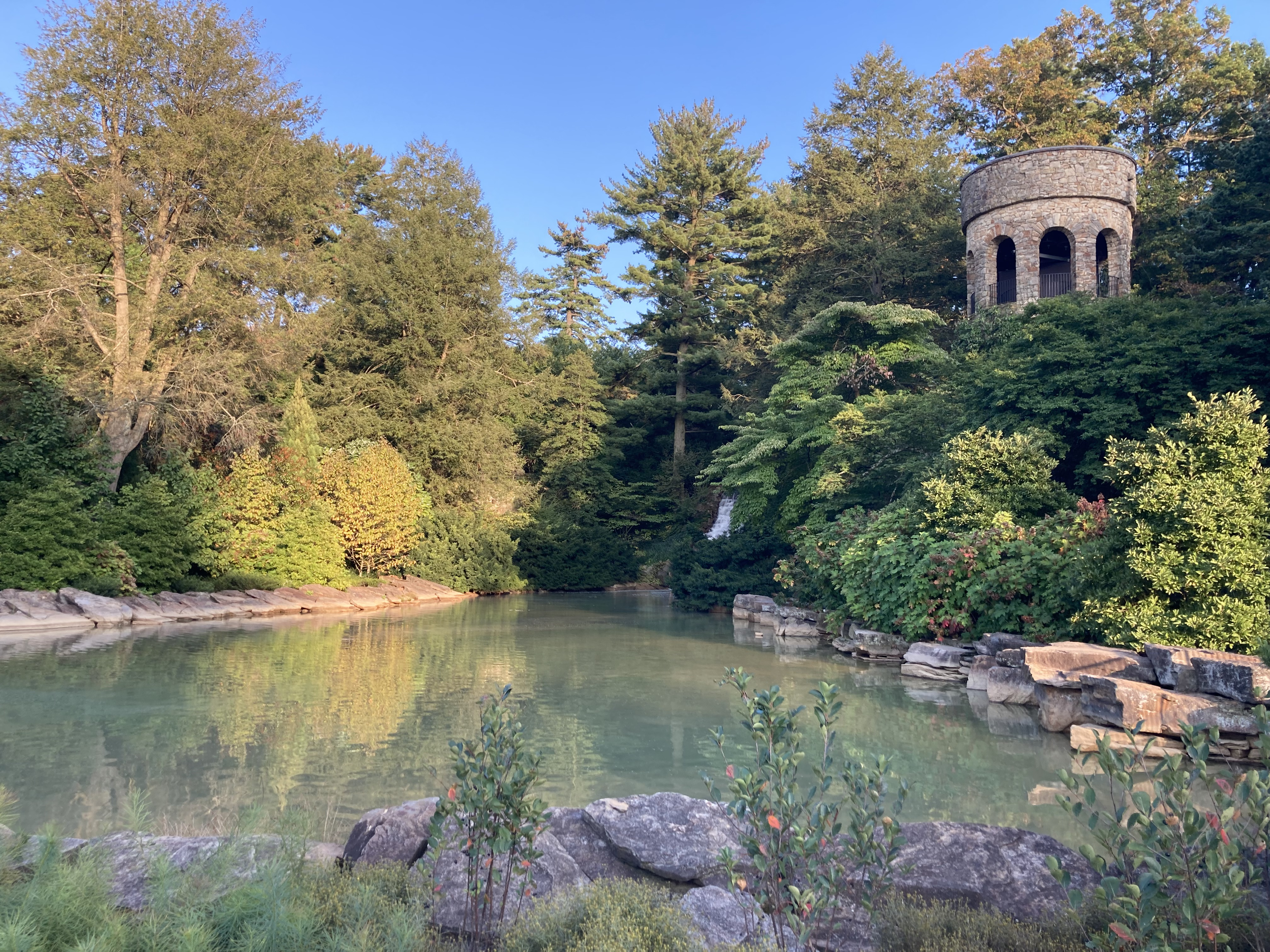
Chimes Tower District in Longwood Gardens

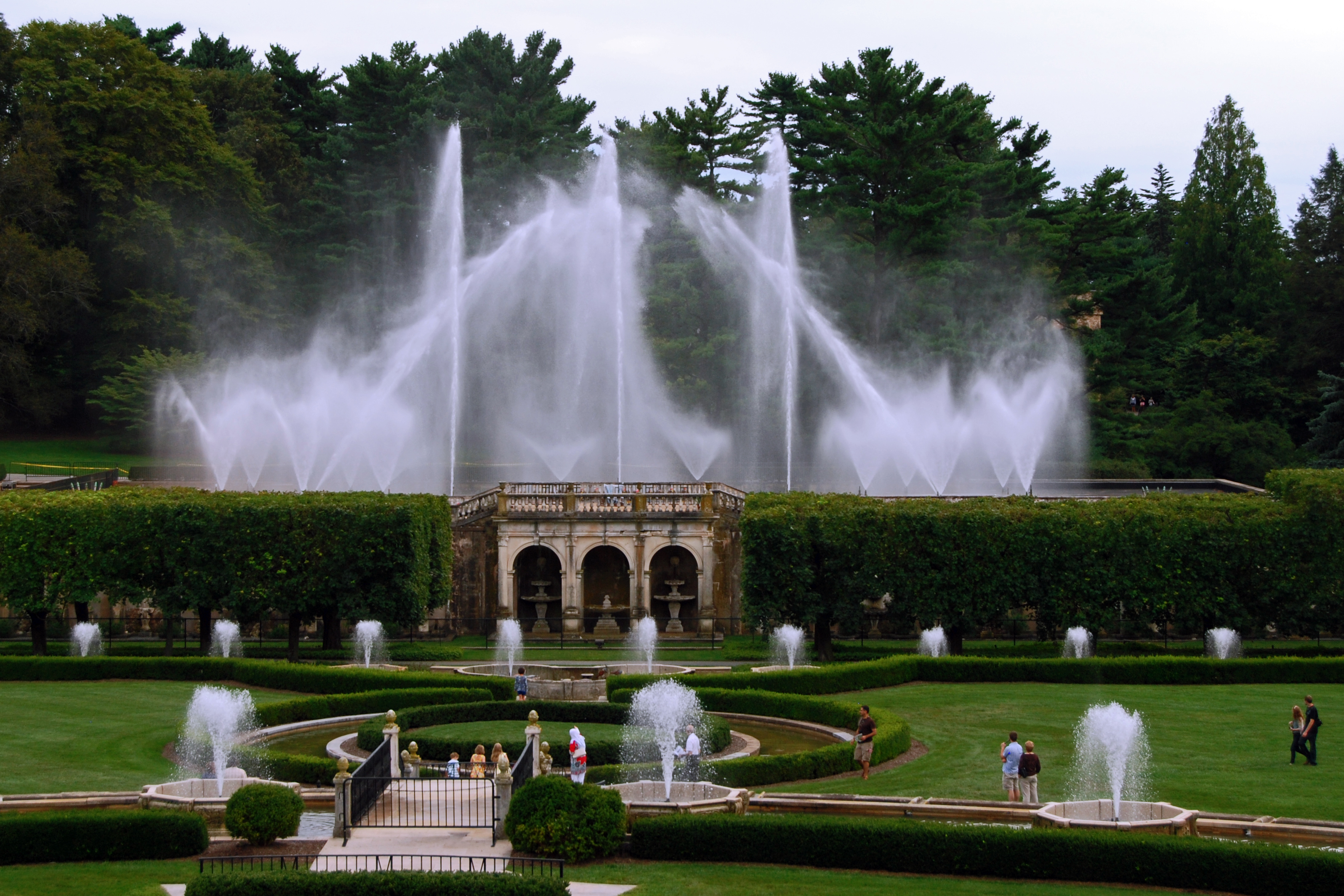
Main Fountain Garden prior to the renovation

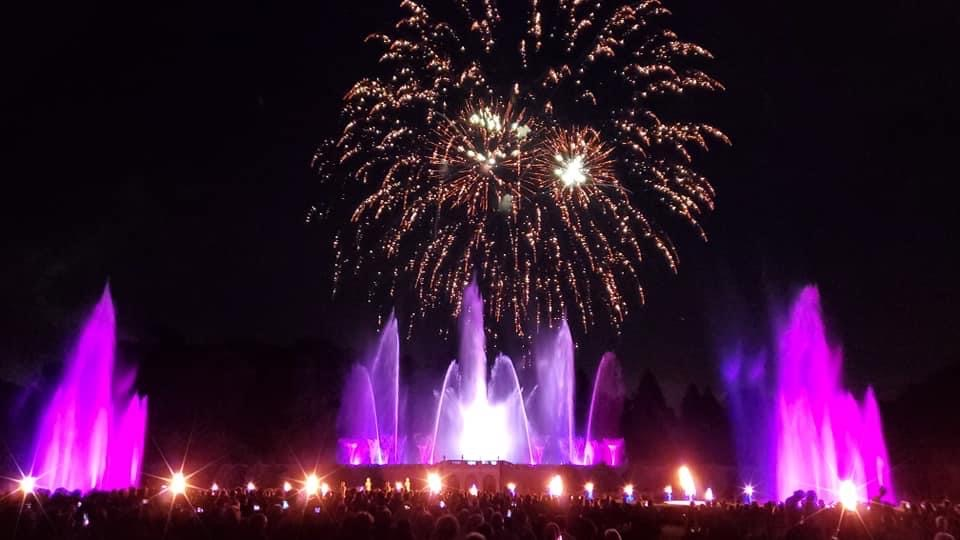
Main Fountain Garden, post-renovation. Also shown is the recurring "Fireworks & Fountains" show.

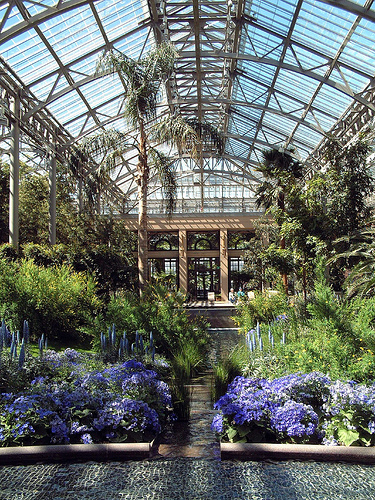
East Conservatory, Longwood Gardens

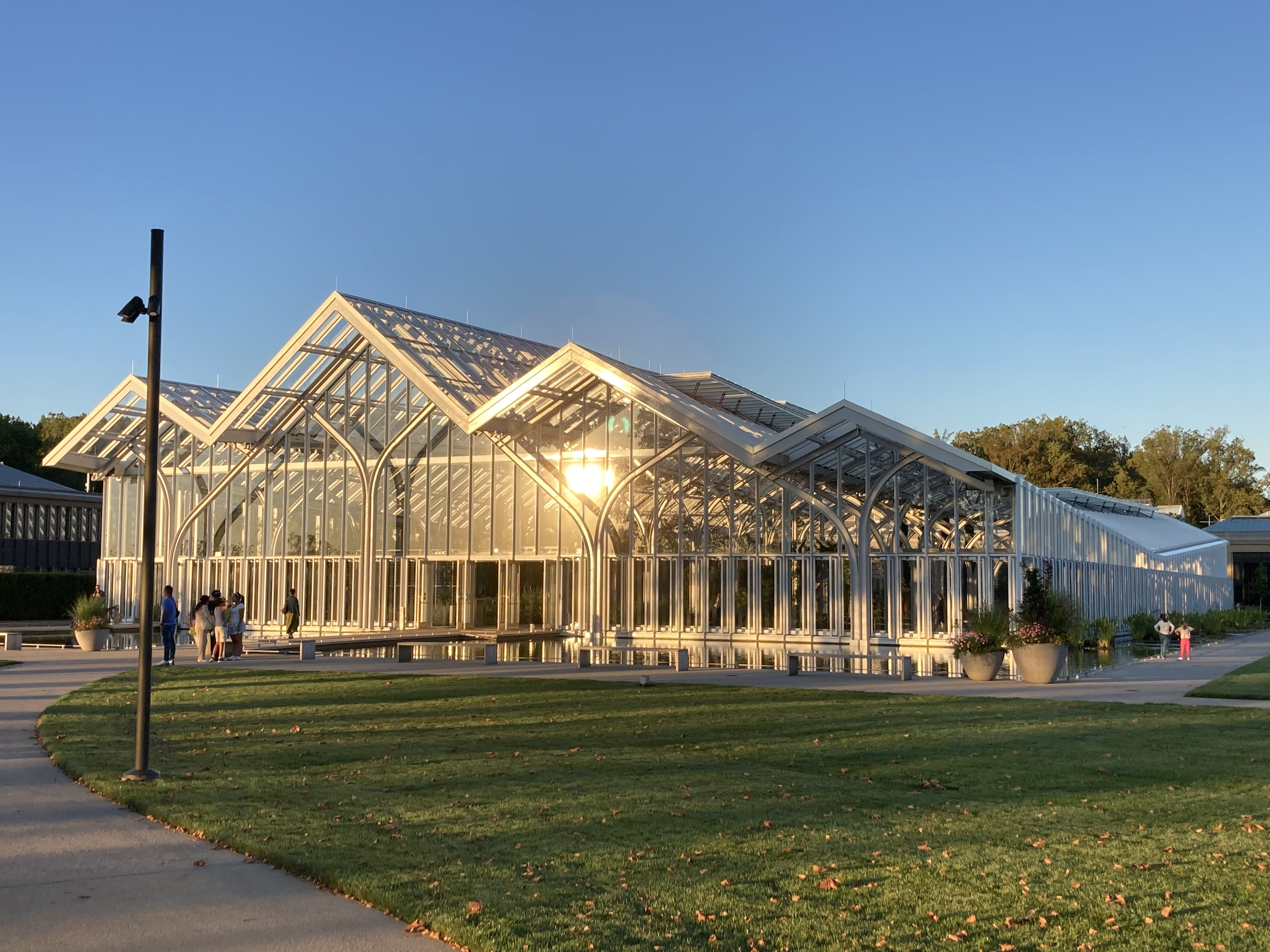
West Conservatory, Longwood Gardens, 2025

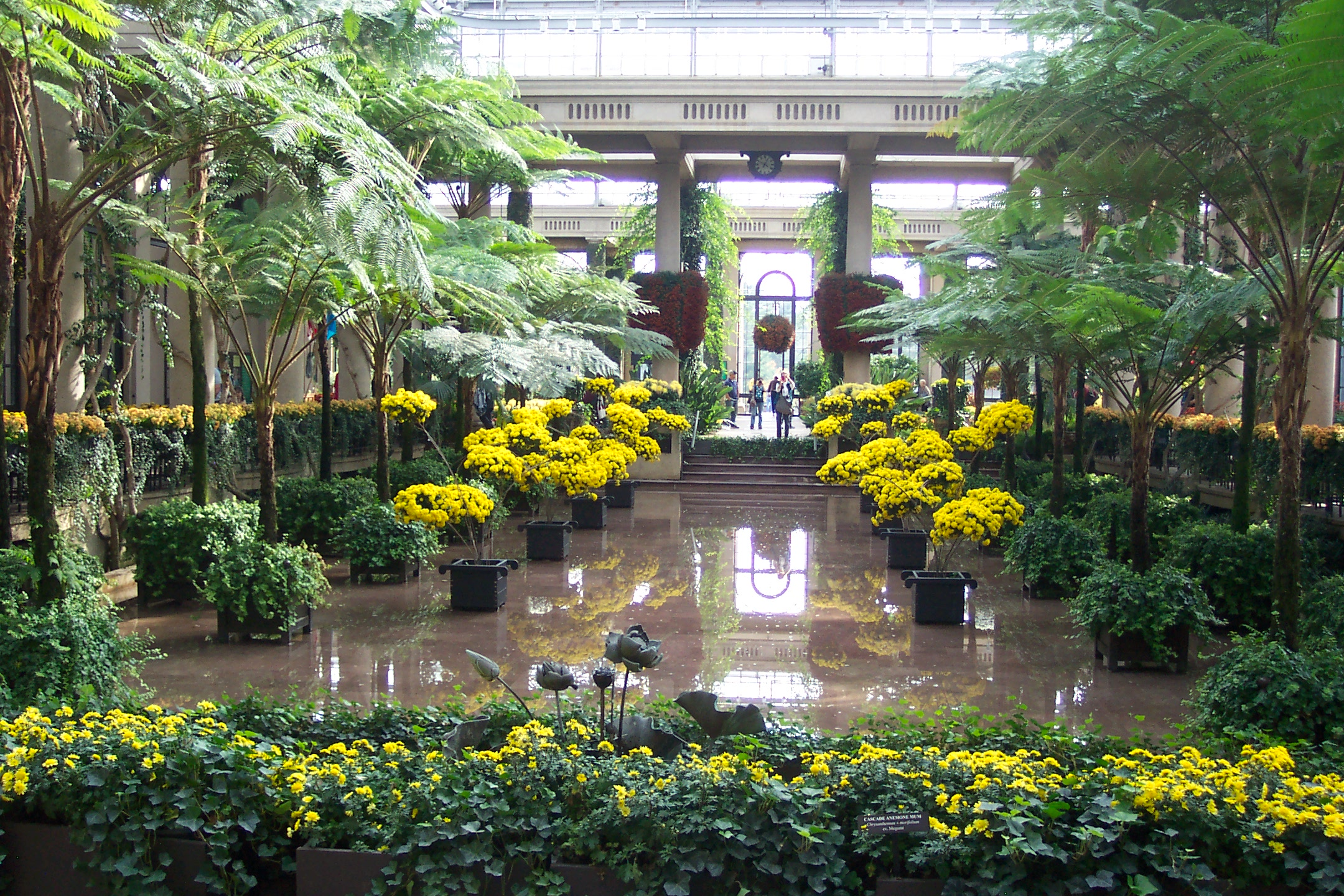
Indoor hall, November 2012

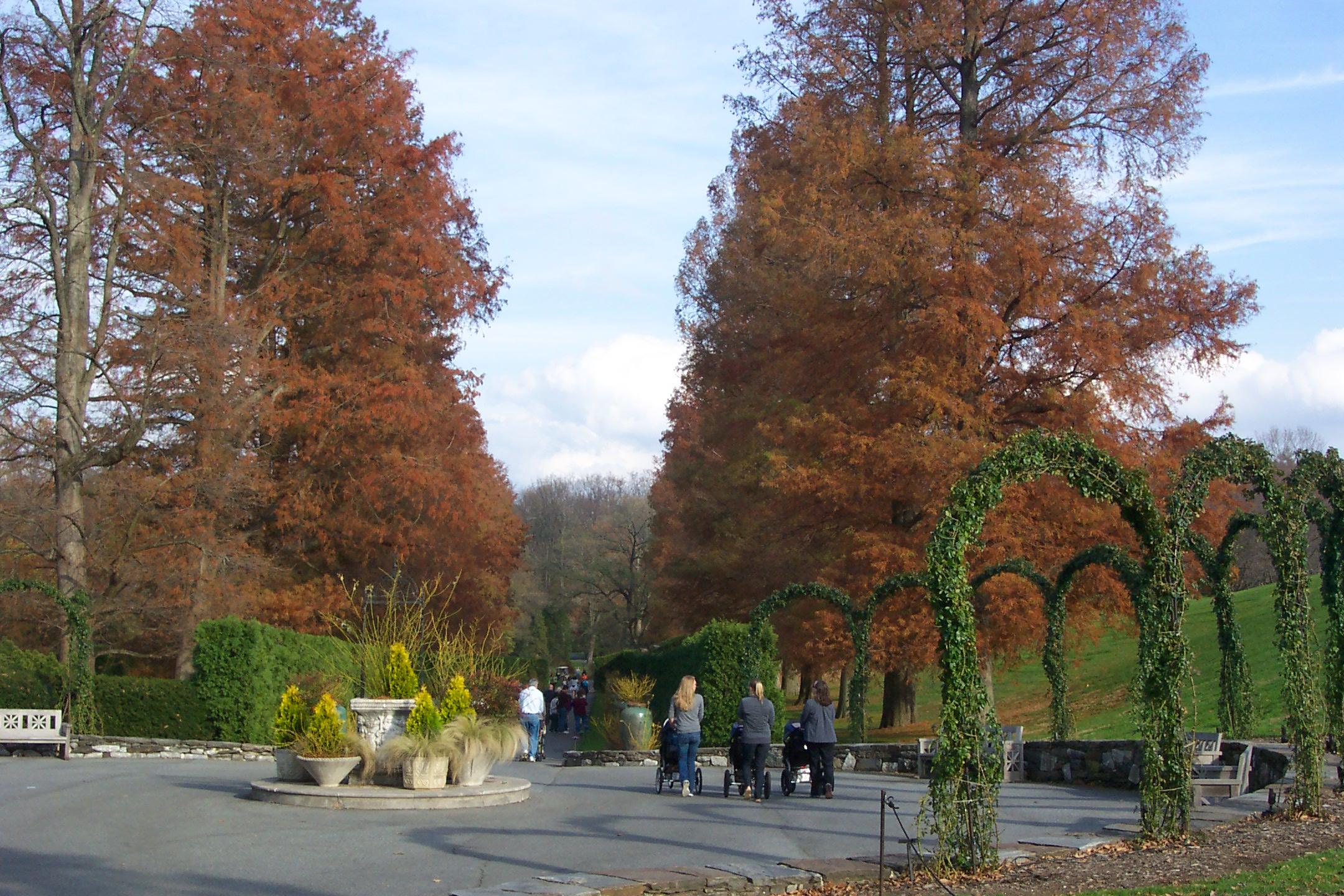
Exterior walkway, November 2012

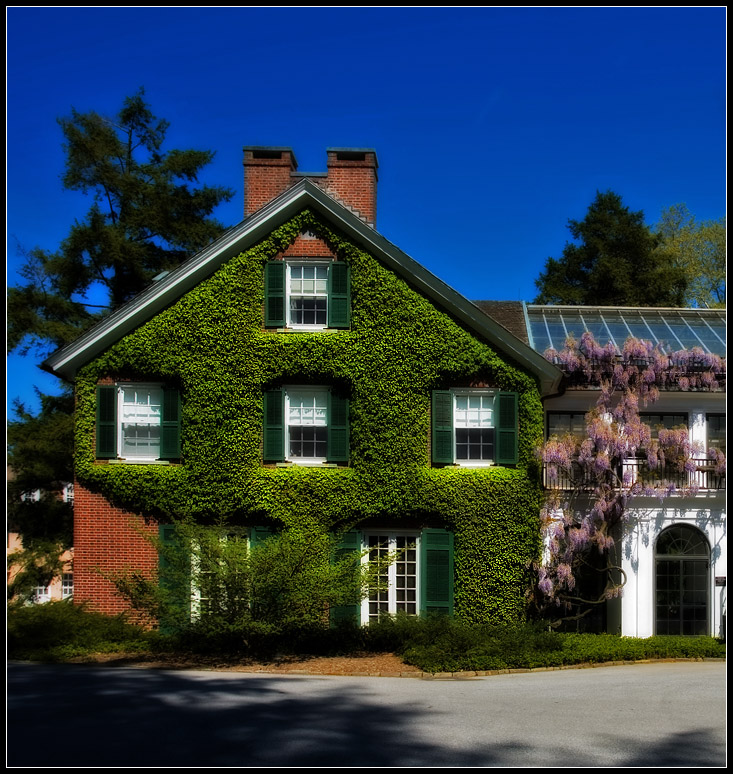
Peirce-Du Pont House, currently a museum

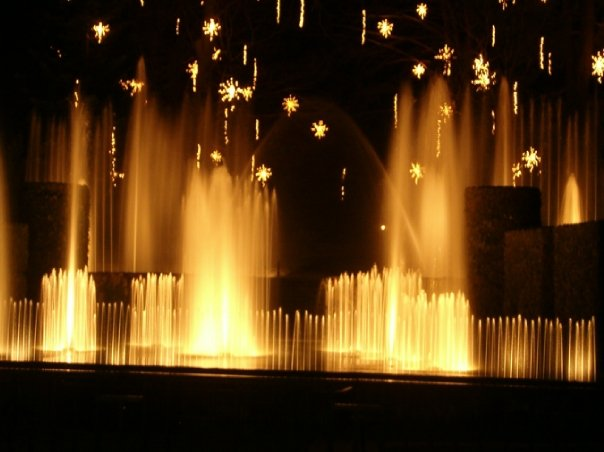
Fountain night display in the Open Air Theater, 2006

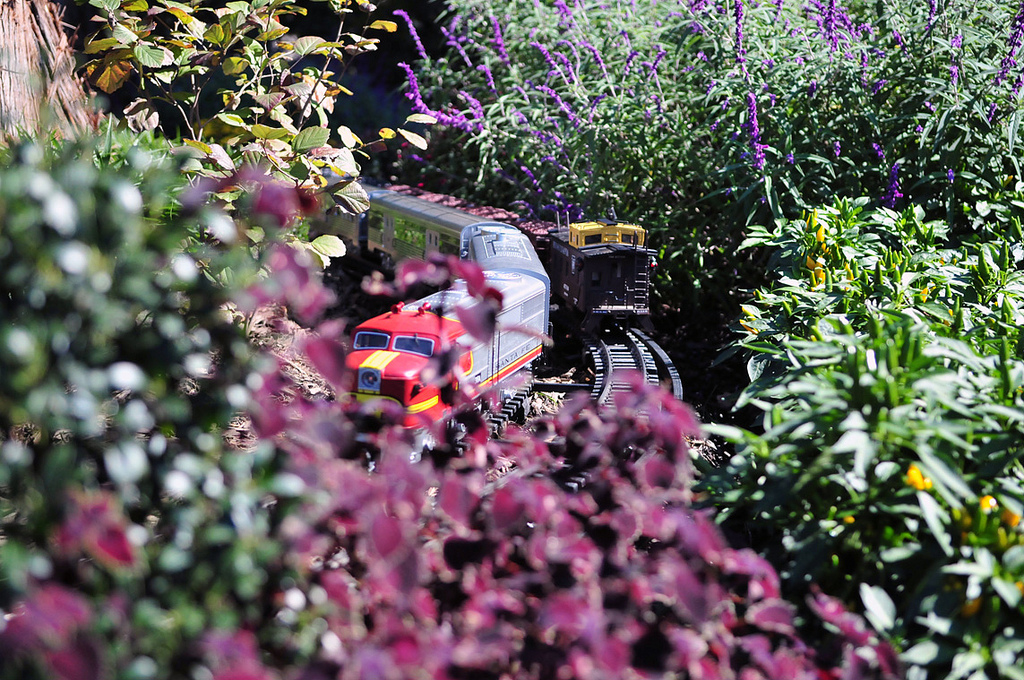
Longwood Gardens railway display, 2010

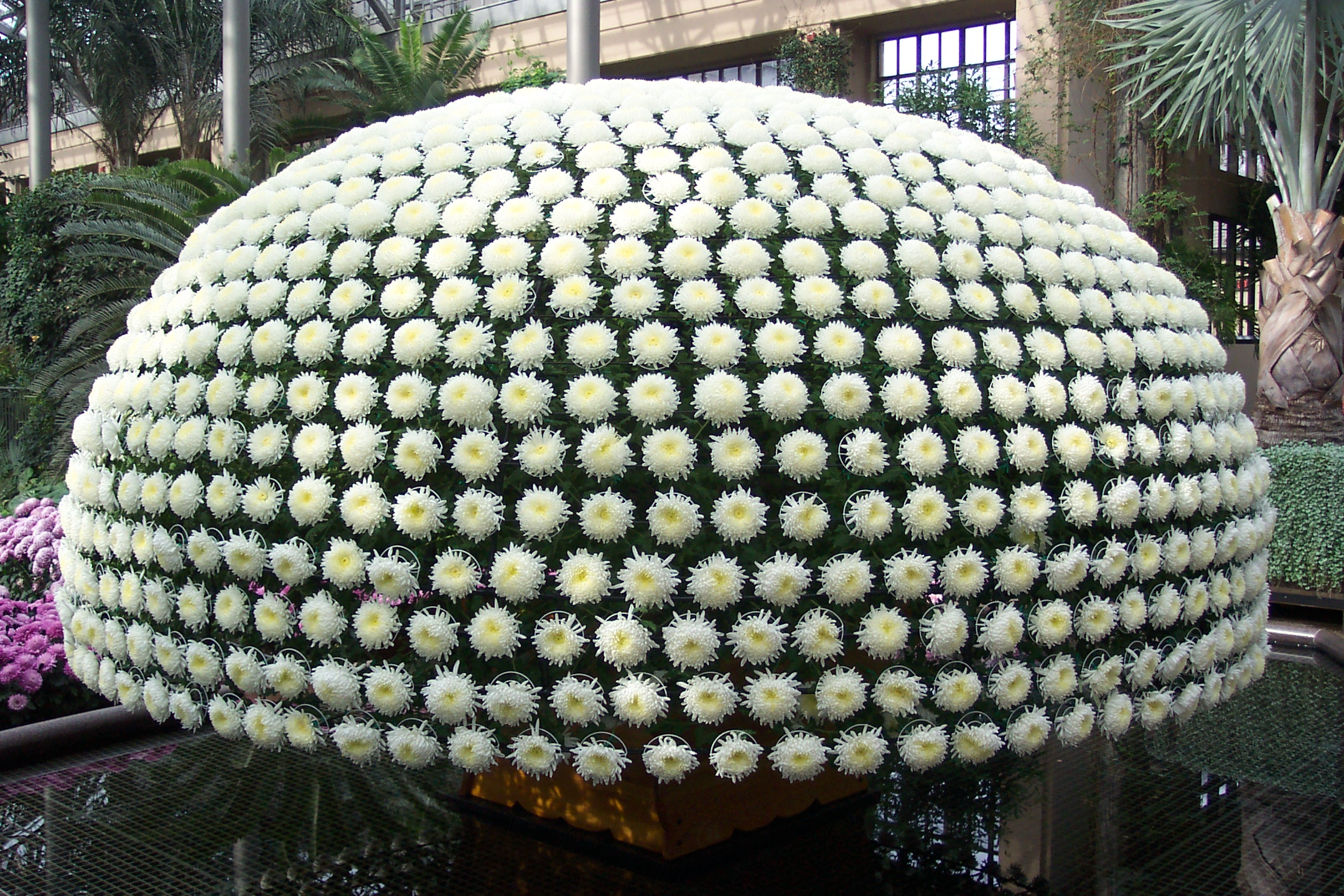
One-Thousand Bloom Chrysanthemum shown during the annual Chrysanthemum Festival, November 2012

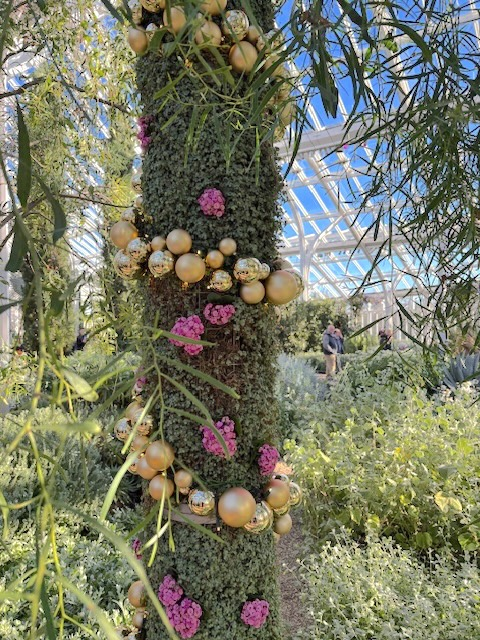
Longwood Gardens Christmas Decor 2025

== See also ==
- Hagley Museum and Library
- List of botanical gardens and arboretums in Pennsylvania
- List of museums in Pennsylvania
- Nemours Estate
- Winterthur Museum, Garden and Library
