= Streptomyces longwoodensis =

Scientific classification
- Domain: Bacteria
- Kingdom: Bacillati
- Phylum: Actinomycetota
- Class: Actinomycetes
- Order: Streptomycetales
- Family: Streptomycetaceae
- Genus: Streptomyces
- Species: S. longwoodensis

Binomial name
- Streptomyces longwoodensis Prosser and Palleroni 1981

Type strain
- ATCC 29251, BCRC 12034, CCRC 12034, CGMCC 4.1898, DSM 41677, IFO 14251, JCM 4976, KCC S-0976, KCCM 12296, KCTC 9783, LMG 20096, NBRC 14251, NRRL B-16923, Roche X-14537, X-14537

Species of bacterium

Streptomyces longwoodensis is a bacterium species from the genus of Streptomyces which has been isolated from soil the Longwood Gardens in Philadelphia in the United States.

== See also ==
- List of Streptomyces species
