= Hamorton, Pennsylvania =

Unincorporated community in Pennsylvania, US

- Census-designated place
- Location of Hamorton in Chester County and of Chester County in Pennsylvania

- Location within Pennsylvania Location within the United States
- Coordinates: 39°52′4″N 75°39′15″W
- Country: United States
- State: Pennsylvania
- County: Chester
- Township: Kennett

Area
  - Total: 0.12 sq mi (0.30 km^{2})
  - Land: 0.11 sq mi (0.29 km^{2})
  - Water: 0.0077 sq mi (0.02 km^{2})
- Elevation: 460 ft (140 m)

Population (2020)
  - Total: 179
  - Density: 1,605.8/sq mi (620.02/km^{2})
- Time zone: UTC-5 (Eastern (EST))
  - Summer (DST): UTC-4 (EDT)
- ZIP Codes: 19317 (Chadds Ford); 19348 (Kennett Square)
- Area code(s): 610 and 484
- FIPS code: 42-32280
- GNIS feature ID: 2812901

Hamorton is an unincorporated community and census-designated place (CDP) in Chester County, Pennsylvania, United States. It was first listed as a CDP prior to the 2020 census.

Hamorton is located primarily in southern Chester County, in the northeastern part of Kennett Township. U.S. Route 1 passes through the community, leading east (northbound) 3 miles (5 km) to Chadds Ford and west (southbound) the same distance to Kennett Square. Pennsylvania Route 52 intersects Route 1 in Hamorton, leading southeast 10 miles (16 km) to Wilmington, Delaware, and northeast 9 miles (14 km) to West Chester.

The Hamorton Historic District, listed on the National Register of Historic Places, comprises 75 historic buildings in the northern part of the CDP along US 1.

== Demographics ==
Historical population
Census	Pop.	Note	%±
2020	179		—
U.S. Decennial Census
