= Kennett Township, Pennsylvania =

Township in Pennsylvania, US

Kennett Township
- Township
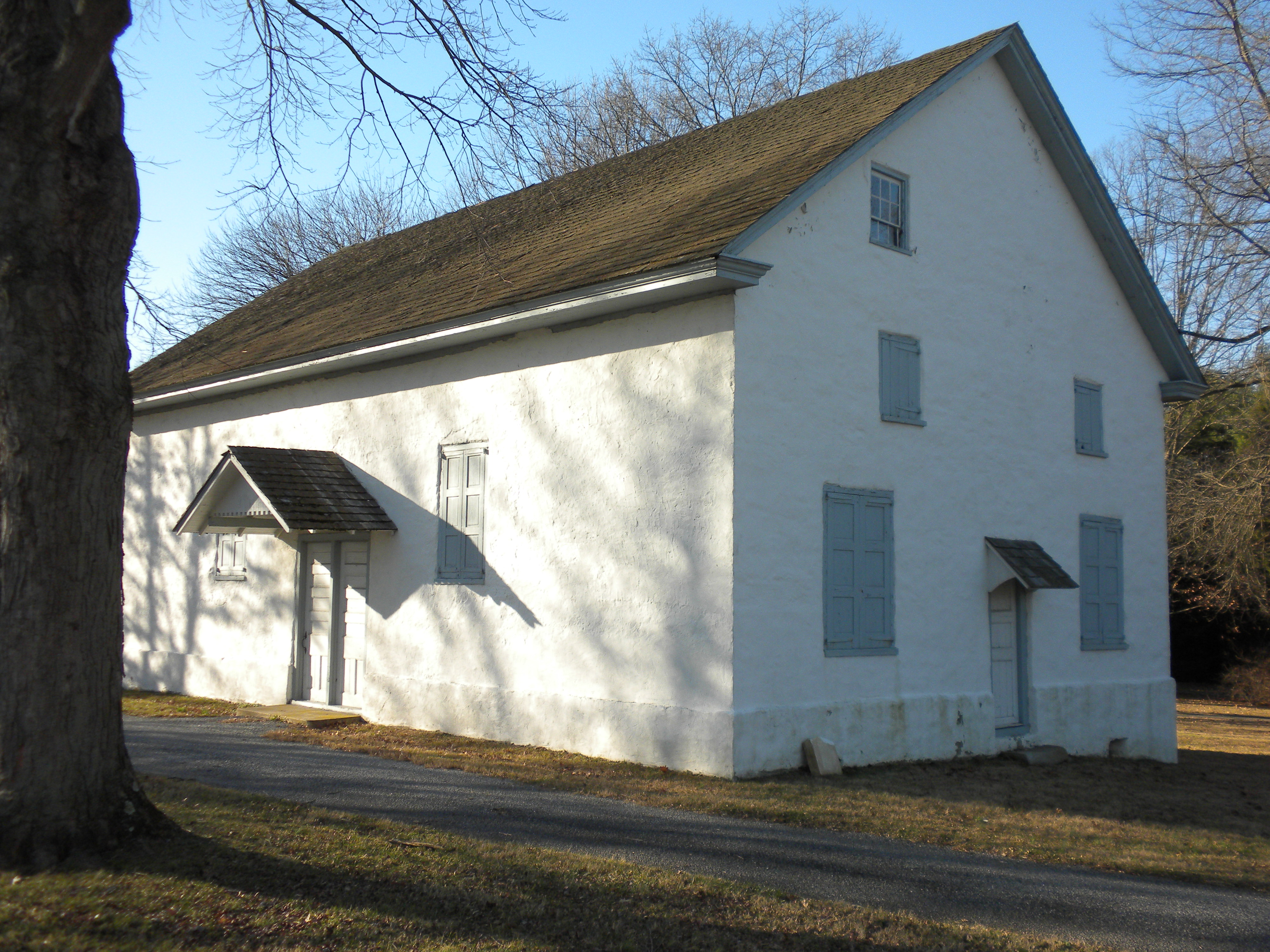
- Old Kennett Meetinghouse

- Location of Kennett Township in Chester County, Pennsylvania (left) and of Chester County in Pennsylvania (right)

- Location of Pennsylvania in the United States
- Coordinates: 39°50′57″N 75°40′02″W
- Country: United States
- State: Pennsylvania
- County: Chester

Area
  - Total: 15.48 sq mi (40.10 km^{2})
  - Land: 15.34 sq mi (39.73 km^{2})
  - Water: 0.14 sq mi (0.37 km^{2})
- Elevation: 404 ft (123 m)

Population (2020)
  - Total: 8,289
  - Density: 540.4/sq mi (208.6/km^{2})
- Time zone: UTC-5 (EST)
  - Summer (DST): UTC-4 (EDT)
- Area code: 610
- FIPS code: 42-029-39344
- Website: www.kennett.pa.us

Kennett Township is a second-class township in Chester County, Pennsylvania, United States. The population was 8,289 at the 2020 census.

== History ==
Chandler Mill Bridge, Joseph Gregg House, Hamorton Historic District, Harlan Log House, Old Kennett Meetinghouse, and the Wiley-Cloud House are listed on the National Register of Historic Places.

== Geography ==
According to the United States Census Bureau, the township has a total area of 15.6 square miles (40 km^{2}), of which 0.04 square miles (0.10 km^{2}), or 0.13%, is water. The northwestern part of the township encircles the separate borough of Kennett Square, while the census-designated place of Hamorton is in the northeastern part of the township.

== Demographics ==
Historical population
Census	Pop.	Note	%±
1930	1,343		—
1940	1,767		31.6%
1950	2,145		21.4%
1960	3,026		41.1%
1970	3,394		12.2%
1980	4,201		23.8%
1990	4,624		10.1%
2000	6,451		39.5%
2010	7,565		17.3%
2020	8,289		9.6%
2020

At the 2020 census, the township was 75.5% non-Hispanic White, 5.7% Black or African American, 0.0% Native American, 2.7% Asian, 0.0% Native Hawaiian or other Pacific Islander, and 2.2% were two or more races. 14.4% of the population were of Hispanic or Latino ancestry.

As of the 2020 census of 2020, there were 8,289 people, 3,308 households in the township. The population density was 493.2 people per square mile. The racial makeup of the township was 88.1% White, 5.7% African American, 0.0% Native American, 2.7% Asian, 0.0% Pacific Islander, and 2.2% from two or more races. Hispanic or Latino of any race were 14.4% of the population.

The township is home to a large and rapidly growing Hispanic (primarily Mexican) community.

In the township the population was spread out, with 5.7% under the age of 5, 21.3% under the age of 18, and 24.9% who were 65 years of age or older. 57.1% of the township population is female.

The median income for a household in the township was $118,520, with 6.4% of the township persons in poverty.

== Transportation ==
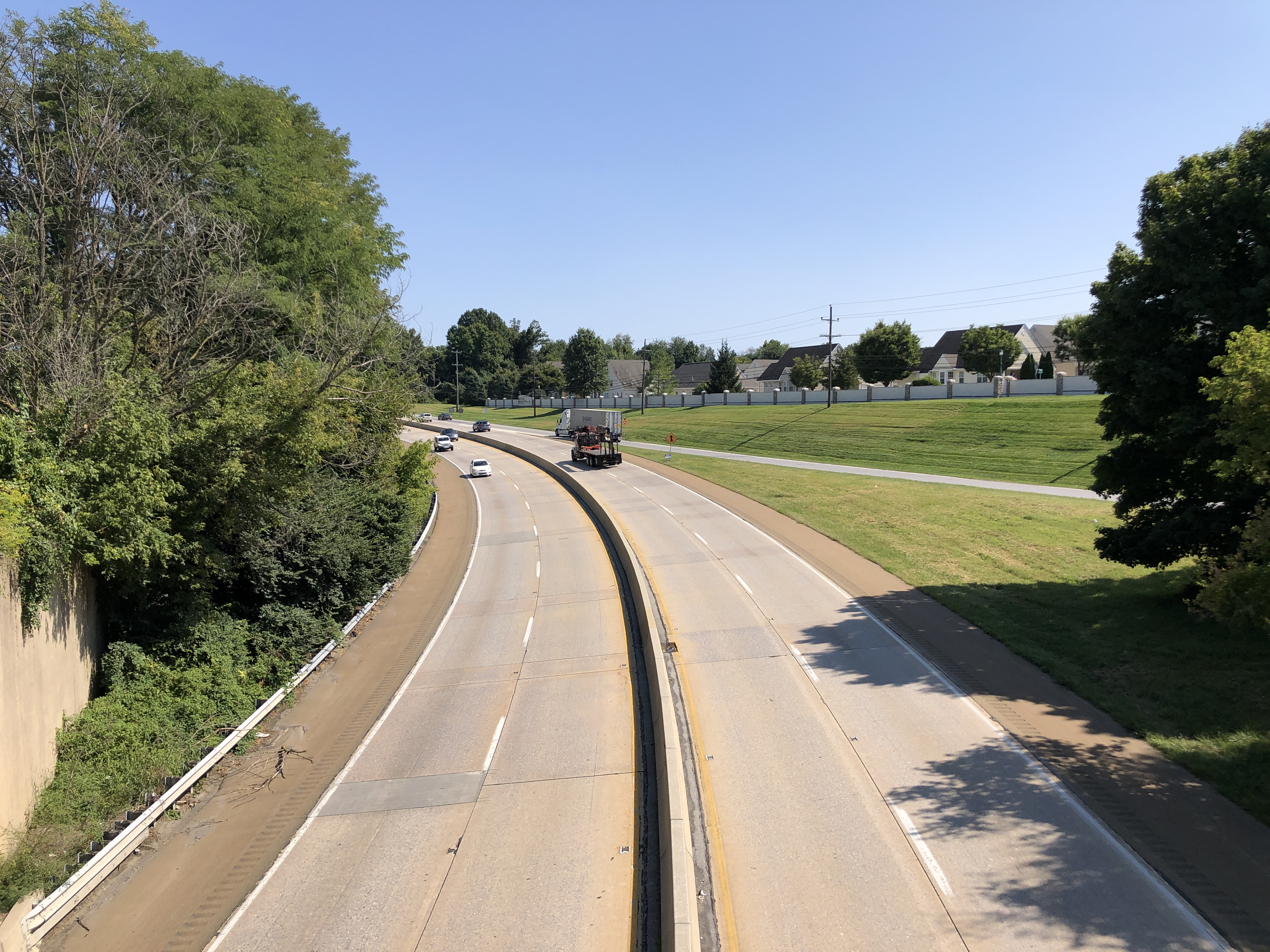
US 1 northbound in Kennett Township

As of 2020, there were 72.85 miles (117.24 km) of public roads in Kennett Township, of which 17.04 miles (27.42 km) were maintained by the Pennsylvania Department of Transportation (PennDOT) and 55.81 miles (89.82 km) were maintained by the township.

U.S. Route 1 is the most prominent highway serving Kennett Township. It follows the Kennett–Oxford Bypass and Baltimore Pike on a west-east alignment along the northern edge of the township. Pennsylvania Route 41 follows Gap Newport Pike along a northwest-southeast alignment across the southwestern corner of the township. Pennsylvania Route 52 follows Kennett Pike, Baltimore Pike and Lenape Road along a northwest-southeast alignment across the northeastern part of the township, including a short concurrency with US 1. Finally, Pennsylvania Route 82 follows Creek Road and Union Street along a northwest-southeast alignment through western portions of the township.
