= Joseph Gregg House =

Historic house in Pennsylvania, United States

- U.S. National Register of Historic Places
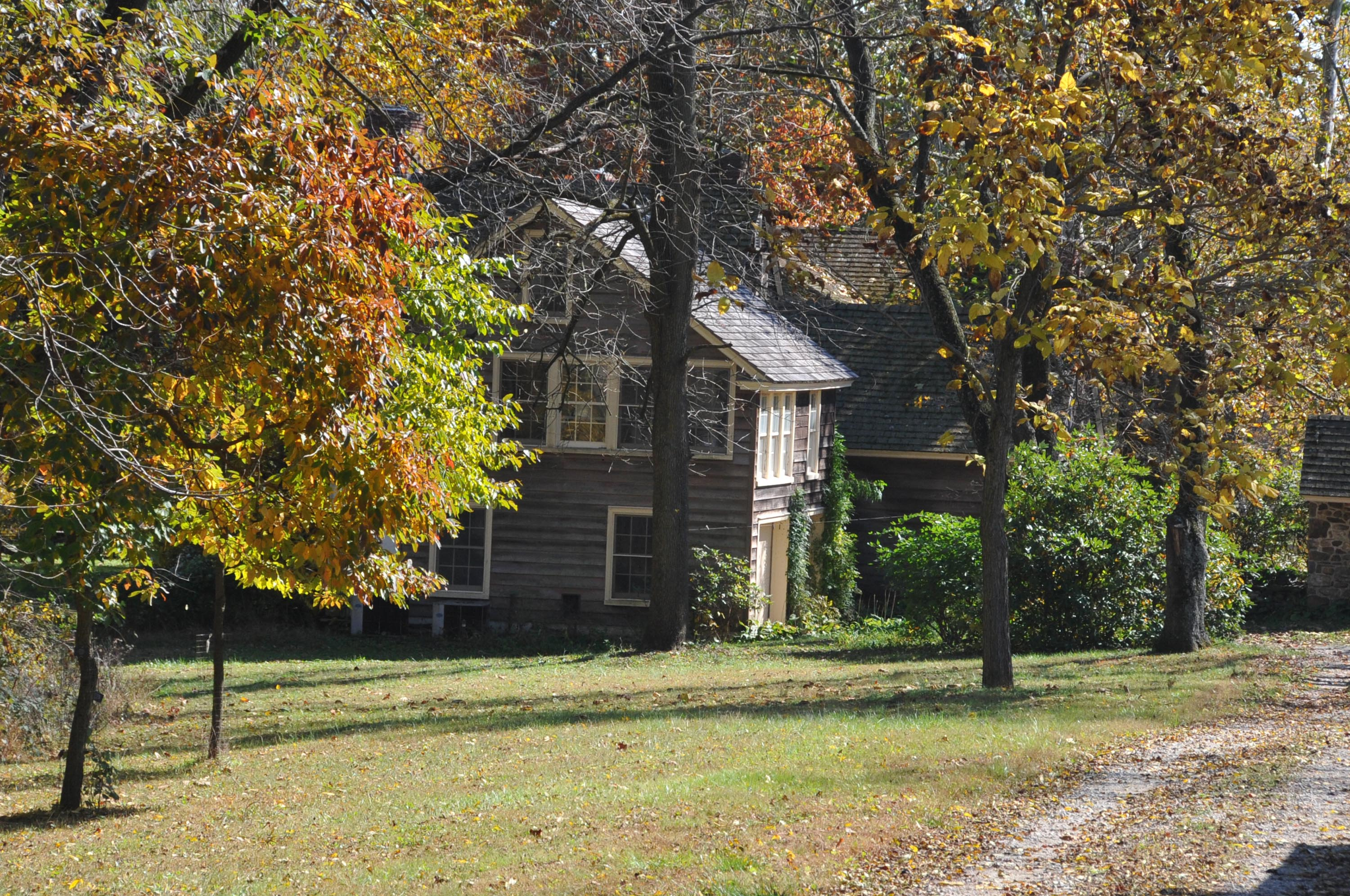

- Location within Pennsylvania Location within the United States
- Location: 500 Chandler Mill Road, Kennett Township, Pennsylvania
- Coordinates: 39°49′05″N 75°43′07″W
- Area: 13 acres (5.3 ha)
- Built: 1737
- Architectural style: Colonial
- NRHP reference No.: 94000007
- Added to NRHP: February 4, 1994

The Joseph Gregg House is an historic home that is located in Kennett Township, Chester County, Pennsylvania.

It was added to the National Register of Historic Places in 1994.

== History and architectural features ==
The original section was built circa 1737. Additions were then made in roughly 1820, 1860 and 1986. The original section is a 2 1/2-story, three-bay, brick, Colonial farmhouse with a gable roof, measures twenty feet by thirty feet, and sits on a stone foundation. The section which includes the 1820 and 1860 additions was created using rubble fieldstone.
