= Chandler Mill Bridge =

- U.S. National Register of Historic Places
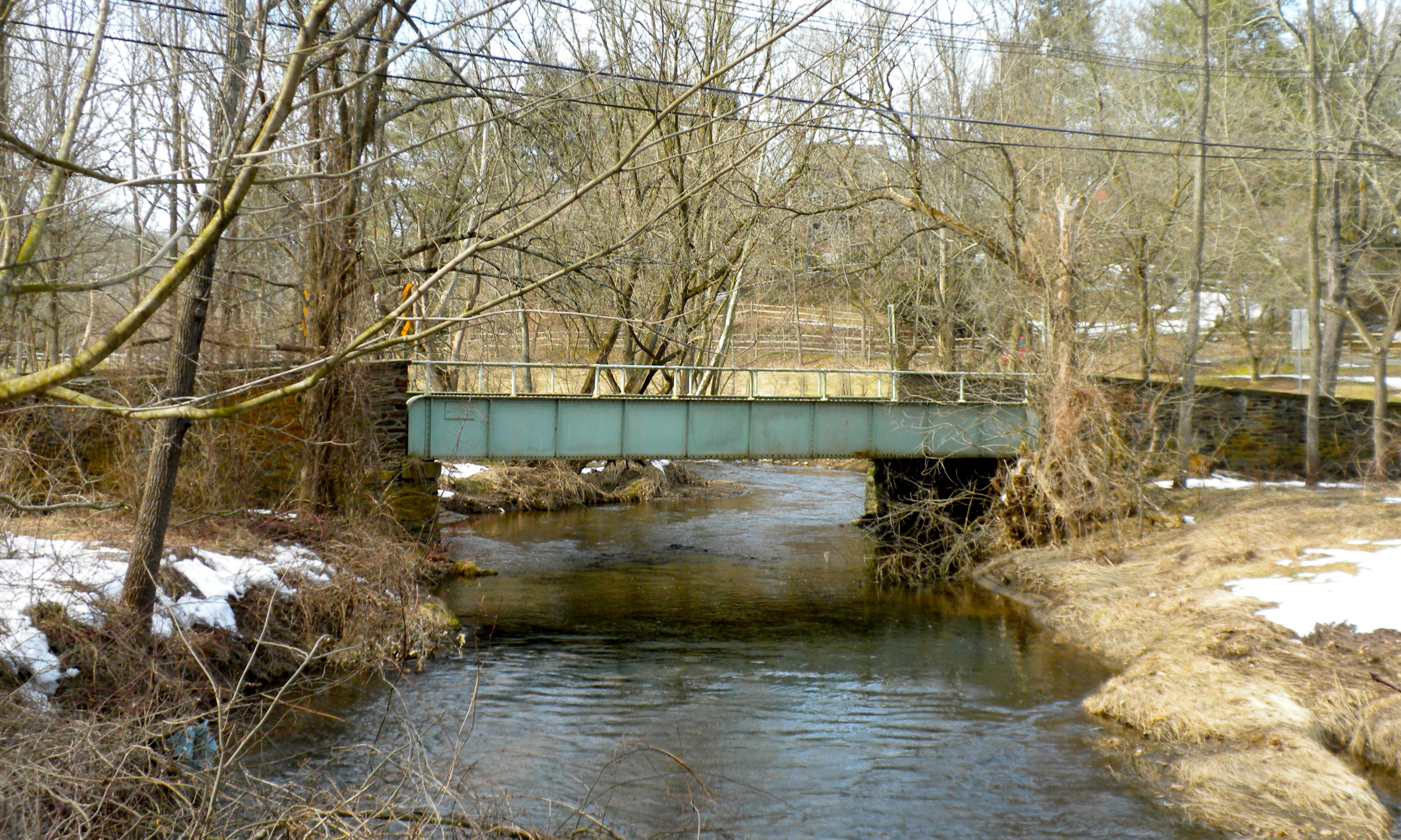
- Chandler Mill Bridge, March 2010

- Location within Pennsylvania Location within the United States
- Location: Chandler Mill Road over West Branch Red Clay Creek, Kennett Township, Pennsylvania
- Coordinates: 39°48′48″N 75°42′48″W
- Area: less than one acre
- Built: 1910
- Built by: George Dole
- Architect: Nathan R. Rambo
- Architectural style: built-up plate through girder
- NRHP reference No.: 09001213
- Added to NRHP: January 11, 2010

Chandler Mill Bridge, also known as Chester County Bridge No. 236, is a historic steel bridge located in Kennett Township, Chester County, Pennsylvania. It spans the West Branch of Red Clay Creek. It is a single span, 47-foot-long (14 m), built up steel plate girder bridge. The bridge was constructed in 1910, and features stone abutments and wingwalls.

It was listed on the National Register of Historic Places in 2010.

The bridge has been closed since May 6, 2011, due to its deteriorating condition.
