= Harlan Log House =

Historic house in Pennsylvania, United States

- U.S. National Register of Historic Places
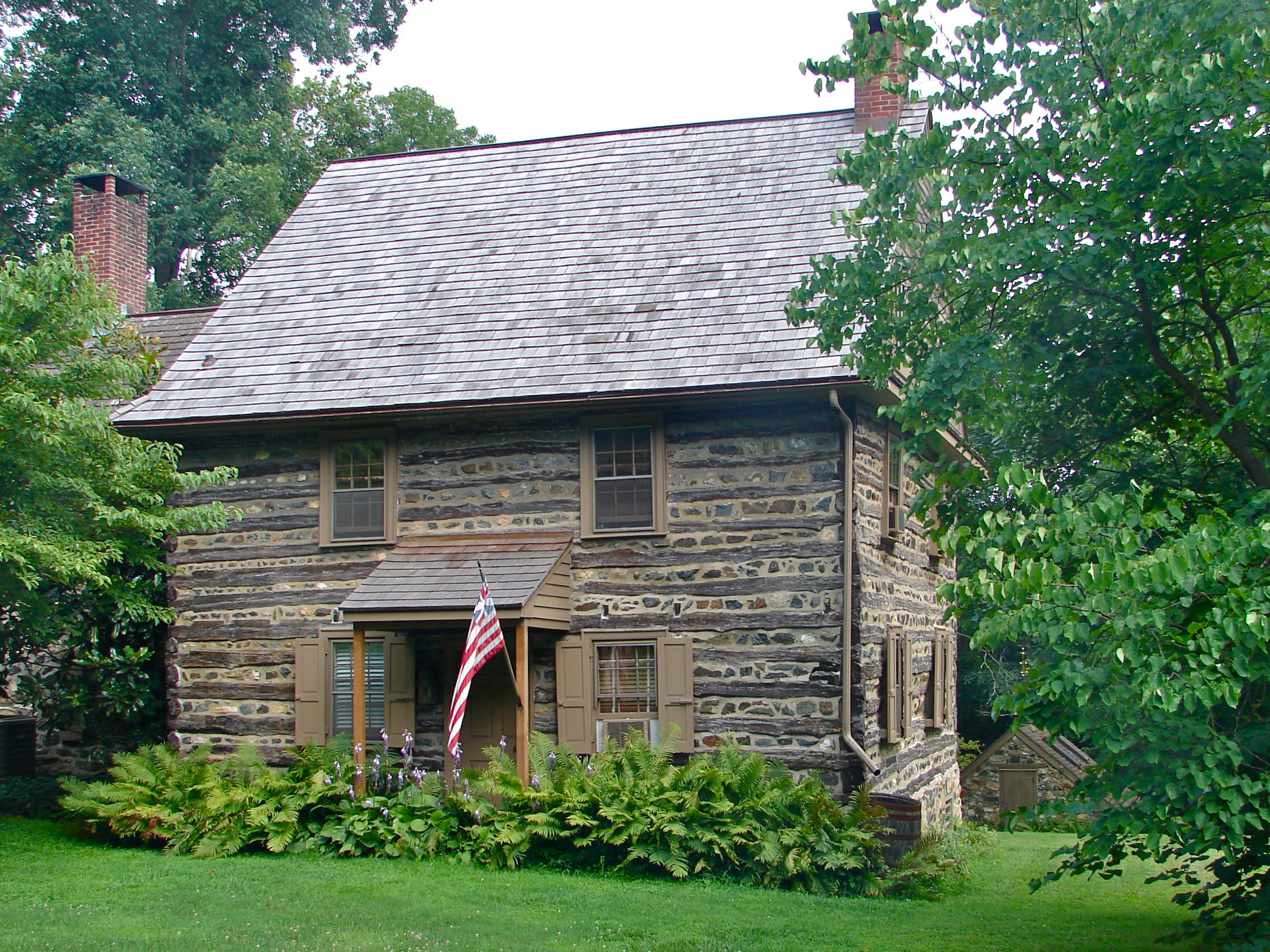
- Front of the house

- Location within Pennsylvania Location within the United States
- Location: Fairville Road, near Kennett Square, Kennett Township, Chester County, Pennsylvania
- Coordinates: 39°50′25″N 75°38′14″W
- Area: 5 acres (2.0 ha)
- Built: 1715
- Architect: Joshua Harlan
- Architectural style: Swedish log construction
- NRHP reference No.: 87001211
- Added to NRHP: July 16, 1987

The Harlan Log House, also known as "The Log House," was built about 1715 by Joshua Harlan, is a well-preserved example of an English-style log cabin near Kennett Square, in Kennett Township, Chester County, Pennsylvania, United States. It is about a half mile west of the hamlet of Fairville. Joshua Harlan was the son of George Harlan, who arrived in Pennsylvania in 1687. Joshua was born in 1696 and was the cousin of the George Harlan, who built the Harlan House, about 12 miles north about 1724. Both houses are listed in the National Register of Historic Places.

The core of the house was built about 1715 as a two-story square (26 feet by 26 feet) cabin. Although English settlers modelled their log cabins on the examples of Swedish settlers, the English versions were square rather than rectangular. An 1815 stone addition measures 19 feet by 15 feet, with a modern addition attached to the stone addition.

It was added to the National Register of Historic Places in 1987.
