= Fairville, Pennsylvania =

- Fairville Historic District
- U.S. National Register of Historic Places
- U.S. Historic district
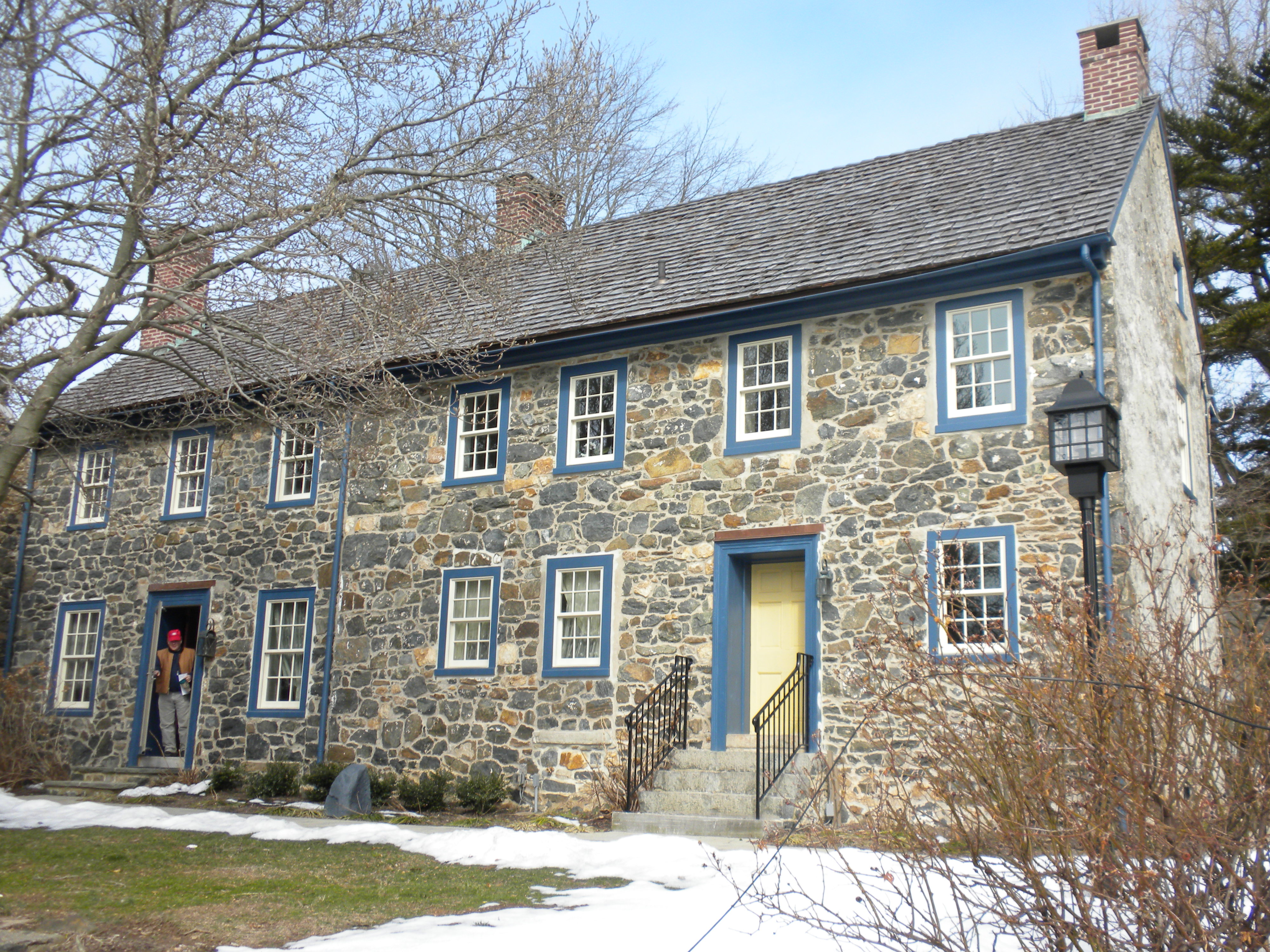

- Location within Pennsylvania Location within the United States
- Nearest city: Kennett Square, Pennsylvania
- Coordinates: 39°50′52″N 75°38′0″W
- Area: 26 acres (11 ha)
- Architect: Perot, Robeson Lea
- Architectural style: Colonial Revival
- NRHP reference No.: 96001200
- Added to NRHP: November 07, 1996

Fairville, Pennsylvania is an unincorporated area in southern Chester County which developed in the early nineteenth century about a mile north of the Pennsylvania-Delaware border. It is a linear village along the Kennett Pike (Pennsylvania Route 52) that runs between Kennett Square, Pennsylvania and Wilmington, Delaware. Businesses along the road served both travelers on the road and residents of nearby farms. The village or hamlet extends about 500 yards along both sides of Kennett Pike from Fairville Road to Hickory Hill Road.

About 1900 Phillip DuPont built a mansion just south of Fairville Road. It is included in the defined Fairville Historic District, which was listed on the National Register of Historic Places in 1996. The Harlan Log House, which was built about 1715, is about a half mile west of the village on Fairville Road.

== See also ==
- National Register of Historic Places listings in Chester County, Pennsylvania
- Centreville, Delaware
