= Hamorton Historic District =

Historic district in Pennsylvania, United States

- U.S. National Register of Historic Places
- U.S. Historic district
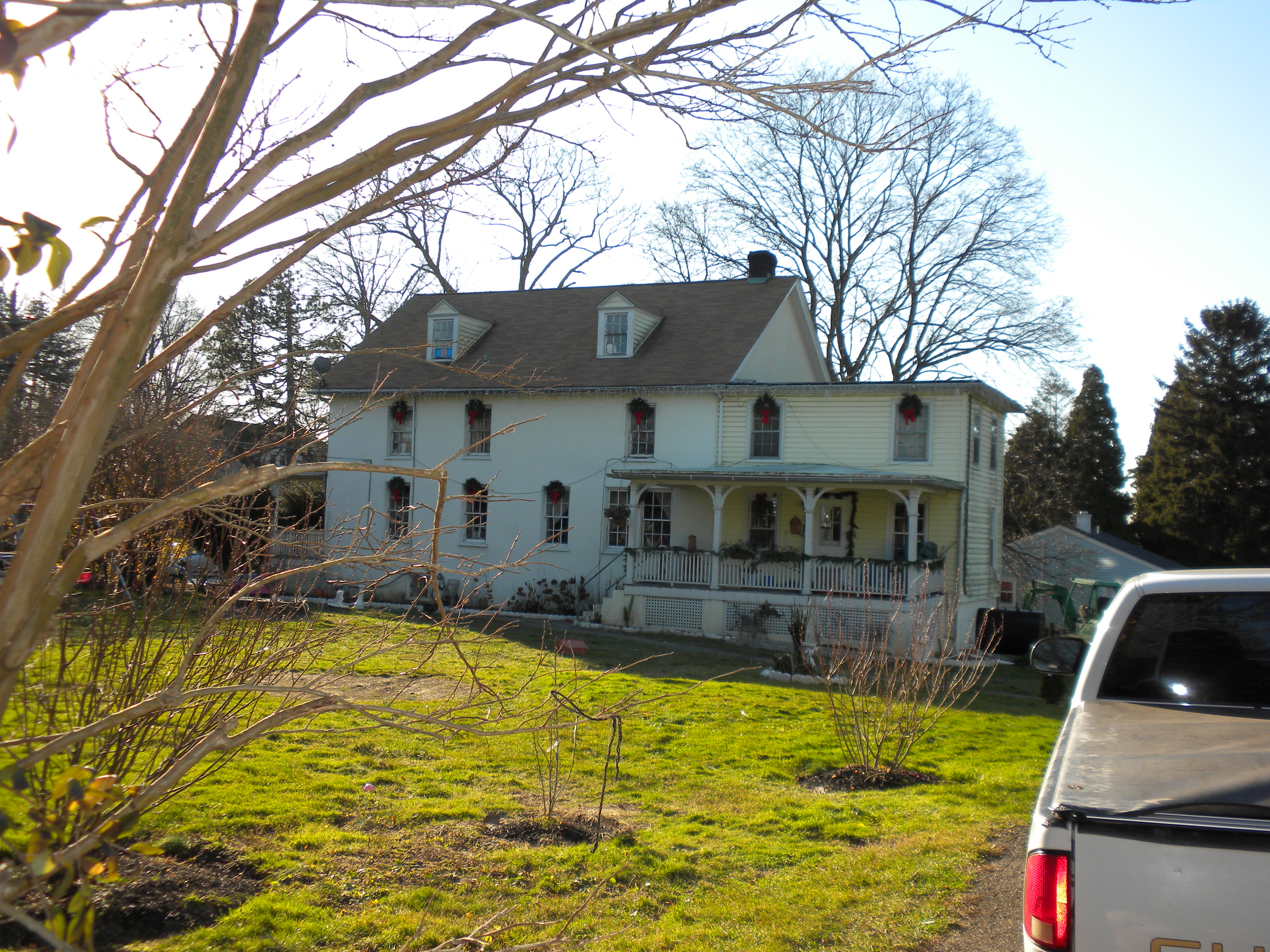
- House in Hamorton Historic District, December 2009

- Location within Pennsylvania Location within the United States
- Location: Junction of U.S. Route 1 and Pennsylvania Route 52, Kennett Township, Pennsylvania
- Coordinates: 39°52′08″N 75°39′18″W
- Area: 32.5 acres (13.2 ha)
- Built by: Hamor, Abraham; Martin, E.William
- Architectural style: Colonial Revival, Gothic Revival
- NRHP reference No.: 90000704 (original); 100012044 (increase)

Significant dates
- Added to NRHP: April 26, 1990
- Boundary increase: July 21, 2025

The Hamorton Historic District is a national historic district in the center of Hamorton, Kennett Township, Chester County, Pennsylvania, United States.

It was added to the National Register of Historic Places in 1990, with a boundary increase in 2025.

== History and architectural features ==
This historic district encompasses one contributing structure and seventy-five contributing buildings, which are located in the crossroads community of Hamorton. This district largely consists of a variety of stone, brick, and frame residences which were built between 1780 and 1930. The village was laid out during the 1830s, and was developed as a company town during the early twentieth century by Pierre S. du Pont (1870–1954).
