= Villa Ginanneschi-Gori, Siena =

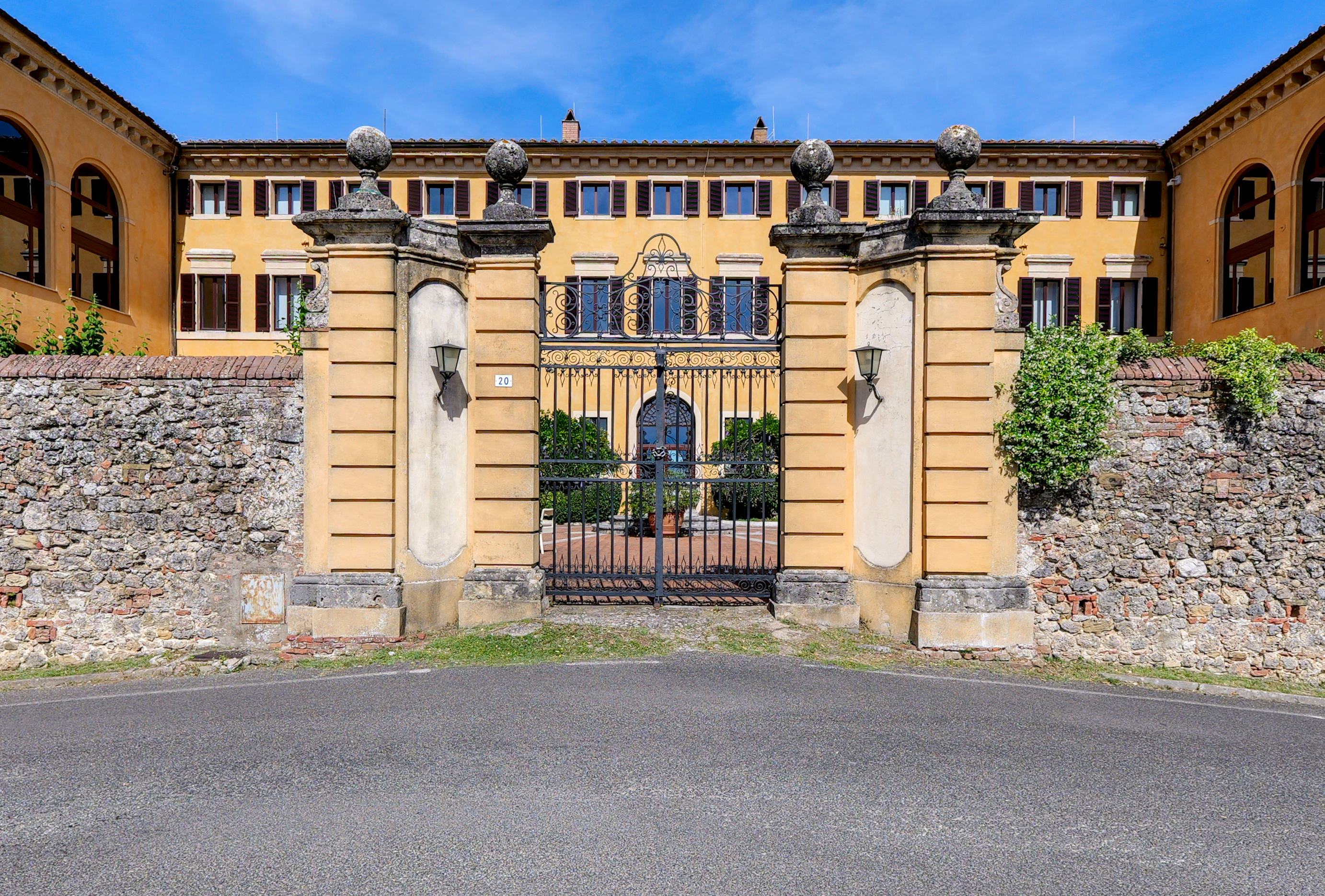
Villa Ginanneschi-Gori

The Villa Ginanneschi-Gori is a Baroque style suburban palace and gardens located in the Marciano neighborhood just outside the city of Siena, region of Tuscany, Italy.

The villa is best known for its arboreal landscaping and pruning, creating tunnel-like avenues from intertwined evergreen holm-oaks. Other areas of the grounds, previously used for hunting (ragnaia); and it includes an outdoor theater, teatro di verzura, that incorporates trees and greenery into the backdrop.
