= Strickersville, Pennsylvania =

Unincorporated community in Pennsylvania, US

- Unincorporated community
- Location within the U.S. state of Pennsylvania Strickersville (the United States)
- Coordinates: 39°44′2″N 75°47′35″W
- Country: United States
- State: Pennsylvania
- County: Chester
- Township: London Britain
- Elevation: 354 ft (108 m)
- Time zone: UTC-5 (Eastern (EST))
  - Summer (DST): UTC-4 (EDT)
- ZIP code: 19350
- Area codes: 610 and 484
- GNIS feature ID: 1204758

Strickersville is an unincorporated community in extreme southeastern Chester County, Pennsylvania, United States. It is located at the intersection of Pennsylvania Route 896 and Strickersville Road in London Britain Township. While it once supported a number of small businesses in the late 19th century, today its location is marked only by the aforementioned crossroads and several historic homes. Lunn's Tavern, a large stone and brick building just north of the Strickersville Road intersection, is a listing in the National Register of Historic Places.
