= Glen Hope Covered Bridge =

- U.S. National Register of Historic Places
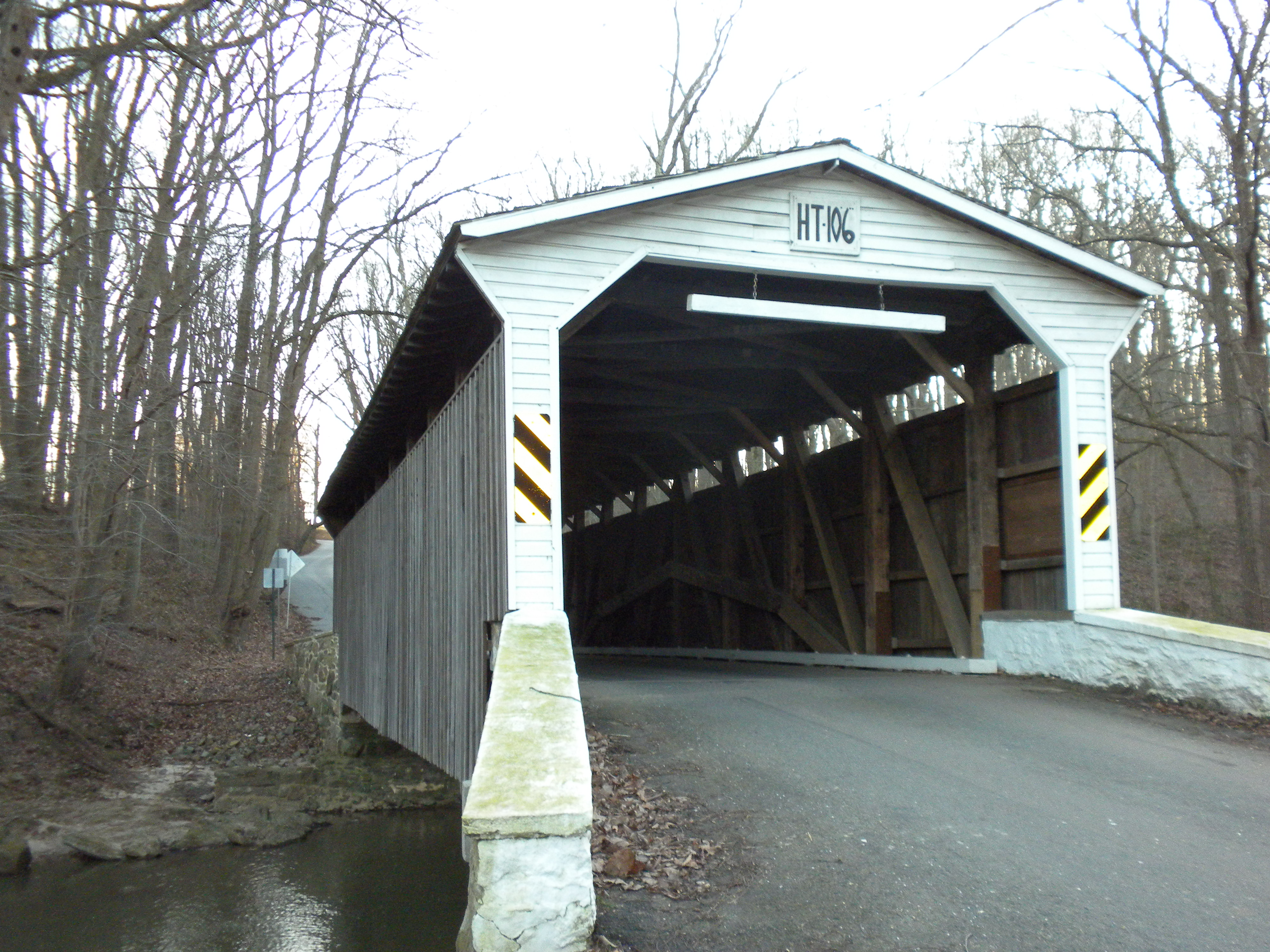
- Glen Hope Covered Bridge, December 2009

- Location within Pennsylvania Location within the United States
- Location: West of Lewisville on Township 344, near West Grove, Elk Township, Pennsylvania
- Coordinates: 39°43′37″N 75°54′28″W
- Area: less than one acre
- Built: 1889
- Built by: Menander Wood, George E. Jones
- Architectural style: Burr truss
- MPS: Covered Bridges of Chester County TR
- NRHP reference No.: 80003472
- Added to NRHP: December 10, 1980

Glen Hope Covered Bridge is a historic wooden covered bridge located in Elk Township, Chester County, Pennsylvania. It is a 65-foot-long (20 m) Burr truss bridge, constructed in 1889. It has vertical planking and eave-level window openings. It crosses Little Elk Creek.

It was listed on the National Register of Historic Places in 1980.
