= Pennsylvania Route 896 =

State highway in Pennsylvania, US

Pennsylvania Route 896

Route information
- Maintained by PennDOT
- Length: 33.722 mi (54.270 km)

Major junctions
- South end: MD 896 at the Maryland state line in Strickersville
- PA 841 in Kemblesville; PA 796 in New London Township; US 1 in Upper Oxford Township; PA 10 in Russellville; PA 372 in Georgetown; PA 741 near Strasburg; US 30 in East Lampeter Township
- North end: PA 340 in Smoketown

Location
- Country: United States
- State: Pennsylvania
- Counties: Chester, Lancaster

Highway system
- Pennsylvania State Route System; Interstate; US; State; Scenic; Legislative
← PA 895	→ PA 897

Pennsylvania Route 896 (PA 896) is a north–south state highway located in the counties of Chester and Lancaster in southeastern Pennsylvania. The southern terminus is at the Maryland state line just south of Strickersville in London Britain Township. South of the state line, the road continues as unsigned Maryland Route 896 (MD 896) for 0.21 mi (0.34 km), and then enters Delaware as Delaware Route 896 (DE 896) toward Newark. The northern terminus is at PA 340 in the East Lampeter Township community of Smoketown, just east of the city of Lancaster. The highway serves the borough of Strasburg, known for its Amish tourist attractions. The section south of the borough down to the state line is predominantly farmland. PA 896 follows a northwest-southeast orientation between PA 340 and the Maryland state line.

PA 896 was initially designated in 1928 between PA 42 (now PA 10) in Russellville and the Octoraro Creek in Homeville. In 1937, the route was extended in both directions to run between the Maryland border and U.S. Route 30 (US 30, now PA 462) east of Lancaster, following its current alignment between the Maryland border and Strasburg and Strasburg Pike northwest of Strasburg. The extension replaced a portion of PA 796 leading to the Maryland border. In the 1960s, PA 896 was rerouted at Strasburg to head north to PA 340. In 2009, PA 896 was routed to bypass Strasburg.

== Route description ==
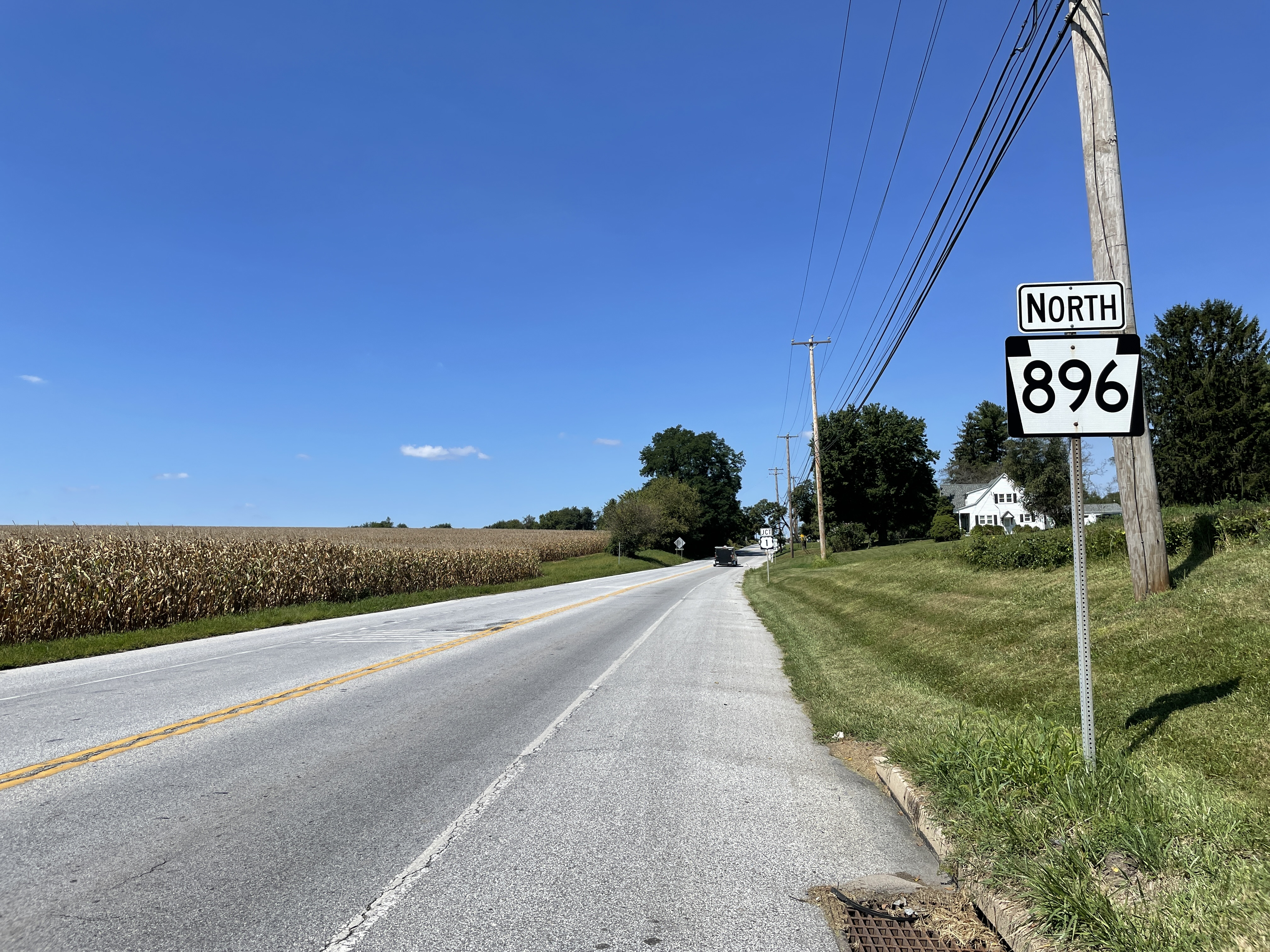
PA 896 northbound past Baltimore Pike in Upper Oxford Township

PA 896 begins at the Maryland border in London Britain Township in Chester County, at which the point the road continues south into Maryland as MD 896 for a short distance before crossing into Delaware and becoming DE 896. From the state line, PA 896 heads north on two-lane undivided New London Road, passing woods and homes as it comes to the community of Strickersville. At this point, the road turns to the northwest into a mix of farmland, woodland, and residences as it crosses into Franklin Township and reaches the community of Kemblesville. Here, the road passes several homes prior to crossing PA 841. Following this intersection, PA 896 becomes Newark Road and continues through a mix of rural areas and residential subdivisions as it enters New London Township. The route crosses State Road in the community of New London.

After turning more to the north, PA 896 intersects the southern terminus of PA 796 and heads north-northwest, crossing into Penn Township. The road crosses an East Penn Railroad line at-grade and makes a turn to the northwest, heading into farmland with some homes as it crosses the East Branch Big Elk Creek into Upper Oxford Township. The route crosses Baltimore Pike before reaching a partial cloverleaf interchange with the US 1 freeway. Following this interchange, PA 896 runs through open farmland with occasional residences, intersecting PA 10 in Russellville. The road continues through rural areas past this intersection, crossing Muddy Run on a one-lane bridge and passing through Homeville, where it turns southwest and northwest.

Upon crossing the East Branch Octoraro Creek in a wooded area, PA 896 heads into Colerain Township in Lancaster County and becomes Georgetown Road. At this point, the route enters the Pennsylvania Dutch Country of eastern Lancaster County, which is home to many Amish farms. The road continues through more agricultural areas, turning more to the north. The route enters Bart Township and heads northwest again as it continues to the small residential community of Nine Points. Farther northwest, PA 896 crosses a bridge over the Enola Low Grade Trail before intersecting PA 372 in the community of Green Tree. At this point, PA 372 turns north onto PA 896 and the two routes run concurrent through a mix of farms and homes. PA 372 splits from PA 896 by heading east on Christiana Pike, at which point PA 896 makes a turn to the west and enters the community of Georgetown. In Georgetown, the route makes a turn to the north and curves to the northwest again as it leaves Georgetown.

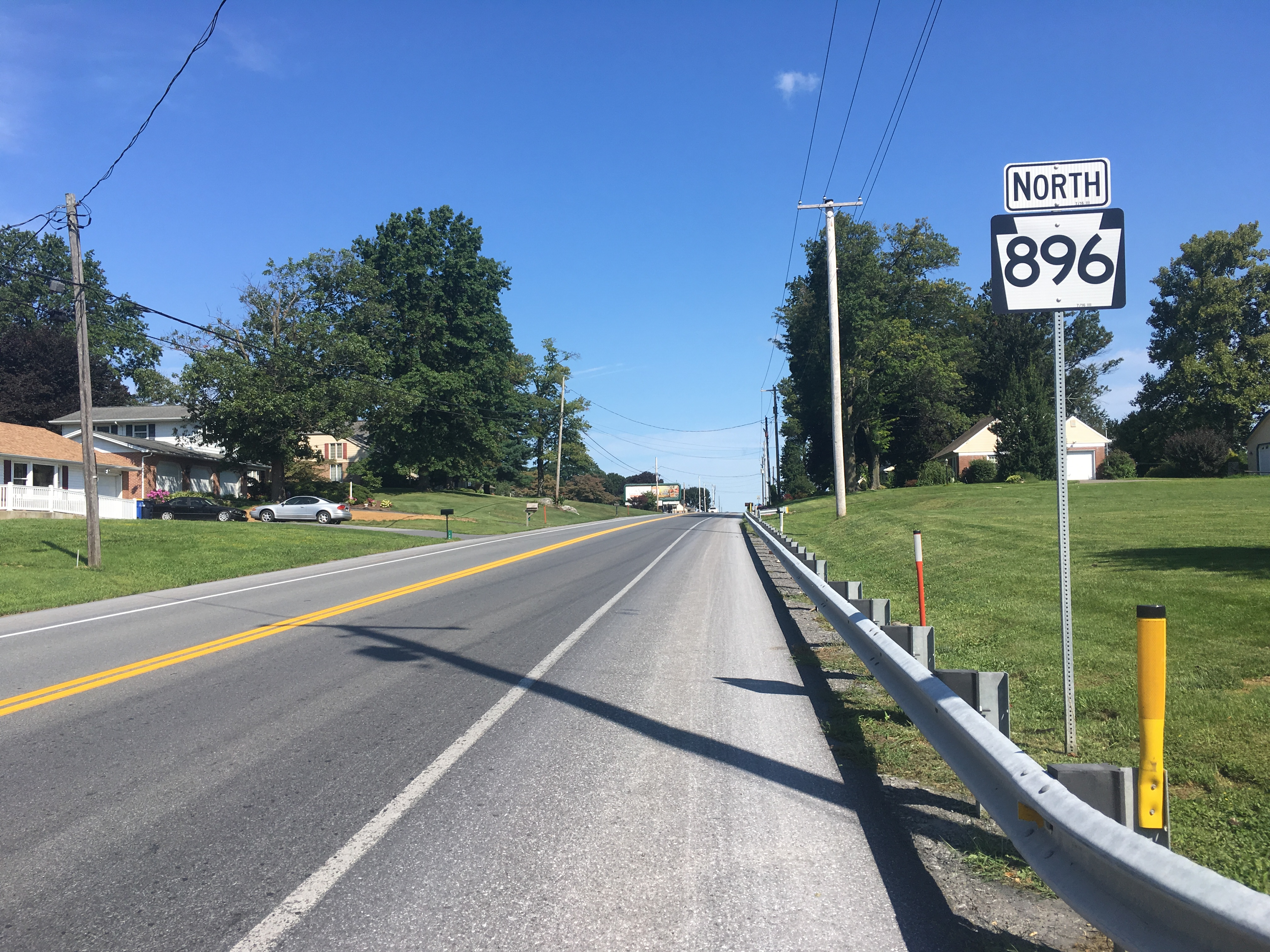
PA 896 northbound in East Lampeter Township

The road continues through more farmland as it crosses into Paradise Township. Upon crossing into Paradise Township, PA 896 turns to the west-northwest and passes a mix of woods and homes before heading back into agricultural areas and turning west. The route curves to the northwest as it enters Strasburg Township and turns north onto Historic Drive, passing west of a shopping center that is home to the Choo Choo Barn, a model railroad display, and reaching an intersection with PA 741 a short distance to the west of the Strasburg Rail Road and the Railroad Museum of Pennsylvania. At this point, PA 896 crosses PA 741 and continues northwest through farmland with some businesses, straddling the border between the borough of Strasburg to the southwest and Strasburg Township to the northeast. North of Strasburg, PA 896 turns north onto Hartman Bridge Road and passes homes and businesses as it crosses back into Strasburg Township, at which point it runs through a mix of farms, homes, and businesses, passing east of Sight & Sound Theatres. After crossing the Pequea Creek, PA 896 enters East Lampeter Township and continues north to an intersection with US 30 (Lincoln Highway) in a commercial area near two shopping centers. After this intersection, the route becomes Eastbrook Road and passes a mix of farm fields and residential subdivisions with some businesses before crossing Mill Creek and ending at PA 340 in the community of Smoketown.

== History ==
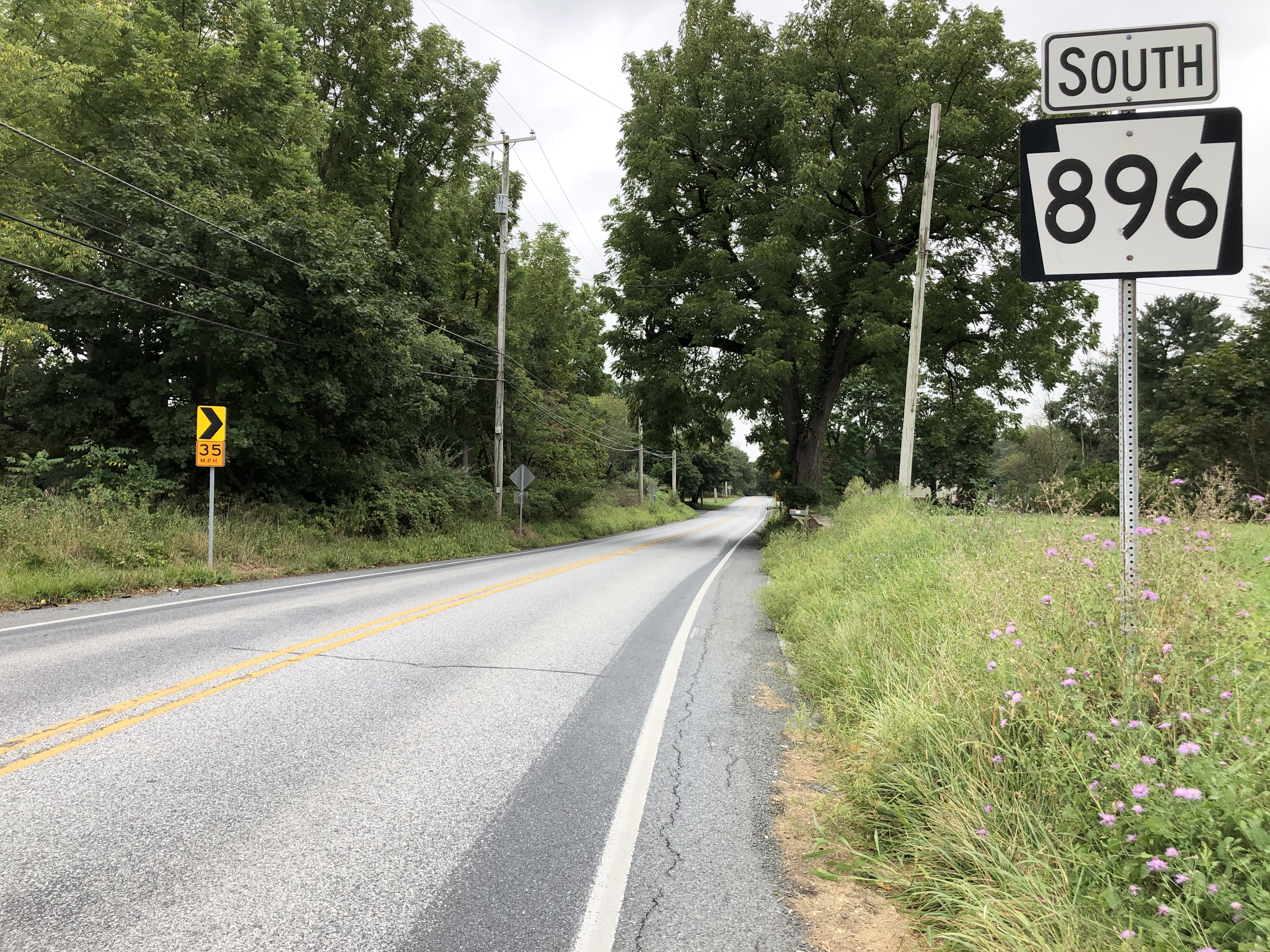
PA 896 southbound in London Britain Township

When Pennsylvania first legislated routes in 1911, what is now PA 896 was not legislated as part of a route. PA 896 was first designated in 1928 to run from PA 42 (now PA 10) in Russellville northwest to the Octoraro Creek in Homeville along an unpaved road. At this time, the road between the Maryland border and Rusellville was an unnumbered paved road while the portion in Lancaster County was an unnumbered unpaved road. By 1930, PA 896 was paved while PA 796 was designated on the present-day route from the Maryland border to a point north of New London. In 1937, PA 896 was extended in both directions. The southern terminus was extended from Russellville to the Maryland border on its current alignment, replacing a portion of PA 796, while the northern terminus was extended from the Octoraro Creek to US 30 (now PA 462) east of Lancaster, heading northwest toward Strasburg on its current alignment before it turned west along PA 741 through Strasburg and northwest along Strasburg Pike to US 30. PA 896 was rerouted at Strasburg to head north to PA 340 in the 1960s. In 1997, plans were made to build a bypass of Strasburg to the northeast in order to reduce traffic in the borough. Construction on the bypass began in 2008. In November 2009, the bypass was completed, and PA 896 was routed to bypass Strasburg along Historic Drive instead of following PA 741 (Main Street) and Decatur Street through the borough. The bypass cost $8.3 million to build.

== Major intersections ==
County	Location	mi	km	Destinations	Notes
Chester	London Britain Township	0.000	0.000	MD 896 south (Mechanicsville Road)	Continuation into Maryland
Chester	Franklin Township	3.876	6.238	PA 841 (Chesterville Road)	
Chester	New London Township	7.842	12.620	PA 796 north (Jennersville Road)	Southern terminus of PA 796
Chester	Upper Oxford Township	10.246	16.489	US 1 (Kennett–Oxford Bypass) – Kennett Square, Oxford	Interchange
Chester	Upper Oxford Township	12.297	19.790	PA 10 (Limestone Road)	
Lancaster	Bart Township	21.684	34.897	PA 372 west (Valley Road) – Quarryville	Southern end of PA 372 concurrency
Lancaster	Bart Township	22.670	36.484	PA 372 east (Christiana Pike) – Christiana	Northern end of PA 372 concurrency
Lancaster	Strasburg Township	29.169	46.943	PA 741 (Gap Road) – Strasburg, Willow Street, Gap	
Lancaster	East Lampeter Township	32.503	52.309	US 30 (Lincoln Highway) – Lancaster, Gap	
Lancaster	East Lampeter Township	33.722	54.270	PA 340 (Old Philadelphia Pike)	Northern terminus
1.000 mi = 1.609 km; 1.000 km = 0.621 mi: Concurrency terminus

== PA 896 Alternate Truck ==
PA Route 896 Alternate Truck
- Location: Chester County, Pennsylvania
- Length: 7.7 mi (12.4 km)
- Existed: 2025–present

Pennsylvania Route 896 Alternate Truck is a truck route that bypasses a weight-restricted segment of PA 896 on which trucks with trailers over 45 feet in length are prohibited. The segment also features a bridge over Muddy Run that prohibits trucks over 30 tons and combination loads over 40 tons. The route follows PA 10, Street Road, Union School Road, and Homeville Road through parts of western Chester County, Pennsylvania. Signs were posted in 2025.
