= Russellville, Pennsylvania =

Unincorporated community in Pennsylvania, US

- Unincorporated community
- Location within Pennsylvania Location within the United States
- Coordinates: 39°50′32″N 75°56′29″W
- Country: United States
- State: Pennsylvania
- County: Chester
- Township: Upper Oxford
- Elevation: 630 ft (190 m)
- Time zone: UTC-5 (Eastern (EST))
  - Summer (DST): UTC-4 (EDT)
- Area codes: 610 and 484
- GNIS feature ID: 1185658

Russellville is an unincorporated community in Upper Oxford Township in Chester County, Pennsylvania, United States. Russellville is located at the intersection of state routes 10 and 896.
