= Homeville, Chester County, Pennsylvania =

Unincorporated community in Pennsylvania, US

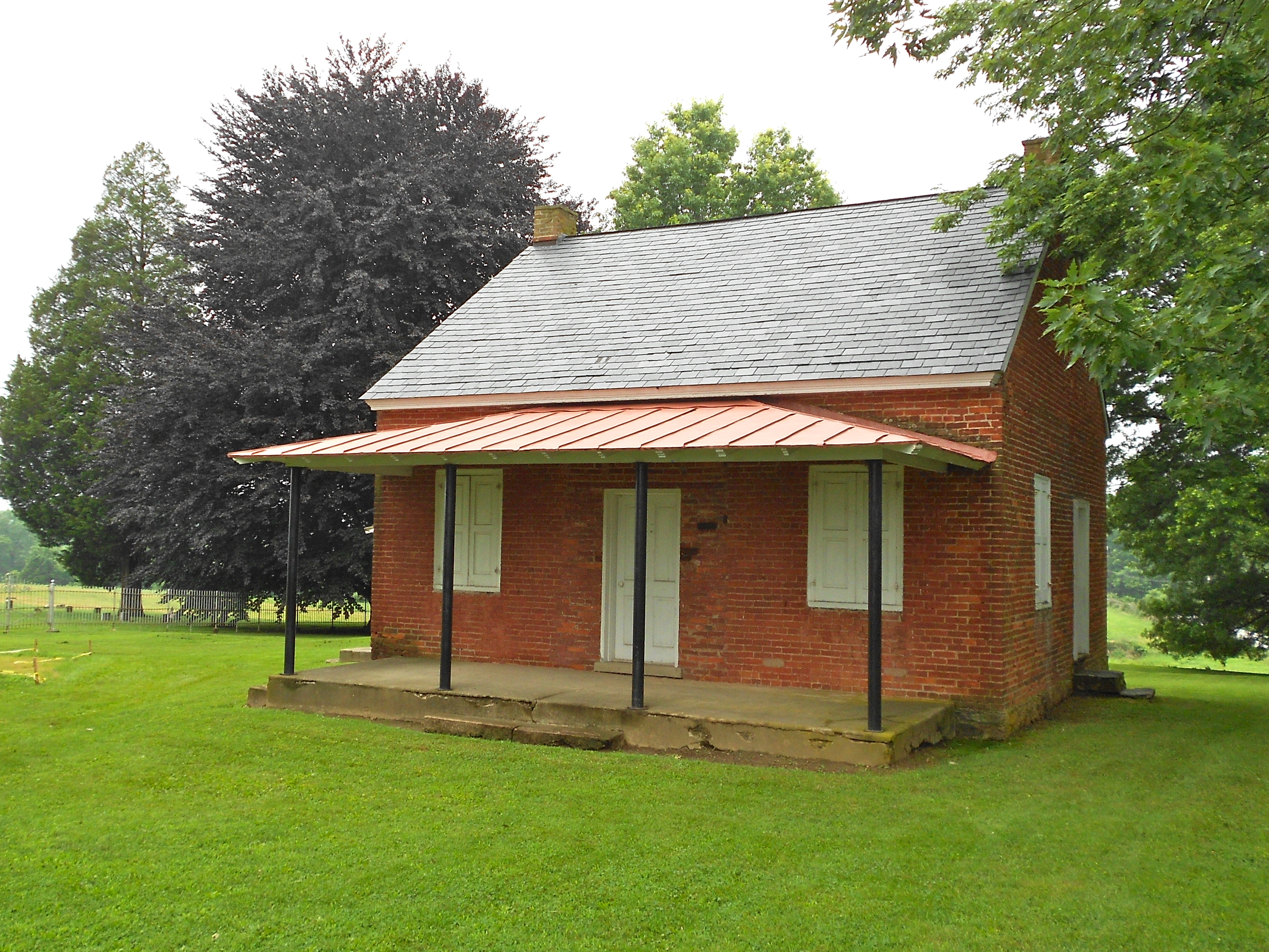
- Homeville Friends Meeting House

- Location in Pennsylvania Homeville (the United States)
- Coordinates: 39°51′39″N 75°59′12″W
- Country: United States
- State: Pennsylvania
- County: Chester
- Township: Upper Oxford
- Elevation: 469 ft (143 m)
- Time zone: UTC-5 (Eastern (EST))
  - Summer (DST): UTC-4 (EDT)
- ZIP codes: 19330
- Area code: 717
- FIPS code: 42-35472
- GNIS feature ID: 1177329

Homeville is a populated place situated in Upper Oxford Township in Chester County, Pennsylvania, United States. It has an estimated elevation of 469 feet (143 m) above sea level.

== Homeville Friends Meeting House ==
Built in 1839 and founded as the Oxford Preparative Meeting sponsored by the Fallowfield Monthly Meeting. In 1842 the meeting joined Pennsgrove Preparative Meeting to form Pennsgrove Monthly Meeting. The meeting was "laid down" or closed in 1915, but meetings for worship are sometimes held during the summer. The Homeville Cemetery Co.maintains the building and large burial ground.
