= Rudolph and Arthur Covered Bridge =

- Formerly listed on the U.S. National Register of Historic Places
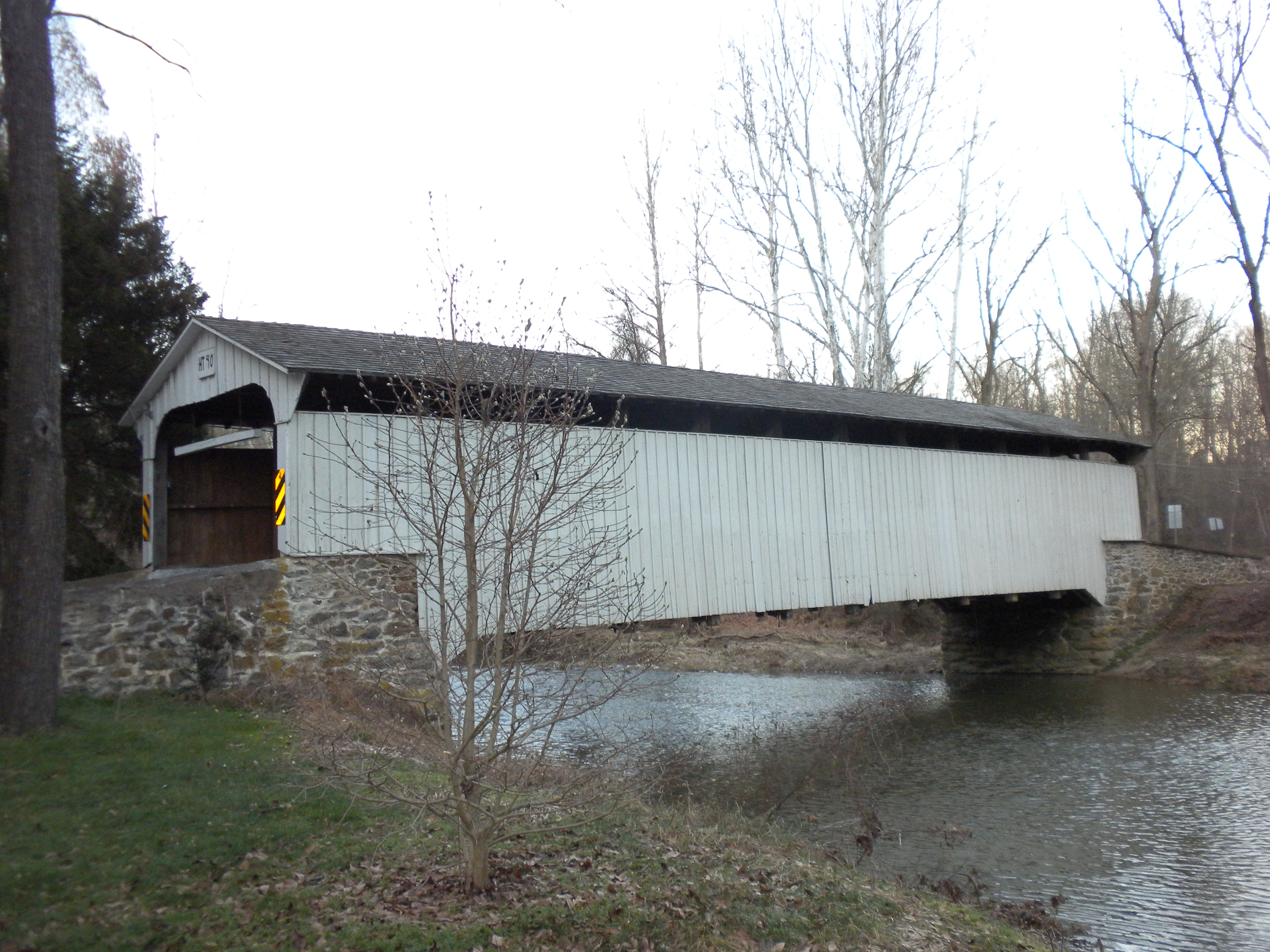
- Rudolph and Arthur Covered Bridge, December 2009

- Location within Pennsylvania Location within the United States
- Location: North of Lewisville on Township 307 near West Grove, Elk Township and New London Township, Pennsylvania
- Coordinates: 39°44′45″N 75°52′57″W
- Area: less than one acre
- Built: 1880
- Built by: Meanander Wood, Richard T. Meredith
- Architectural style: Burr truss
- MPS: Covered Bridges of Chester County TR
- NRHP reference No.: 80003473

Significant dates
- Added to NRHP: December 10, 1980
- Removed from NRHP: December 12, 2022

The Rudolph and Arthur Covered Bridge was an historic wooden covered bridge that was located in Elk Township and New London Township, Chester County, Pennsylvania, United States.

It was listed on the National Register of Historic Places in 1980, and was delisted in 2022.

The Rudolph and Arthur Bridge, which was destroyed by remnants of Hurricane Ida on September 1, 2021, was rebuilt and the re-opening ceremony was held on October 15, 2025.

== History and architectural features ==
An 80-foot-long (24 m) Burr truss bridge that was erected in 1880, it had vertical planking and eave-level window openings, and crossed Big Elk Creek.
