= Elk Township, Chester County, Pennsylvania =

Township in Pennsylvania, US

Elk Township
- Township
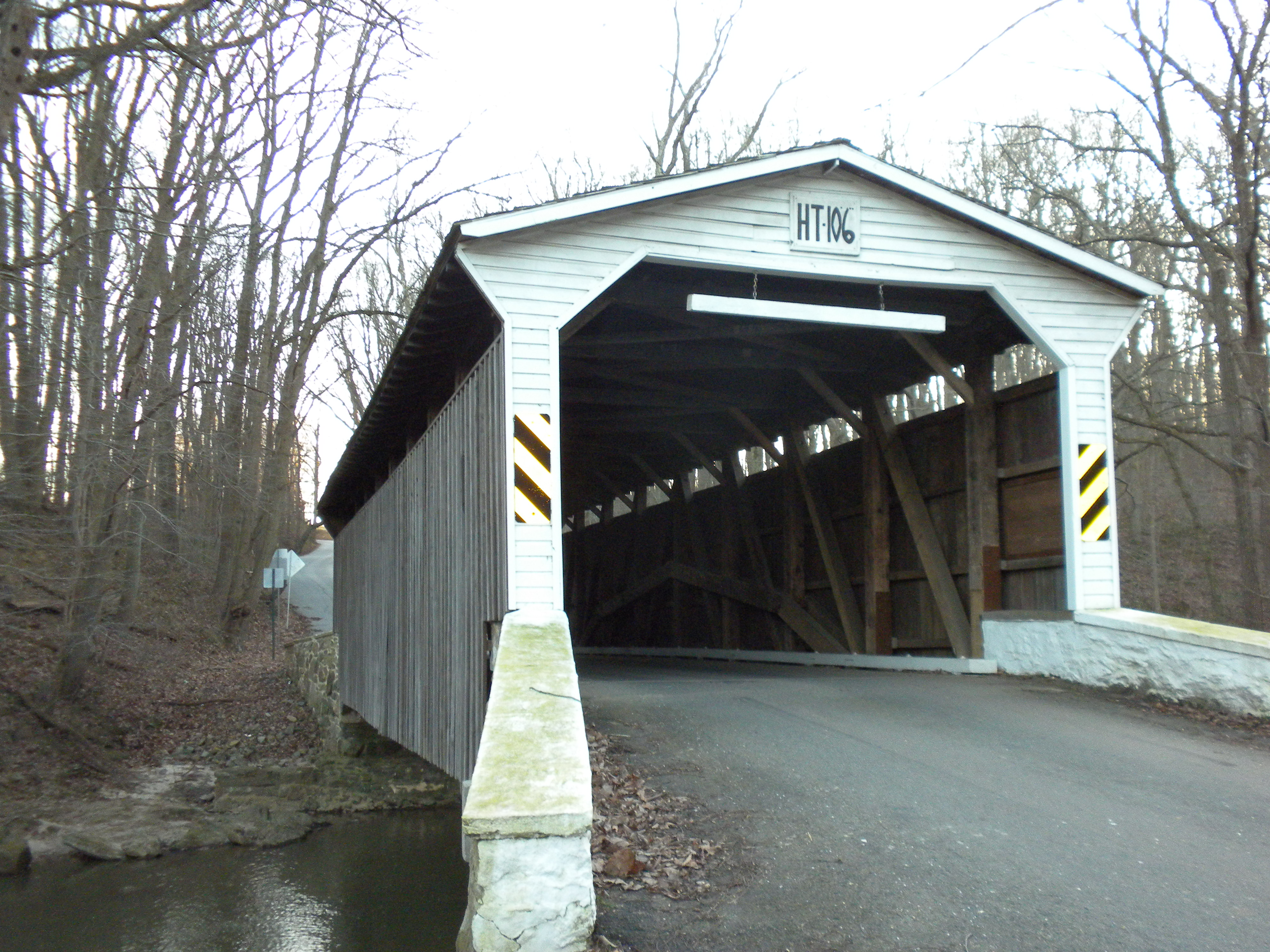
- Glen Hope Covered Bridge

- Location of Elk Township in Chester County (left) and of Chester County in Pennsylvania (right)
- Coordinates: 39°43′30″N 75°51′59″W
- Country: United States
- State: Pennsylvania
- County: Chester

Area
  - Total: 10.12 sq mi (26.22 km^{2})
  - Land: 10.05 sq mi (26.03 km^{2})
  - Water: 0.073 sq mi (0.19 km^{2})
- Elevation: 390 ft (120 m)

Population (2010)
  - Total: 1,681
  - Estimate (2016): 1,694
  - Density: 168.5/sq mi (65.07/km^{2})
- Time zone: UTC-5 (EST)
  - Summer (DST): UTC-4 (EDT)
- Area codes: 610, 484, and 835
- FIPS code: 42-029-23032
- Website: www.elktownship.org

Elk Township is a township in Chester County, Pennsylvania, United States. The population was 1,681 at the 2010 census.

== Geography ==
According to the U.S. Census Bureau, the township has a total area of 10.2 square miles (26 km^{2}), all of which is land.

== History ==
The Rudolph and Arthur Covered Bridge, Linton Stephens Covered Bridge, and Glen Hope Covered Bridge are listed on the National Register of Historic Places.

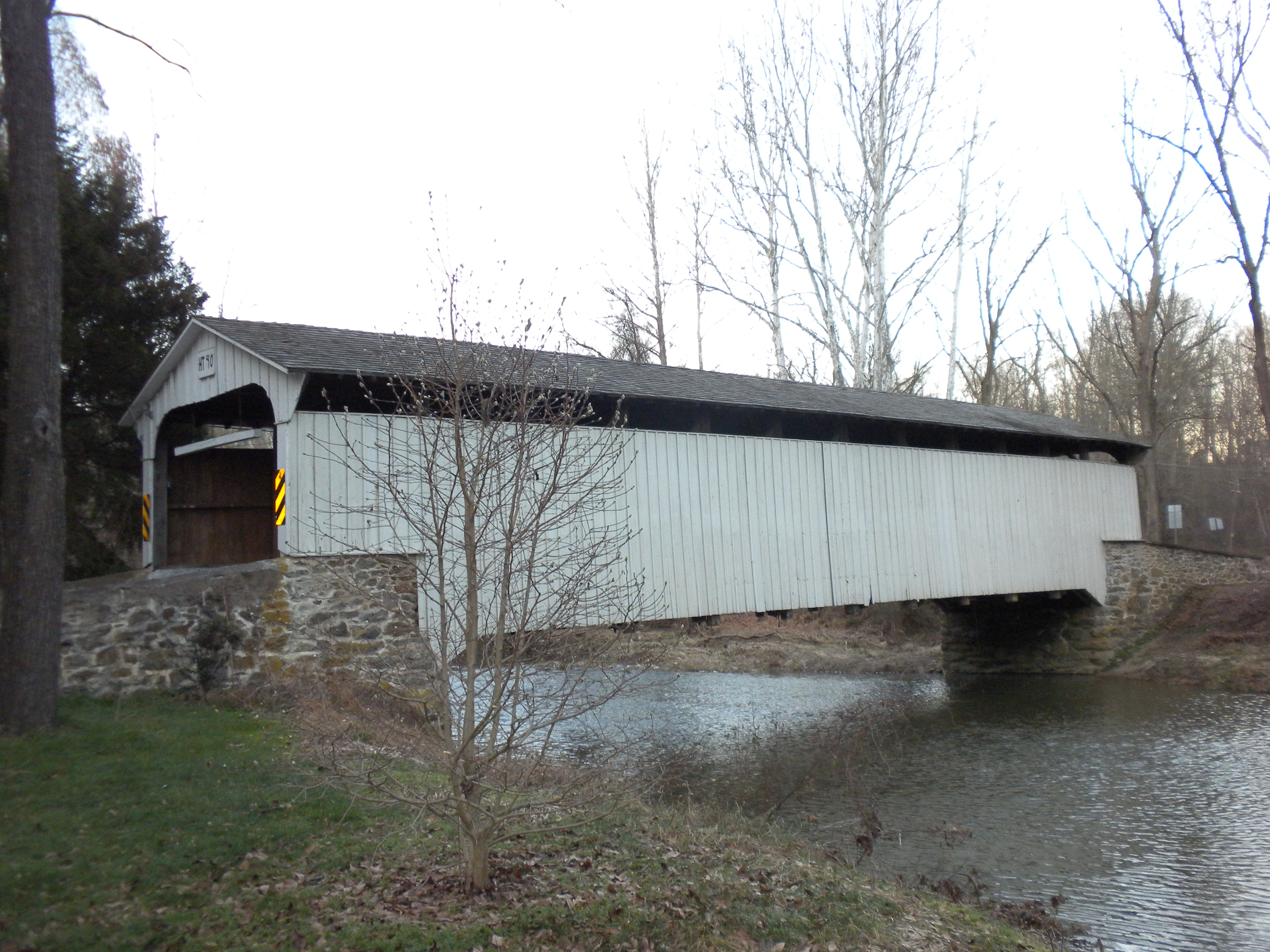
Rudolph and Arthur Covered Bridge

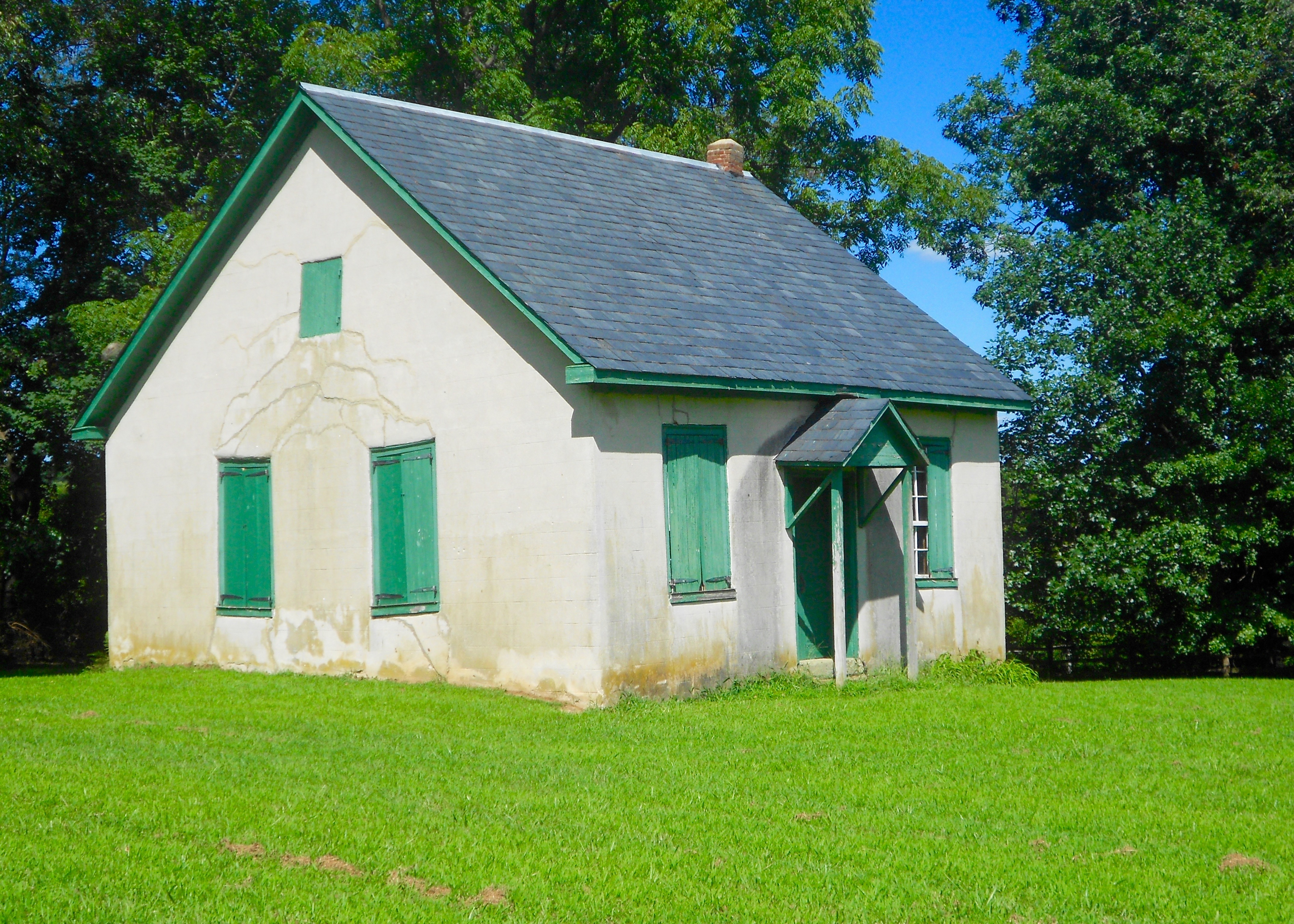
Little Elk Friends Meeting, built 1826

== Demographics ==
Historical population
Census	Pop.	Note	%±
1930	404		—
1940	457		13.1%
1950	462		1.1%
1960	539		16.7%
1970	649		20.4%
1980	750		15.6%
1990	1,129		50.5%
2000	1,485		31.5%
2010	1,681		13.2%
2020	1,698		1.0%

At the 2010 census, the township was 89.9% non-Hispanic White, 1.6% Black or African American, 0.5% Native American, 1.2% Asian, and 1.4% were two or more races. 5.7% of the population were of Hispanic or Latino ancestry.

At the 2000 census there were 1,485 people, 515 households, and 410 families living in the township. The population density was 145.2 inhabitants per square mile (56.1/km^{2}). There were 527 housing units at an average density of 51.5 per square mile (19.9/km^{2}). The racial makeup of the township was 96.90% White, 0.81% African American, 0.13% Asian, 0.81% from other races, and 1.35% from two or more races. Hispanic or Latino of any race were 3.64%.

There were 515 households, 40.4% had children under the age of 18 living with them, 68.5% were married couples living together, 7.8% had a female householder with no husband present, and 20.2% were non-families. 16.3% of households were made up of individuals, and 5.0% were one person aged 65 or older. The average household size was 2.88 and the average family size was 3.26.

The age distribution was 29.8% under the age of 18, 5.3% from 18 to 24, 32.6% from 25 to 44, 24.4% from 45 to 64, and 7.9% 65 or older. The median age was 36 years. For every 100 females, there were 99.9 males. For every 100 females age 18 and over, there were 99.2 males.

The median household income was $60,380 and the median family income was $70,104. Males had a median income of $46,635 versus $30,179 for females. The per capita income for the township was $24,604. About 2.8% of families and 3.8% of the population were below the poverty line, including 3.3% of those under age 18 and 3.4% of those age 65 or over.

== Transportation ==
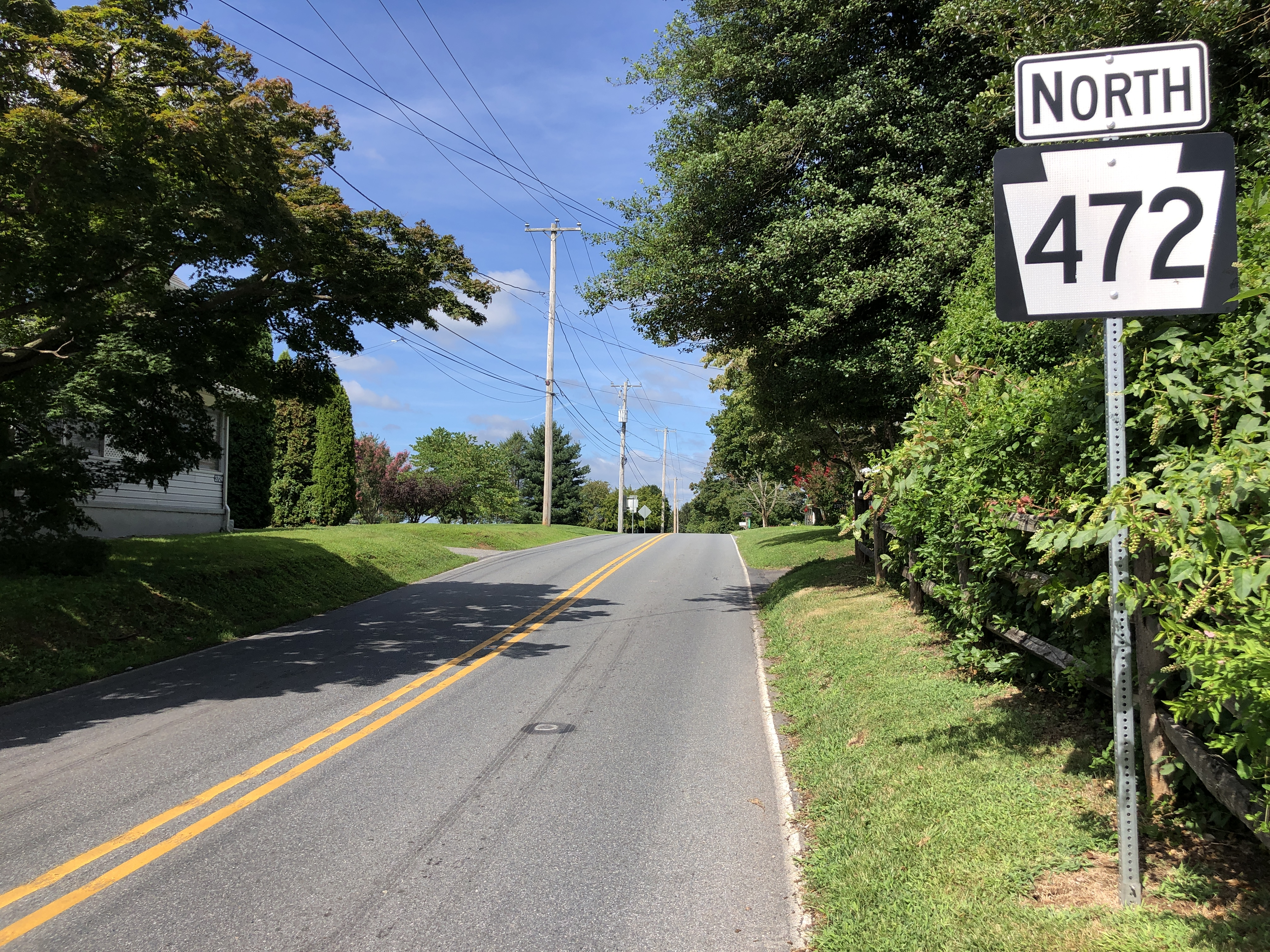
PA 472 northbound in Elk Township

As of 2020, there were 27.61 miles (44.43 km) of public roads in Elk Township, of which 11.77 miles (18.94 km) were maintained by the Pennsylvania Department of Transportation (PennDOT) and 15.84 miles (25.49 km) were maintained by the township.

Pennsylvania Route 472 and Pennsylvania Route 841 are the numbered roads serving Elk Township. PA 472 follows Hickory Hill Road and Lewisville Road along a northwest–southeast alignment through the center of the township. PA 841 follows Chesterville Road along a north–south alignment through the eastern portion of the township.

== Education ==
It is in the Oxford Area School District.
