= Thompson Farm (London Britain Township, Pennsylvania) =

- U.S. National Register of Historic Places
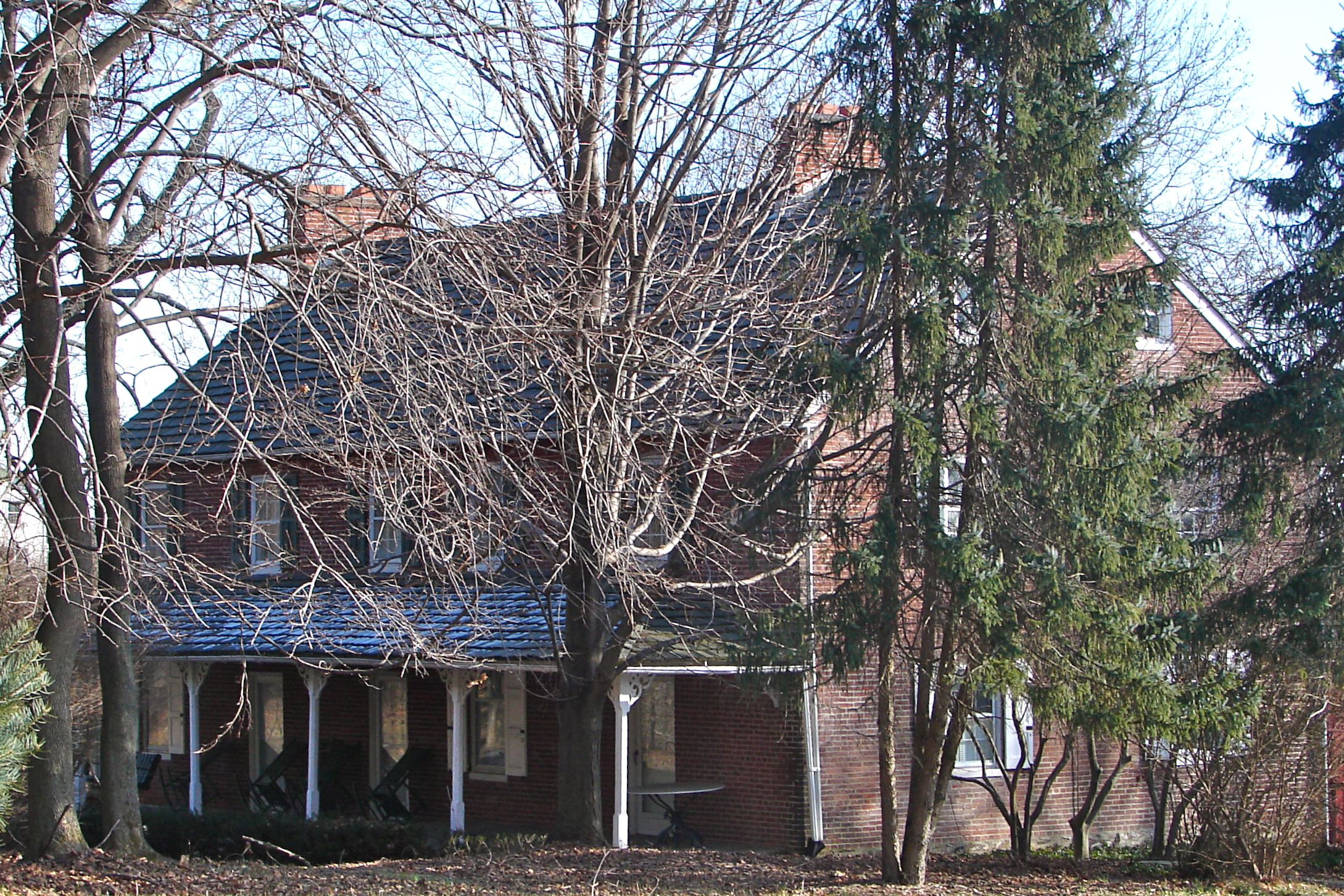
- Thompsons Farmhouse, December 2010

- Location within Pennsylvania Location within the United States
- Location: 632 Chambers Rock Road near New London, London Britain Township, Pennsylvania
- Coordinates: 39°43′54″N 75°46′57″W
- Area: 10 acres (4.0 ha)
- Built: c. 1800, 1833, 1857
- Architectural style: Federal
- NRHP reference No.: 83002228
- Added to NRHP: July 14, 1983

Thompson Farm, also known as the Pierson Farm, is a historic home and farm located in London Britain Township, Chester County, Pennsylvania. It has five contributing buildings: a brick farmhouse, a stone and frame bank barn (c. 1800), frame outhouse, chicken house, and corn crib. The farmhouse was built in 1833, and expanded in 1857.

It was added to the National Register of Historic Places in 1983.
