= New London Township, Pennsylvania =

Township in Pennsylvania, US

New London Township
- Township
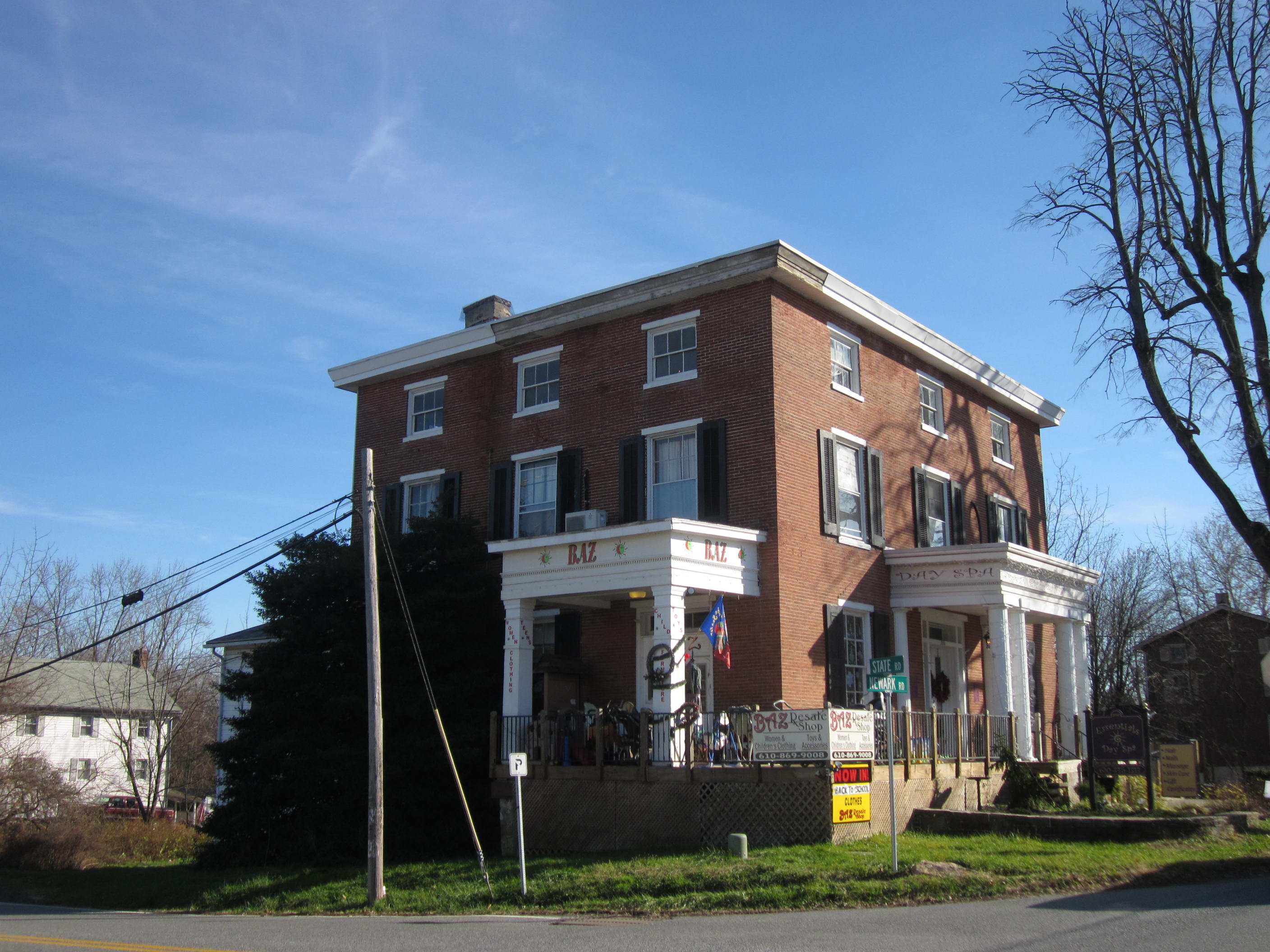
- New London Township

- Location in Chester County and the state of Pennsylvania.

- Location of Pennsylvania in the United States
- Coordinates: 39°46′00″N 75°52′59″W
- Country: United States
- State: Pennsylvania
- County: Chester

Area
  - Total: 11.74 sq mi (30.41 km^{2})
  - Land: 11.65 sq mi (30.18 km^{2})
  - Water: 0.089 sq mi (0.23 km^{2})
- Elevation: 337 ft (103 m)

Population (2020)
  - Total: 5,810
  - Density: 499/sq mi (193/km^{2})
- Time zone: UTC-5 (EST)
  - Summer (DST): UTC-4 (EDT)
- ZIP codes: 19352, 19360
- Area codes: 610 and 484
- FIPS code: 42-029-53816
- Website: www.newlondontwp.net

New London Township is a township that is located in Chester County, Pennsylvania, United States. It was the birthplace of U.S. Founding Father Thomas McKean.

The population was 5,810 at the time of the 2020 census.

== History ==
New London Township was chartered in 1723. The Rudolph and Arthur Covered Bridge and Linton Stephens Covered Bridge are listed on the National Register of Historic Places.

== Geography ==
According to the United States Census Bureau, the township has a total area of 11.9 square miles (31 km^{2}), all land.

== Demographics ==
Historical population
| Census | Pop. | Note | %± |
|---|---|---|---|
| 1930 | 576 | | — |
| 1940 | 624 | | 8.3% |
| 1950 | 660 | | 5.8% |
| 1960 | 845 | | 28.0% |
| 1970 | 938 | | 11.0% |
| 1980 | 1,312 | | 39.9% |
| 1990 | 2,721 | | 107.4% |
| 2000 | 4,583 | | 68.4% |
| 2010 | 5,631 | | 22.9% |
| 2020 | 5,810 | | 3.2% |
2020

At the 2010 census, the township was 91.9% non-Hispanic White, 1.4% Black or African American, 0.9% Asian, and 1.4% were two or more races. 4.9% of the population were of Hispanic or Latino ancestry.

As of the census of 2000, there were 4,583 people, 1,365 households, and 1,205 families living in the township. The population density was 386.5 inhabitants per square mile (149.2/km^{2}). There were 1,390 housing units at an average density of 117.2 per square mile (45.3/km^{2}). The racial makeup of the township was 96.68% White, 0.96% African American, 0.09% Native American, 0.65% Asian, 0.04% Pacific Islander, 0.89% from other races, and 0.68% from two or more races. Hispanic or Latino of any race were 2.38% of the population.

There were 1,365 households, out of which 59.6% had children under the age of 18 living with them, 80.7% were married couples living together, 4.9% had a female householder with no husband present, and 11.7% were non-families. 8.9% of all households were made up of individuals, and 2.7% had someone living alone who was 65 years of age or older. The average household size was 3.36 and the average family size was 3.60.

In the township the population was spread out, with 37.6% under the age of 18, 5.0% from 18 to 24, 33.3% from 25 to 44, 19.6% from 45 to 64, and 4.6% who were 65 years of age or older. The median age was 34 years. For every 100 females, there were 99.0 males. For every 100 females age 18 and over, there were 98.2 males.

The median income for a household in the township was $77,468, and the median income for a family was $79,929. Males had a median income of $60,298 versus $37,727 for females. The per capita income for the township was $24,824. About 1.4% of families and 2.0% of the population were below the poverty line, including 1.0% of those under age 18 and none of those age 65 or over.

== Notable person ==
- Thomas McKean (1734–1817), lawyer, politician and Founding Father of the United States

== Transportation ==
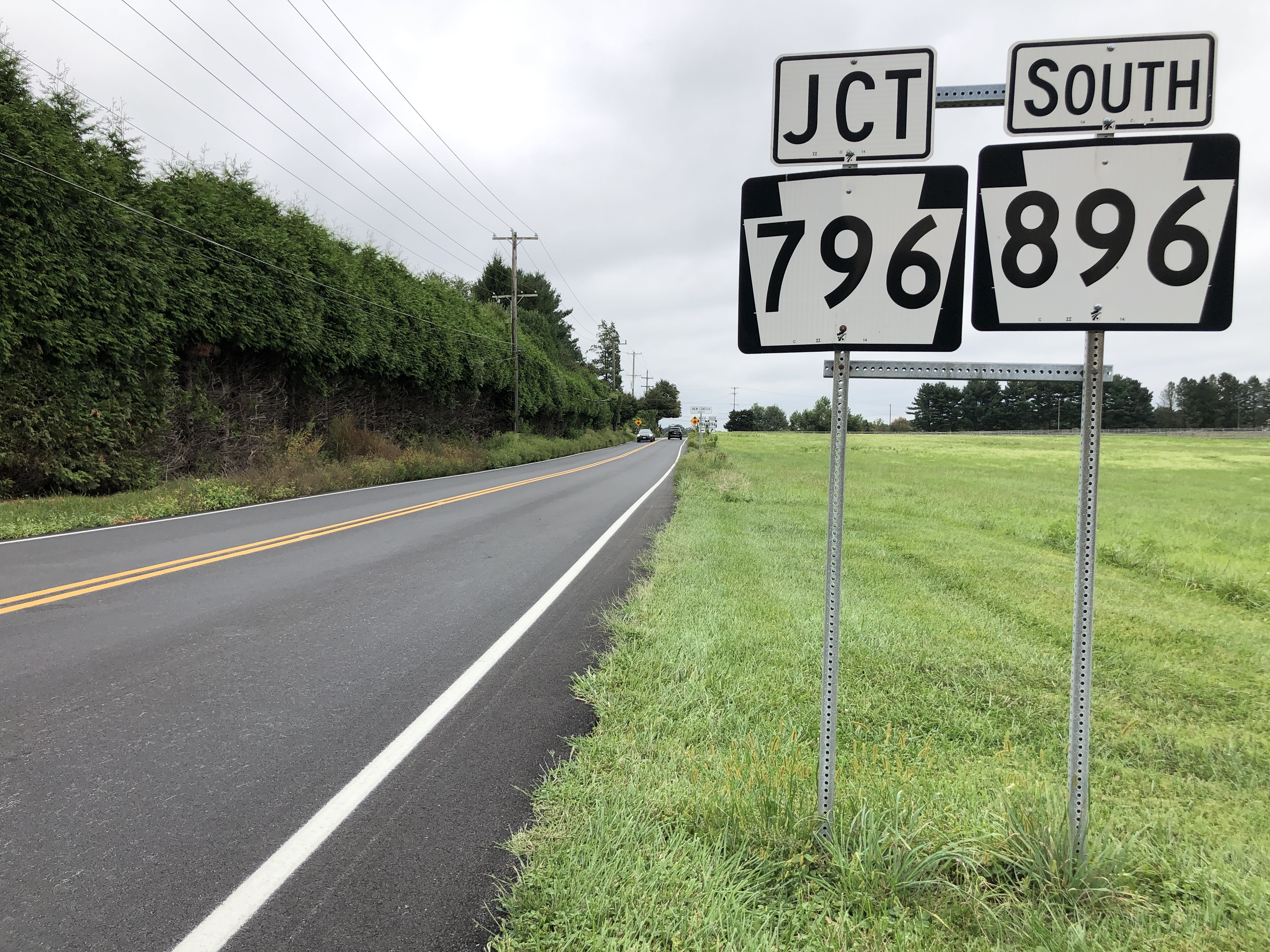
PA 896 southbound approaching PA 796 in New London Township

As of 2020, there were 53.01 miles (85.31 km) of public roads in New London Township, of which 4.27 miles (6.87 km) were maintained by the Pennsylvania Department of Transportation (PennDOT) and 48.74 miles (78.44 km) were maintained by the township.

Pennsylvania Route 796, Pennsylvania Route 841 and Pennsylvania Route 896 are the numbered highways serving New London Township. PA 896 follows Newark Road along a northwest–southeast alignment across the northern and eastern portions of the township. PA 841 follows Chesterville Road along a southwest–northeast alignment across the southern portion of the township. Finally, PA 796 starts at PA 896 and heads northward along Jennersville Road in the northern portion of the township.
