= Linton Stephens Covered Bridge =

- U.S. National Register of Historic Places
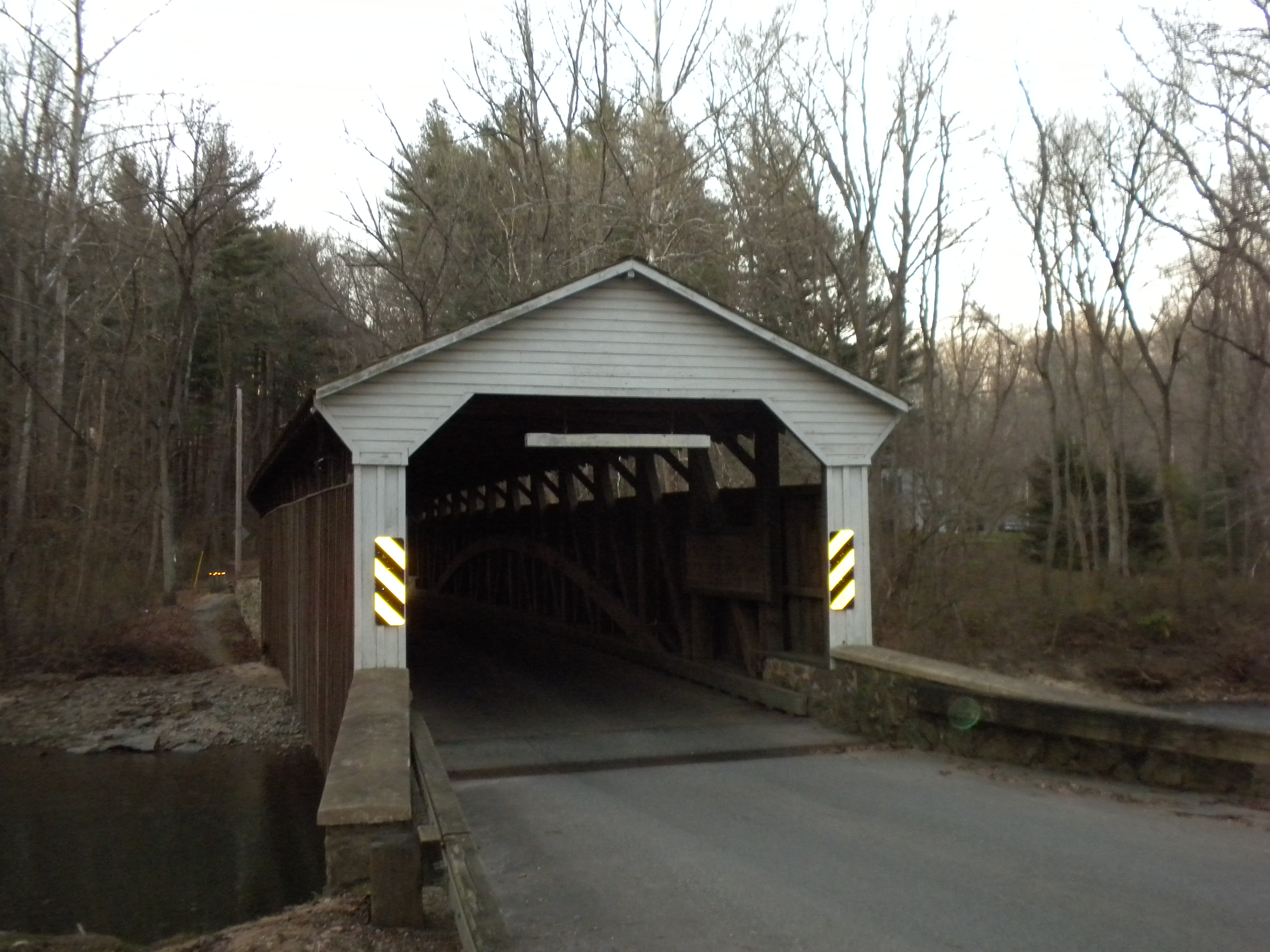
- Linton Stephens Covered Bridge, December 2009

- Location within Pennsylvania Location within the United States
- Location: Southwest of New London on Township 344 (Kings Row Road), Elk Township and New London Township, Pennsylvania
- Coordinates: 39°45′23″N 75°54′46″W
- Area: less than one acre
- Built: 1886
- Architectural style: Burr truss
- MPS: Covered Bridges of Chester County TR
- NRHP reference No.: 80003466
- Added to NRHP: December 10, 1980

The Linton Stephens Covered Bridge; also known as the Linton Stevens Covered Bridge, is a historic, wooden covered bridge in Elk Township and New London Township, Chester County, Pennsylvania, United States.

It was listed on the National Register of Historic Places in 1980.

== History and architectural features ==
A 102-foot-long (31 m), Burr truss bridge that was built in 1886, is historic structure crosses Big Elk Creek. The bridge was damaged and closed by flooding caused by Hurricane Ida on September 1, 2021.
