= Lunn's Tavern =

- U.S. National Register of Historic Places
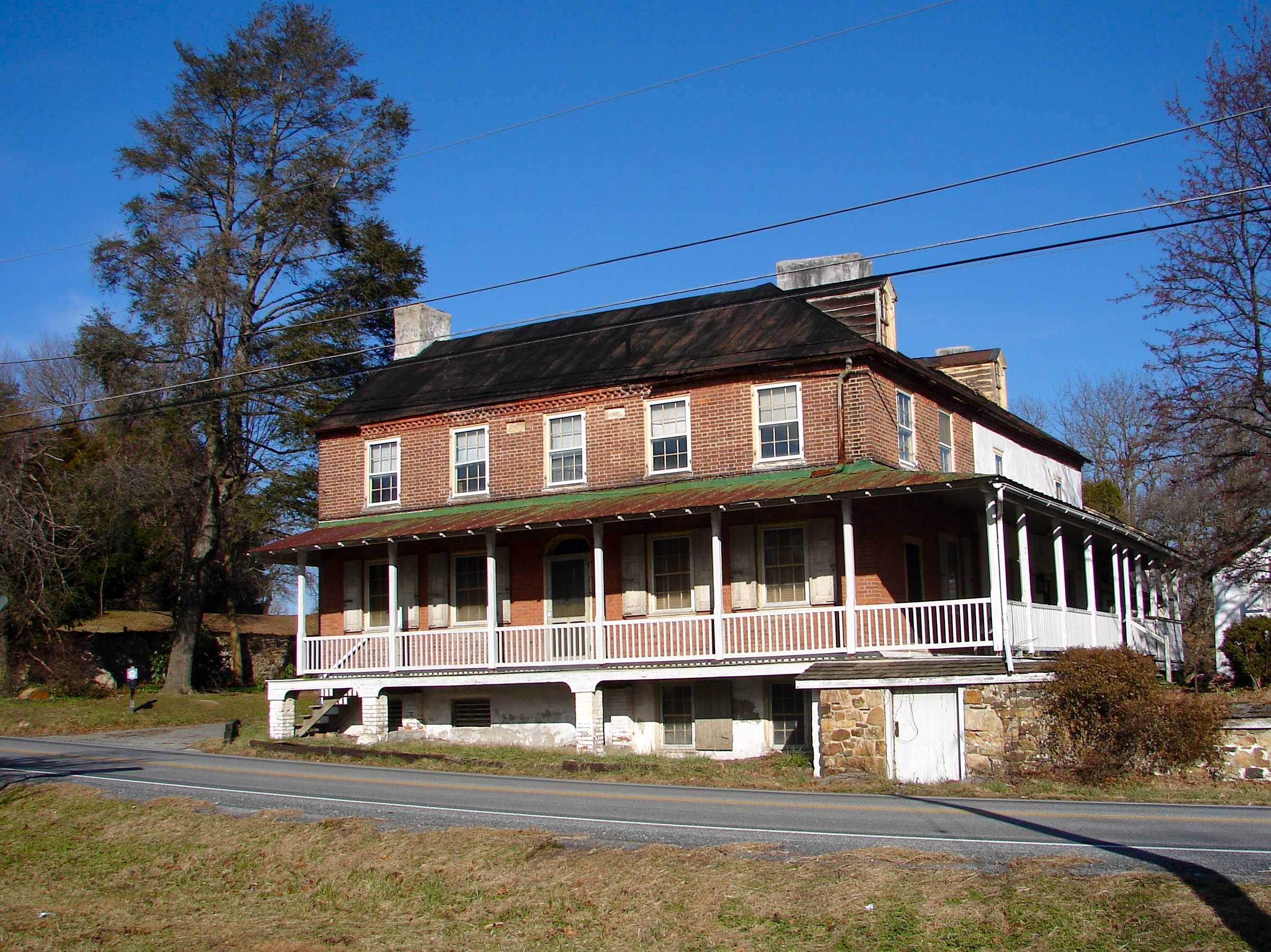
- Lunn's Tavern, December 2010

- Location within Pennsylvania Location within the United States
- Location: Pennsylvania Route 896 at Strickersville, London Britain Township, Pennsylvania
- Coordinates: 39°44′6″N 75°47′38″W
- Area: 0.1 acres (0.040 ha)
- Built: c. 1760
- NRHP reference No.: 79002204
- Added to NRHP: October 25, 1979

Lunn's Tavern, also known as The Wilkins Property, is an historic inn and tavern which is located in London Britain Township, Chester County, Pennsylvania.

It was added to the National Register of Historic Places in 1979.

== History and architectural features ==
This historic building has three sections. The original section was built circa 1760, and is a two-story, stone structure with a gambrel roof.

Part of the original section was altered when the brick addition was made in 1830. The modifications included adding stucco to the stone exterior walls and modifying the roof to the gable style. The 1830 brick addition has a wooden porch structure. It was the site of the writing of a famous letter from Thomas McKean to George Read on September 26, 1777, detailing the situation in Delaware and his actions upon assuming the presidency of the State of Delaware.
