= London Britain Township, Pennsylvania =

Township in Pennsylvania, US

London Britain Township
- Township
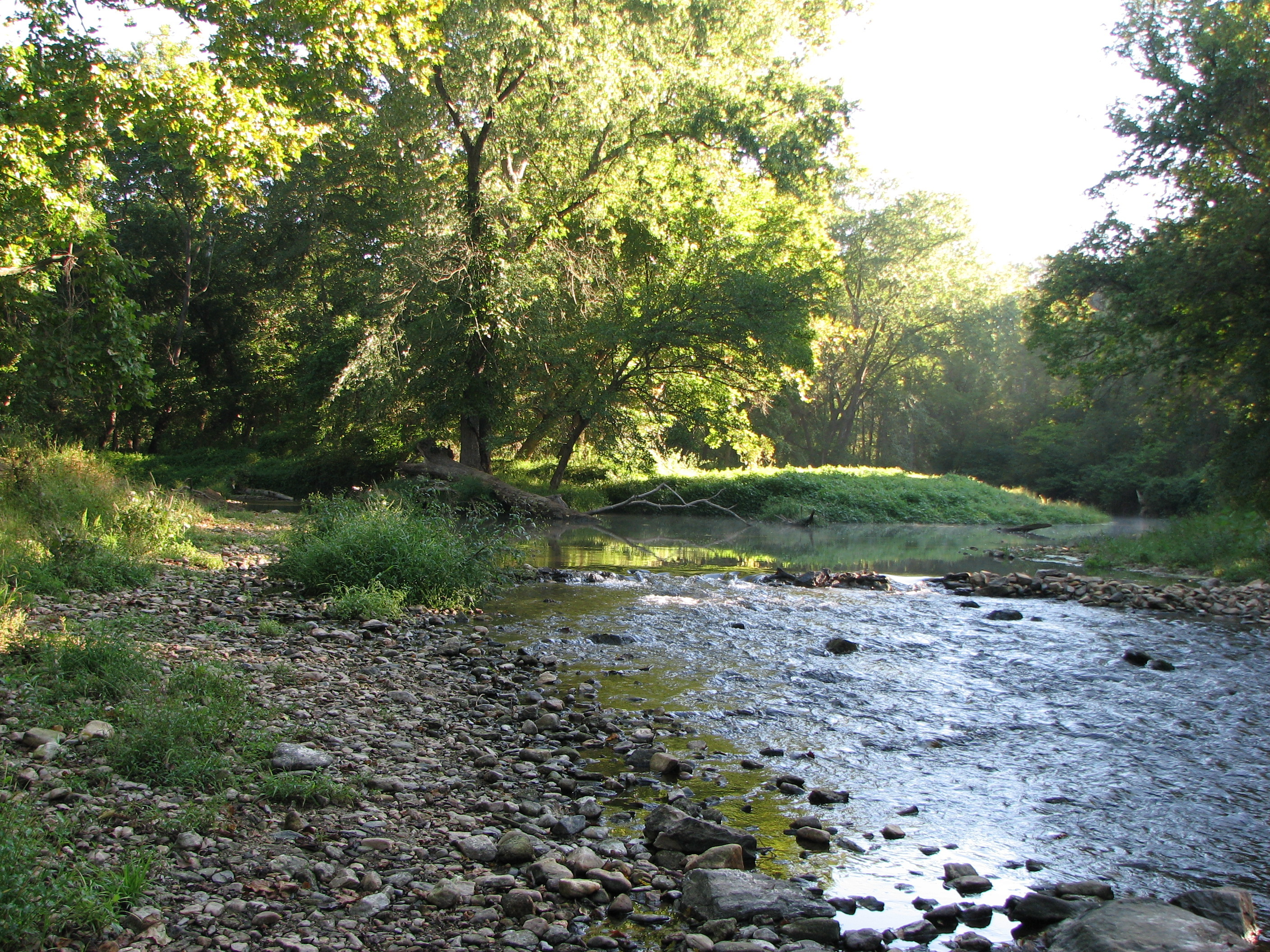
- White Clay Creek Preserve is a PA state park in London Britain Township

- Location in Chester County and the state of Pennsylvania.

- Location of Pennsylvania in the United States
- Coordinates: 39°45′09″N 75°46′48″W
- Country: United States
- State: Pennsylvania
- County: Chester

Area
  - Total: 9.79 sq mi (25.35 km^{2})
  - Land: 9.70 sq mi (25.12 km^{2})
  - Water: 0.089 sq mi (0.23 km^{2})
- Elevation: 138 ft (42 m)

Population (2010)
  - Total: 3,139
  - Estimate (2016): 3,255
  - Density: 335.6/sq mi (129.59/km^{2})
- Time zone: UTC-5 (EST)
  - Summer (DST): UTC-4 (EDT)
- ZIP code: 19350
- Area codes: 610 and 484
- FIPS code: 42-029-44440
- Website: www.londonbritaintownship-pa.gov

London Britain Township is a township in Chester County, Pennsylvania, United States. The population was 3,139 at the 2010 census. White Clay Creek Preserve is a Pennsylvania state park in London Britain Township, along White Clay Creek.

== History ==
On March 14, 1681, William Penn received a charter from the King of England for a grant of land to establish a colony in the New World. This colony was named Pennsylvania, or Penn's Woods. The Township of London Britain was organized in 1725 from a tract of land belonging to the London Company of Great Britain. The southernmost part of the township was originally disputed territory between Pennsylvania and Maryland, resolved eventually by the Mason–Dixon line. The southernmost section of the township formed the northern section of New Munster, a large settlement tract established by Maryland and named after the southern province of Munster in Ireland. New Munster acted as an early genesis point and catalyst for large Scotch-Irish settlement and expansion into Chester County and points west in Pennsylvania.

Lunn's Tavern and the Thompson Farm are listed on the National Register of Historic Places.

== Geography ==
According to the United States Census Bureau, the township has a total area of 9.9 square miles (26 km^{2}), all land. London Britain is bordered by Maryland on the south and Delaware on the east. The Mason–Dixon line marks the border between the township and Maryland. The White Clay Creek Preserve makes up 1,255 acres (508 ha) of the township. The White Clay Creek watershed was designated as a National Wild and Scenic River on October 24, 2000.

== Demographics ==
Historical population
Census	Pop.	Note	%±
1930	455		—
1940	462		1.5%
1950	559		21.0%
1960	686		22.7%
1970	963		40.4%
1980	1,546		60.5%
1990	2,671		72.8%
2000	2,797		4.7%
2010	3,139		12.2%
2020	3,179		1.3%

At the 2010 census, the township was 93.5% non-Hispanic White, 1.3% Black or African American, 0.1% Native American, 1.4% Asian, and 1.5% were two or more races. 2.3% of the population were of Hispanic or Latino ancestry.

As of the census of 2000, there were 2,797 people, 957 households, and 829 families residing in the township. The population density was 283.4 inhabitants per square mile (109.4/km^{2}). There were 979 housing units at an average density of 99.2 per square mile (38.3/km^{2}). The racial makeup of the township was 96.53% White, 0.89% African American, 0.04% Native American, 0.93% Asian, 0.04% Pacific Islander, 0.39% from other races, and 1.18% from two or more races. Hispanic or Latino of any race were 1.68% of the population.

There were 957 households, out of which 43.7% had children under the age of 18 living with them, 81.0% were married couples living together, 3.6% had a female householder with no husband present, and 13.3% were non-families. 10.6% of all households were made up of individuals, and 2.9% had someone living alone who was 65 years of age or older. The average household size was 2.92 and the average family size was 3.15.

In the township the population was spread out, with 28.9% under the age of 18, 4.6% from 18 to 24, 26.4% from 25 to 44, 32.2% from 45 to 64, and 7.8% who were 65 years of age or older. The median age was 40 years. For every 100 females, there were 103.3 males. For every 100 females age 18 and over, there were 100.5 males.

The median income for a household in the township was $93,521, and the median income for a family was $97,013. Males had a median income of $66,600 versus $44,141 for females. The per capita income for the township was $35,761. About 2.1% of families and 1.7% of the population were below the poverty line, including 1.2% of those under age 18 and 4.1% of those age 65 or over.

== Climate ==
London Britain has a hot-summer humid continental climate (Dfa) bordering on a humid subtropical climate (Cfa). The hardiness zone is 7a.

Climate data for London Britain (Elevation: 167 ft (51 m)) 1981-2010 Averages
Month	Jan	Feb	Mar	Apr	May	Jun	Jul	Aug	Sep	Oct	Nov	Dec	Year
Mean daily maximum °F (°C)	40.4 (4.7)	43.4 (6.3)	52.2 (11.2)	64.1 (17.8)	73.6 (23.1)	82.5 (28.1)	86.7 (30.4)	85.0 (29.4)	77.9 (25.5)	66.6 (19.2)	55.5 (13.1)	44.3 (6.8)	64.4 (18.0)
Daily mean °F (°C)	31.9 (−0.1)	34.5 (1.4)	42.2 (5.7)	52.8 (11.6)	62.4 (16.9)	71.7 (22.1)	76.1 (24.5)	74.6 (23.7)	67.3 (19.6)	55.8 (13.2)	46.0 (7.8)	36.1 (2.3)	54.4 (12.4)
Mean daily minimum °F (°C)	23.5 (−4.7)	25.6 (−3.6)	32.2 (0.1)	41.5 (5.3)	51.3 (10.7)	61.0 (16.1)	65.6 (18.7)	64.2 (17.9)	56.8 (13.8)	44.9 (7.2)	36.4 (2.4)	27.9 (−2.3)	44.3 (6.8)
Average precipitation inches (mm)	3.30 (84)	2.79 (71)	4.21 (107)	3.72 (94)	4.18 (106)	4.05 (103)	4.66 (118)	3.66 (93)	4.48 (114)	3.49 (89)	3.50 (89)	3.73 (95)	45.77 (1,163)
Average relative humidity (%)	66.8	63.3	59.0	58.6	62.7	66.6	68.1	69.6	71.1	69.3	67.9	68.1	65.9
Average dew point °F (°C)	22.1 (−5.5)	23.3 (−4.8)	28.9 (−1.7)	38.7 (3.7)	49.5 (9.7)	60.0 (15.6)	64.8 (18.2)	64.0 (17.8)	57.6 (14.2)	45.9 (7.7)	36.0 (2.2)	26.6 (−3.0)	43.2 (6.2)
Source: PRISM

== Transportation ==
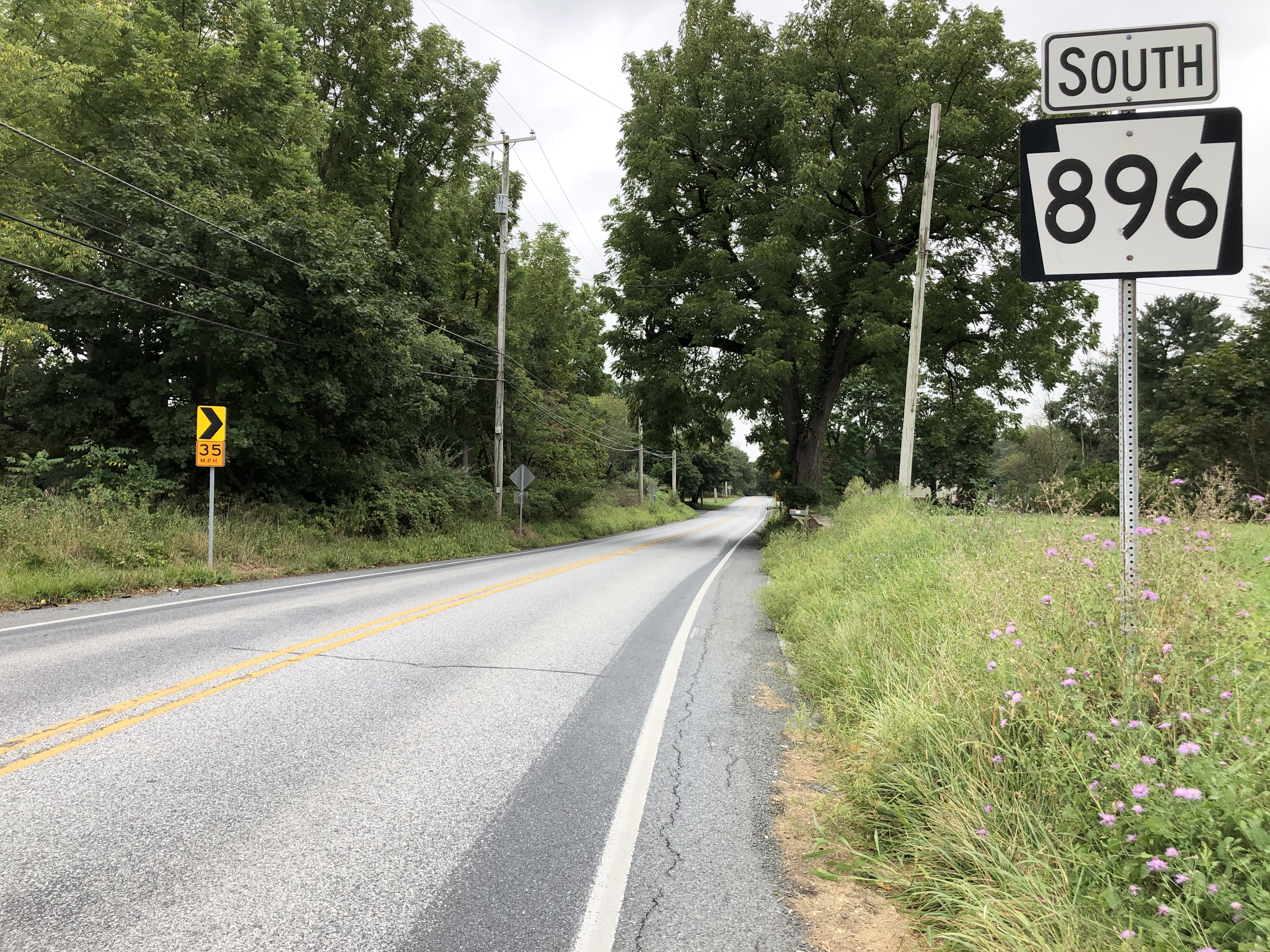
PA 896 southbound in London Britain Township

As of 2020, there were 42.70 miles (68.72 km) of public roads in London Britain Township, of which 2.61 miles (4.20 km) were maintained by the Pennsylvania Department of Transportation (PennDOT) and 40.09 miles (64.52 km) were maintained by the township.

Pennsylvania Route 896 is the only numbered highway serving London Britain Township. It follows New London Road along a northwest–southeast alignment across the southwestern portion of the township.
