= Little Elk Creek =

- Location of the mouth of Little Elk Creek

Location
- Country: United States
- State: New York
- County: Otsego

Physical characteristics
- Source
  - coordinates: 42°40′26″N 74°44′39″W
- Mouth: Elk Creek
  - coordinates: 42°36′36″N 74°49′03″W
  - elevation: 1,342 ft (409 m)

Little Elk Creek is a river in Otsego County, New York. It converges with Elk Creek south-southwest of Westford.
