= Upper Oxford Township, Pennsylvania =

Township in Pennsylvania, US

Upper Oxford Township
- Township
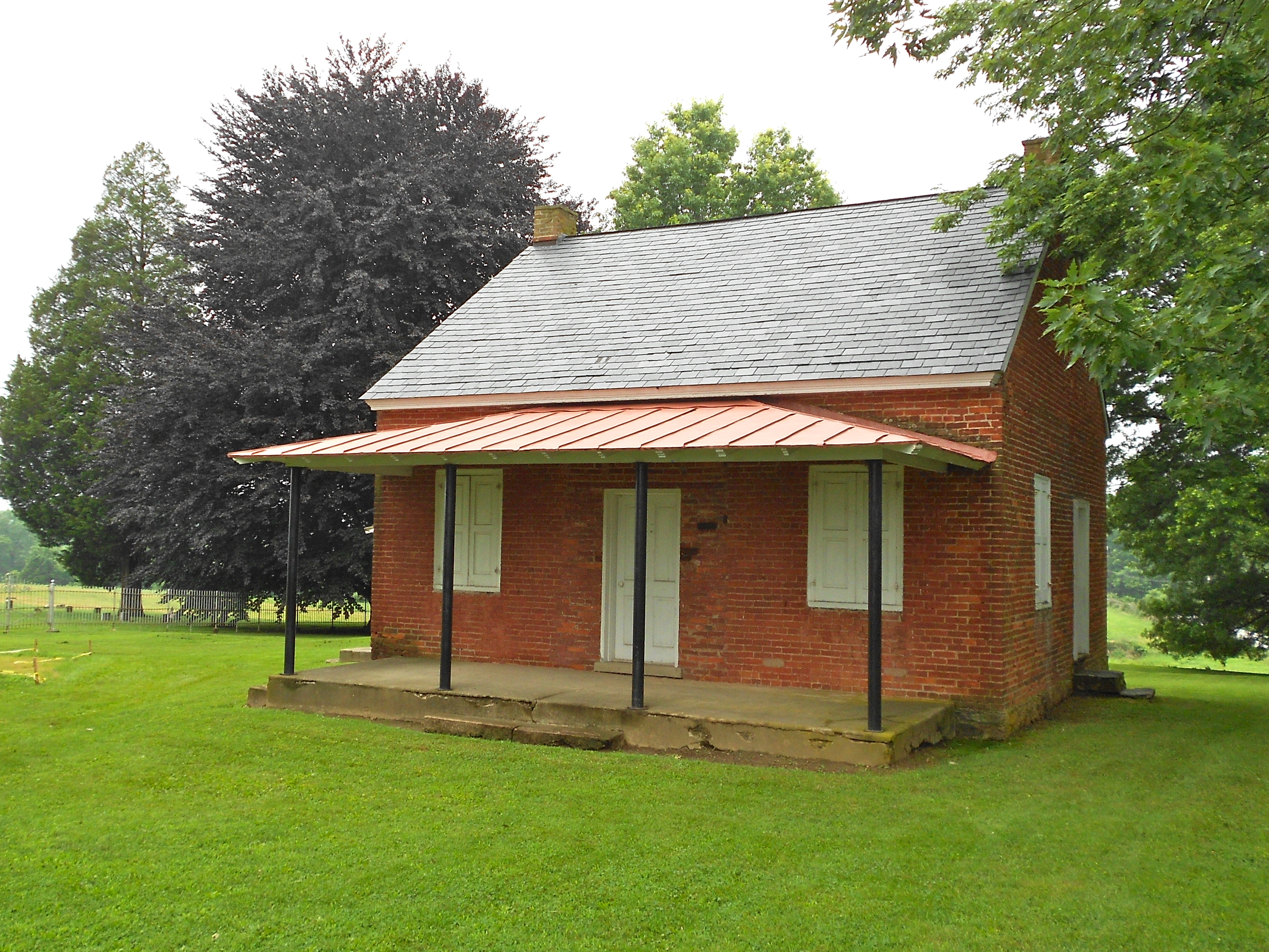
- Homeville Friends Meeting House in the township

- Location of Upper Oxford Township in Chester County and of Chester County in Pennsylvania

- Location of Pennsylvania in the United States
- Coordinates: 39°50′34″N 75°57′13″W
- Country: United States
- State: Pennsylvania
- County: Chester

Area
  - Total: 16.73 sq mi (43.34 km^{2})
  - Land: 16.64 sq mi (43.09 km^{2})
  - Water: 0.097 sq mi (0.25 km^{2})
- Elevation: 558 ft (170 m)

Population (2010)
  - Total: 2,484
  - Estimate (2016): 2,497
  - Density: 150.1/sq mi (57.95/km^{2})
- Time zone: UTC-5 (EST)
  - Summer (DST): UTC-4 (EDT)
- Area code: 610
- FIPS code: 42-029-79208
- Website: www.upperoxford.us

Upper Oxford Township is a township that is located in Chester County, Pennsylvania, United States. As of the 2010 census, the township had a population of 2,484.

== Geography ==
According to the U.S. Census Bureau, the township has a total area of 16.8 square miles (44 km^{2}), all land.

== Transportation ==
As of 2020, there were 51.34 miles (82.62 km) of public roads in Upper Oxford Township, of which 23.31 miles (37.51 km) were maintained by the Pennsylvania Department of Transportation (PennDOT) and 28.03 miles (45.11 km) were maintained by the township.

U.S. Route 1 is the most prominent highway serving Upper Oxford Township. It follows the Kennett–Oxford Bypass along a southwest–northeast alignment through the southeastern part of the township.

Pennsylvania Route 10 follows Limestone Road along a southwest–northeast alignment through the central portion of the township while Pennsylvania Route 896 follows Newark Road along a northwest–southeast alignment through the middle of the township.

== Demographics ==
Historical population
| Census | Pop. | Note | %± |
|---|---|---|---|
| 1930 | 780 | | — |
| 1940 | 859 | | 10.1% |
| 1950 | 903 | | 5.1% |
| 1960 | 997 | | 10.4% |
| 1970 | 1,136 | | 13.9% |
| 1980 | 1,332 | | 17.3% |
| 1990 | 1,615 | | 21.2% |
| 2000 | 2,095 | | 29.7% |
| 2010 | 2,484 | | 18.6% |
| 2020 | 2,560 | | 3.1% |

At the time of the 2010 census, this township was 86.1% non-Hispanic White, 7.8% Hispanic or Latino, 3.7% Black or African American, 0.4% Native American, and 0.3% Asian with 2.1% defined as two or more races.

At the ime of the 2000 census, there were 2,095 people, 725 households, and 584 families living in the township.

The population density was 124.8 inhabitants per square mile (48.2/km^{2}). There were 743 housing units at an average density of 44.3 per square mile (17.1/km^{2}).

The racial makeup of the township was 91.69% White, 3.68% African American, 0.38% Native American, 0.33% Asian, 2.43% from other races, and 1.48% from two or more races. Hispanic or Latino of any race were 2.67%.

There were 725 households, of which 40.6% had children who were under the age of eighteen living with them; 72.4% were married couples living together, 5.1% had a female householder with no husband present, and 19.4% were non-families. There were also 14.5% of households that were one-person households, of which 5.5% had residents who were aged sixty-five or older.

The average household size was 2.88 and the average family size was 3.24.

The age distribution was 29.1% of residents who were under the age of eighteen, 5.9% who were aged eighteen to twenty-four, 31.8% who were aged twenty-five to forty-four, 24.6% who were aged forty-five to sixty-four, and 8.6% who were aged sixty-five or older. The median age was thirty-six years.

For every one hundred females, there were 104.0 males. For every one hundred females who were aged eighteen or older, there were 103.6 males.

The median household income was $61,094 and the median family income was $66,875. Males had a median income of $43,594 compared with that of $30,990 for females.

The per capita income for the township was $24,641.

Approximately 3.9% of families and 4.9% of the population were living below the poverty line, including 5.5% of those who were under the age of eighteen and 6.9% of those who were aged sixty-five or older.

== Education ==
It is in the Oxford Area School District.

A portion of Lincoln University extends into the township.

== Gallery ==
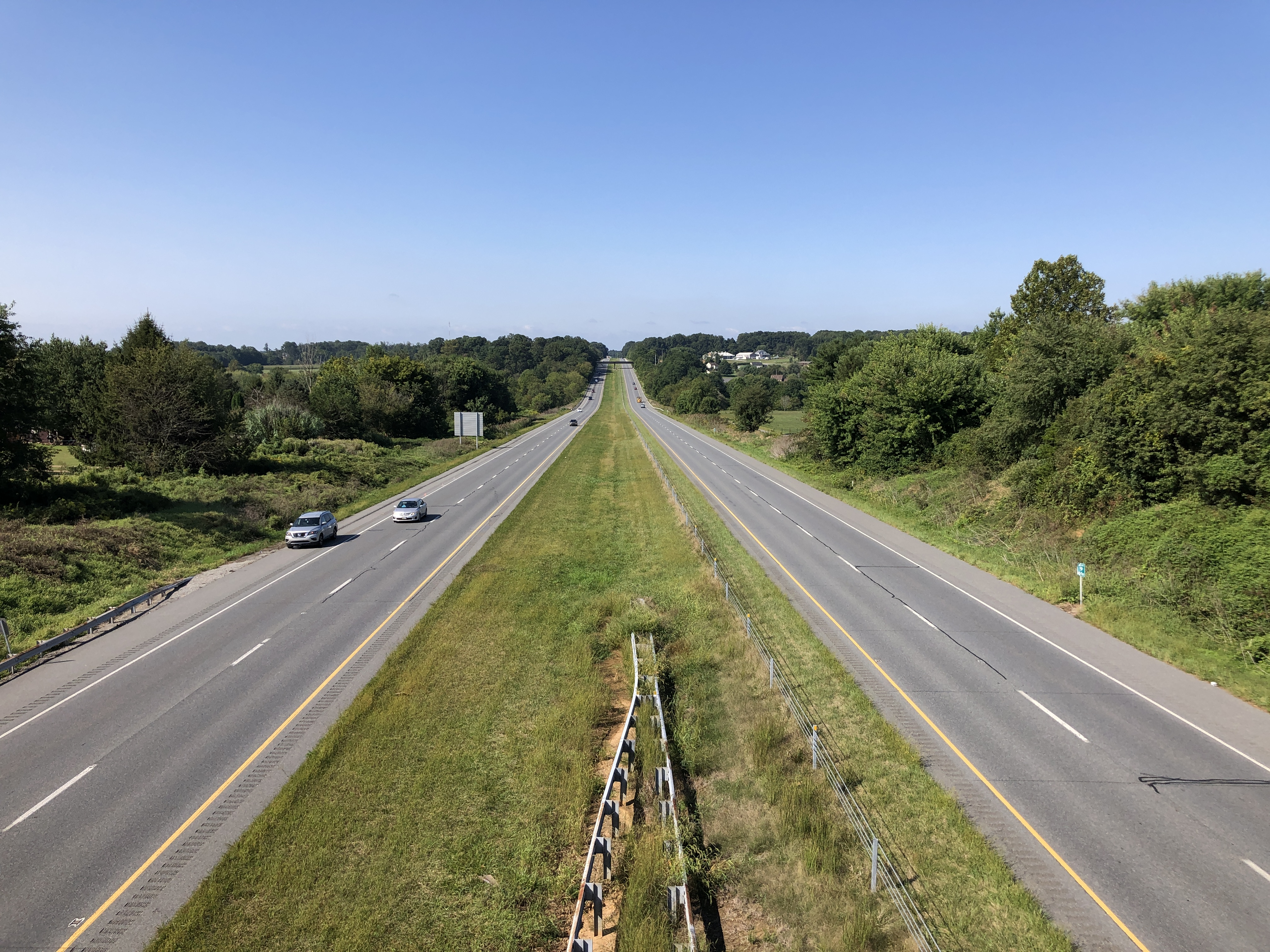
US 1 southbound in Upper Oxford Township
