= Willowdale, Pennsylvania =

Unincorporated community in Pennsylvania, US

- Unincorporated community
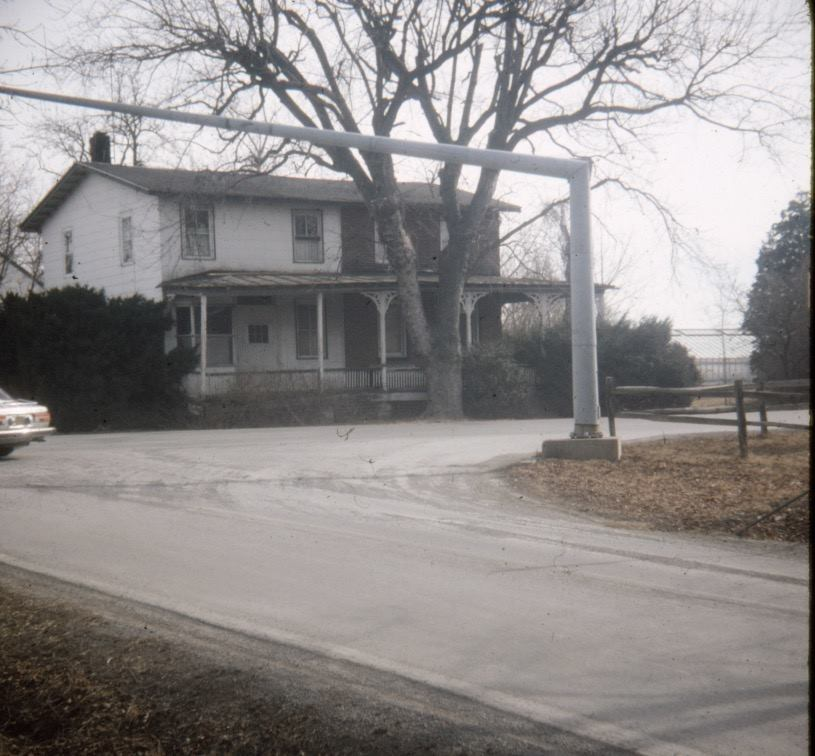
- Willowdale Post Office and General Store

- Location in Pennsylvania Location in United States
- Coordinates: 39°52′27″N 75°43′04″W
- Country: United States
- State: Pennsylvania
- County: Chester
- Township: East Marlborough
- Time zone: UTC-5 (Eastern (EST))
  - Summer (DST): UTC-4 (EDT)

Willowdale is an unincorporated community that is located in East Marlborough Township, in southern Chester County, Pennsylvania, United States.

It was named after a grove of Willow trees that grew in the general area when the community was originally settled. Several businesses, shopping centers and residential developments in the general area of the crossroads have since been named after Willowdale.

== History ==
=== 1700s ===
Originally, the crossroads in this area was called Taggarts Crossroads. It was named after the Taggart family, who owned a stone inn there. Built in 1730, that inn is still extant on the northwestern corner of the crossroads.

Another eighteenth-century house, a quaint fieldstone house that stands on the northeastern section of the crossroads, was once described in an article as the "Oldest House West of the Brandywine." While that description has since been proven to be inaccurate, due to the dating of other homesteads in the region, this fieldstone house is still considered by area historians to be an historic structure.

During the morning of September 11, 1777, British forces under Lord Charles Cornwallis' marched directly through the quiet crossroads. Cornwallis, using a flanking maneuver, surprise troops commanded by Washington, a move that enabled Cornwallis to avert a confrontation with Washington's main force at Chadds Ford.

When Cornwallis reached the crossroads, he encountered a small party of American troops commanded by Lieutenant Colonel James Ross of the 8th Pennsylvania Regiment. Ross, who headed one of the many picket lines deployed that day, fired three shots before retreating. He later followed the rearguard of the British army, skirmishing with them along the Great Valley Road before reporting his findings of a flanking maneuver to Washington.

=== 1800s ===
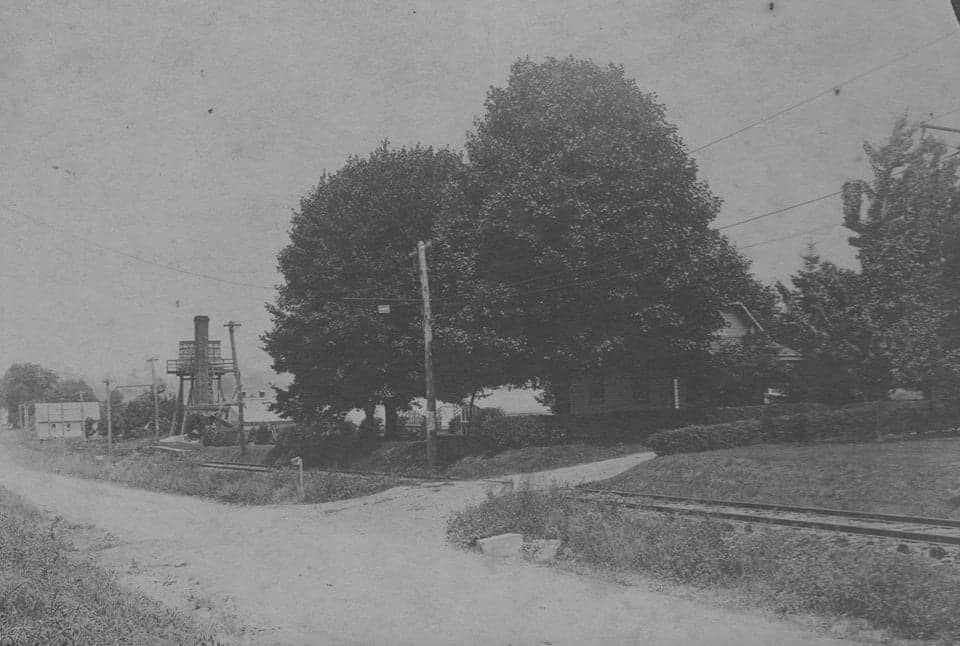
Rakestraw Pyle Nursery, Willowdale; a small stone chapel near the intersection at Street Road is in the background beyond the water tower

During the nineteenth century, the crossroads grew as the nearby Du Pont Factory increased its manufacture of black powder. The black powder, which was 15% charcoal, needed the process of burning trees to produce the power and the willow trees from Willowdale were among the best to burn.

As a result of the town's growth, a post office, general store, church, wheelwright shop, blacksmith, and church were erected during the late nineteenth century in and around the crossroads.

In 1866, Josiah Pyle and William Rakestraw, both landowners in the crossroads, formed the Rakestraw-Pyle Company, a plant nursery on the northeast of the crossroads near the present-day Willowdale Church. The property included a greenhouse, water tower, and gardens. The business is still owned and operated by the same family in the same location today. It is now known as R-P Nurseries.

=== 1900s ===
During the twentieth century, the community's growth continued. In 1906, a trolley line was built by the West Chester Street Rail company through the present-day crossroads and following the Unionville Road. The service, which originated in Kennett Square, stopped at the station at the general store near the crossroads at Willowdale, and ran ten minutes before and after each hour throughout the day.

A trolley switch between the chapel building and the station allowed two trolley cars to pass by each other, going in opposite directions to and from Kennett Square. The trolley ran through the area until 1929, when a bus route replaced the service. Today, one can still see the outline of the trolley line on the stone wall lining on the left side of the Unionville Road, driving southwards.

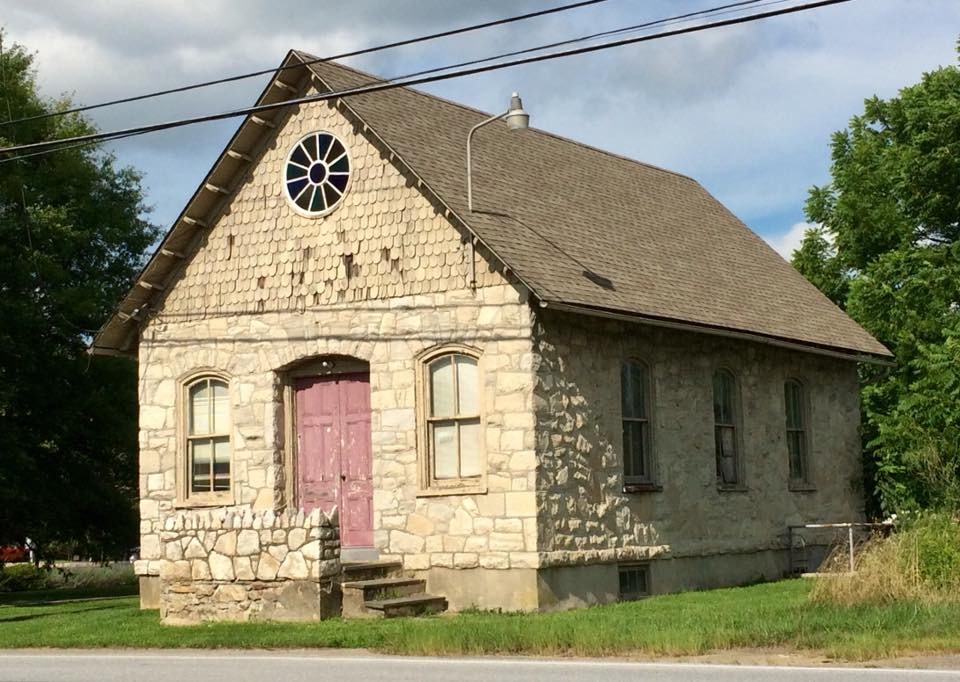
Willowdale Church

Around that same time, the church had outgrown its original building and a larger structure was built, directly across from the original church. The congregation still exists today, with services each Sunday.

During the latter part of the twentieth century, as Chester County was becoming increasingly suburbanized, growth of the crossroads area surged again. The area occupying the northeastern side of the crossroads was developed, and the original general store and various outbuildings were razed. The barn and stone house were also converted into an office space.

Today, this area is known for varying commercial services such as food, health, financing, and local state government offices. Still, the intersection retains much of its rural appearance, as it essentially acts as the boundary between suburban and rural Pennsylvania due to much of the land West of the crossroads being majority farmland. In contrast, land east of the crossroads is home the majority of housing developments.

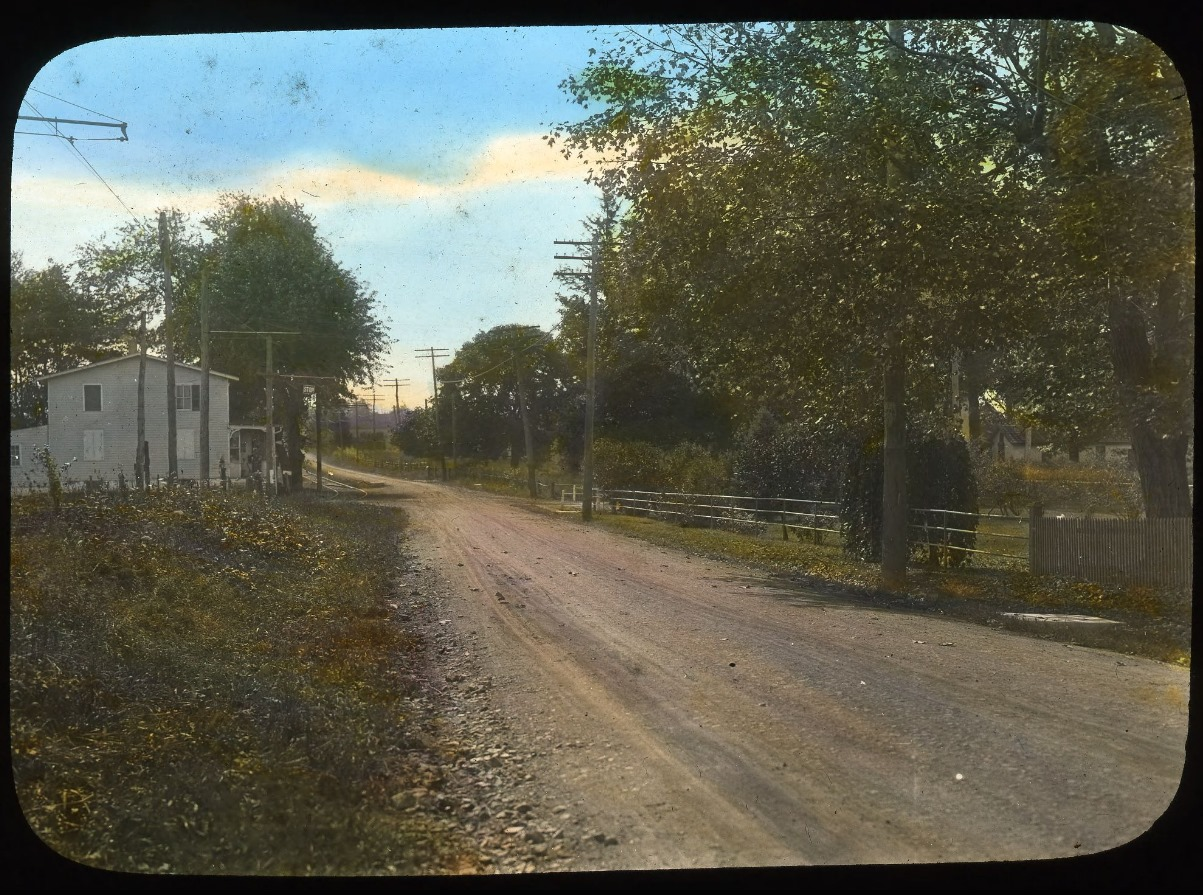
Pyle General Store and the trolly line operated by the West Chester Street Rail Company from 1904 until 1929

== Geography ==
Willowdale is located at 39° 52' 27" North, 75° 43' 5" West.

It is located at the crossroads of Pennsylvania Routes 926 and 82, between Kennett Square and Unionville. It is situated close to Longwood Gardens and is a twenty-minute drive from downtown Wilmington, Delaware.

== Education ==
Willowdale is located in the Unionville-Chadds Ford School District.

== Local attractions ==
Willowdale Steeplechase: The Willowdale Steeplechase Races are sanctioned by the National Steeplechase Association and attract some of the best racehorses and top jockeys from around the world. Set in a natural amphitheater, the course features traditional European hedges, post, and rail fences and a water jump.

Longwood Gardens (An international garden destination located approximately five minutes from Willowdale): 1,050 acres (4.2 km^{2}) of gardens, woodlands, and meadows; twenty outdoor gardens; twenty indoor gardens within four acres (16,000 m²) of heated greenhouses; 11,000 different types of plants; fountains.

Brandywine Battlefield (Located approximately fifteen minutes from Willowdale): A permanent interpretive exhibit and an audio-visual presentation at this museum's visitor center tell the story of the Battle of Brandywine and explain its connection to the Philadelphia Campaign of 1777. Changing exhibits cover other topics of interest. American Revolution.
