= Kennett High School (Pennsylvania) =

Coordinates: 39.8383°N 75.7082°W

Location
- 100 East South Street; Kennett Square, Pennsylvania 19348; United States

Information
- Type: High School
- Established: 1921
- School district: Kennett Consolidated School District
- Principal: Lorenzo DeAngelis
- Staff: 83.10 (FTE)
- Grades: 9-12
- Enrollment: 1,267 (2023–2024)
- Student to teacher ratio: 15.25
- Colors: Blue and white
- Athletics: Pennsylvania Interscholastic Athletic Association
- Mascot: Blue Demon
- Rival: Unionville High School
- Newspaper: The Demon Press
- Website: khs.kcsd.org

Kennett High School is the only public high school in the Kennett Consolidated School District and is located in Kennett Square, Pennsylvania, United States. The school averages around 1300 students and 100 faculty members. The Kennett Consolidated School District Office is located next to the high school.

== Campus ==
The school is located just south of Kennett Square, Pennsylvania. Recent major renovations were completed in 2006, including the construction of a new science wing. The high school's new stadium, renovations to the baseball and soccer fields, and the addition of a new concession stand were all completed in the summer of 2007. As part of the renovations, the previously adjacent Kennett Middle School was relocated to Landenberg, Pennsylvania, in a newly constructed building of its own.

== Extracurricular activities ==
Kennett offers the following sports programs: Golf, Cross Country (Boys and Girls), Soccer (Boys and Girls), Field Hockey, Volleyball, Tennis (Boys and Girls), Football, Ice Hockey, Wrestling, Basketball (Boys and Girls), Winter Track (Boys and Girls), Swimming (Boys and Girls), Cheerleading, Baseball, Softball, Lacrosse (Boys and Girls), and Track (Boys and Girls)

Both football and the marching band were brought back in the 2005–2006 school year after being absent from the district for many years. 2011-12 Kennett football program recorded their first non-losing season, as varsity finished with a 6–6 record.

During the 2001–2002 season, the KHS Basketball team was the Pennsylvania AAA State Basketball champion.

During the 2018–2019 and the 2023-2024 seasons, the KHS Boys Swim team were the Ches-Mont League American Division Champions.

Kennett's chapter of the Pennsylvania Future Business Leaders of America is the largest in the region, one of the ten largest in the state, and one of the 100 largest in the nation.

In 2015, the Kennett Marching Band won first place in the Cavalcade of Bands A Class Championships.

Music students at Kennett have also participated in the Pennsylvania Music Educators Association district, region, and state festivals for band, chorus, and orchestra.

== Notable alumni ==
- Bob Morse, professional basketball player
