= Gideon Wickersham Farmstead =

Historic house in Pennsylvania, United States

- U.S. National Register of Historic Places
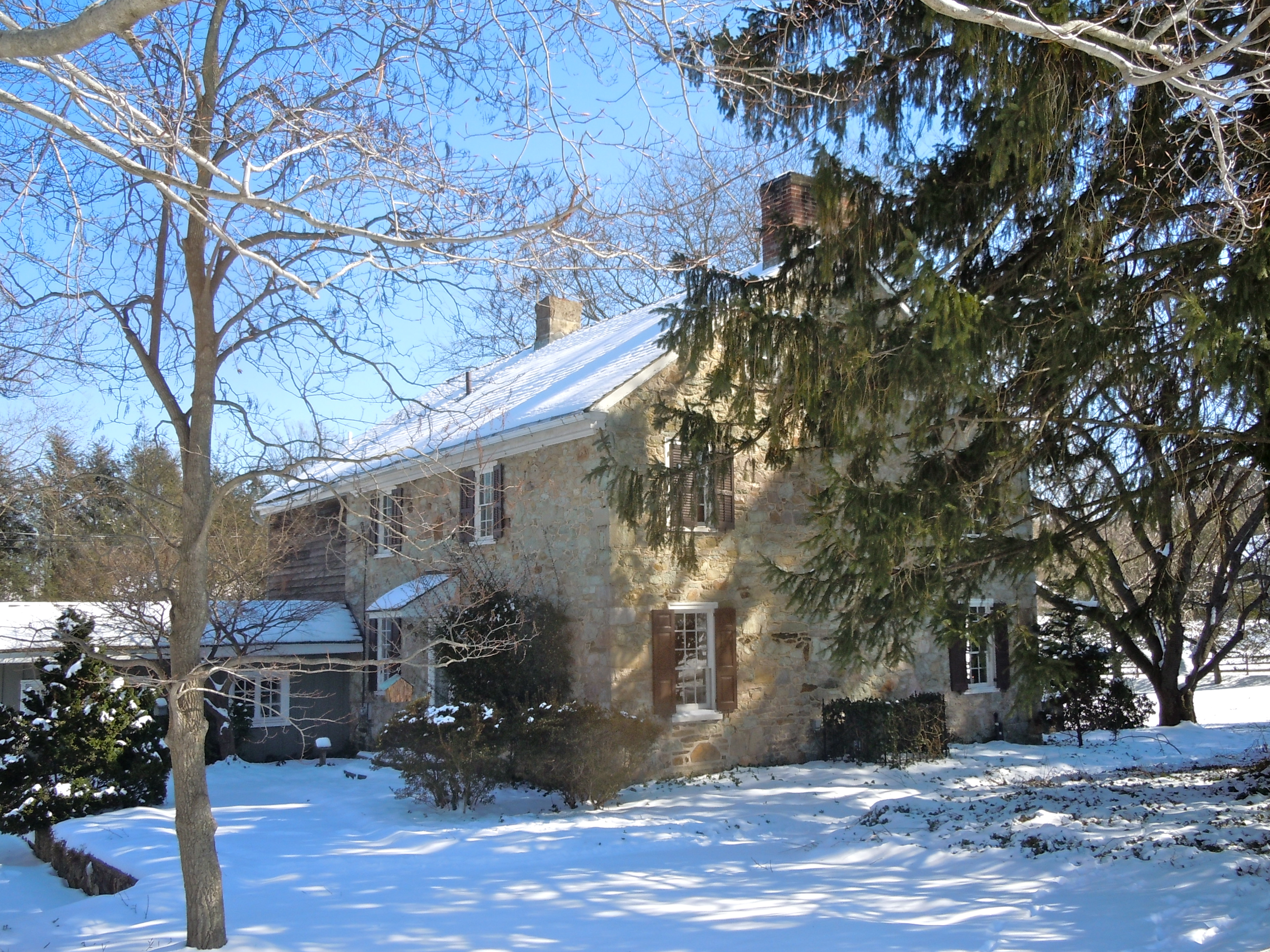
- Gideon Wickersham Farmstead, February 2011

- Location within Pennsylvania Location within the United States
- Location: 750 Northbrook Road, near Kennett Square, East Marlborough Township, Pennsylvania
- Coordinates: 39°53′19″N 75°41′23″W
- Area: 2 acres (0.81 ha)
- Built: 1818
- Built by: Wickersham, Gideon
- Architectural style: Colonial Revival, Other, Georgian
- NRHP reference No.: 87001992
- Added to NRHP: January 30, 1988

The Gideon Wickersham Farmstead, also known as "Hame's Best," is an historic home which is located near Kennett Square, East Marlborough Township, Chester County, Pennsylvania.

It was added to the National Register of Historic Places in 1988.

== History and architectural features ==
The farmhouse was built in 1818, and is a square stone dwelling in a vernacular Georgian style. The home measures 30 by 30 feet (9.1 by 9.1 m) and is constructed of schist and serpentine stone. To the east of the stone core is a nineteenth-century clapboard addition. The house has a two-story, frame addition with a flat roof. Also located on the property is a contributing barn.
