= East Marlborough Township, Pennsylvania =

Township in Pennsylvania, US

East Marlborough Township
- Township
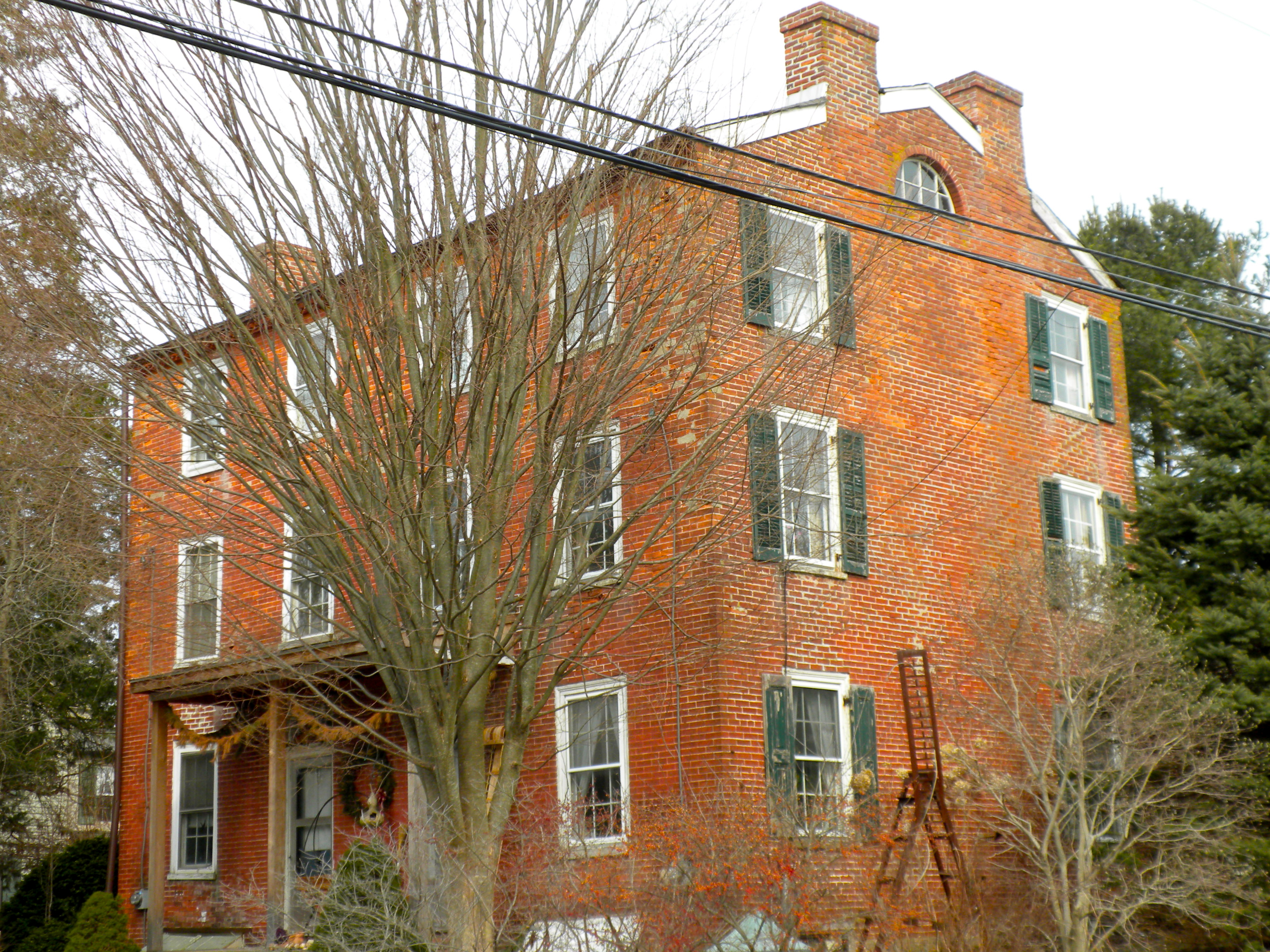
- Unionville Historic District

- Logo

- Location in Chester County and the state of Pennsylvania.

- Location of Pennsylvania in the United States
- Coordinates: 39°52′20″N 75°43′45″W
- Country: United States
- State: Pennsylvania
- County: Chester

Area
  - Total: 15.54 sq mi (40.26 km^{2})
  - Land: 15.45 sq mi (40.02 km^{2})
  - Water: 0.089 sq mi (0.23 km^{2})
- Elevation: 358 ft (109 m)

Population (2020)
  - Total: 7,305
  - Estimate (2023): 7,877
  - Density: 470.4/sq mi (181.64/km^{2})
- Time zone: UTC-5 (EST)
  - Summer (DST): UTC-4 (EDT)
- Area code: 610
- FIPS code: 42-029-21480
- Website: www.eastmarlborough.org

East Marlborough Township is a township in Chester County, Pennsylvania, United States. The population was 7,305 at the 2020 census. East Marlborough and West Marlborough townships were carved out of the larger Marlborough Township in 1729. The township is home to many Penn Oak trees, trees that were in existence when William Penn explored the area.

The well-known Longwood Gardens is located in East Marlborough Township.

== History ==
Cedarcroft, Green Valley Historic District, Longwood Gardens District, Marlborough Village Historic District, South Brook Farm, Unionville Village Historic District, and the Gideon Wickersham Farmstead are listed on the National Register of Historic Places.

== Geography ==
According to the United States Census Bureau, the township has a total area of 15.6 square miles (40 km^{2}), all land. It contains the census-designated place of Unionville.

Adjacent townships

- Newlin Township (north)
- Pocopson Township (northeast)
- Pennsbury Township (east)
- Kennett Township (south)
- New Garden Township (southwest)
- West Marlborough Township (west)

== Demographics ==
Historical population
Census	Pop.	Note	%±
1930	1,599		—
1940	1,600		0.1%
1950	1,868		16.8%
1960	2,417		29.4%
1970	3,031		25.4%
1980	3,953		30.4%
1990	4,781		20.9%
2000	6,317		32.1%
2010	7,026		11.2%
2020	7,305		4.0%
2023 (est.)	7,877		7.8%

At the 2010 census, the township was 89.2% non-Hispanic White, 1.4% Black or African American, 0.2% Native American, 3.6% Asian, 0.1% Native Hawaiian or other Pacific Islander, and 1.3% were two or more races. 4.6% of the population were of Hispanic or Latino ancestry.

As of the census of 2000, there were 6,317 people, 2,131 households, and 1,734 families residing in the township. The population density was 404.5 inhabitants per square mile (156.2/km^{2}). There were 2,188 housing units at an average density of 140.1 per square mile (54.1/km^{2}). The racial makeup of the township was 94.40% White, 1.20% African American, 0.09% Native American, 2.33% Asian, 0.06% Pacific Islander, 0.79% from other races, and 1.12% from two or more races. Hispanic or Latino of any race were 3.96% of the population.

There were 2,131 households, out of which 43.8% had children under the age of 18 living with them, 73.9% were married couples living together, 5.6% had a female householder with no husband present, and 18.6% were non-families. 15.0% of all households were made up of individuals, and 3.8% had someone living alone who was 65 years of age or older. The average household size was 2.92 and the average family size was 3.28.

In the township the population was spread out, with 30.9% under the age of 18, 5.5% from 18 to 24, 27.4% from 25 to 44, 28.7% from 45 to 64, and 7.6% who were 65 years of age or older. The median age was 38 years. For every 100 females, there were 100.5 males. For every 100 females age 18 and over, there were 97.6 males.

The median income for a household in the township was $95,812, and the median income for a family was $104,590. Males had a median income of $76,760 versus $42,260 for females. The per capita income for the township was $38,090. About 1.7% of families and 2.4% of the population were below the poverty line, including 3.7% of those under age 18 and 1.7% of those age 65 or over.

== Education ==
The majority of East Marlborough Township lies within the Unionville-Chadds Ford School District, with an exclave of the township lies within the Kennett Consolidated School District.

== Transportation ==
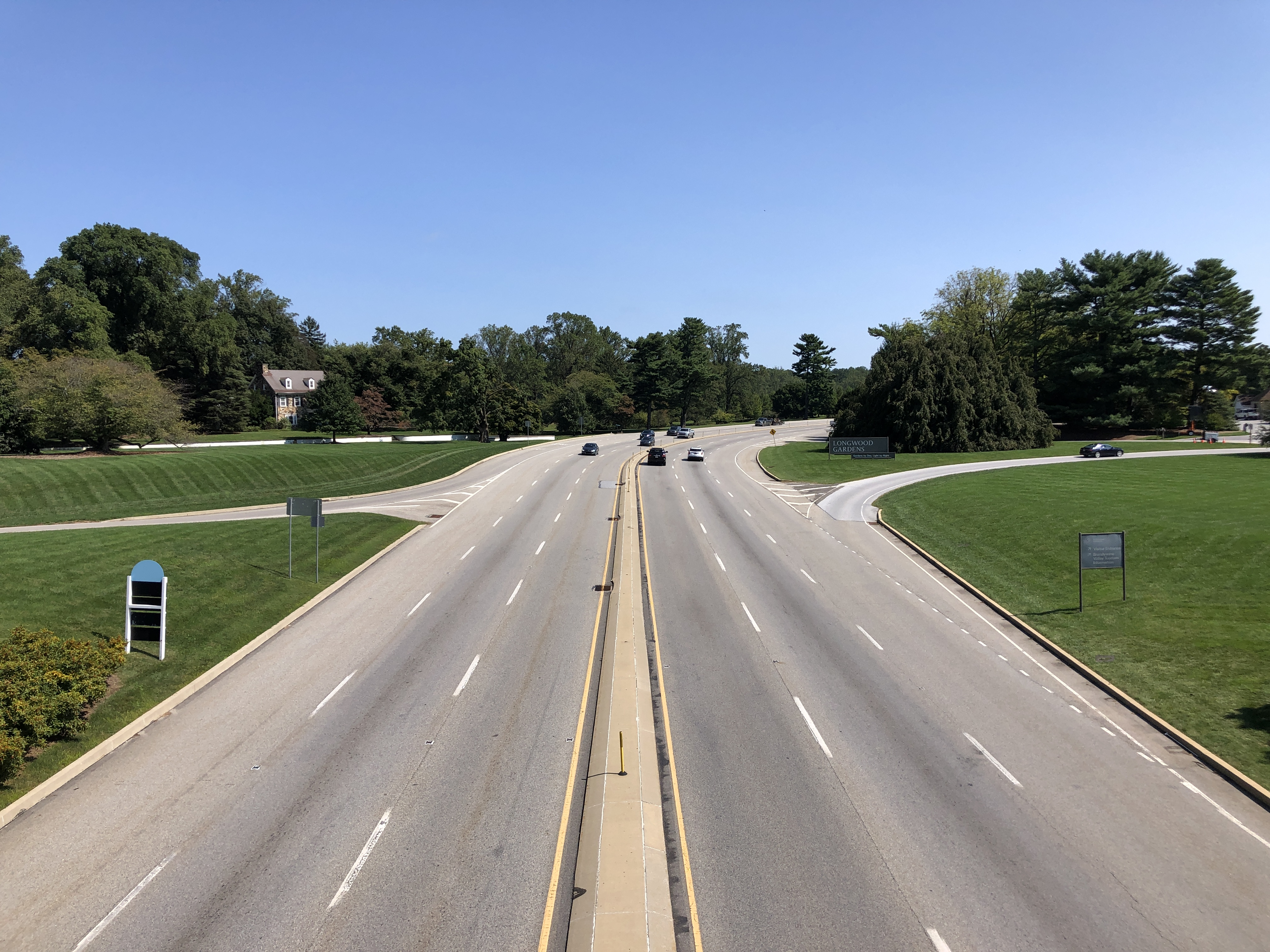
US 1 northbound along the edge of East Marlborough Township at the entrance to Longwood Gardens

As of 2018, there were 71.06 miles (114.36 km) of public roads in East Marlborough Township, of which 10.38 miles (16.70 km) were maintained by the Pennsylvania Department of Transportation (PennDOT) and 60.68 miles (97.65 km) were maintained by the township.

U.S. Route 1 is the most prominent highway serving East Marlborough Township. It follows the Kennett-Oxford Bypass and Baltimore Pike along the southern and southeastern edge of the township. Pennsylvania Route 52 follows Lenape Road along the far eastern edge of the township. Pennsylvania Route 82 follows Unionville Road and Doe Run Road along a northwest-southeast alignment through northwestern and central portions of the township. Pennsylvania Route 842 follows Clonmell Upland Road, Doe Run Road and Unionville Wawaset Road along a southwest-northeast alignment through northwestern portions of the township, with a short concurrency with PA 82. Finally, Pennsylvania Route 926 follows Street Road on a southwest-northeast alignment through the central portion of the township.
