= Episcopal Church of the Advent (Kennett Square, Pennsylvania) =

Church in Pennsylvania, United States

Coordinates: 39.851536°N 75.715134°W

Church of the Advent is an Episcopal church in Kennett Square in Chester County, in the US state of Pennsylvania. It received a charter for formation from the state on May 1, 1882.

The church reported 706 members in 2016 and 598 members in 2023; no membership statistics were reported in 2024 parochial reports. Plate and pledge income reported for the congregation in 2024 was $518,627. Average Sunday attendance (ASA) in 2024 was 148 persons.

The Church of the Advent began as a small church, compared to other congregations at the time. For the preceding dozen years its members had been meeting in various places in Kennett Square, including the Unicorn Tavern that stood on the northwest corner of State and Union Streets. The tavern, renowned in Bayard Taylor's The Story of Kennett Square, stood here for many years but burned down not long after Advent was founded. Meetings of Episcopalians also took place in the old Town Hall located on the south side of State Street, between Union and Broad.

== Founding of the Church ==
At the time of Advent's founding, there was limited transportation. This made it important to have a church within easy distance. Two near-by churches were established before Advent. One was St. James, near the intersection of Newark Road and Street Road in West Marlborough Township. The year it was founded isn't known but it was destroyed in a storm in 1877, five years before Advent's founding. [In 2014 the site was revisited; the foundation ruins remain, hidden among a thicket of vines and trees.] St. John's of Kelton was established in 1741 and closed in 1946. As of this date, its buildings are being used by another church faith. Following St. John's closing, for many years the historical marker on the site of the Original St. John's Church and Ancient Burial Ground, on State Road in New London Township, read, Information concerning new burials can be obtained through the Episcopal Church of the Advent, Kennett Square, PA. St. Luke's of Chadds Ford was established at the same time as Advent – in 1884. It closed in 1932 but the building still stands, now used by the Chadds Ford municipality. The small white structure is located in the old village of Chadds Ford, one block south of Route 1 and one block away from the Brandywine River Museum.

But many of the residents of Kennett Square felt they needed their own church. So, working with the Episcopal Diocese of Pennsylvania, parishioners put together a petition to get an official Charter. The names of the signers of this petition are on file. One was Theodore Hadley whose son, Charles Hadley, was to be the owner and publisher of the local newspaper. Later, Charles and his sister, Irene, established the Hadley Fund in memory of their parents, Theodore and Elizabeth. The Hadley Fund is an endowment. Charles and Irene created the fund to provide money for programs that better " the civic betterment, social welfare, and education" of our local communities. The Hadley Fund continues to be used today by Church of the Advent to provide and promote outreach activities for the surrounding communities.

The first job of the new church was to erect a church building. A committee of three members pledged themselves to gather the money necessary to build a church building for the newly chartered parish. These three were: Theodore D. Hadley, S. Ashton Hand, and Henry C. White. They were very successful with raising money and, in 1885, they placed the cornerstone for the new building. The Church site was on the west side of South Broad Street in the Borough of Kennett Square, just below Union. The new church was completed in 1886. This building served the Kennett Square Episcopalians for the next seventy years.

== Naming Church of the Advent ==
Philadelphia had a Church of the Advent at the time of Kennett Square's Church founding. A member of the new Kennett congregation lived in Philadelphia where he attended church at that 'original' Advent. Philadelphia's Church of the Advent's first Priest was Dr. Phillips Brooks. By the time Kennett Square erected their church, Dr. Brooks was the most famous preacher of his time, serving as rector to Trinity Church in Boston. Parishioners agreed that they should name the new Kennett Square Episcopal Church- Church of the Advent in honor of Phillips Brooks' first church assignment in Philadelphia.

== Church of the Advent's Stained Glass Windows ==
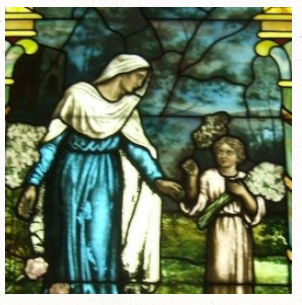
This is one of the stained glass windows created in honor of Bayard Taylor. It is now on display inside Church of the Advent Kennett Square.

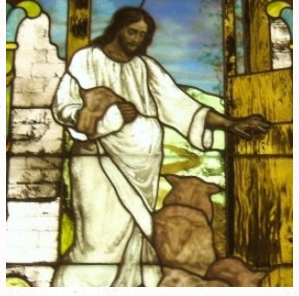
This is one of the stained glass windows created in honor of Bayard Taylor. It is now on display inside Church of the Advent Kennett Square.

Kennett Square's most famous citizen, Bayard Taylor (author, poet, traveler, and diplomat), had just died in 1878. Those who knew him sought a suitable memorial. Since the church was just being constructed, it was a perfect site to honor Bayard Taylor by installing stained glass windows in his memory. His friends collected the donations that came from many persons, including the American poets James Russell Lowell and John Greenleaf Whittier, the author Samuel [Mark Twain] Clemens, the later Supreme Court Justice Oliver Wendell Holmes, and the Episcopal Bishop, Dr. Phillips Brooks, at that time Rector of Trinity Church. The Bayard Taylor windows depict the Good Samaritan parable.

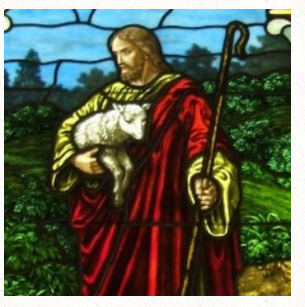
This is one of the stained glass windows created in honor of Bayard Taylor. It is now on display inside Church of the Advent Kennett Square.
