= Unionville Village Historic District =

Historic district in Pennsylvania, United States

- U.S. National Register of Historic Places
- U.S. Historic district
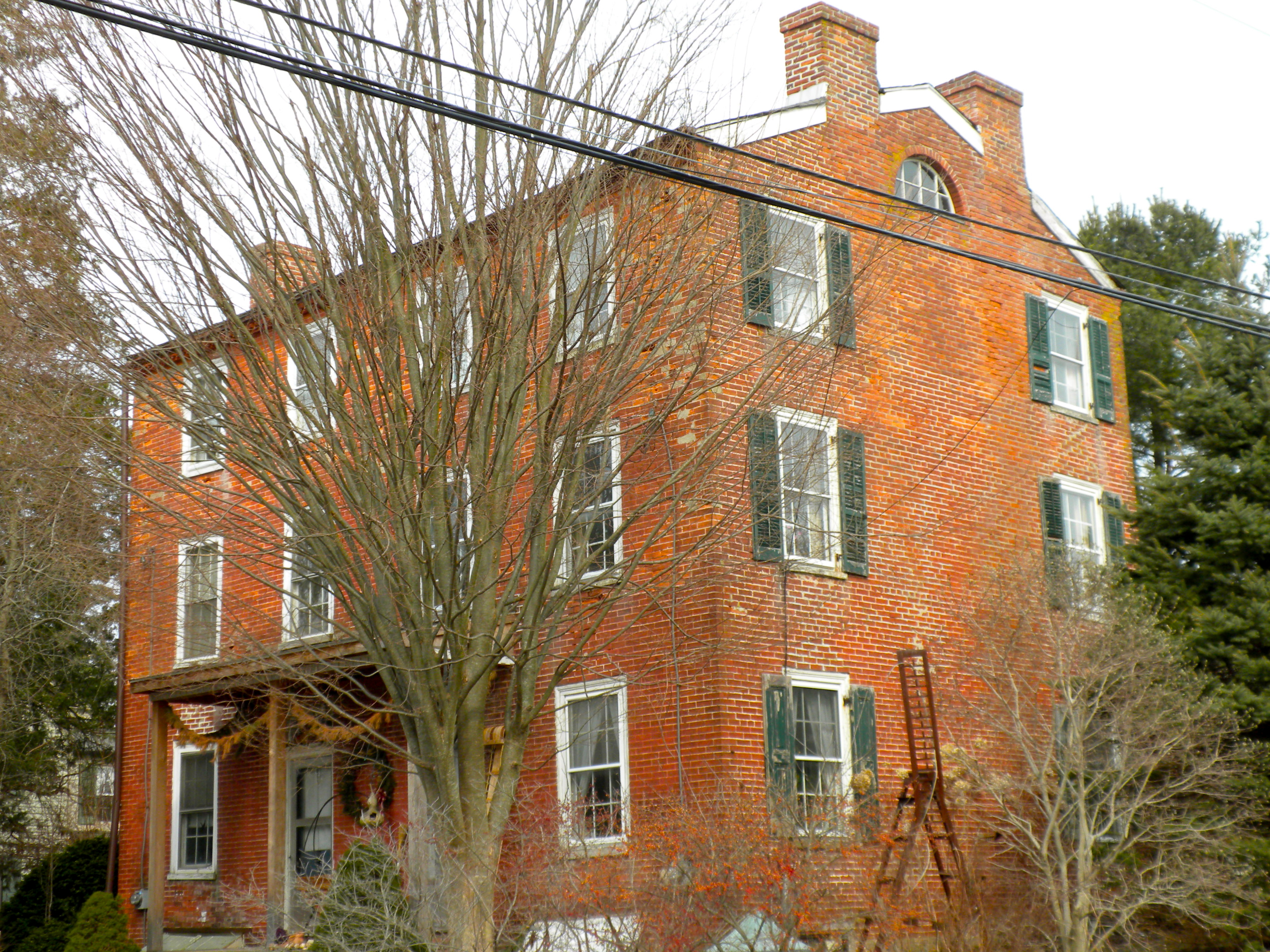
- House in the Unionville Village Historic District, March 2010

- Location within Pennsylvania Location within the United States
- Location: PA 162 and PA 82, Unionville, East Marlborough Township, Pennsylvania
- Coordinates: 39°53′42″N 75°44′09″W
- Area: 120 acres (49 ha)
- Built: 1751
- NRHP reference No.: 79002205
- Added to NRHP: June 6, 1979

The Unionville Village Historic District is a national historic district that is located in Unionville in East Marlborough Township, Chester County, Pennsylvania.

It was added to the National Register of Historic Places in 1979.

== History and architectural features ==
This district encompasses sixty-nine contributing buildings that are located in the village of Unionville and includes a variety of brick, stone, and frame residences, the earliest of which is dated to about 1750. Notable buildings include the Unionville Academy (1834), a country store (c. 1875), the Union Hotel (1834), the Cross Keys Inn (1751), the Unionville Saddle Shop (1887), the Unionville Hall (1849–50), the Grange Hall (1845; originally the Friends Meetinghouse), and the Green Lawn Seminary.

== Gallery ==
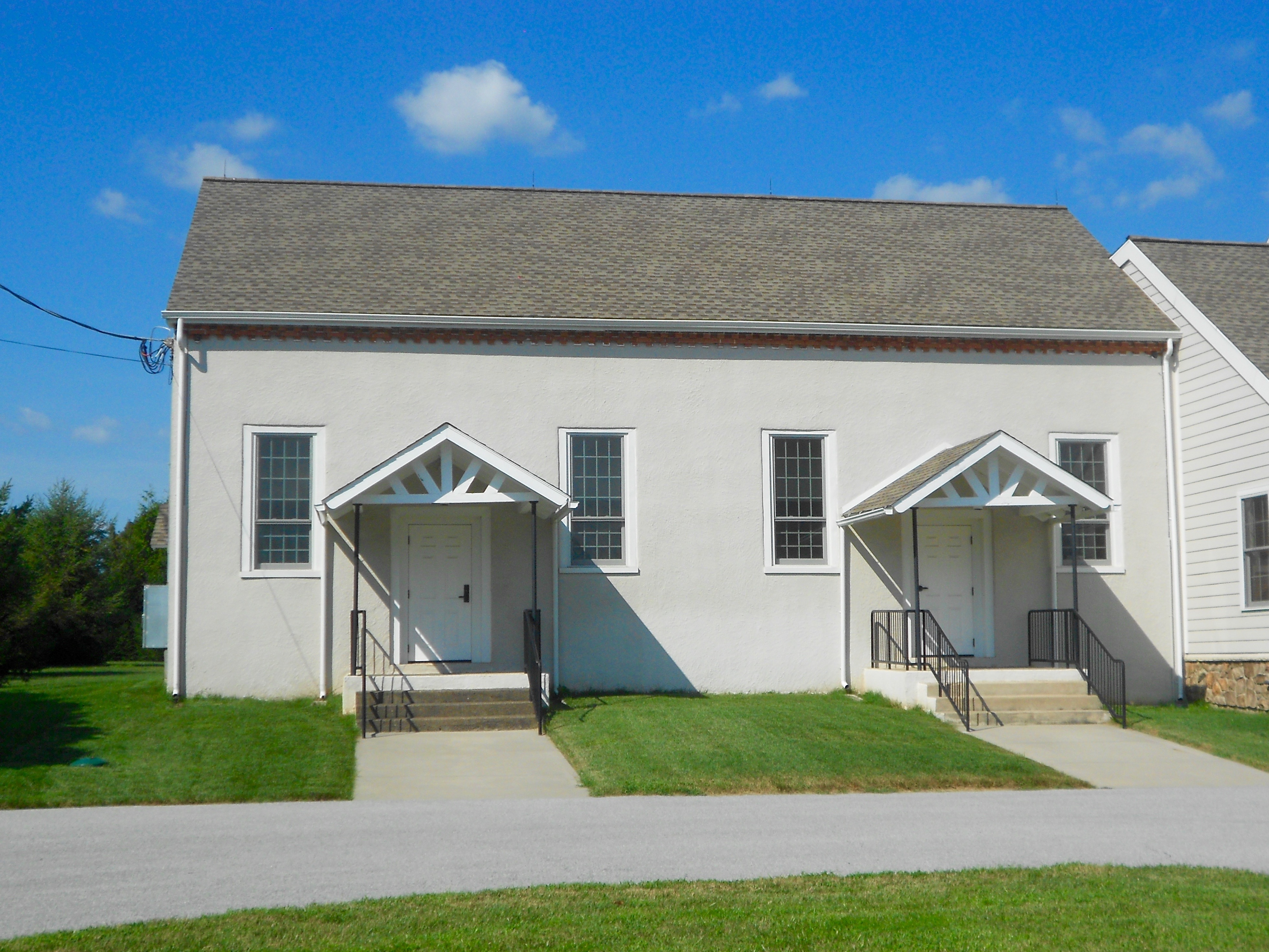
Friends meeting house, once used as a Grange building, is now used as a Sunday school by the Grace Fellowship Church

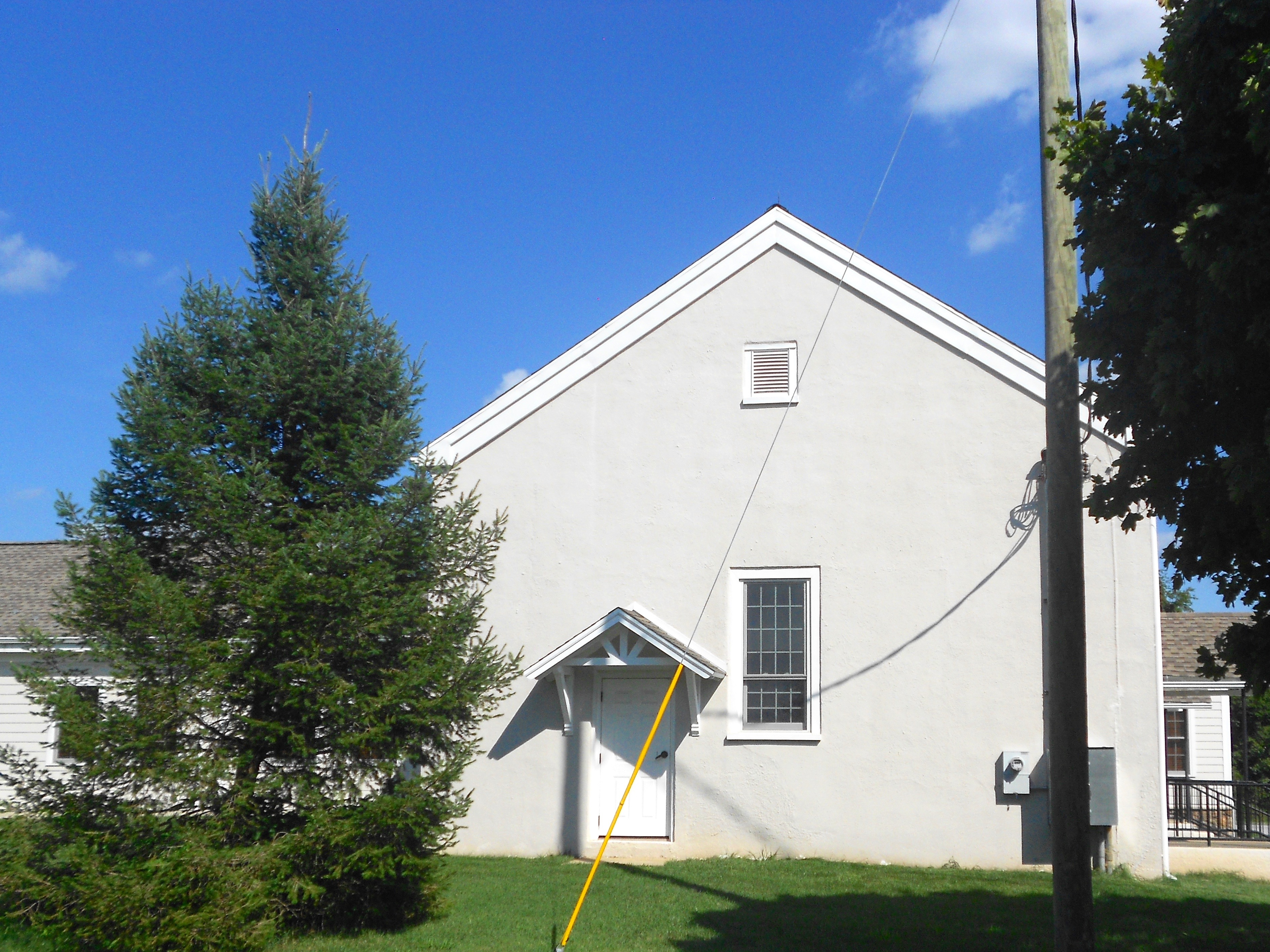
Side of the meeting house
