= William Marshall Swayne =

American sculptor (1828–1918)

William Marshall Swayne (December 1, 1828 – May 1, 1918) was an American sculptor and writer who lived in Chester County, Pennsylvania.

== Biography ==
William Marshall Swayne, commonly known as Marshall Swayne, was born on December 1, 1828, in Pennsbury Township, Pennsylvania. He married Mary S. Barnard in 1850 and had eight children. At the suggestion of Supreme Court justice Noah Haynes Swayne, he was appointed to the United States Treasury Department by President Abraham Lincoln. Swayne had a farm in East Marlborough Township, Pennsylvania, and later lived in Kennett Square. He died on May 1, 1918.

== Artistic career ==
Swayne was a self-taught artist who sculpted many figures from history and from life, including General Anthony Wayne, Salmon P. Chase, Edwin M. Stanton, William H. Seward, Andrew Johnson, Bayard Taylor, General George Meade, Sam Houston, and John Hickman.

=== Bust of Lincoln ===
Swayne did several sculptures of Lincoln, including a bust of the president while he posed for him and recited poetry to visitors. Lincoln said of the sculpture, "I have sat for several to model my likeness, but I like yours best."

The Division of Government, Politics, and Reform at the National Museum of American History (NMAH) houses a copy of Swayne's bust of Abraham Lincoln. It was donated to the Smithsonian Institution in 1940 by Swayne's heirs. It is bronzed plaster and is 30" high by 19" wide. It is marked, "W.M. Swayne, Scpr. June 8, 1864."

The sculpture was last on view in 1999 when it was lent to the Lincoln Museum in Fort Wayne, Indiana, for an exhibition titled "Lincoln from Life." Swayne also made several smaller copies of this bust that were given to family, friends, and presidents. It is reported that 10 were made. President Fillmore was one among the ten that received a copy of Swayne's famous bust.
