= Talula's Table =

Coordinates: 39.846668°N 75.711808°W

Talula's Table is a small gourmet market and restaurant in Kennett Square, Pennsylvania. During the day, Talula's Table is a gourmet coffee shop and market. At night, Talulas's Table turns into a restaurant containing only two tables. It is known as the hardest reservation to get in the US. With only two tables: one that seats from 8 to 12 people and a "nook table" that seats from 4 to 8 people, reservations are taken every day for one year from that date.

Saveur magazine named Talula's number 52 on their 2010 Top 100 Restaurants listing.
