= Unionville, Chester County, Pennsylvania =

Unincorporated community in Pennsylvania, US

Unionville, Pennsylvania
- Unincorporated community Census designated place
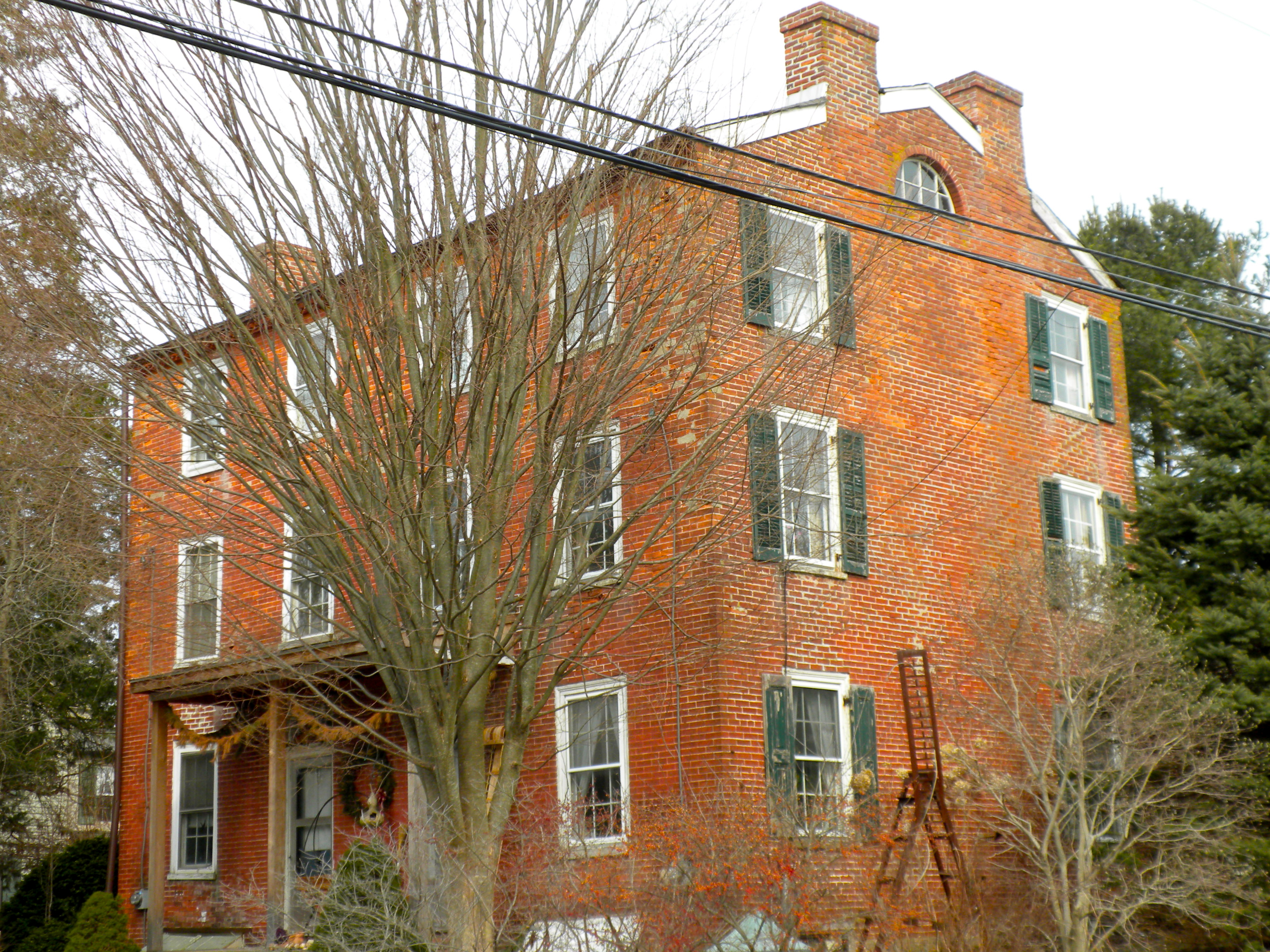
- House in the historic district

- Location in Chester County and the U.S. state of Pennsylvania

- Location of Unionville in Pennsylvania Unionville (the United States)
- Coordinates: 39°53′51.9″N 75°43′49.5″W
- Country: United States
- State: Pennsylvania
- County: Chester
- Township: East Marlborough

Area
  - Total: 0.863 sq mi (2.24 km^{2})
  - Land: 0.855 sq mi (2.21 km^{2})
  - Water: 0.008 sq mi (0.021 km^{2})
- Elevation: 476 ft (145 m)

Population (2020)
  - Total: 577
  - Density: 675/sq mi (261/km^{2})
- Time zone: UTC-5 (EST)
  - Summer (DST): UTC-4 (EDT)
- ZIP code: 19375
- Area codes: 610 and 484
- FIPS code: 4278624
- GNIS feature ID: 2812903

Unionville is an unincorporated community and census-designated place in East Marlborough Township in southern Chester County, Pennsylvania, United States. It was originally known as Jacksonville. The Unionville Village Historic District was added to the National Register of Historic Places in 1979. As of 2020, the CDP has a population of 577.

== Education ==
Unionville is located in the Unionville-Chadds Ford School District.

== Sports ==
Unionville High School is a member of the Ches-mont league since 2007, in PIAA District 1.

== Demographics ==
Historical population
| Census | Pop. | Note | %± |
|---|---|---|---|
| 2020 | 577 | | — |
U.S. Decennial Census

== Notable people ==
- John H. Pugh (1827–1905), represented New Jersey's 2nd congressional district in the United States House of Representatives, 1877-1879
- I. Milton Smith, poet in the latter half of the nineteenth century; born in Unionville
