= Green Valley Historic District =

Historic district in Pennsylvania, United States

- U.S. National Register of Historic Places
- U.S. Historic district
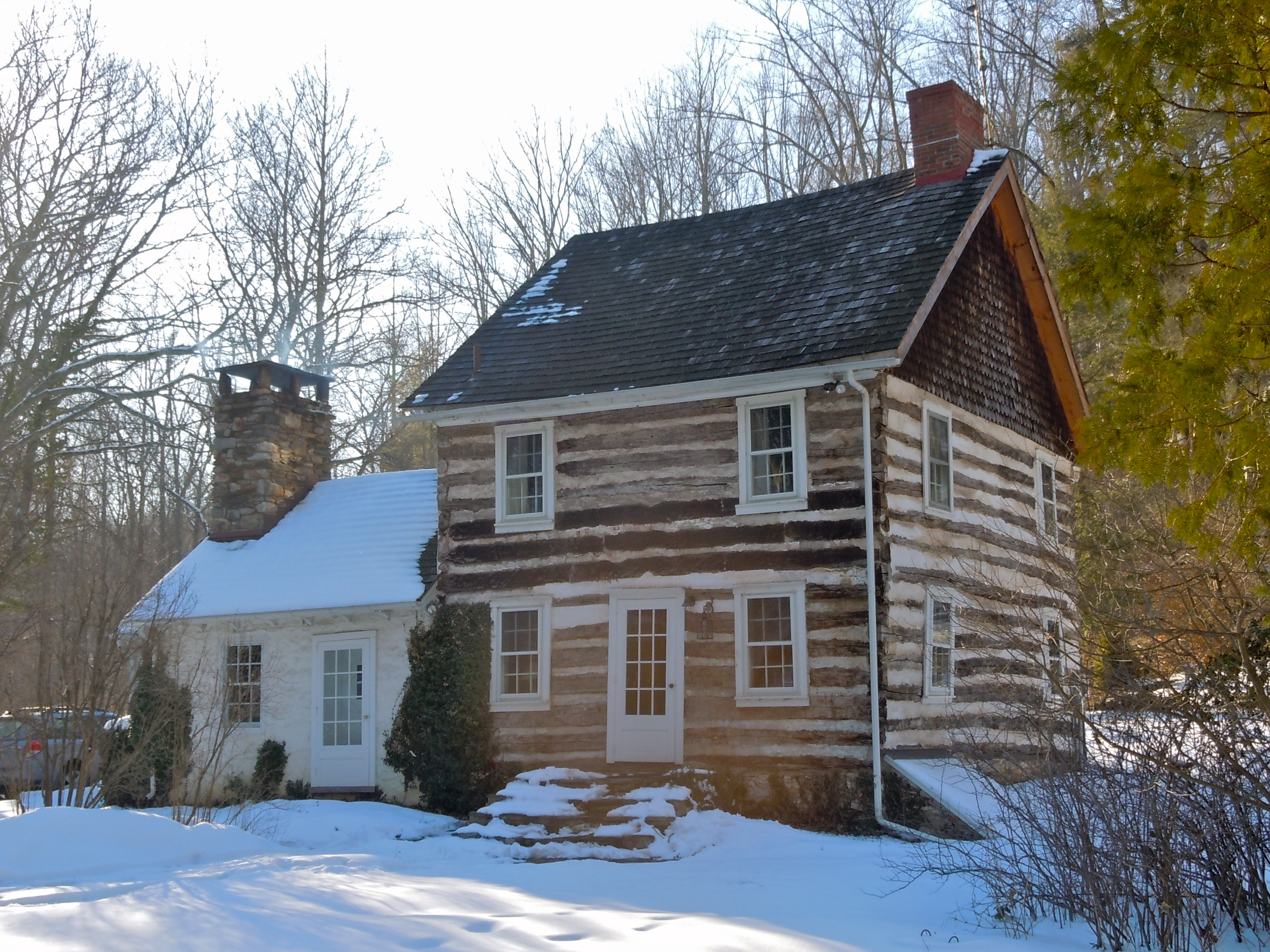
- Green Valley Log Cabin, Green Valley Historic District, February 2011

- Location within Pennsylvania Location within the United States
- Location: Green Valley Rd., East Marlborough Township and Newlin Township, Pennsylvania
- Coordinates: 39°55′18″N 75°45′40″W
- Area: 780 acres (320 ha)
- Architectural style: Georgian, Federal
- MPS: West Branch Brandywine Creek MRA
- NRHP reference No.: 85002352
- Added to NRHP: September 16, 1985

The Green Valley Historic District is a national historic district which is located in East Marlborough Township and Newlin Township, Chester County, Pennsylvania.

It was added to the National Register of Historic Places in 1985.

== History and architectural features ==
The Green Valley Historic District encompasses fourteen contributing buildings, one contributing site and two contributing structures. Located in rural Chester County, it includes a variety of vernacular stone and log farmhouses, farm outbuildings, mill sites, and lime kilns.

Notable properties include the Green Valley Farm, which was built sometime around 1810, the Green Valley School, which was erected in 1862, the William Hall log house, which was built sometime around 1795, Harvey's Mill house and mill site, which were built sometime around 1780, and the Robinson homestead, which was built sometime around 1820.
