= Kennett Consolidated School District =

School district in Pennsylvania

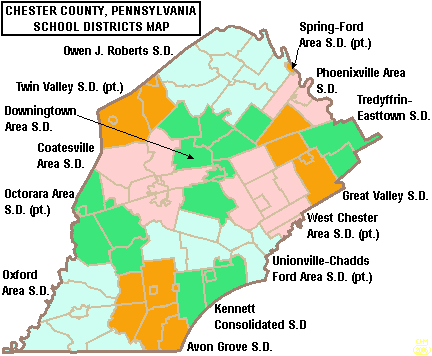

Address
- 300 East South Street Kennett Square, Chester County, Pennsylvania, 19348; United States

District information
- Type: Public

Other information
- Website: www.kcsd.org

The Kennett Consolidated School District (abbreviated as KCSD) is a large, suburban, public school district serving about 4,000 students from portions of Chester County, Pennsylvania. It is centered on the borough of Kennett Square and also incorporates Kennett Township, New Garden Township, and the southern portion of East Marlborough Twp. The district encompasses approximately 35 square miles (91 km^{2}). According to 2000 federal census data, it serves a resident population of 27,124.

The district operates five schools: Greenwood Elementary, Bancroft Elementary, Mary D. Lang Kindergarten Center, New Garden Elementary, Kennett Middle School, and Kennett High School.

== Extracurriculars ==
The district offers a variety of clubs, activities and sports to pupils in the high school and middle school.

=== Sports ===
Boys

- Baseball
- Basketball
- Cross Country
- Football
- Golf
- Indoor Track and Field
- Lacrosse
- Soccer
- Swimming and Diving
- Tennis
- Track and Field
- Wrestling

Girls

- Basketball
- Cross Country
- Field Hockey
- Indoor Track and Field
- Lacrosse
- Soccer (Fall)
- Softball
- Swimming and Diving
- Tennis
- Track and Field
- Volleyball

Middle School Sports

Boys

- Baseball
- Basketball
- Cross Country
- Football
- Lacrosse
- Soccer
- Track and Field
- Wrestling

Girls

- Basketball
- Cross Country
- Field Hockey
- Lacrosse
- Softball
- Soccer
- Track and Field

Volleyball
