= Unionville High School (Kennett Square, Pennsylvania) =

American school

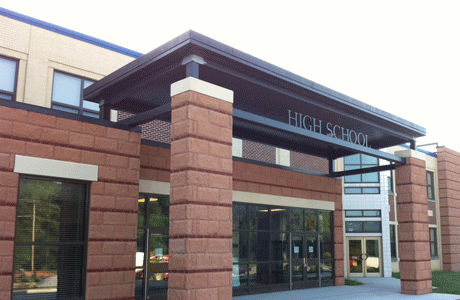
- Unionville High School in September 2011
- Kennett Square, Chester County, Pennsylvania 19348; United States

Information
- Type: Public High School
- School district: Unionville-Chadds Ford School District
- Staff: 98.70 (FTE)
- Grades: 9-12
- Enrollment: 1,270 (2023–2024)
- Student to teacher ratio: 12.87
- Team name: Longhorns
- Website: uhs.ucfsd.org

A four-year, high school located in Kennett Square, Pennsylvania, Unionville High School enrolls approximately 1,300 students. Unionville High School has received state recognition for excellence and high achievement in the preparation of students for higher education.

Each year, more than 95% of the Unionville High School graduating class takes the SAT examinations. Over 95% of all graduating seniors pursue some form of higher education; 89% go to 4-year colleges, while 7% go to 2-year colleges.

== Academics ==
=== Curriculum ===
Unionville has a 1:14 teacher-to-student ratio, allowing it to offer a wide range of both core and elective classes for its students. Its core departments- English, Social Studies, Math, and Science- are based on a four-tier system in order to allow for the variety of student capabilities, from First Level and Academic classes to Honors and Advanced Placement; in an attempt to broaden its curriculum, the school recently began to offer differentiated classes within those tiers, such as a choice between an American Literature Survey and Contemporary Young Adult Fiction for 11th grade Academic English students. Every graduating student must take four years each of English and Social Studies and three years each of Math and Science, among other requirements.

=== Achievements ===
Unionville High School has received state recognition for excellence and high achievement in preparing students for higher education; it consistently ranks as one of the top public high schools in the state of Pennsylvania, according to Pennsylvania's high school's standardized tests, the PSSAs, and in 2008 the Unionville-Chadds Ford School District had the highest PSSA scores in the State of Pennsylvania.

=== College readiness ===
Unionville employs a six-member full-time counseling staff, much of whose time is spent on the college application process, including meeting with every junior and senior at least once per year to determine their post-secondary educational needs and how the office can best facilitate them; 94% of graduating seniors in 2008 are currently attending college, 96% of which are four-year institutions. Unionville's SAT results are significantly higher than the national average, with a combined average of 1716 on the 2400 scale in 2008; there were 4 National Merit Semifinalists in 2010.

== Activities and award ==
Unionville High School has a total of 72 registered clubs, representing approximately one club for every 20 students and including five intra-school academic competition teams, such as Debate Team and Future Business Leaders of America, four honor societies, and several national and international organizations, such as Amnesty International and Habitat for Humanity, and the Bocce Club and the Unionville Signers, which promote sign language education.)

UHS Speech and Debate team is ranked in the top 3% (top 20) of roughly 3,600 high schools; #1 for the Philadelphia / Valley Forge area; #3 in the State of Pennsylvania, District 15 Champion for 2017–2018. State Champions in 2 of 8 categories and runners up in another 2 with one 3rd-place finish and 5 semifinalists.

== Notable alumni ==
- Justin Best, American Olympic Gold Medalist Rower
- Kyle Evans Gay, American politician and attorney (born 1986)
- Zeeko Zaki, Egyptian-American actor (born 1990)
