= Kennett Square, Pennsylvania =

Borough in Pennsylvania, US

- Borough
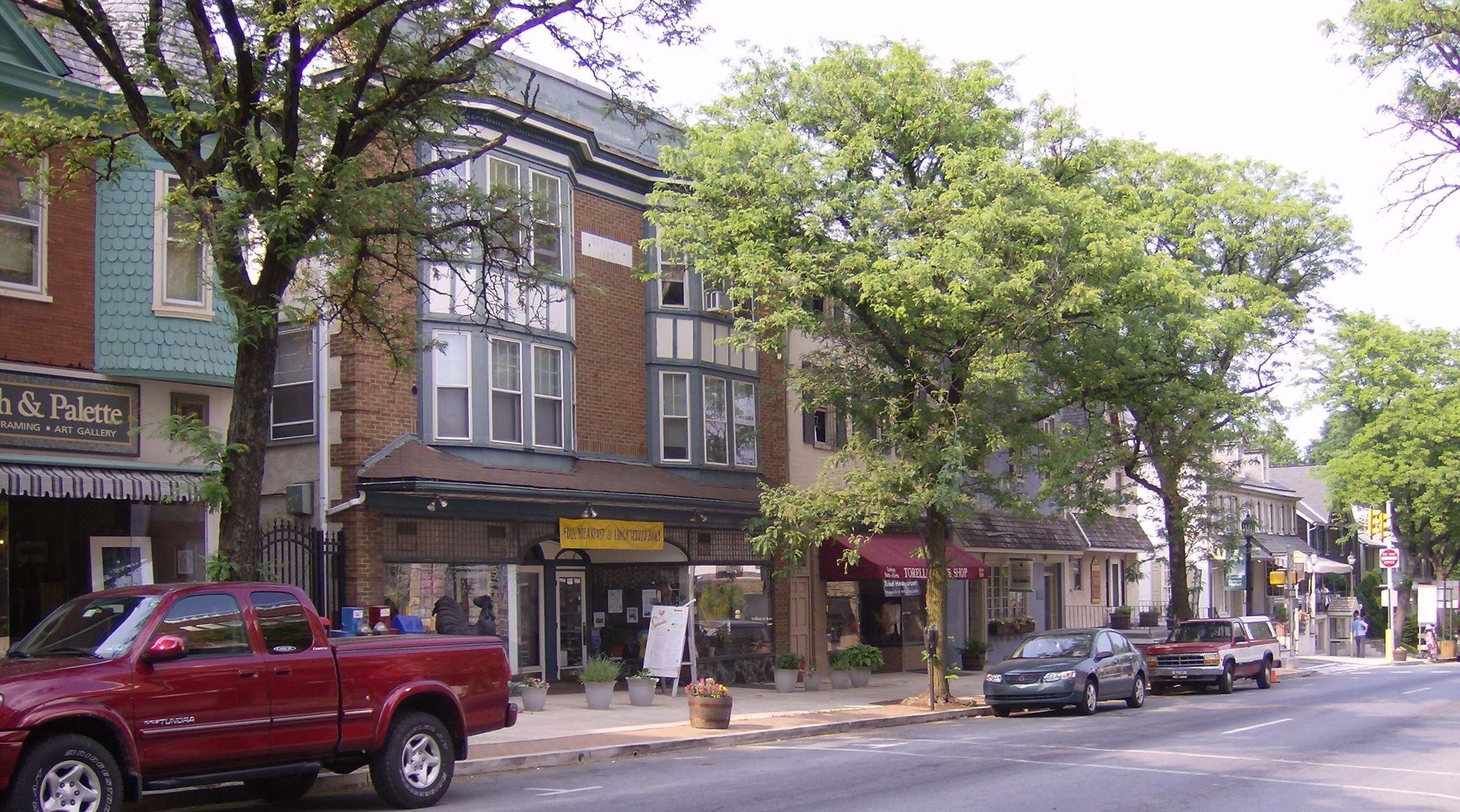
- State Street in Kennett Square, Pennsylvania, May 2007
- Nickname: "Kennett"
- Location in Chester County and the U.S. state of Pennsylvania

- Location in Pennsylvania Location in the United States
- Coordinates: 39°50′39″N 75°42′38″W
- Country: United States
- State: Pennsylvania
- County: Chester
- Settled: 1682

Government
  - Mayor: Matthew Fetick (Democratic)

Area
  - Total: 1.07 sq mi (2.78 km^{2})
  - Land: 1.07 sq mi (2.76 km^{2})
  - Water: 0.0077 sq mi (0.02 km^{2})
- Elevation: 328 ft (100 m)

Population (2020)
  - Total: 5,936
  - Density: 5,572.0/sq mi (2,151.38/km^{2})
- Time zone: UTC−5 (EST)
  - Summer (DST): UTC−4 (EDT)
- ZIP Code: 19348
- Area codes: 610 and 484
- FIPS code: 42-39352
- Website: www.kennettsq.org

Kennett Square is a borough in Chester County, Pennsylvania, United States. As of the 2020 U.S. census, Kennett Square had a population of 5,943.

Kennett Square is located in the Philadelphia metropolitan area, and is considered a suburb of both Philadelphia, the nation's sixth largest city as of 2020, and Wilmington, Delaware. The local high school is Kennett High School. The former corporate headquarters of Genesis HealthCare, which administers elderly care facilities, is based in Kennett Square inside the Walker Building and Franklin Center.

The borough is sometimes referred to as the "Mushroom Capital of the World" because mushroom farming in the region produces over 500 million pounds of mushrooms a year, representing half of the nation's mushroom crop production. To celebrate this heritage, Kennett Square holds an annual Mushroom Festival, where the town and its businesses hold a parade, gives mushroom farm tours, and sells food and other goods. Kennett Square is 3 miles away from Longwood Gardens.

== History ==
The area that became known as Kennett Square was originally inhabited by the Lenape Native American tribe. Once colonized, the town was named Kennett Square, a reference to Kennett, Wiltshire, England, with "Square" referring to the original land grant from William Penn, which was one square mile. In 1777, during the American Revolutionary War, Sir William Howe, a British Army general, led troops through Kennett Square on their way to the Battle of Brandywine.

In the 19th century, the borough played an instrumental role in the Underground Railroad, which helped slaves escape the South for freedom. In 1853, a group asked for Kennett Square to be incorporated, and by 1855, it held elections.

Kennett Square's founder is credited with introducing mushroom growing to the area. He grew carnations, a popular local commodity beginning in 1885, and wanted to make use of the wasted space under the elevated beds. He imported spawn from Europe and started experimenting with mushroom cultivation.

=== In culture ===
Kennett Square is the subject and setting of The Story of Kennett, an 1866 novel by Bayard Taylor, who was born in Kennett Square.

== Geography ==
Kennett Square is located at 39°50′39″N 75°42′38″W (39.844104, −75.710654).

According to the U.S. Census Bureau, the borough has a total area of 1.1 square miles (2.8 km^{2}), all land.

== Demographics ==
Historical population
Census	Pop.	Note	%±
1860	606		—
1870	884		45.9%
1880	1,021		15.5%
1890	1,326		29.9%
1900	1,516		14.3%
1910	2,049		35.2%
1920	2,308		12.6%
1930	3,091		33.9%
1940	3,375		9.2%
1950	3,699		9.6%
1960	4,355		17.7%
1970	4,876		12.0%
1980	4,715		−3.3%
1990	5,218		10.7%
2000	5,273		1.1%
2010	6,072		15.2%
2020	5,936		−2.2%
2021 (est.)	5,925	▼	−0.2%

As of the 2010 census, the borough was 42.8% non-Hispanic White, 7.2% Black or African American, 0.4% Native American, 0.8% Asian, and 3.3% were two or more races. 48.8% of the population were of Hispanic or Latino ancestry.

As of the census, there were 6,072 people, 1,868 households, and 1,242 families residing in the borough. The population density was 4,679.2 inhabitants per square mile (1,806.6/km^{2}). There were 1,967 housing units at an average density of 1,745.5 per square mile (673.9/km^{2}). The racial makeup of the borough was 73.58% White, 10.26% African American, 0.09% Native American, 1.63% Asian, 12.48% from other races, and 1.95% from two or more races. Hispanic or Latino people of any race were 27.88% of the population.

There were 1,868 households, out of which 30.2% had children under the age of 18 living with them, 48.2% were married couples living together, 11.8% had a female householder with no husband present, and 33.5% were non-families. Of all households, 28.2% were made up of individuals, and 11.9% had someone living alone who was 65 years of age or older. The average household size was 2.77, and the average family size was 3.39.

In the borough, the population was spread out, with 24.8% under the age of 18, 10.2% from 18 to 24, 31.0% from 25 to 44, 20.1% from 45 to 64, and 13.8% who were 65 years of age or older. The median age was 35 years. For every 100 females, there were 98.6 males. For every 100 females age 18 and over, there were 96.8 males.

The median income for a household in the borough was $46,523, and the median income for a family was $54,948. Males had a median income of $35,978 versus $27,246 for females. The per capita income for the borough was $22,292. About 7.5% of families and 9.0% of the population were below the poverty line, including 11.9% of those under age 18 and 10.4% of those age 65 or over.

== Transportation ==
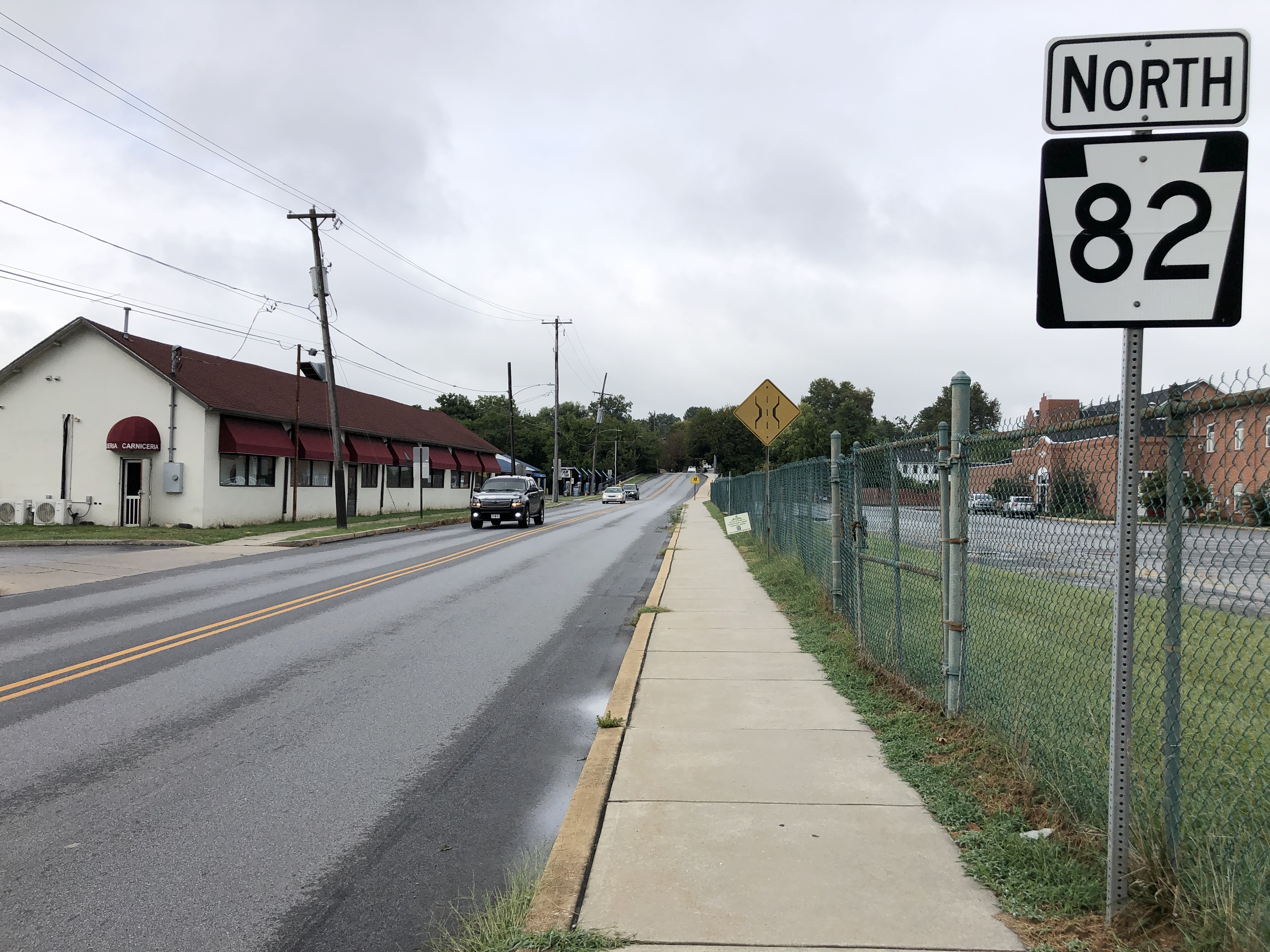
PA 82 northbound in Kennett Square

As of 2010, there were 18.83 miles (30.30 km) of public roads in Kennett Square, of which 1.33 miles (2.14 km) were maintained by Pennsylvania Department of Transportation (PennDOT) and 17.50 miles (28.16 km) were maintained by the borough.

Pennsylvania Route 82 is the only numbered highway directly serving the borough. It follows a southeast-to-northwest alignment through the central portion of the borough via South Street and Union Street. U.S. Route 1 bypasses the borough to the north.

== Government ==
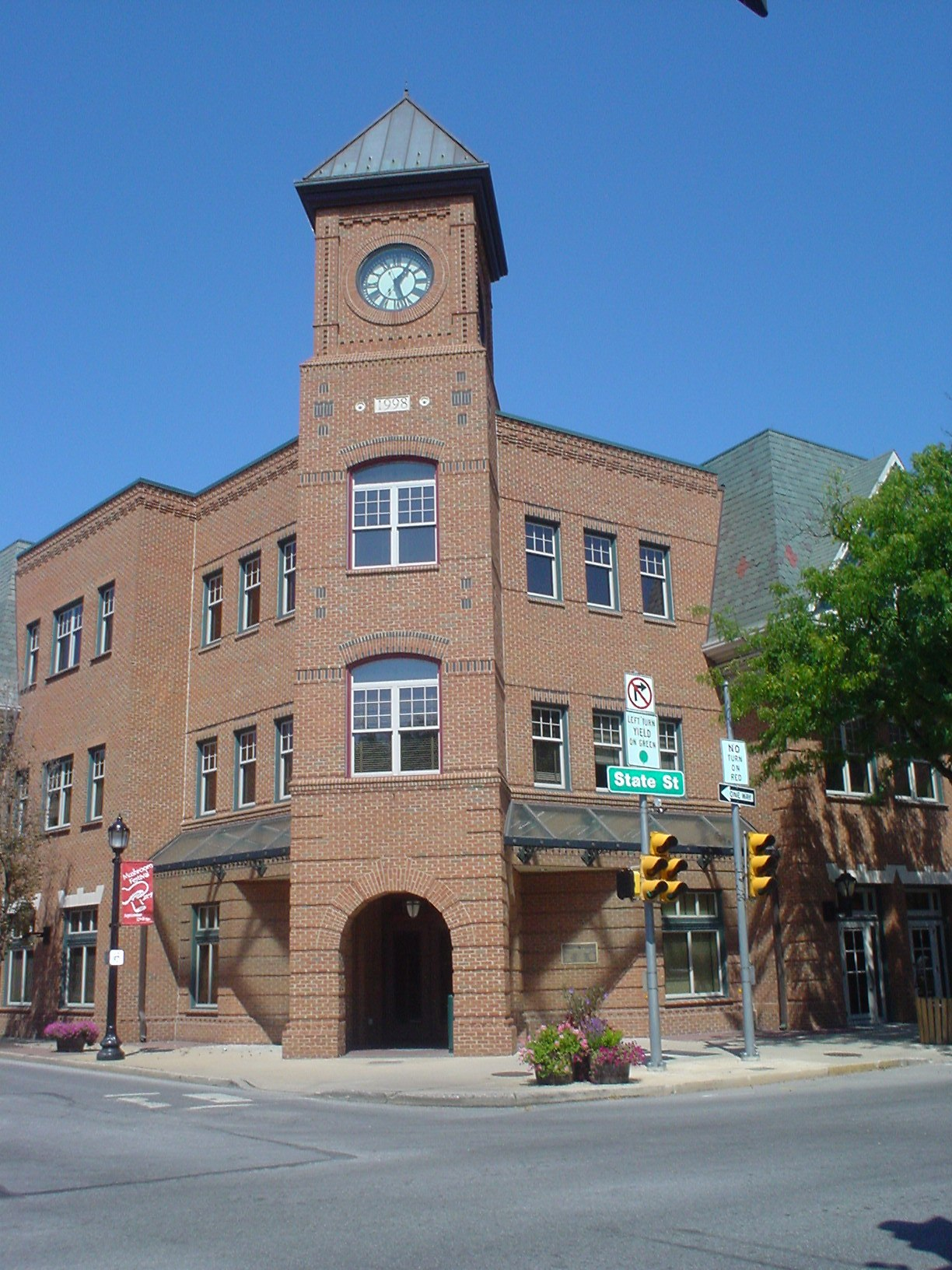
Clock tower on State Street

The borough is governed by the council–manager form of government. There are seven council members and a mayor, all elected by borough residents. The borough manager is an employee of the borough, hired by the council.

The current mayor is Matthew Fetick.

Borough Council of Kennett Squaree members:

- Bob Norris (president)
- Juan L. Tafolla (member of council; Pennsylvania politician)
- Michael Bertrando (member of council; actor)
- Doug Doerfler (member of council)

== Events ==
The 2026 Mushroom Festival

The Kennett Mushroom Festival is held annually in early September. The festival has been highlighted on Food TV. Annual parades are held on Memorial Day, Halloween, and before the Christmas holidays. Kennett Square celebrates Cinco de Mayo, which is organized by Casa Guanajuato and other local companies. A free summer concert series is held on Wednesday evenings at the over 100-acre Anson B Nixon Park.

In mid-May, the Kennett Run occurs, which ends at the Park pavilion. The Kennett Brewfest is held each Fall, featuring unlimited tastings of select brewers pouring different, rare, exclusive, limited, or seasonal beers. The local art galleries, studios, and independent boutiques participate in First Friday Art Strolls each month, presented by Historic Kennett Square. During temperate months, there is an outdoor farmers' market at the Genesis Walkway on State St. every Friday afternoon.

== Education ==
Kennett Square schools are all part of the Kennett Consolidated School District. This grouping of districts was the first consolidation of schools in the history of Pennsylvania. Students enrolled in kindergarten attend the Mary D. Lang Kindergarten Center. Grades 1 through 5 attend either Greenwood Elementary, Bancroft Elementary, or New Garden Elementary. For grades 6 through 8, all students attend Kennett Middle School. For grades 9 through 12, students attend Kennett High School.

U.S. Route 1 bypasses Kennett Square just to its north, and the area is assigned to the Unionville-Chadds Ford School District. Unionville High School, the only one in the Unionville-Chadds Ford School District, is located on Unionville Road (Pennsylvania State Route 82), approximately 2 miles north of the Borough of Kennett Square.

== Media ==
Kennett Square has three local newspapers: The Chester County Press, The Kennett Paper, and The Daily Local News. There are also two print magazines, Fig Kennett and Kennett Square Today.

== Points of interest ==
- East Penn Railroad
- Kennett Meetinghouse
- Longwood Gardens
- Talula's Table
- Episcopal Church of the Advent
- The Kennett Library
- St. Patrick Church

== Notable people ==
- Marino Auriti (1891–1980), artist and mechanic, creator of The Encyclopedic Palace of the World
- Justin Best (born 1997), Olympic rower
- Pat Ciarrocchi (born 1953), broadcast journalist
- Hannah M. Darlington (1808–1890), organizer of the Pennsylvania Woman's Convention at West Chester in 1852
- Bartholomew Fussell (1794–1871), physician and abolitionist active in the Underground Railroad
- Mike Grady (1869–1943), professional baseball player
- Doris Grumbach (1918–2022), novelist and biographer
- John Honnold (1915–2011), professor, University of Pennsylvania Law School
- Dugald C. Jackson (1865–1951), electrical engineer and professor at Massachusetts Institute of Technology
- Bruce Johnston (1939–2002), head of notorious Johnston Gang
- Herb Pennock (1894–1948), Hall of Fame baseball pitcher
- James M. Phillips (1822–1891), member of the Pennsylvania House of Representatives
- Jessica Savitch (1947–1983), former broadcast journalist
- William Marshall Swayne (1828–1918), sculptor
- Charles Frederick Taylor (1840–1863), U.S. army colonel killed at the Battle of Gettysburg
- Bayard Taylor (1825–1878), poet and travel writer
- Collin Walsh, musician with Grayscale, a pop punk band
- Harry Whitney (1873–1936), Arctic hunter, author, and adventurer

== See also ==
- National Register of Historic Places listings in Southern Chester County, Pennsylvania
