= Unionville-Chadds Ford School District =

School district in Pennsylvania, United States

Address
- 740 Unionville Road Kennett Square, Pennsylvania, 19348; United States

District information
- Type: Public
- Grades: K–12
- NCES District ID: 4224210

Students and staff
- Students: 3,897 (2021–2022)
- Teachers: 302.3 (on an FTE basis)
- Staff: 355.0 (on an FTE basis)
- Student–teacher ratio: 12.89

Other information
- Website: www.ucfsd.org

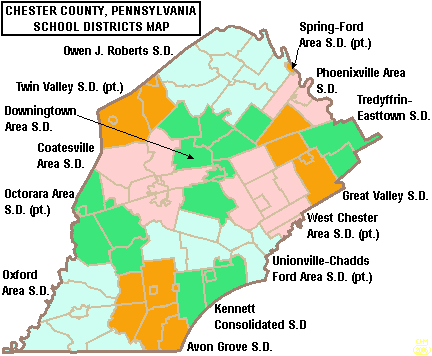
Map of Chester County, Pennsylvania public school districts with Unionville-Chadds Ford School District highlighted in blue in the eastern part of the county

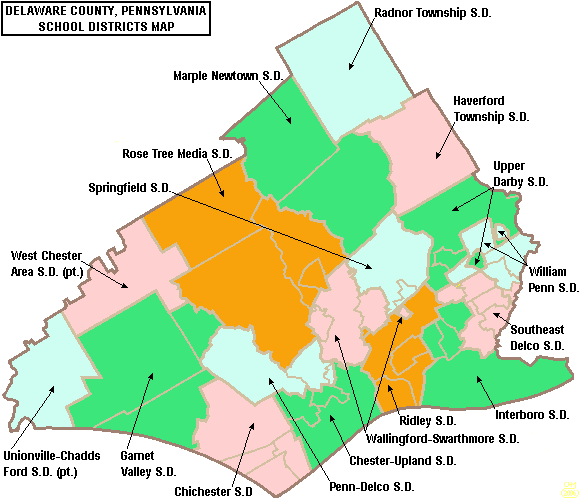
Map of Delaware County, Pennsylvania public school districts with Unionville-Chadds Ford School District highlighted in blue in the western corner of the county.

Unionville-Chadds Ford School District (UCFSD) is a school district in southeastern Chester County and western Delaware County, Pennsylvania, a 77-square-mile (200 km^{2}) area encompassing seven townships and serving a total of approximately 4,000 students.

The district is located in a fairly wealthy suburb of Philadelphia, the nation's sixth most-populous city, and Wilmington, Delaware. The district's budget, primarily obtained through property taxes, is approximately three times larger than the Pennsylvania average, at $53,902,000, equating to $12,877 spent by the district per student per year.

== Schools ==
- Unionville High School
- Charles F. Patton Middle School
- Unionville Elementary School
- Hillendale Elementary School
- Pocopson Elementary School
- Chadds Ford Elementary School

== Demographics ==
- White: 79.42%
- Asian: 12.93%
- Hispanic: 4.39%
- Black: 0.72%
- Native American: 0.05%

UCFSD has a significantly higher percent of White and Asian students and significantly lower percent of Black and Hispanic students than the Pennsylvania average.

- Male: 50.8%
- Female: 49.2%

== District administration ==
The district's offices are located in Unionville High School in Kennett Square. The current administration is as follows:
