= Charles Lewis =

Charles Lewis may refer to:

== Sportspeople ==
- Charles Lewis (cyclist) (born 1968), Belizean cyclist
- Charles Lewis (footballer) (1886–1967), English football player
- Charles Lewis (rugby union) (1853–1923), Welsh rugby international
- Charles Lewis (sculler) (died 1863), winner of the Wingfield Sculls in 1831 and 1833
- Charles B. Lewis (American football), American football coach
- Charles B. Lewis (athlete) (born 1937), American track and field athlete
- Charles L. Lewis (American football), head college football coach for the Tuskegee University Golden Tigers
- Charlie Lewis (1907–1972), American baseball player

== Politicians ==
- Charles Lewis (Australian politician) (1870–1935), Australian politician
- Charles Lewis (New Zealand politician) (1857–1927), New Zealand politician
- Charles Lewis (South African politician), mayor of Cape Town
- Charles G. Lewis (1823–?), American politician in Wisconsin
- Charles H. Lewis (1871–1965), American politician in Ohio
- Charles Hance Lewis (1816–?), American diplomat from Virginia, United States Ambassador to Portugal, 1870–1875
- Charles L. Lewis (California politician) (1966–2004), San Diego city council member
- Charles Lundy Lewis (1852–1936), American judge, justice of the Minnesota Supreme Court
- Charles S. Lewis (1821–1878), U.S. representative from Virginia
- Sir Charles Lewis, 1st Baronet (1825–1893), member of parliament for Londonderry City, 1872–1886, and North Antrim, 1887–1892
- Jerry Lewis (California politician) (Charles Jeremy Lewis, born 1934), U.S. representative from California

== Military ==
- Charles Lewis (soldier) (1733–1774), Virginian colonel killed in the Battle of Point Pleasant, namesake of Lewis County, West Virginia
- Charles Algernon Lewis (1807–1904), British Army officer
- Charles Lewis, African-American veteran lynched on December 16, 1918

== Artists ==
- Charles Lewis (painter) (1753–1795), English still life painter
- Charles Lewis Jr. (1963–2009), co-founder of Tapout clothing
- Charles Bertrand Lewis (1842–1924), American humorist also known as M. Quad
- Charles D. Lewis (born 1955), Barbadian musician
- Charles George Lewis (1808–1880), English engraver
- Charles James Lewis (1830–1892), English painter

== Other ==
- Charles Lewis (bookbinder) (1786–1836), English bookbinder
- Charles Lewis (journalist) (born 1953), founder of the Center for Public Integrity
- Charles Lewis (priest), Welsh Anglican priest
- Charles Lilburn Lewis (1747–1831), Virginia pioneer

== See also ==
- Charles Louis (disambiguation)
