= Charles B. Lewis =

Charles B. Lewis may refer to:

- Charles B. Lewis (American football), American football coach
- Charles B. Lewis (athlete) (born 1937), American track and field athlete
- Charles Bertrand Lewis (1842–1924), American journalist and humorist

== See also ==
- Charles Lewis (disambiguation)
