= Karl Ludwig =

Karl or Carl Ludwig may refer to:

- Charles I Louis, Elector Palatine (1617–1680)
- Karl Ludwig, Prince of Hohenlohe-Langenburg (1762–1825)
- Archduke Karl Ludwig of Austria (1833–1896)
- Carl Ludwig (1816–1895), German physician and physiologist
- Carl Ludwig II of Hohenlohe-Langenburg (1829–1907)
- Carl Ludwig (Medal of Honor) (1841–1913), Union Army soldier and Medal of Honor recipient
- Karl Ludwig (footballer) (1886–1948), German footballer
- Archduke Carl Ludwig of Austria (1918–2007)
- Karl Ludwig (sledge hockey) (born 1988), Canadian ice sledge hockey player

== See also ==
- Charles Louis
