= V. Floyd Campbell =

American illustrator and caricaturist (1873–1906)

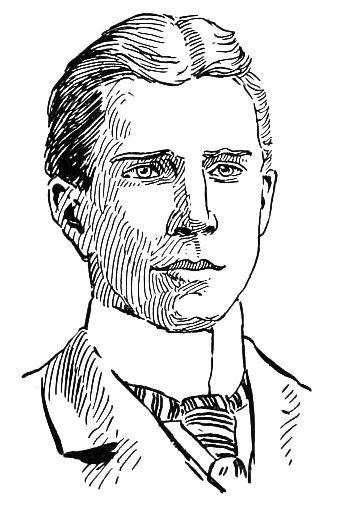

V. Floyd Campbell (1873 – April 22, 1906) was an American illustrator and caricaturist.

Campbell was born in Port Austin, Michigan, the son of a blacksmith, and graduated high school in 1890. He entered the service of Charles Bertrand Lewis the same year, illustrating The Lime Kiln Club and other books, and credited Lewis with much of the success he later attained. He began his newspaper work with the Detroit Free Press, meanwhile studying at the Museum of Art with Joseph Giles; several years later studying at the Detroit Art Academy under the same master. Between 1891 and 1894 he was employed with various engraving firms in Grand Rapids, Lansing, and St. Paul, at the same time contributing to the newspapers of each place.

After a short course of study in Chicago, he returned to the Free Press, remaining there until the fall of 1897. He was first employed in New York by the New York World and later by the New York Herald, for which paper he acted as a special artist during the Spanish–American War. He moved to Philadelphia in 1899, where he contributed to The North American, The Philadelphia Inquirer, The Philadelphia Press, Philadelphia Bulletin, and Philadelphia Evening Telegraph. His caricatures of politicians were popular during the 1904 Republican National Convention, and he illustrated The Roosevelt Bears by Seymour Eaton, a comic strip with the distinction of being the only strip ever run by The New York Times. His portraits and more serious work appeared in The Booklovers Magazine and book illustrations.

He died in Morton, Pennsylvania, of tuberculosis.
