= Lime Kiln Field Day =

1913 film

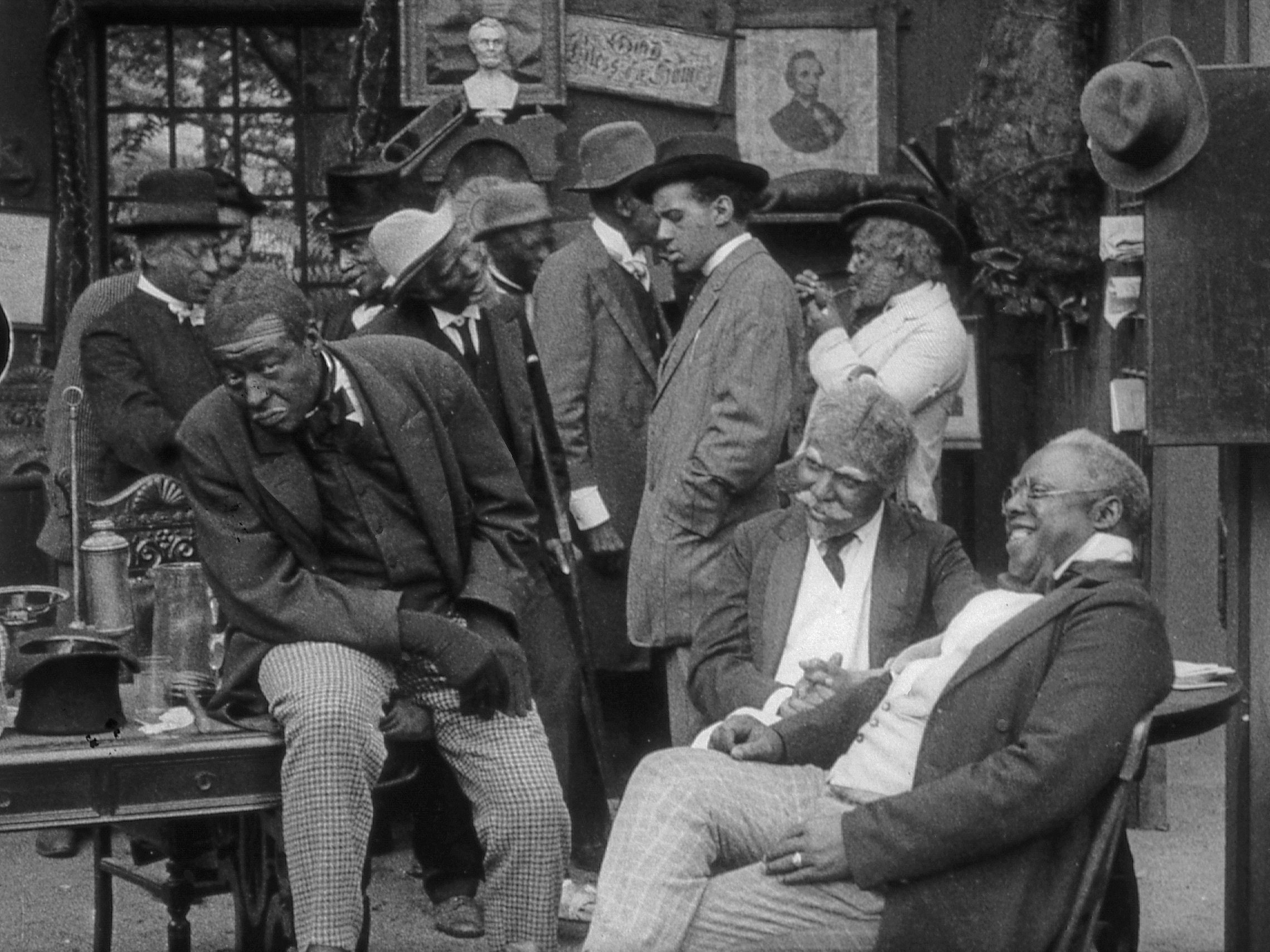
- Still from the film
- Directed by: Edwin Middleton; T. Hayes Hunter; Sam Corker Jr. (asst. dir.)
- Written by: Charles Bertrand Lewis, Brother Gardner's Lime-Kiln Club (humor sketches for Detroit Free Press)
- Produced by: Klaw and Erlanger
- Starring: Bert Williams; Odessa Warren Grey; Sam Lucas; Sam Corker Jr. Abbie Mitchell
- Production company: Biograph Company
- Release date: 1913
- Running time: 65 minutes; 7 reels (unfinished, unedited)
- Country: United States
- Languages: Silent film (no English intertitles)

Lime Kiln Field Day (also known as Lime Kiln Club Field Day or Bert Williams: Lime Kiln Field Day) is a 1913 American black-and-white silent film produced by the Biograph Company and Klaw and Erlanger. Unnamed, unassembled, and abandoned by its producers during post-production, the original footage was saved when Biograph donated its vaults to the Museum of Modern Art in 1938. It is considered to be the oldest surviving feature film with an all-Black cast.

== Cast ==
Led by the famous Caribbean-American musical theater performer and recording artist Bert Williams, the cast involved Harlem-based entertainment pioneers Sam Lucas, Abbie Mitchell, J. Leubrie Hill, Emma Reed, John Wesley (Wes) Jenkins (1859–1930), Walker Thompson (1887–1922), Billy Harper, and other theater performers, including members of J. Leubrie Hill's Darktown Follies stage company.

== Production ==
Biograph Company produced the film for Marcus Klaw and A. L. Erlanger in the Bronx, New York. Lime Kiln Field Day was shot at locations in New York as well as New Jersey using a 35mm camera at 19fps.

After filming over an hour of footage, the producers Klaw and Erlanger abandoned the project during post-production, leaving the film to be without a title and locked away by the Biograph Film Studio.

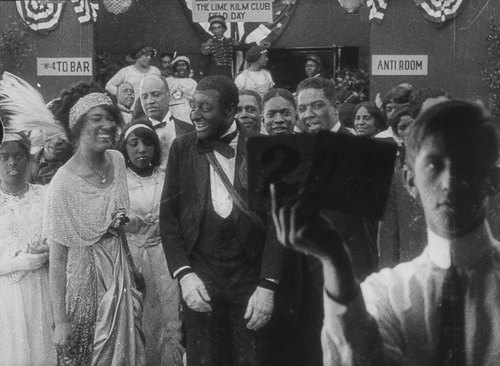
Cast and crew of Lime Kiln Field Day (1913)

== Screenings of restored footage ==
In 2014, the film was deemed "culturally, historically, or aesthetically significant" by the Library of Congress and selected for preservation in the National Film Registry. Screenings of the restored footage took place in October 2014 at the Museum of Modern Art in New York, and on June 1, 2015, at the San Francisco Silent Film Festival. A screening of the film was scheduled for May 2018 at the Harry Ransom Center in Austin.

== Preservation ==
The only written reference to the footage was found in an obituary in the New York Age (August 1914) for Sam Corker Jr., a member of the films production crew. The obituary stated "Last fall he employed a large number of colored performers for the 'Lime Kiln Film Club' series of motion pictures produced by Klaw and Erlanger in which Bert A. Williams will be featured."

In 1939, Iris Barry, film curator of the Museum of Modern Art, saved the reels, which formed part of MoMA's early film collection. The negatives of the film were discovered in a cache of 900 film canisters donated from the Actinograph Corp. Bronx Biograph studio and laboratory facilities from the contents of its film vaults. The Museum of Modern Art eventually made the first print of the film in 1976. The museum would go on to name the film Bert Williams: Lime Kiln Field Day. The title of the film came from one of the sources for the film's narrative, a stage routine based on a fictional black social club, the Lime Kiln Club.

No script, intertitles, or production credits for the film survived. By examining the footage frame by frame, and by hiring a lip reader to determine the dialogue, Museum of Modern Art curators reconstructed the planned film's narrative. As well as the footage, nearly 100 still images of the interracial production were recovered from within the unedited material, providing evidence of an historic effort. The photos show two white directors, Edwin Middleton and T. Hayes Hunter, as well as white crewmembers.

== Synopsis ==
A summary of the film was written for the 9th annual "Orphan Film Symposium" at EYE Film Institute Netherlands:

"Man about town and resident schemer (Bert Williams) is on the lookout for the next opportunity to advance his interests. As a member of the fraternal Lime Kiln Club headed by Brother Gardner, he becomes involved in a contest with rival suitors to win the hand of the local beauty (Odessa Warren Grey)."

"Backed by white speculators, the club organizes its annual field day for black townsfolk who assemble outside the club bar and parade to the fairground led by a marching band. The day’s activities include dining on fried chicken and ice cream, wrestling for loose shoes and a greased pig, a watermelon-eating contest, a spirited cakewalk, a ride on a merry-go-round, and a 100-yard dash, which Bert wins against a pint-sized competitor."

"Eyeing a man with a jug of gin, Bert sees the drink being hidden in a well and retrieves it for a taste before accidentally knocking the jug into the well. Undaunted, he writes "Gin Spring" on the wooden well enclosure and calls fairgoers over to sample the tasty polluted waters. Suddenly finding himself an entrepreneur, he sells his "discovery" to his rivals for a handful of cash and goes off with the girl for a day of food and fun."

== Black characterization ==
Walter Ray Watson of NPR analyzed the film as showing Black characters in scenes of play and leisure, as well as lighthearted slapstick. This contrasts with the many depictions of Black characters in cinema in the 1910s, which commonly made Black people out to be violent and greedy; D. W. Griffith's The Birth of a Nation was regarded by Watson as exemplary of these depictions.

In the film, Bert Williams performs in blackface. Museum of Modern Art curator Ron Magliozzi said that in its initial screening, the film's scenes with Williams were "a sop to the white audience". Theater conventions of the day required one performer in a "black musical"—whichever ways it was advertised—to wear blackface, while the rest of the cast could perform without makeup. According to film critic Yasmina Price, Williams' use of blackface was not only conventional, but an intentional and strategic use of it by a Black actor to delineate his performance; Williams repeated this use of blackface in other productions.

Williams, the romantic lead, embraces and kisses Odessa Warren Grey's character at the conclusion of the film. Intimacy between a Black man and a Black woman was rarely seen not just in cinema but in popular culture of the period, and Watson highlighted the scene as another positive depiction of Black characters.

== Film debut ==
After being in post-production for over 100 years, the film Bert Williams: Lime Kiln Field Day debuted excerpts and stills on October 24, 2014, at the Museum of Modern Art, in the Roy and Niuta Titus Theatre lobby galleries. The full 60 minutes of restored footage was premiered on November 8, 2014, in the Museum of Modern Art's annual "To Save and Project" festival dedicated to film preservation.

On June 1, 2015, the film was shown with live piano accompaniment by Donald Sosin at the San Francisco Silent Film Festival.

== National Film Registry ==
In 2014, the film was deemed "culturally, historically, or aesthetically significant" by the Library of Congress and selected for preservation in the National Film Registry. In their press release, the Library cited that by "providing insight into early silent-film production... these outtakes or rushes show white and black cast and crew working together, enjoying themselves in unguarded moments. Even in fragments of footage, Williams proves himself among the most gifted of screen comedians."

== See also ==
- List of rediscovered films
- African American cinema
