= Charles Louis =

Charles Louis may refer to:

== Nobility ==
- Charles I Louis, Elector Palatine (1617–1680)
- Charles Louis Auguste Fouquet, duc de Belle-Isle (1684–1761), French general and statesman
- Duke Charles Louis Frederick of Mecklenburg (1708–1752), father of Queen Charlotte of the United Kingdom
- Charles Louis, Hereditary Prince of Baden (1755–1801)
- Charles Louis Huguet, 1st Marquis of Sémonville (1759–1839), French diplomat and politician
- Napoleon III, formerly Charles Louis Napoléon Bonaparte (1808–1873), 1st President of France, later Emperor of the French
- Charles Auguste Louis Joseph, duc de Morny (1811–1865), French statesman
- Archduke Karl Ludwig of Austria (1833–1896), father of Archduke Franz Ferdinand of Austria
- Archduke Carl Ludwig of Austria (1918–2007)
- Charles Louis, Count of Marsan (1696–1755), French nobleman and general
- Charles Louis, Count of Nassau-Saarbrücken (1665–1723)
- Charles Louis, Duke of Schleswig-Holstein-Sonderburg-Beck (1690–1774), lieutenant general in the Prussian Army
- Charles Louis, Prince of Anhalt-Bernburg-Schaumburg-Hoym (1723–1806)

== Other people ==
- Charles-Louis Richard (1711–1794), Catholic theologian
- Charles-Louis Clérisseau (1721–1820), French architectural draughtsman
- Charles Louis L'Héritier de Brutelle (1746–1800), French botanist and magistrate
- Charles-Louis de Fourcroy (born 1766), French consul at A Coruña
- Antoine Charles Louis de Lasalle (1775–1809), French cavalry general during the Revolutionary and Napoleonic Wars
- Charles-Louis Havas (1783–1858), French writer and founder of the news agency Agence France-Presse (AFP)
- Charles-Louis Hanon (1819–1900), French piano pedagogue and composer
- Charles Louis Kincannon (born 1940), former director of the United States Census Bureau
- Charles-Louis Seck (born 1965), retired Senegalese athlete

== See also ==
- Charles Lewis (disambiguation)
- Karl Ludwig (disambiguation)
