= Avon Grove School District =

School district in Pennsylvania

Address
- 375 South Jennersville Road West Grove, Pennsylvania, 19390; United States

District information
- Type: Public

Students and staff
- District mascot: Red Devils
- Colors: Maroon, gold

Other information
- Website: www.avongrove.org

The Avon Grove School District (AGSD) is a publicly funded, K-12 school district located in Chester County, Pennsylvania, serving over 5,000 students in four schools: Penn London Elementary School (K–2), Avon Grove Intermediate School (3–5), Avon Grove Middle School (6–8), and Avon Grove High School (9–12).

== Geography ==
The district is located in a rural-suburban setting 34 miles (55 km) southwest of Philadelphia, Pennsylvania, and 18 miles (29 km) northwest of Wilmington, Delaware. Avon Grove covers 67 sq mi (170 km^{2}) and consists of five townships:

- Franklin Township
- London Grove Township
- London Britain Township
- New London Township
- Penn Township

Avondale and West Grove are two boroughs within London Grove Township. Due to the closeness of the two boroughs (less than three miles in distance from each other), it was natural that the area became known as Avon Grove.

== Schools within the district ==
- Penn London Elementary School (K-1) 39.7987°N 75.8837°W
- Avon Grove Intermediate School (2–5) 39.7961°N 75.8846°W
- Avon Grove Middle School (6–8) 39.8150°N 75.8150°W
- Avon Grove High School (9–12) 39.8150°N 75.8150°W
- Avon Grove Charter School 39.8248°N 75.8039°W

== Co-curricular activities ==
At Avon Grove School District, co-curricular opportunities begin in third grade, promoting academic achievement while enhancing teaching and learning. The district offers a large variety of clubs, activities and sports.
