= Lime Kiln Club =

Fictional fraternal organization

The Lime-Kiln Club was a fictitious fraternal organization of African Americans created by writer and journalist Charles Bertrand Lewis for the Detroit Free Press in the late 19th century.

== Newspaper weekly ==
The Free Press was a Democratic weekly paper owned by the Scripps brothers, and it was notable in its era for humor, low cost, and reliance on advertising revenue. The two-cent price point of the paper (significantly lower than other publications) allowed for widespread distribution to working class audiences. This business model relied on high circulation as a selling point for advertising.

The Detroit Free Press first published the Brother Gardner's Lime Kiln Club in 1878. Author Charles Bertrand Lewis, a Union veteran and staff writer since 1869, was a popular humorist for the paper, wrote under the pen name "M. Quad". Lewis's Lime Kiln Club was a fictional, African American, fraternal organization featuring negative stereotypes of Black people in an appeal to working-class Democrats during a racially charged era. Lewis wrote his pieces in African American dialect and spoken by characters with names like Brother Gardner, Waydown Bebee, and Elder Toots. Each Lime Kiln Club episode follows a club debate on issues of politics, economics, and philosophy. The absurdity and ignorance of these discussions served to satirize both African Americans and politicians.

The column proved hugely popular, and it was syndicated nationally and published as a book, Brother Gardner's Lime-Kiln Club: being the regular proceedings of the regular club for the last three years; with some philosophy, considerable music, a few lectures, and a heap of advice wirth reading,' in 1887. Charles Lewis ceased writing Lime Kiln Club stories when he left The Detroit Free Press for a higher salary at New York World in 1891.

== Adaptations ==
=== Vaudeville ===
The original Detroit Free Press' column was also adapted for vaudeville performance. Evidence in the form of advertisements and a review from Variety magazine in 1909 reveal that the 25-minute performance was well received in New York. The magazine also reveals that the show was put on by George Walker and Bert Williams troupe. This duo achieved fame for their performances in black face under the name "Two Real Coons", a title chosen to distinguish themselves from minstrelry performances by white actors in black face. Their performance of the Lime Kiln Club also featured famed black actors Abbie Mitchell and Tom Fletcher.

==== Bert William's Lime Kiln Field Day ====
In 1913, Biograph Studios began production on an untitled film adaption of The Lime Kiln Club directed by Edwin Middleton and T. Hayes Hunter. William's Lime Kiln Field Day proceeded D.W. Griffith's The Birth Of A Nation by two years. It stands in contrast to Griffith's film as one of the only surviving silent films with an all black cast. The film followed a day of romance between stars Bert Williams and Odessa Warren Grey. The film was cancelled early for unknown reasons, and in 1938 Biograph donated the negatives to the Museum of Modern Art. In 2014, museum staff reassembled the seven reels of raw footage in order to screen the film publicly for the first time. The negative footage of Bert William's Lime Kiln Field Day screening is notably accompanied by video footage and still images of interaction between the film's black cast and white production crew.
