= Dansko =

American footwear company

- Type: Private/Employee Owned
- Industry: Footwear
- Founders: Peter Kjellerup and Mandy Cabot
- Headquarters: West Grove, Pennsylvania, United States
- Area served: North America, Asia, Australia, and New Zealand
- Key people: Mandy Cabot, CEO
- Products: Clogs and other footwear
- Number of employees: 185
- Website: dansko.com

Dansko is a comfort footwear company based in West Grove, Pennsylvania. Dansko was founded in 1990 by husband and wife team, Peter Kjellerup and Mandy Cabot. Most well known for its clogs, Dansko also makes dress and casual shoes, sandals, and boots.

== History ==
On a trip to Denmark in the late 1980s, Mandy Cabot and Peter Kjellerup came across clogs that worked well for their equestrian needs. The couple operated a farm where they worked as horse trainers and dressage instructors. After bringing back clogs for their farm staff on several trips to Denmark, Cabot and Kjellerup decided to establish Dansko in 1990. Dansko has since added several shoe styles, including sandals, boots, heels, flats, and more types of clogs. Inc. Magazine named Dansko in its list of 500 fastest-growing private companies in 1999 and 2000.

In 2012, 80% of Dansko's shoes were made in China; 20% in Italy. In early years, the company worked with a Danish partner and manufactured shoes in Europe (including Poland). Beginning in 1995, the company attempted to manufacture some product in the US but challenges related to lack of expertise in the labor force were deemed insurmountable and much manufacturing was shifted to China. In an effort to increase operational efficiency, Dansko opened a new, larger facility with 46 Kiva robots to assist with processing order fulfillment needs in November 2012. Also, at the new facility, distance walked by employees during a workday decreased.

The Dansko Foundation, a non-profit run by employees, was founded in 2003. In 2005, Dansko launched its Employee Stock Ownership Plan (ESOP), which fosters employee ownership. The company was able to buy back all previously issued stock and operate as a completely employee owned company by 2012. In 2007, Dansko started selling beyond North America, with vendors in Australia, New Zealand, Asia and Europe. Dansko is sold at 2,500 retailers which include department stores, shoe stores, and online retailers.

In July 2014, Dansko clogs were featured in a photo displaying the Normcore fashion trend alongside Dolce & Gabbana. Today Style featured Dansko's Trista clog as one of the most comfy shoes. In September 2014, Dansko was recognized on B Corp's "Best for Workers" list.

== Shoe features ==
Dansko clogs feature anatomically contoured arch support, a rocker-bottom sole and a slightly raised heel. These features are meant to offer increased shock absorbency, extra stability and ease leg and back muscles of wearers who stand or walk for many hours a day. Dansko shoes are particularly popular with occupational professionals who spend most of the day on their feet, like teachers, chefs, and those in the medical field, but are also worn by others for comfort and support. Most Dansko shoes have the Seal of Acceptance from the American Podiatric Medical Association (APMA) and many styles are slip-resistant. Footwear Plus Magazine has awarded Dansko with the "Plus Award" in the Women's Comfort category eight times.

== Dansko Foundation ==
The Dansko Foundation is a nonprofit corporation founded in 2003 to benefit philanthropy, voluntarism, and grant making foundations. The Dansko Foundation is staffed by Dansko employees, who are given 20 hours of paid time off a year with which to volunteer. Dansko also makes a charitable donation equal to the employee's salary for hours an employee volunteered.

== Certifications ==
The Delaware Valley Green Building Council and the American Sustainable Business Council have recognized Dansko's environmental efforts. Both Dansko's headquarters and distribution center are LEED certified buildings. Dansko has been a B-Corporation certified company since December 2007. The American Podiatric Medical Association (APMA) has awarded many Dansko shoe styles its Seal of Acceptance, which recognizes products that promote quality foot health.
