= Avon Grove High School =

Location
- 10 Waltman Way; West Grove, Chester County, Pennsylvania 19390; United States; 39°49′11″N 75°51′40″W

Information
- Type: Public
- Motto: In Pursuit of Excellence
- Established: 1928
- School district: Avon Grove School District
- Superintendent: Dr. Scott DeShong
- Principal: Christie Snead
- Staff: 104.24 (FTE)
- Grades: 9-12
- Enrollment: 1,761 (2023-2024)
- Student to teacher ratio: 16.89
- Colors: Maroon and gold
- Mascot: Red Devil
- Rival: Oxford High School
- Newspaper: The Devil's Herald
- Website: School website

Avon Grove High School is a public high school located in southern Chester County, Pennsylvania, United States. It is part of the Avon Grove School District.

Avon Grove High School enrolls about ~1,826 students in grades 9-12.

== History ==
Avon Grove High School was first established in 1928 with Pierre S. du Pont being involved in designing its first building, as part of the newly formed Avon Grove Consolidated School. This new school brought together several smaller community schools in the area. In 1957, a new high school building was constructed to accommodate the district’s growing student population, and that facility served generations of students before later being converted into a middle school in 2023. In June 2020, construction started on a brand new campus for Avon Grove High School as class occupancy exceeded fifty percent over its maximum. By September 2022, the campus located in Jennersville, Pennsylvania was functional enough to allow for the 2022-23 school year. The estimated cost of the new campus is projected to be $211,849,264. Avon Grove High School developed a strong academic and extracurricular reputation, including recognition from the College Board’s AP Honor Roll in the early 2010s for expanding Advanced Placement opportunities.

=== 2023 Swatting Incident ===
On October 10, 2023, just before 10:00 a.m., the main office of the Avon Grove High School received a phone call from an unknown number. The caller claimed to be near the school with a gun and that they were going to enter the high school's gym. Immediately, Dr. Christie Snead, the school principal, announced on the PA system that the school was going into lockdown. The Pennsylvania State Police arrived shortly after and began searching the campus. The call was traced to a number in Nebraska that had been used in several other swatting incidents across the country. Due to the cafeteria having many windows, there was a lack of space to provide cover during a lockdown. As such, some students from the cafeteria decided to leave the building and run to the shops at Jennersville as they felt that it would be the safest place. Others found hiding spots in the serving area of the cafeteria. The gym was the most vulnerable area as that was where the intruder claimed to be entering. Throughout the incident, Dr. Snead and Mrs. Penn gave out further instructions and police whereabouts in the building over the intercom and via email. At 10:45 a.m., it was announced that the high school was still in restricted movement to help the police manage the flow of students throughout the building. An announcement was made around this time that they would have an early dismissal and students would be able to use the restroom. At 11:20 a.m., students were dismissed from school, and all after-school activities were canceled.

== Athletics ==
Avon Grove High School offers 16 unique varsity sports that vary between genders. The school has three different sports seasons. The sports offered by the schools are as follows:

=== Fall Sports ===
- Cheerleading (Girls)
- Cross Country (Boys + Girls)
- Field Hockey (Girls)
- Football (Boys)
- Golf (Boys + Girls)
- Soccer (Boys + Girls)
- Tennis (Girls)
- Volleyball (Girls)

=== Winter Sports ===
- Basketball (Boys + Girls)
- Cheerleading (Girls)
- Track & Field (Boys + Girls)
- Swimming & Diving (Boys + Girls)
- Wrestling (Boys + Girls)

=== Spring Sports ===
- Baseball (Boys)
- Flag Football (Girls)
- Lacrosse (Boys + Girls)
- Softball (Girls)
- Track & Field (Boys + Girls)
- Tennis (Boys)
- Volleyball (Boys)

=== State Championships ===
==== Team Championships ====
- 1970 - Boys Basketball (PIAA Class B)
- 1977 - Girls Track & Field (PIAA 2A)
- 2017 - Girls Swimming & Diving (PIAA 3A)
- 2017 - Boys Lacrosse (PIAA 3A)

==== Individual Championships ====
- 1936- Boys 220y - Charlie White (PIAA Class B Track & Field)
- 1953 - Boys Long Jump - Joe Lewis (PIAA Class B Track & Field)
- 1954 - Boys High Jump - Willard McKim (PIAA Class B Track & Field)
- 1954 - Boys 440y - Charles Lewis (PIAA Class B Track & Field)
- 1954 - Boys 100y - Joe Lewis (PIAA Class B Track & Field)
- 1955 - Boys 100y - Charles Lewis (PIAA Class B Track & Field)
- 1958 - Boys 100y - Vaughn Morgan (PIAA Class B Track & Field)
- 1976 - Girls 4x220y (PIAA 2A Track & Field)
- 1977 - Girls 100y - Debbie Lewis (PIAA 2A Track & Field)
- 1977 - Girls 220y - Debbie Lewis (PIAA 2A Track & Field)
- 1977 - Girls 4x440y (PIAA 2A Track & Field)
- 1978 - Girls 100y - Debbie Lewis (PIAA 2A Track & Field)
- 1978 - Girls 220y - Debbie Lewis (PIAA 2A Track & Field)
- 1979 - Girls 100m - Debbie Lewis (PIAA 2A Track & Field)
- 1979 - Girls 220y - Debbie Lewis (PIAA 2A Track & Field)
- 1979 - Girls Long Jump - Debbie Lewis (PIAA 2A Track & Field)
- 1990 - Girls Long Jump - Tolanda Cain (PIAA 2A Track & Field)
- 2014 - Girls 400m - McKenna Keegan (PIAA 3A Track & Field)
- 2015 - Girls 400m - McKenna Keegan (PIAA 3A Track & Field)
- 2016 - Girls 200y individual medley - Olivia Paoletti (PIAA 3A Swimming)
- 2017 - Girls 100y breast stroke - Olivia Paoletti (PIAA 3A Swimming)
- 2017 - Girls 200y individual medley - Olivia Paoletti (PIAA 3A Swimming)
- 2017 - Girls 200y Medley Relay (PIAA 3A Swimming)
- 2025 - Girls High Jump - Lexi Boiardi (PTFCA Track & Field)
- 2026 - Boys Discus - Grayson Pitman (PIAA Track & Field)

=== Ten Mile Rivalry ===
Avon Grove High School and Oxford Area High School play in a rivalry football game under the name the "Ten Mile Rivalry". Since 2024, the teams play for the Ten Mile Rivalry Milk Jug as their rivalry trophy. Avon Grove leads the series 13-7.

Avon Grove victories	Oxford victories	Tie games

No.	Date	Location	Winner	Score
1	2002	West Grove, PA	Avon Grove	12–7
2	2003	Oxford, PA	Avon Grove	55–14
3	2004	Oxford, PA	Avon Grove	21–0
4	2005	Oxford, PA	Avon Grove	42–14
5	2006	West Grove, PA	Avon Grove	21–3
6	2007	Oxford, PA	Avon Grove	34–14
7	2008	West Grove, PA	Avon Grove	37–7
8	2009	Oxford, PA	Avon Grove	48–21
9	2010	West Grove, PA	Avon Grove	33–6
10	2011	Oxford, PA	Oxford	21–17
11	2012	West Grove, PA	Oxford	33–7

No.	Date	Location	Winner	Score
12	2013	Oxford, PA	Oxford	27–26
13	2014	Oxford, PA	Oxford	38–28
14	2015	Oxford, PA	Avon Grove	21–7
15	2016	West Grove, PA	Avon Grove	14–13
16	2022	West Grove, PA	Oxford	28–16
17	2023	Oxford, PA	Avon Grove	17–13
18	2024	West Grove, PA	Oxford	17–14
19	2025	Oxford, PA	Oxford	14–7
20	2026	West Grove, PA	Avon Grove	35–14
21				
Series: Avon Grove leads 13–7

== Notable alumni ==
- Charles B. Lewis, athlete, Winston-Salem State University
- Joey Wendle, professional baseball player, New York Mets
