= Karl Ludwig (footballer) =

German footballer (1886–1948)

Personal information
- Date of birth: 14 May 1886
- Date of death: 3 February 1948 (aged 61)
- Position: Midfielder

Senior career*
Years	Team	Apps	(Gls)
- SC 99 Köln

International career
1908	Germany	1	(0)
- * Club domestic league appearances and goals

Karl Ludwig (14 May 1886 – 3 February 1948) was a German international footballer.
