= Carl Ludwig (Medal of Honor) =

- Born: May 10, 1841; Germany or France
- Died: May 16, 1913 (aged 72); Queens County, New York
- Military career
- Allegiance: United States of America; Union
- Branch: United States Army; Union Army
- Service years: 1861 - 1865
- Rank: Corporal
- Unit: (New York (state)) 34th Independent Battery New York Light Artillery
- Conflicts: American Civil War
- Awards: Medal of Honor

Carl Ludwig was a Private in the Union Army, received the Medal of Honor, on July 30, 1896, for his brave and gallant action at the Second Battle of Petersburg, Virginia, during the American Civil War.

== Medal of Honor citation ==
- Rank and organization: Private, 34th New York Battery.
- Place and date: Petersburg, Virginia., June 18, 1864.
- Birth: France.
- Date of issue: July 30, 1896

Citation:

As gunner of his piece, inflicted singly a great loss upon the enemy and distinguished himself in the removal of the piece while under a heavy fire.

== See also ==
- List of Medal of Honor recipients
- List of American Civil War Medal of Honor recipients: G–L
