= Odessa Warren Grey =

American actress

Odessa Warren Grey (August 13, 1883 - April 28, 1960) was milliner, entrepreneur, and performer in Harlem, New York. She is best known as the star of the silent film, Lime Kiln Field Day (1913) where she co-stars with Bert Williams.

== Early life ==
Little is known of Odessa Warren's early life. According to her entry in Frank Lincoln Mather's Who's Who of the Colored Race: A General Biographical Dictionary of Men and Women of African Descent (1915), she was born in Greenfield, Ohio, on August 13, 1883, to Edward A. and Sadie K. (Tyre) Warren. However, the 1900 Federal Census lists Edward and Sadie Warren as having been married for six years (or since 1894), with daughter Odessa aged 17.

Warren exhibited a number of talents from an early age. An accomplished seamstress, clothes designer and milliner, she also was a dancer and singer in minstrel shows, vaudeville, and the musical productions that heralded the beginning of the tradition of African-American musical theater. She, with her cousin, actress Madge Warren (born Madge Wadkins), were in the traveling companies of Bert Williams and George Walker's The Policy Players (1899-1900). After Madge left the stage to marry the world lightweight boxing champion Joe Gans, Warren continued to perform in vaudeville, and in 1902, joined Williams and Walker's production In Dahomey.

In 1903 this production, with music by Will Marion Cook and lyrics by Paul Laurence Dunbar moved to New York City, where it became the first black musical to open on Broadway. Warren toured with the show to London, returning to New York City with the company on the S.S. Aurania in June 1904. In 1906, again with her cousin Madge (now separated from her husband), Warren was in Ernest Hogan's show Rufus Rastus.

Warren continued on the stage while attending to the costume needs of the women of the theatrical profession. In 1908, she announced her retirement from the stage in order to "confine her labors in the direction of business pursuits." She decided to go full-time as a milliner after making the "Bon Bon Buddy" hats for the women of the "Williams and Walker Show, and was praised in the highest terms by the management for her work."

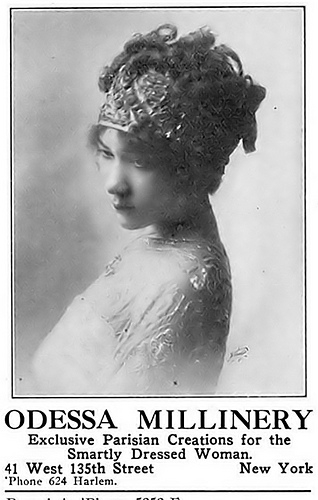
An ad for Odessa Millinery in a newspaper in 1913, when it was at the 41 West 135th Street location

Her millinery business was called the "Pioneer millinery establishment by Negroes in Harlem" in a newspaper article in February 1921. Warren started the business in her home and then moved to a small shop at 41 W 135th Street, Harlem. Her business continued to grow and after five years, moved to a larger location at 2221 Seventh Ave. In 1921, the store reportedly had one of the largest stocks of any millinery store in Harlem, and had trained and employed several young women as milliners.

In June 1909, she married musician and actor Joseph W. Grey (1879-1956). Warren continued to prosper in her business, and also continued to participate in social and entertainment-oriented affairs, including presentations designed for charitable purposes where she either supplied costumes, or actually performed, or both. For example, in May 1909, "Miss Odessa Warren" participated in a benefit for the "Children's Home" of St. Philip's Episcopal Church of Harlem, that was organized by Aida Overton Walker, Richard C. McPherson and John E. Nail and held at the old Grand Central Palace at Lexington Avenue and East 43rd Street. Coming on after the opening number, Warren, with fellow dancer and actress Maggie Davis (who later married Jesse Shipp) gave a spirited rendition of Joe Jordan's "That Teasin' Rag"; "Misses Davis and Warren are considered two of the best chorus girls in the business, and they lived up to the reputations they established." In January 1912, Odessa Warren Grey was crowned "Queen Odessa" at the New Star Casino during a Mardi Gras celebration.

== Lime Kiln Field Day ==
In unedited footage of a film shot in 1913, Warren stars opposite Bert Williams as a local beauty he's trying to woo. The seven reels of what is now being called Bert Williams' Lime Kiln Field Day features a black cast and white crew, and is now the earliest surviving feature-length film in which the main characters are black and middle class.

The cast is made of black performers from Harlem five years before what is thought of as the official start of the Harlem Renaissance. In addition to the legendary Bert Williams the film also features Sam Lucas, Abbie Mitchell and J. Leubrie Hill with members of the Darktown Follies Company.

The film is remarkable in a number of ways. One of the three directors of the film was a black man, and the footage shows a lot of interaction between the black cast and white crew. Bert Williams is seen in blackface before he became famous on Broadway, and the romance between Bert Williams and Warren is a first example of affection for black characters in film. The film also has one of the longest early records of black vernacular dance on film, an elaborate cakewalk scene. The film features some racial stereotypes but also shows interactions between black cast members and white crew members. The film "documents the effort by a community of virtuoso performers to achieve increased visibility in a time of segregation", framed with a blend of minstrel and contemporary performance styles.

The film was being produced by the Biograph Company for Klaw and Erlanger, and was directed by Edwin Middleton, T. Hunter Hayes, and Sam Corker Jr. However, the film was never released and the reels were found in 1938 by Museum of Modern Art staff members at an abandoned Biograph Studios site in New York. The reasons that Biograph did not finish the film are unknown, but Ronald S. Maggliozzi, an associate curator in the Museum of Modern Art's film department, theorizes that D. W. Griffith's Birth of a Nation (1915) had something to do with it. The Lime Kiln Field Day footage has been recently discovered and restored by the Museum of Modern Art after 101 years, and is currently on display in the museum.

== Amsterdam News, second marriage, and later years ==
Grey's parents were involved in the ownership and operation of the weekly newspaper, the Amsterdam News. Edward A. "Easy Ed" Warren, an entrepreneur who rose from janitor to real estate promoter, joined with the paper's founder, James H. Anderson, as a co-owner in the paper, placing it on a "sound financial footing" despite the fact "that, on three occasions, he was forced to pawn a large diamond ring in order to meet the mounting debts of the paper." However, when Warren died suddenly, "the diamond ring that had saved the Amsterdam News on numerous occasions was still on his finger."

Sadie Warren took over her husband's share of the newspaper; she hired Jesse Shipp as its managing editor and T. Thomas Fortune to write editorials. After eighteen months, Mrs. Warren bought out James Anderson's estate and took control of the paper, with her new husband, William H. Davis, becoming president and general manager of the Amsterdam News Company, Inc.; with Mrs. Warren-Davis (as called herself) as treasurer, and Warren as vice president.

While involved with the day-to-day operations of the newspaper, Warren also continued with her millinery shop, which in September 1923 moved to 2293 Seventh Avenue, just below West 135th Street. Also during this time, she remarried, to Roy Francis Morse (1898-1971), who worked as a Deputy Collector for the U.S. Department of the Treasury. Morse was also known in his day as a champion athlete.

In 1914, he tied the indoor track record for the 100 yard dash—9 4/5 seconds; the next year he established a record for the 50 yard dash—5 1/4 seconds. Running for a number of amateur clubs, primarily the Salem Crescent Athletic Club of Manhattan, Morse won no less than eighteen major sprint matches, while at his peak. He also played professional baseball, and served in World War I as a member of the 369th Infantry Regiment (United States), the "Harlem Hellfighters." Staying in the Army National Guard of the United States, Morse was called to service during World War II, where he rose to be a Major in the U.S. Army Air Corps. He served as director of the ground school and secretary of the Tuskegee Army Air Field Advanced Flying School before going to McChord Field, in Pierce County, Washington, where he commanded "C Squadron".

Warren and her mother Sadie Warren-Davis lost control of the Amsterdam News in 1935, after a number of years of struggle. Issues with labor unions finally forced them to sell to Dr. C. B. Powell and Dr. P. M. H. Savory. Mrs. Warren-Davis died in 1946 and Warren remained in business at the Seventh Avenue address until about 1950.

Odessa Warren Grey Morse died on April 28, 1960, at the Pilgrim State Hospital on Long Island and was buried with the help of the Negro Actors Guild at the Long Island National Cemetery on May 4.
