= Charles-Louis Richard =

Charles-Louis Richard (April 1711 – 16 August 1794) was a Catholic theologian and publicist.

== Life ==
Richard was born at Blainville-sur-l'Eau, in Lorraine. His family though of noble descent, was poor, and he received his education in the schools of his native town. At the age of sixteen he entered the Dominican Order and, after his religious profession, was sent to study theology in Paris, where he received a Doctorate at the Sorbonne. He next applied himself to preaching and the defense of religion against d'Alembert, Voltaire, and their confederates. The outbreak of the French Revolution forced him to seek refuge in Mons, in Belgium. During the second invasion of that country by the French, in 1794, old age prevented him from fleeing, and, though he eluded his pursuers for some time, he was at last detected, tried by court martial, and shot.

== Publications ==
- Parallèle des Juifs qui ont crucifié Jésus-Christ, avec les Français qui ont exécuté leur roi ('Just as the Jews crucified Christ, the French have executed their King'; Mons, 1794)
- Bibliothèque sacrée, ou dictionnaire universelle des sciences ecclésiastiques (5 vols., Paris, 1760)
- Supplément (Paris, 1765), the last and enlarged edition being that of Paris, 1821–27, 29 vols.
- Analyses des conciles généraux et particuliers (5 vols., Paris, 1772–77).
