= Charles James Lewis =

British painter

Charles James Lewis (1830 – 28 January 1892) was an English painter in oils and watercolours.

== Life ==
Lewis was born in 1830 in Chelsea, London; his father, Charles Thomas Lewis, had Welsh ancestry. He first exhibited in 1853, when at the Royal Academy of Art he showed a portrait of "Miss Shelton". She was Mary Ann Matilda Hammond Shelton, whom he married in 1854.

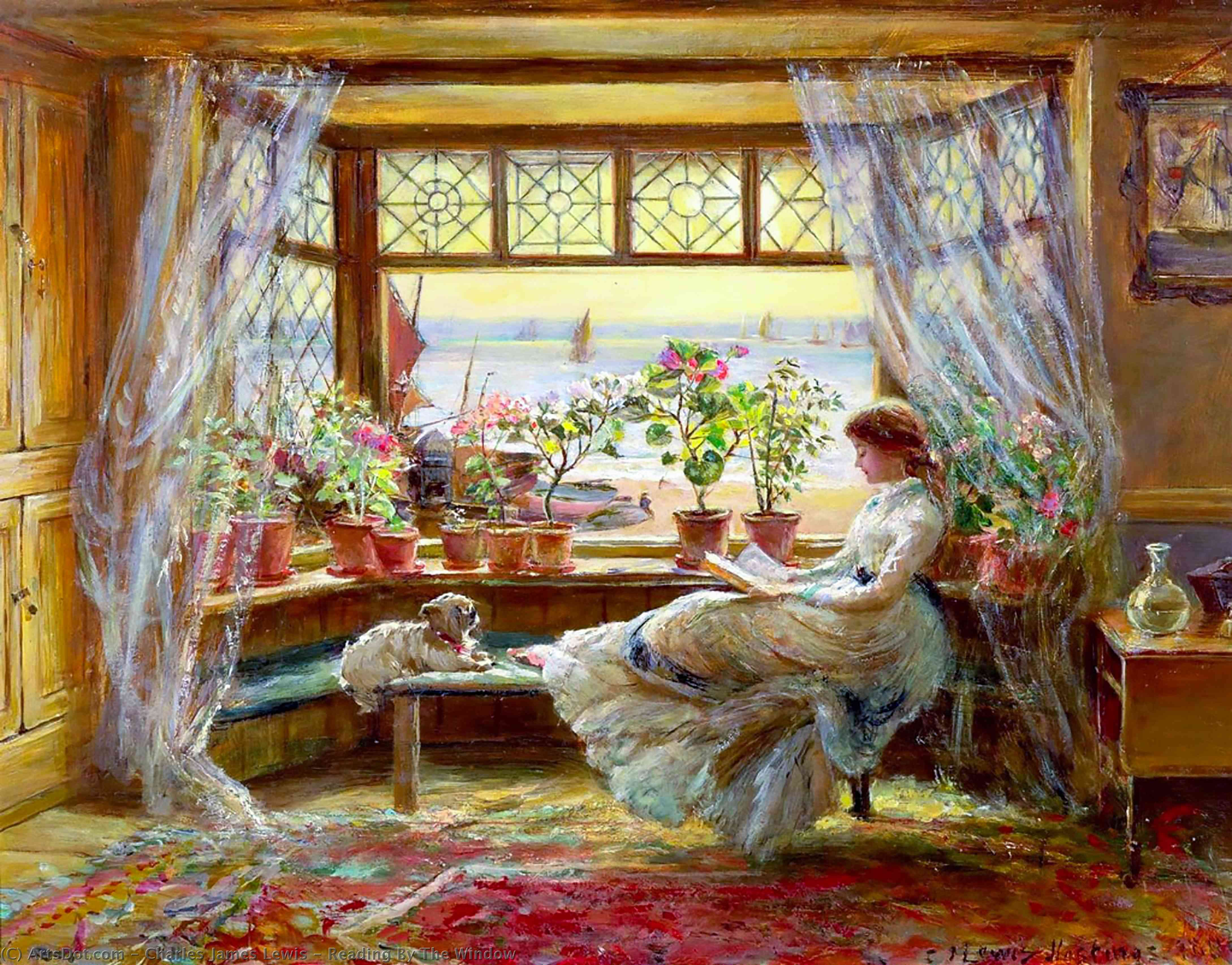
Reading by the window by Charles James Lewis

He became a painter of rustic genre scenes and of landscape, and his works were very popular. He was a prolific artist, and a frequent exhibitor at the Royal Academy (49 pictures shown up to 1890), at the Society of British Artists (43 pictures up to 1884), and at the British Institution (49 pictures up to 1867); his works were also shown at other London exhibitions. His pictures were usually signed "C. J. Lewis".

Lewis's more highly regarded work was done in watercolour; in 1882 he was elected a member of the Institute of Painters in Water-Colours. He also became a member of the Institute of Painters in Oil Colours.

From 1884 he lived in Cheyne Walk, Chelsea, where he died on 28 January 1892 after a long illness, survived by his wife and family. He was buried at Brookwood Cemetery, Woking.
