= West Grove, Pennsylvania =

Borough in Pennsylvania, US

- Borough
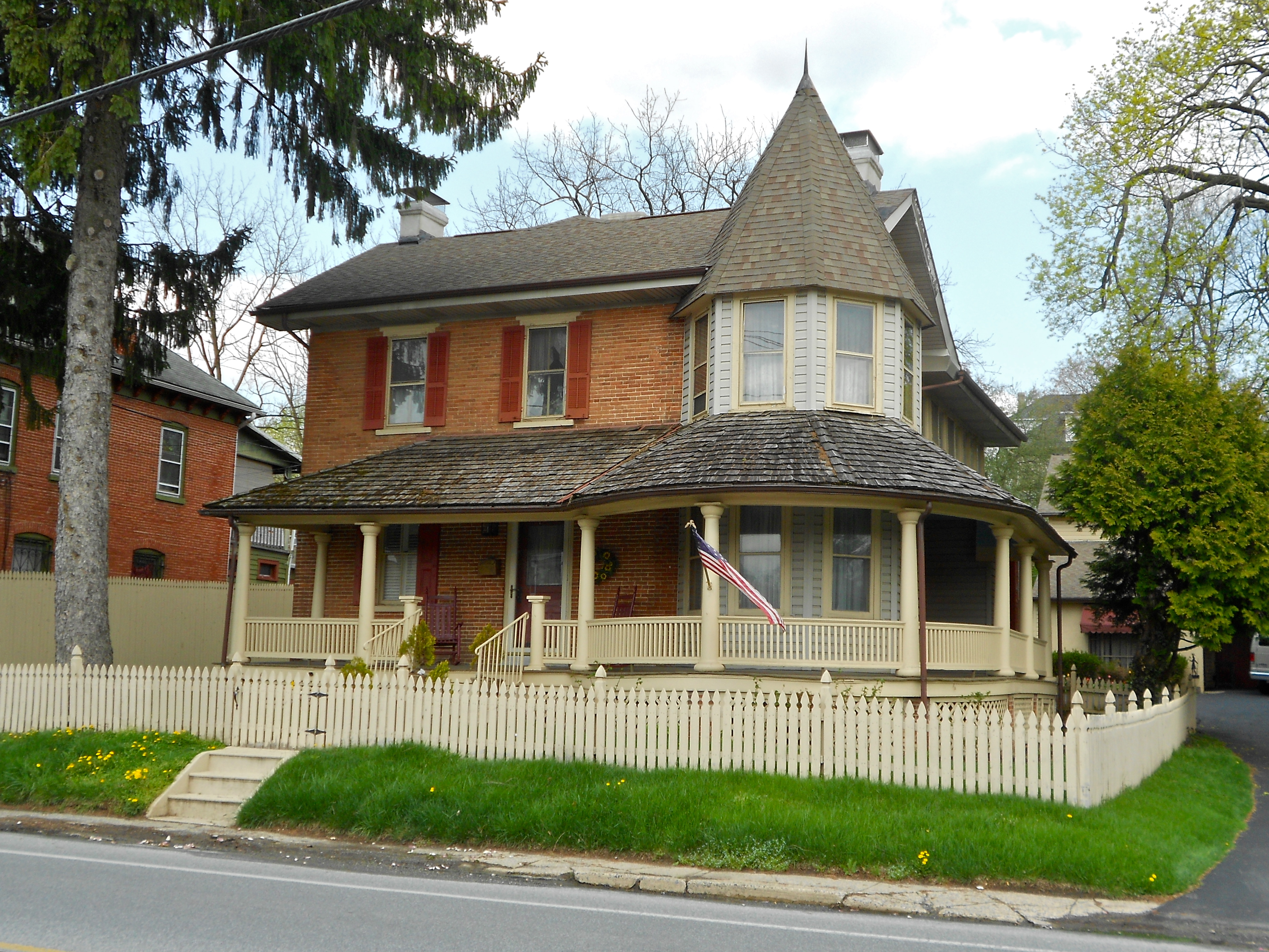
- House in West Grove
- Nickname: Home of the Roses
- Location in Chester County and the U.S. state of Pennsylvania

- Location in Pennsylvania Location in the United States
- Coordinates: 39°49′18″N 75°49′36″W
- Country: United States
- State: Pennsylvania
- County: Chester
- Incorporated: November 29, 1893

Government
  - Mayor: Stephen Black (R)

Area
  - Total: 0.65 sq mi (1.69 km^{2})
  - Land: 0.65 sq mi (1.69 km^{2})
  - Water: 0 sq mi (0.00 km^{2})
- Elevation: 430 ft (130 m)

Population (2020)
  - Total: 2,775 ▼
  - Estimate (2021): 2,767
  - Density: 4,361.6/sq mi (1,684.03/km^{2})
- Time zone: UTC-5 (EST)
  - Summer (DST): UTC-4 (EDT)
- ZIP Code: 19390
- Area codes: 610 and 484
- FIPS code: 42-83104
- Website: www.westgroveborough.org

West Grove is a borough in Chester County, Pennsylvania, United States. The population was 2,775 at the 2020 census.

== History ==
The village of West Grove derived its name from the Friends Meeting House on Harmony Road built in 1787 several miles west of the Friends Meeting House in the village of London Grove. West Grove was separated from London Grove Township and became an incorporated borough on November 29, 1893. However, the decree of incorporation was not recorded until January 9, 1894, to prevent confusing the tax accounts of London Grove Township and to eliminate the need for a special borough election.

The move for incorporation followed several years of significant growth in West Grove that began to develop with the coming of the Philadelphia and Baltimore Central Railroad in 1860. On March 28, 1885, the Daily Local News described West Grove as "one of the most flourishing villages in this county" and stated that "it contains some three flouring mills and the largest nursery for rose culture [see below] in the United States (Dinger & Conrad, Co.), a large casket factory (Paxson Comfort) and a large number of dwellings." In May 1885, the Chester County Democrat reported that thirty new homes were under construction in the village of West Grove.

The "Father of West Grove" was Joseph Pyle. Born in Penn Township in 1836, Joseph Pyle opened a general store in 1860 in the brick building that is currently empty. This building was constructed by Pyle and is believed to be the oldest brick structure in the center of town. Joseph Pyle constructed many of the commercial buildings along the present-day Exchange Place, including the Roselyn Theater Building in 1867 (torn down in 1980), the National Bank of West Grove building in 1883 and the K&P Building in 1885. Appointed postmaster of the borough by President Lincoln in 1864, Pyle served twenty-two years. Furthermore, Pyle introduced the manufacture of brick, planned and installed the first public water system, was President of the West Grove Improvement Company which financed the construction of the casket factory in 1885, served on Borough Council and was Burgess (Mayor) from 1900 to 1903.

The first election of borough officials was held in the West Grove Hotel on February 20, 1894. John P. Cheyney was elected the first burgess (mayor) in what amounted to a Democratic landslide. The Democrats won every office, including mayor, six school directors, two squires, constable, assessor and tax collector, two assistant assessors, three auditors, town clerk and high constable. The first council meeting was held March 6, 1894, in the Library Room on the second floor of the National Bank Building on Exchange Place. The current mayor of West Grove is Stephen B. Black, Republican, who has been in office since August 2000.

=== Home of the Roses ===
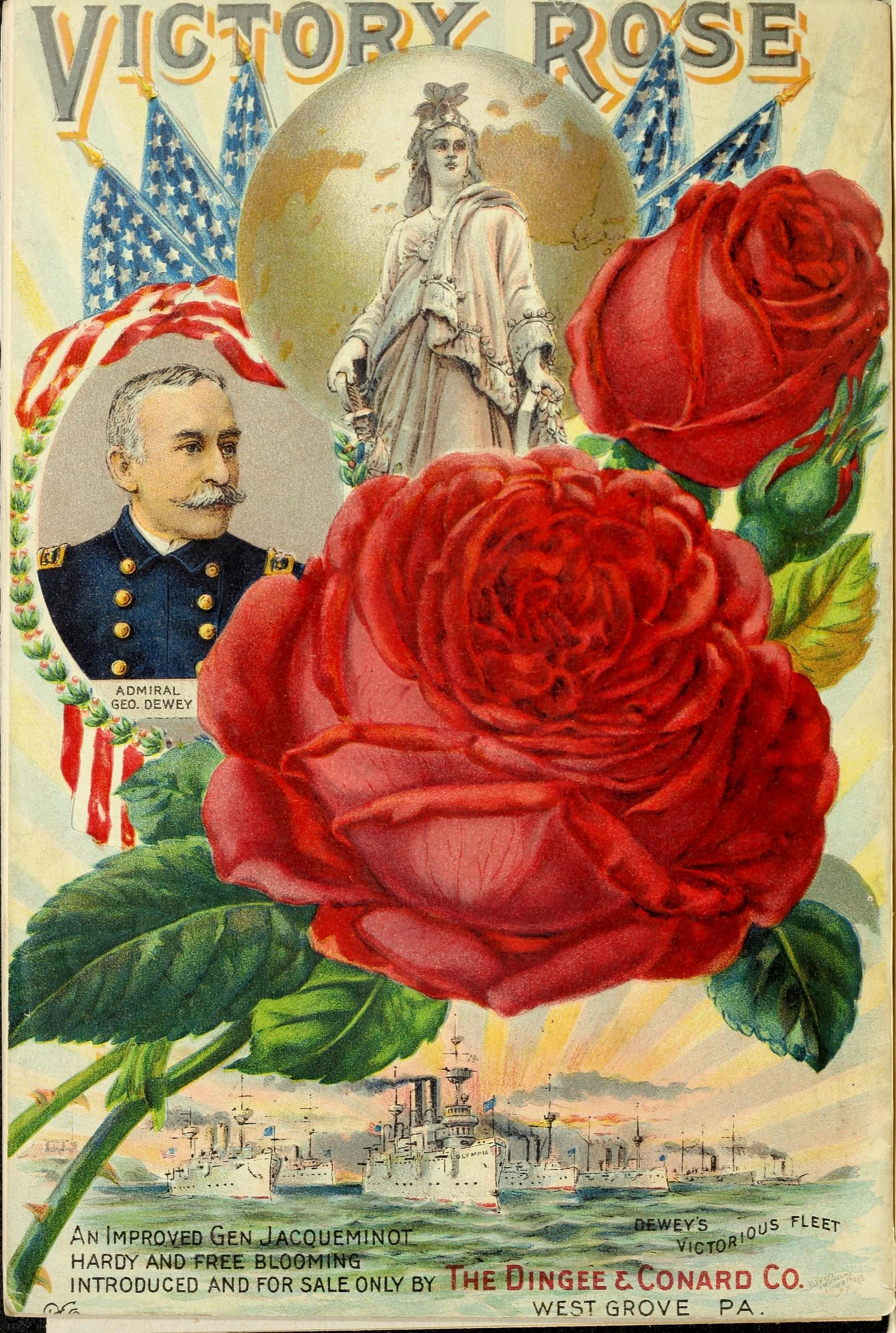
Our new guide to rose culture, Dingee & Conard Co. catalog, 1899

In 1868 Charles Dingee and Alfred Fellenberg Conard founded the Dingee & Conard Nursery, a commercial grower of fruit trees, roses and other nursery products. In the late 1880s the West Grove Post Office was the second largest in Chester County, mostly due to the volume of nursery products shipped by Dingee & Conard.

Located near the borough of West Grove is the Red Rose Inn, which was established in 1740. William Penn originally granted land for the inn subject to an annual rent payment of one red rose. The inn was subsequently renamed in honor of this event.

== Geography ==
West Grove is located at 39°49′18″N 75°49′36″W (39.821783, -75.826672).

According to the United States Census Bureau, the borough has a total area of 0.6 square miles (1.6 km^{2}), all land.

West Grove is on the boundary between hardiness zones 6b and 7a. The climate is hot-summer humid continental (Dfa.)

== Transportation ==
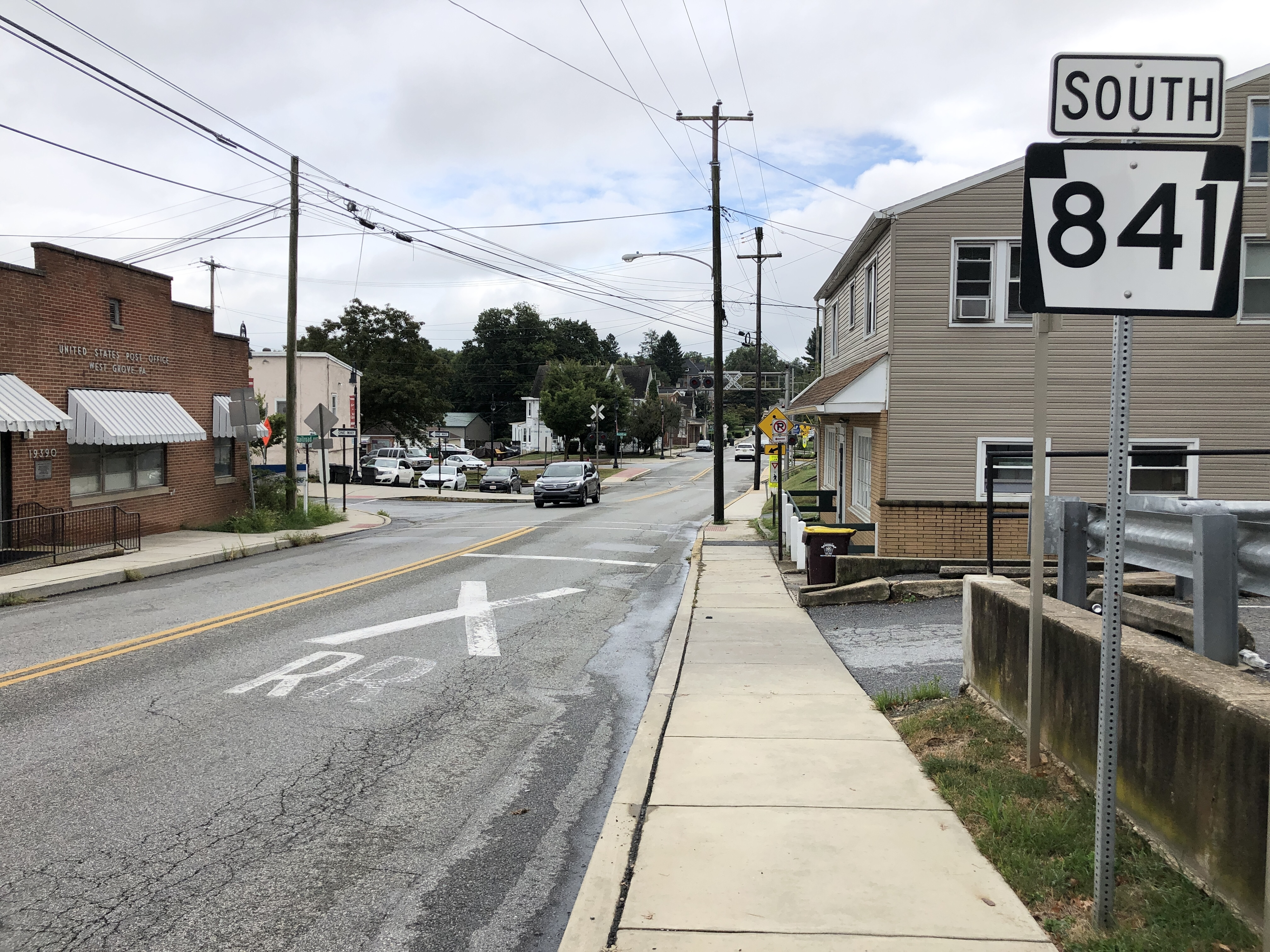
PA 841 southbound in West Grove

As of 2010, there were 8.97 miles (14.44 km) of public roads in West Grove, of which 1.55 miles (2.49 km) were maintained by Pennsylvania Department of Transportation (PennDOT) and 7.42 miles (11.94 km) were maintained by the borough.

Pennsylvania Route 841 is the only numbered highway directly serving West Grove. It follows a north-south alignment through the eastern part of the borough via Prospect Avenue, Evergreen Street and Chatham Road. U.S. Route 1 (which runs from Key West, Florida to Fort Kent, Maine) bypasses the borough to the north.

== Demographics ==
Historical population
Census	Pop.	Note	%±
1880	269		—
1900	929		—
1910	1,261		35.7%
1920	1,152		−8.6%
1930	1,375		19.4%
1940	1,357		−1.3%
1950	1,521		12.1%
1960	1,607		5.7%
1970	1,870		16.4%
1980	1,820		−2.7%
1990	2,128		16.9%
2000	2,652		24.6%
2010	2,854		7.6%
2020	2,770		−2.9%
2021 (est.)	2,767	▼	−0.1%

At the 2010 census, the borough was 56.7% non-Hispanic White, 6.0% Black or African American, 0.8% Native American, 0.8% Asian, and 2.5% were two or more races. 35.2% of the population were of Hispanic or Latino ancestry .

As of the census of 2000, there were 2,652 people, 864 households, and 679 families residing in the borough. The population density was 4,177.6 inhabitants per square mile (1,613.0/km^{2}). There were 889 housing units at an average density of 1,400.4 per square mile (540.7/km^{2}). The racial makeup of the borough was 78.73% White, 8.37% African American, 0.41% Native American, 9.77% from other races, and 2.71% from two or more races. Hispanic or Latino of any race were 17.01% of the population.

Of the borough's 864 households, 45.3% included children under the age of 18, 59.4% were married couples living together, 14.6% had a female householder with no husband present, and 21.4% were non-families. 16.7% of all households consisted of solo individuals, and 6.7% of those living alone were 65 years of age or older. The average household size was 3.05 and the average family size was 3.39.

The age distribution of borough residents comprised 31.1% under the age of 18, 9.1% from 18 to 24, 35.7% from 25 to 44, 15.9% from 45 to 64, and 8.1% who were 65 years of age or older. The median age was 32 years. For every 100 females there were 95.9 males. For every 100 females age 18 and over, there were 93.8 males.

The median income for a household in the borough was $56,875, and the median income for a family was $60,274. Males had a median income of $43,657 versus $30,144 for females. The per capita income for the borough was $19,967. About 4.7% of families and 8.3% of the population were below the poverty line, including 5.5% of those under age 18 and 11.1% of those age 65 or over.

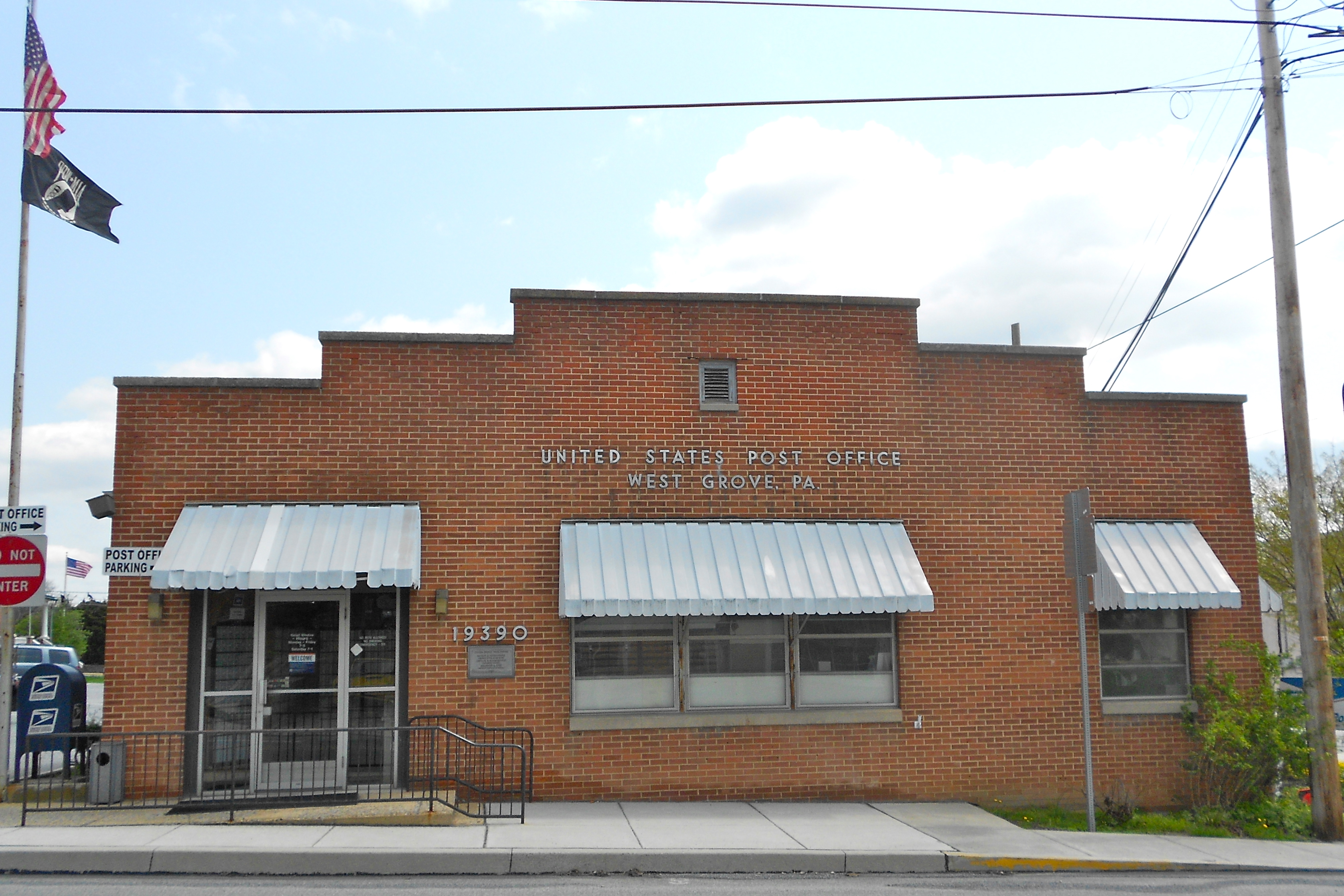
Post office

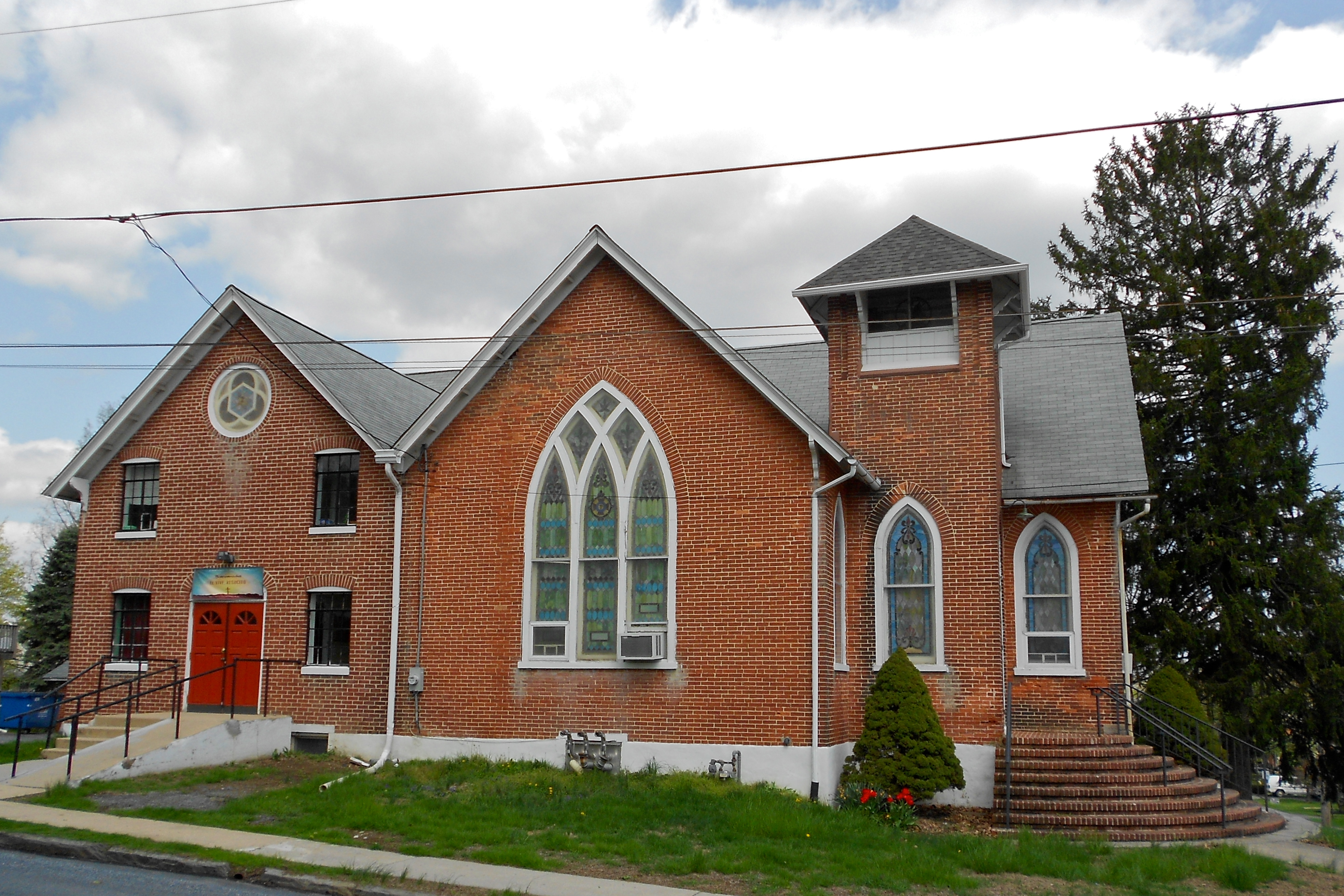
Methodist church

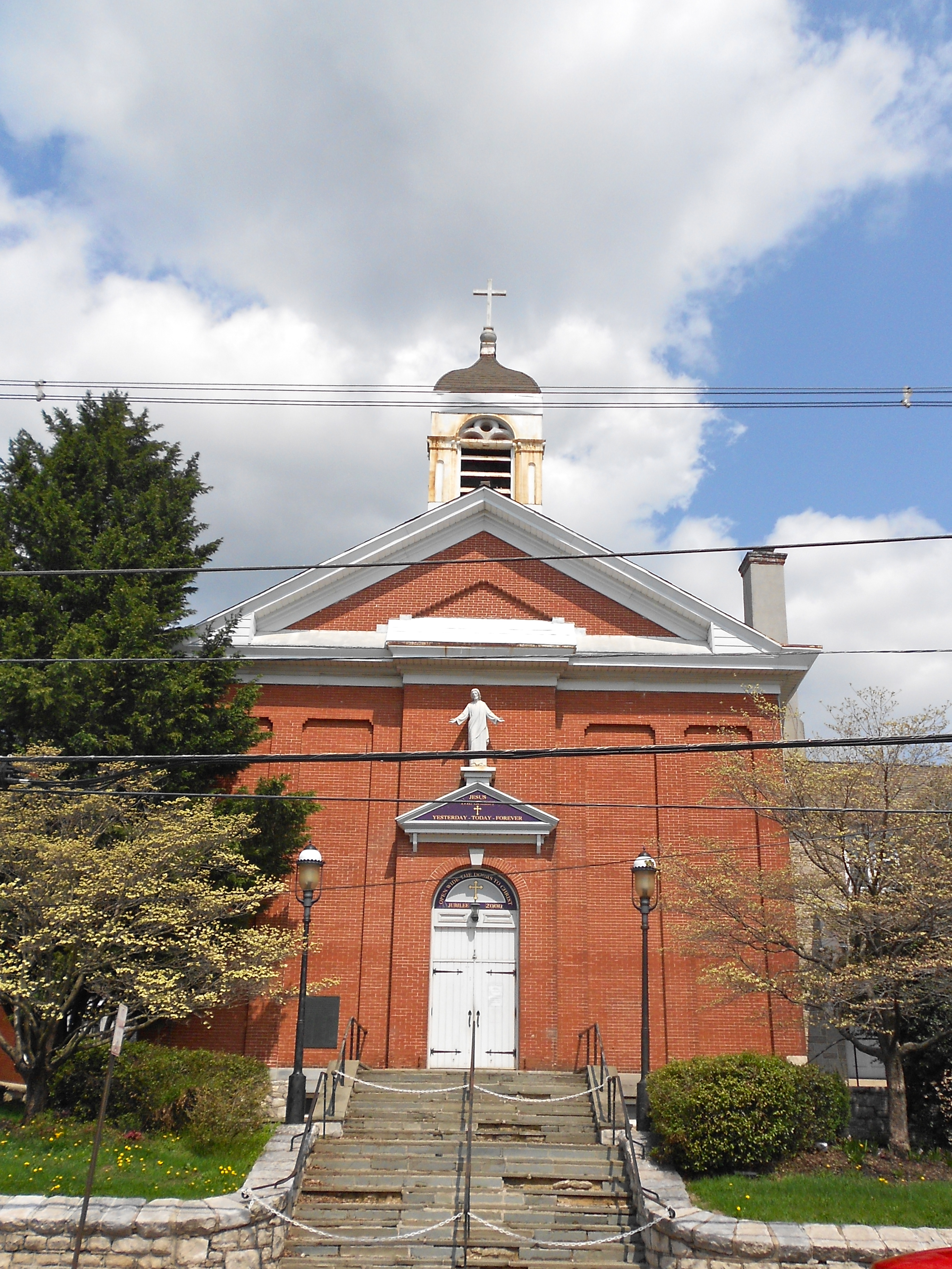
Catholic church

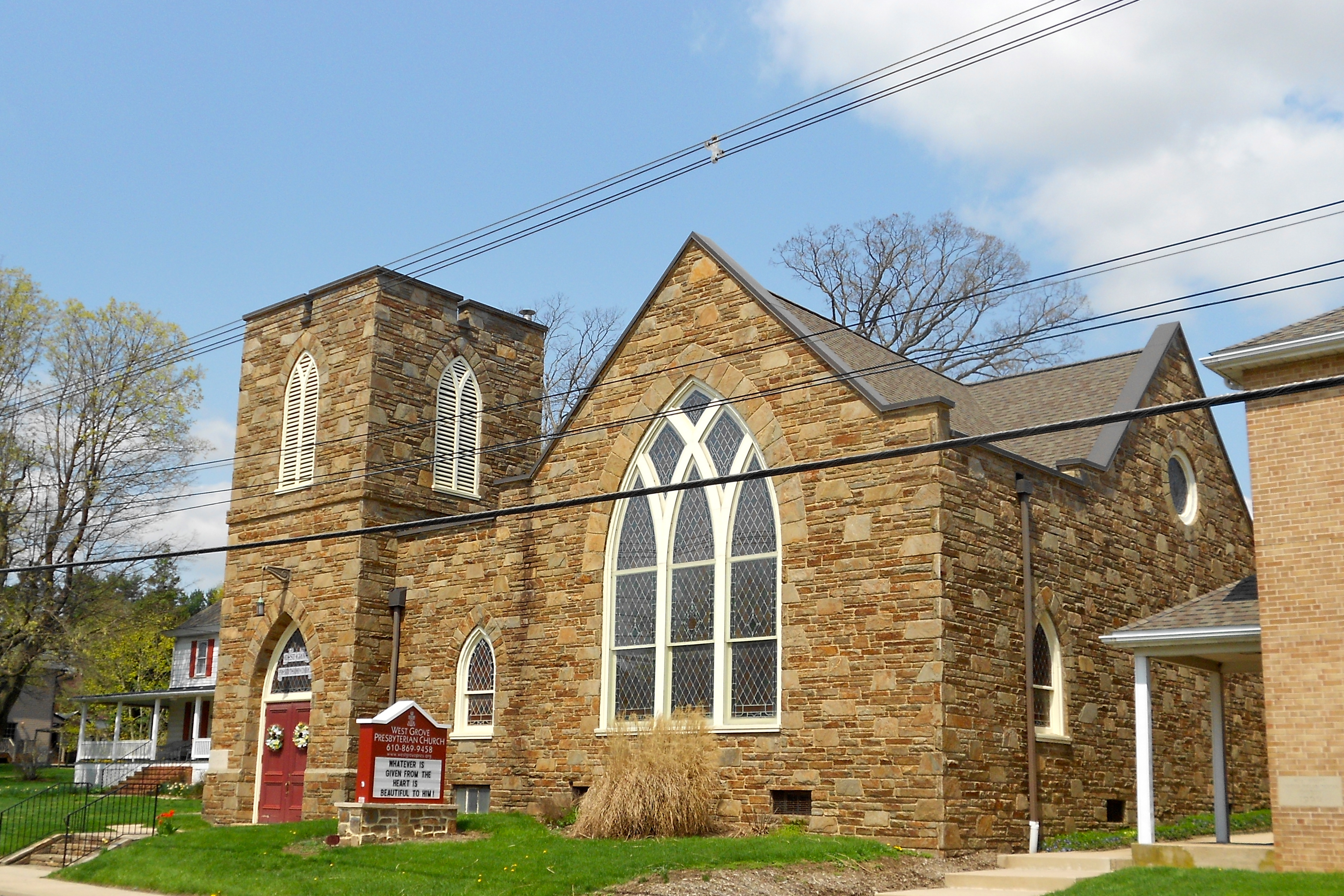
Presbyterian church

== Notable people ==
- Scott Holmes (born 1952) - actor

== See also ==
- Avon Grove High School.
- Dansko, a footwear company in West Grove.
- Pennsylvania Route 841, going through West Grove.
- Star Roses and Plants/Conard-Pyle, a horticultural products company in West Grove.
