= Charles Lewis (painter) =

English painter

Charles Lewis (1753 – 12 July 1795) was an English still life painter.

== Life ==
Lewis was born in Gloucester in 1753. He was apprenticed to a manufacturer in Birmingham, where he obtained some reputation for his skill in the decoration of japanned tea-trays. He turned to painting, and in 1772, at the exhibition of the Society of Artists in London, he exhibited nine pictures of fruit, dead game and other still life subjects.

He went to Dublin in 1776, but not meeting with success as a painter he took to the stage, obtaining from Michael Arne an engagement as a singer at the Crow Street Theatre, Dublin. Again he was not successful.

He visited Holland in 1781, and on his return settled in London, where he acquired great repute as a painter of still life. He exhibited three pictures at the Royal Academy of Arts in 1786. He exhibited for the last time in 1791, sending a fruit piece to the Royal Academy.

On the invitation of Lord Gardenstone Lewis went to Edinburgh, but on the death of his patron his fortunes languished, and he died there on 12 July 1795.

Lewis married a daughter of the violinist Thomas Pinto.
