= Charles L. Lewis (American football) =

American football coach

Coaching career (HC unless noted)
- 1915–1916: Tuskegee

Head coaching record
- Overall: 5–4–2

Charles L. Lewis was the fifth head football coach at Tuskegee University in Tuskegee, Alabama and he held that position for two seasons, from 1915 until 1916. His coaching record at Tuskegee was 5–4–2.
