= Charles B. Lewis (athlete) =

American athlete

Personal information
- Born: 1937 (age 88–89) Avondale, Pennsylvania, U.S.

Sport
- Country: United States
- Sport: Track and field
- Event(s): 400m, 100m, Long jump
- College team: Winston-Salem State University
- League: PIAA, Ches-Mont League

Charles B. Lewis (born 1937) is an American former track and field athlete who competed in the 400 m, 100 m and broad jump.

== Life ==
Lewis was raised in Avondale, Pennsylvania, where he was a standout athlete at Avon Grove High School in baseball, basketball, soccer and especially track and field. During his sophomore year in 1954, Lewis won the Pennsylvania Interscholastic Athletic Association (PIAA) 400 m run and finished second in the 100-yard dash. In his junior year he was victorious in the PIAA 100-yard dash and second in the 400 m run. Lewis and his AAU teammates set a national record in the 4 x 100 relay his junior year. Equally adept in basketball Lewis was the league's leading scorer his senior year averaging 19 points per game. Lewis was awarded an athletic scholarship to Winston-Salem State Teacher's College in North Carolina, where he won the Carolina AAU 400 m run and was ranked one of the top freshmen in the United States. Lewis and his teammates placed second in the freshman mile relay at the Penn Relays and won the Division II 4 x 440 as sophomores.

Lewis qualified for the 1960 United States Olympic Trials but was unable to compete because of his Army service. He later accepted a teaching position in the Kennett Consolidated School District (1961) and became assistant track and field coach, later becoming head coach (1967) and head coach of cross country (1969). He taught in the Kennett District from 1961 to 1997.

He coached the Kennett High School boys' track and field teams for 29 years, boys' and girls' cross country for 23 years, and girls track and field for 10 years, and coached boys' and girls' basketball for 15 years at the middle school. He later served as assistant track coach at Unionville High School (2003–2018).

== Meet record ==
Year	Meet	Event	Result
1954	PIAA State Championships	400m	1st
1954	PIAA State Championships	100m	2nd
1955	PIAA State Championships	400m	2nd
1955	PIAA State Championships	100m	1st
1955	PIAA State Championships	4x100m	1st
1958	Carolina AAU Championship	400m	1st
1958	Division II Penn Relays	4x100m	1st

== Legacy ==
Lewis was a successful coach and an influential mentor to hundreds of athletes who competed at the league, district, and state levels. One of his athletes was Don Webster.

In 2023, Lewis was inducted into the Chester County Sports Hall of Fame.
