= Charles B. Lewis (American football) =

American football coach and educator

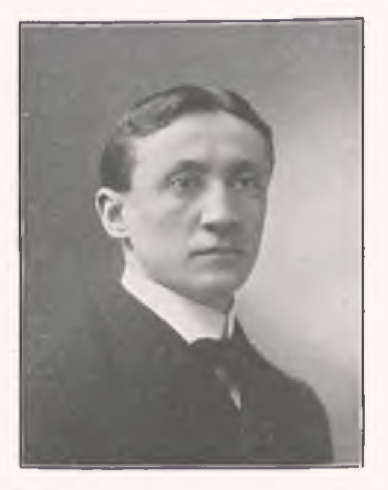
- Lewis pictured in the Kaldron 1903, Allegheny yearbook

Biographical details
- Education: Amherst College (1906)

Coaching career (HC unless noted)
- 1906: Allegheny

Head coaching record
- Overall: 2–7

Charles B. Lewis was an American college football coach and educator. He served as the head football coach at Allegheny College in Meadville, Pennsylvania for one season, in 1906 season, compiling a record of 2–7.

Lewis was a physical training instructor at Pennsylvania Military College (now known as Widener University) and West Chester Normal School (now known as West Chester University). In the summer of 1902, he taught fencing and gymnastics at Harvard University. That fall, Lewis went to Allegheny as physical director.

== Head coaching record ==
Year	Team	Overall	Conference	Standing	Bowl/playoffs
Allegheny Gators (Independent) (1906)
1906	Allegheny	2–7			
Allegheny:		2–7			
Total:		2–7			
