= Charles Bertrand Lewis =

American journalist and humorist

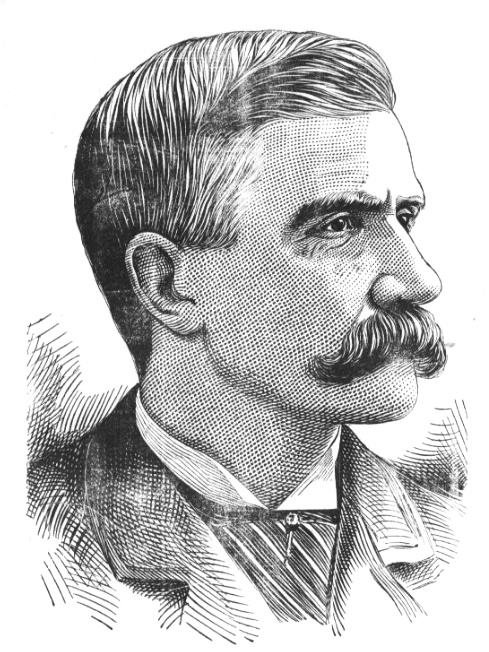
- Born: February 15, 1842; Liverpool, Medina County, Ohio
- Died: August 21, 1924 (aged 82); Brooklyn, New York
- Writing career
- Pen name: M. Quad

Charles Bertrand Lewis (February 15, 1842 – August 21, 1924), better known by the pen name M. Quad, was an American journalist and humorist.

Lewis was born at Liverpool, Medina County, Ohio, and attended the Michigan State Agricultural College. He was a volunteer soldier in the northern army during the Civil War.

He joined the staff of the Detroit Free Press in 1869, and became known as a writer of sketches under the pen-name of M. Quad. His accounts of the proceedings of a supposed society of colored people, to which he gave the name of Brother Gardner's Lime-Kiln Club, were very popular. His published works include: Sawed-Off Sketches (1884), Field, Fort and Fleet (1885), Under Fire (1886), and The Lime-Kiln Club (1887).

Charles Bertrand Lewis died at his home in Brooklyn on August 21, 1924.
