= The Rhoad's Meetinghouse =

Coordinates: 40.1795°N 75.564°W

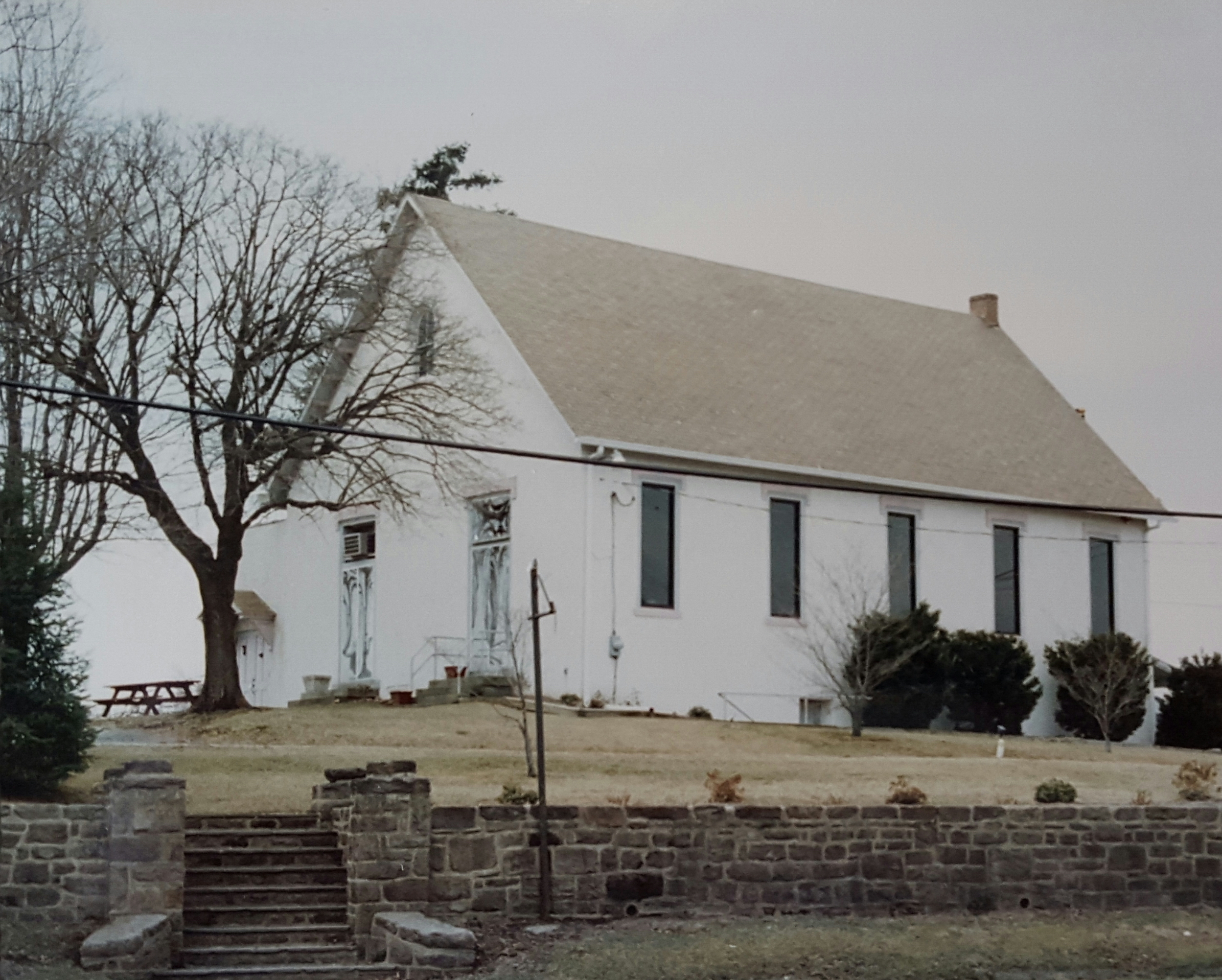
The Rhoad's Meetinghouse 1889 building, formerly the Vincent Mennonite Church

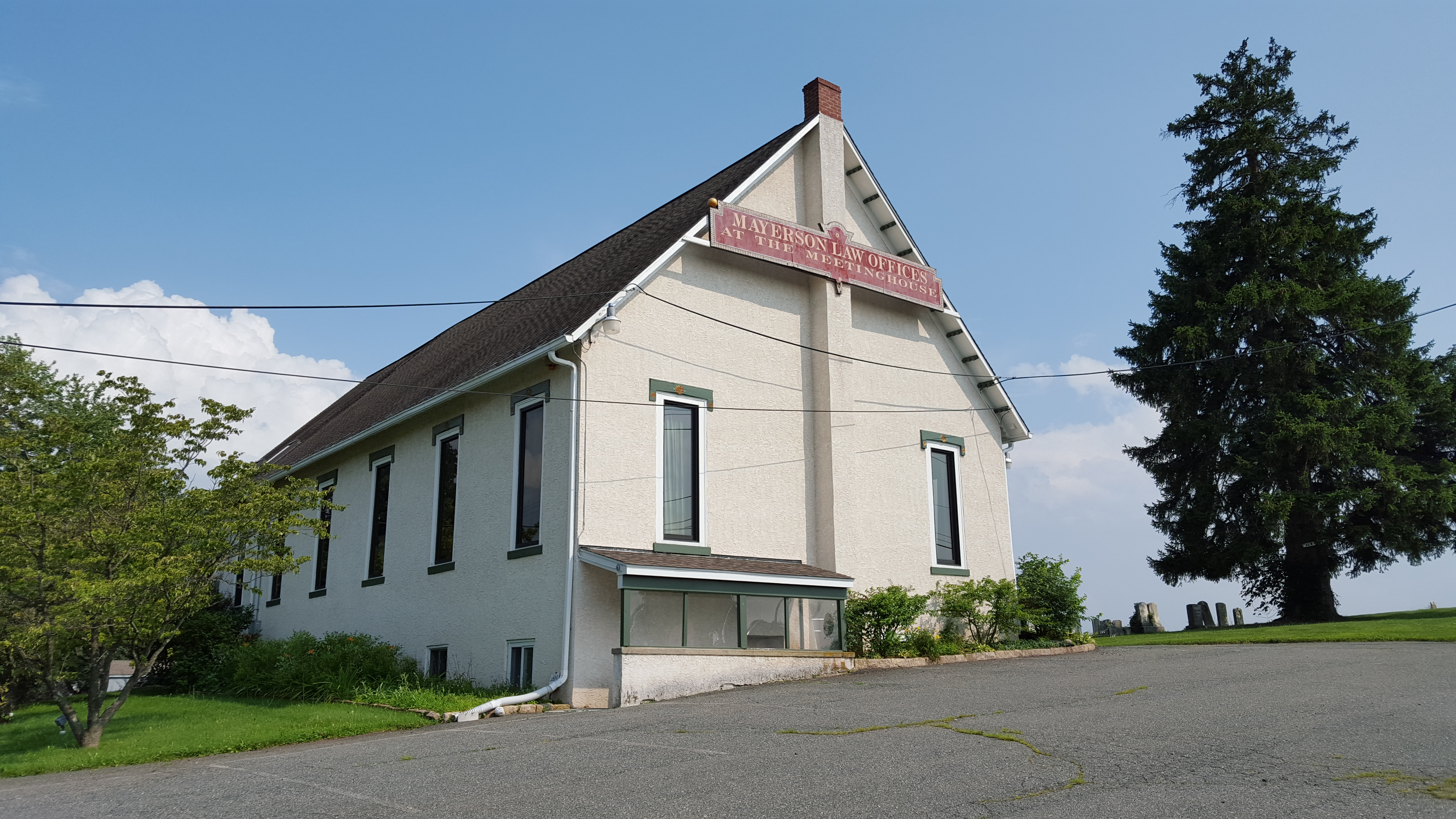
The Rhoad's Meetinghouse today

The Rhoad's Meetinghouse, formerly the home of the Vincent Mennonite Church, is located in East Vincent Township, Chester County, Pennsylvania. The historic church building housed a law firm for a number of years and is now a dog grooming salon.

== History ==
=== Early: 1719-1750 ===
The site was first settled by John Roth (also known as Johannas Rhoads) in 1719. There he built a house for his family. Remnants of the original building still exist in the inscribed stonework of the present building, which is inscribed with the date “1735".

Based on the inscribed date, 1735 is considered the date of the founding of the Vincent Mennonite Congregation. The first use of the original building as a community meetinghouse dates to 1750. This is recorded by Frederick Sheeder in his 1845 Sketch of Vincent Township, stating: "the meeting house that has allways whent by the name of Rohd’s this meeting house was built in 1750 [for use by] the old Germans nearly all in the neighborhood."

=== Middle: 1798-1974 ===
The transfer of the deed from the Rhoad family to the Vincent Mennonite Congregation was not made until 12 June 1798. John Rhoad sold the property and grounds to Henry Acker, Sr., and Jacob Finkbiner, who acted on behalf of the Vincent Mennonite Church, the deed stating: “a lot or piece of land situated in the said Township of Vincent, bounded by lands of John Rhoades, containing two acres more or less…for the sum of five shillings.”

The pre-Revolutionary building was razed in 1889, and was replaced the same year by the current building, a stone-and-stucco church re-built just east of the original building.

The Mennonite meetinghouse served as a place of worship and sanctuary, and as a school for the education of Christian youths for the Vincent Mennonite Congregation. They met in the original building from 1750 until 1889, and in the current building from 1889 until 1974, a total of 224 years. In 1969, the congregation began planning to build a new church.

In 1974, the new church was built nearby on Seven Stars Road in East Vincent Township where the congregation worships currently.

=== Late: 1974-Today ===
The 1889, building is located on a rise at the intersection of two historic roads: Mennonite Church Road and Schuylkill Road (PA Route 724).

Since June 1974, the building has served as a law office. The building retains the original large internal open space, 33 ft x 53 ft, —free from any visible support beams—as well as the original tin roof and ceiling, and the original doors and entrance.

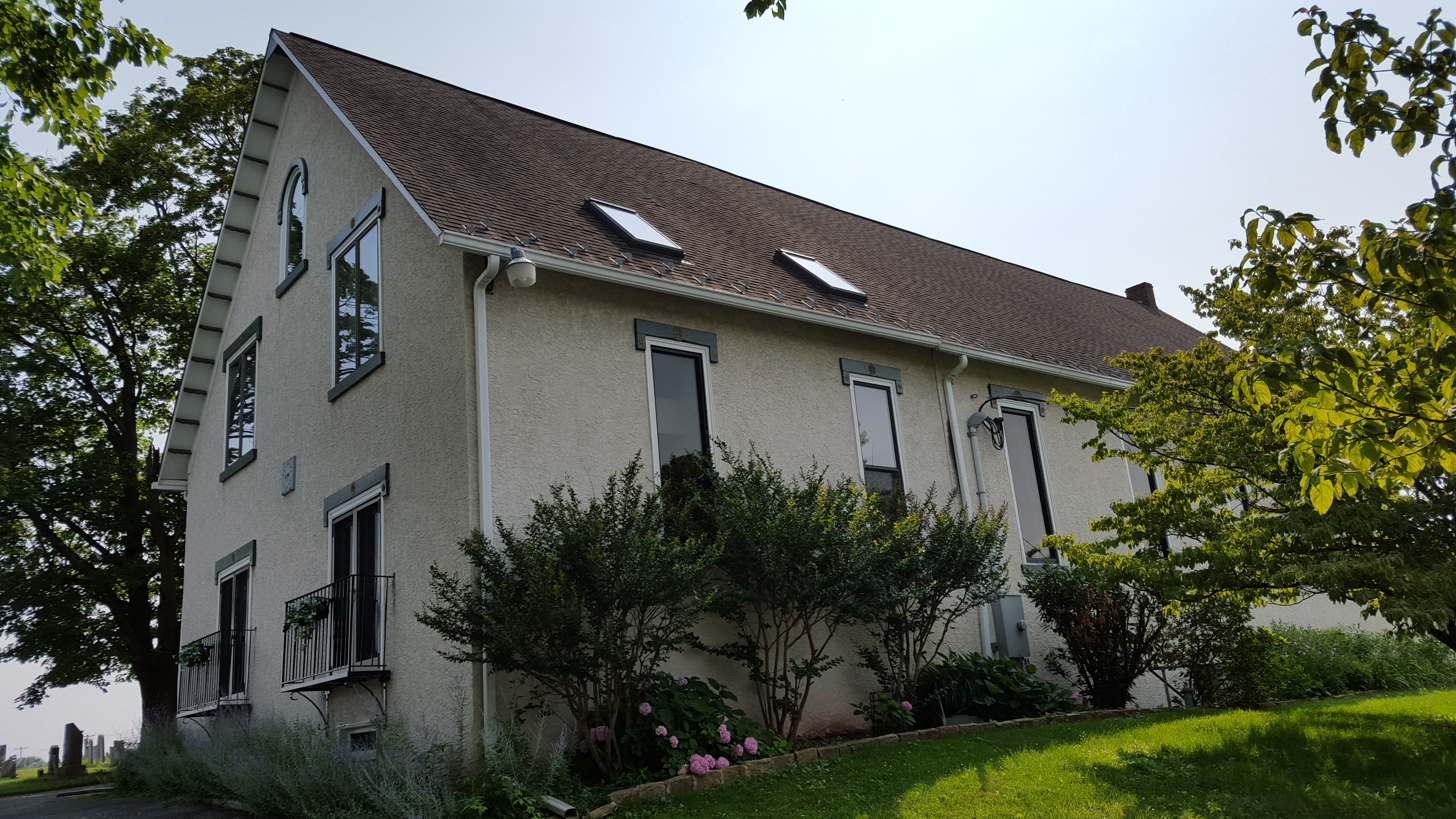
The Meetinghouse after the 2002 addition

=== Cemetery ===
The Vincent Mennonite Church continues its ownership of the serene adjoining cemetery, known as Rhoad’s (or Rohd’s, Rhoads, or Rhoades) Burying Grounds. The multi-denominational cemetery contains some grave markers dating to 1759 and 1760.

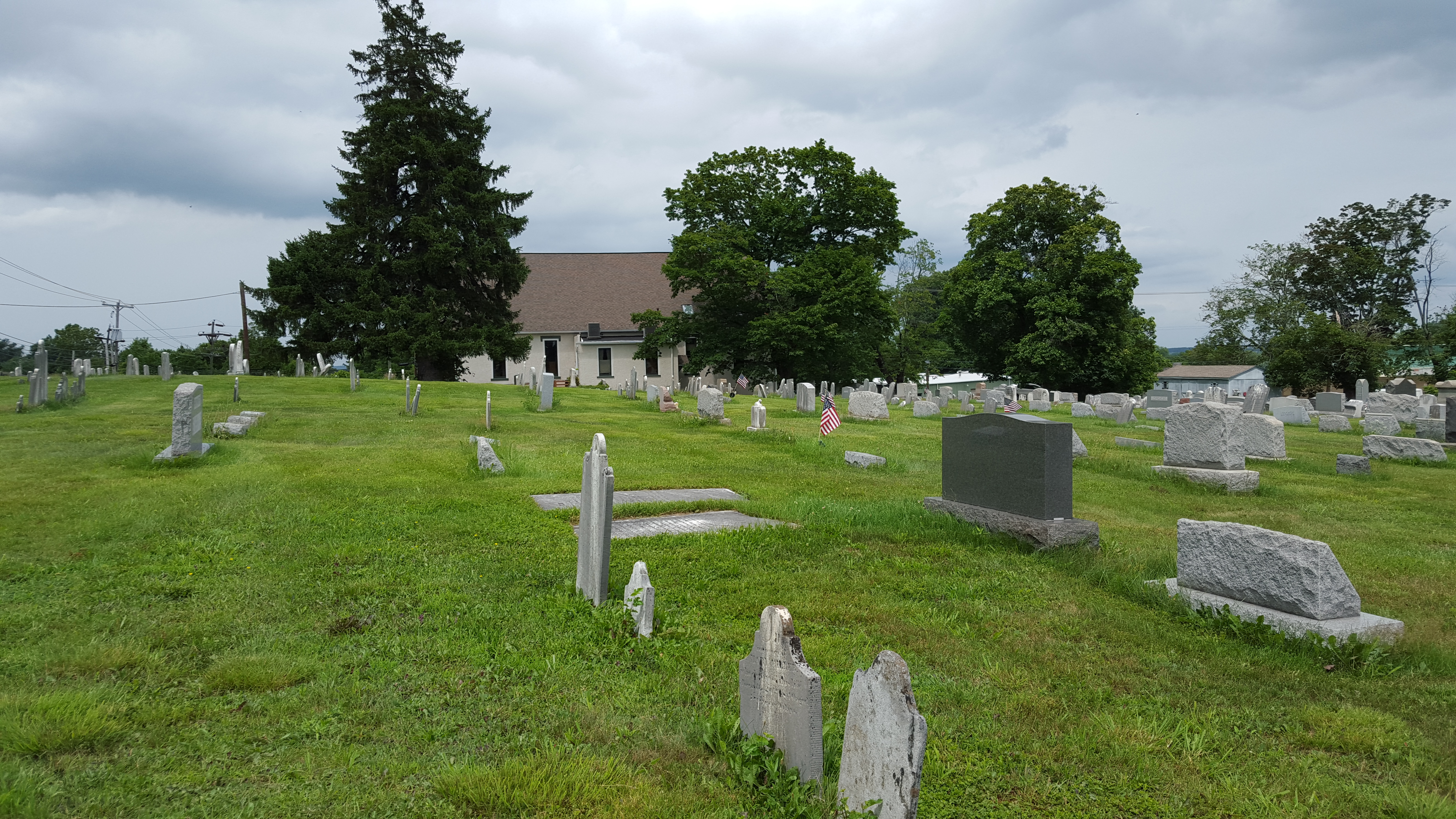
The Rhoad's Burying Ground
