= Vincent Mennonite Church =

Mennonite congregation in Chester County, Pennsylvania, USA

Coordinates: 40.167467°N 75.581025°W

The Vincent Mennonite Church is one of the oldest Mennonite congregations in Chester County, Pennsylvania, established in 1750 by John Roth (also known as Johannas Rhoad).

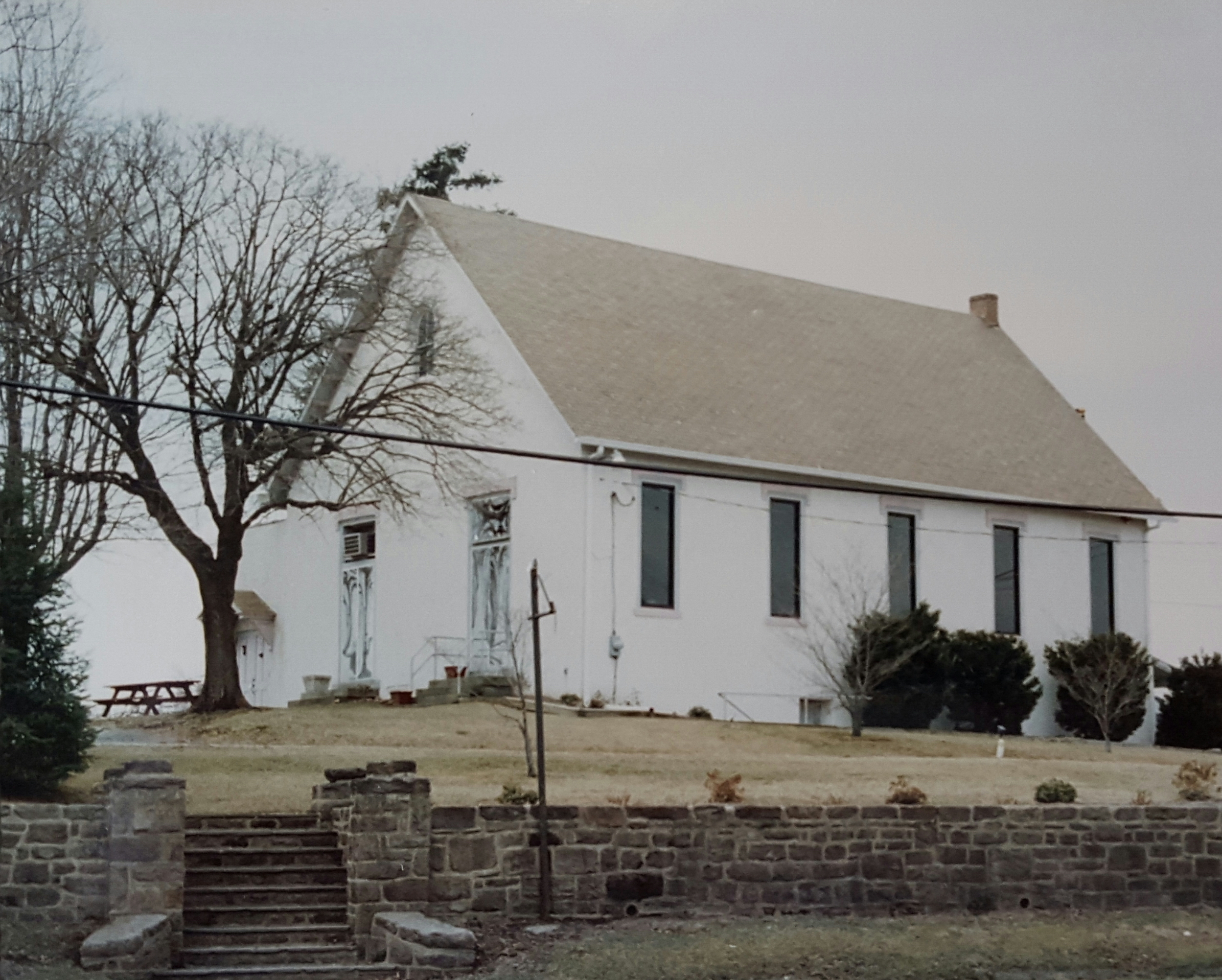
The Rhoad's Meetinghouse, as when occupied by the Vincent Mennonite Church.

== History ==
The Vincent Mennonites emigrated to Pennsylvania from Germany circa 1735, when a meeting house for the congregation was first built. This date is assumed based on the date inscribed in the original stone work of the building.

The original building was razed in 1889, and then was rebuilt the same year, with portions of the original building remaining in the stone work. The 1889 building still stands at the intersection of Pennsylvania Route 724 and Mennonite Church Road in East Vincent, Chester County, Pennsylvania and is known locally as The Rhoad's Meetinghouse, or simply The Meetinghouse.

The Vincent Mennonite congregation began planning to build a new church in 1969. The new church, located at 39 Seven Stars Rd, Spring City, Pennsylvania, began construction in 1973, and then was occupied in 1974. The congregation continues to meet in the new building today.

The church offers amenities to the community, including a "Little Lending Library," a basketball court and a playground. Their pavilion, located in a grove of mature hickory trees, is available to rent for special events and for the casual user to drop in for free at their leisure. They have large open spaces which are used by local soccer clubs and others.

== Cemetery ==
The Vincent Mennonite Church retains ownership of the cemetery at their original building. Locally, the cemetery is known as Rhoad's Burying Ground. Many of the grave markers date as far back as 1759. Given the time period, the grounds may also have been used for the burials of former owner John Roth, who died in 1738, and his wife.

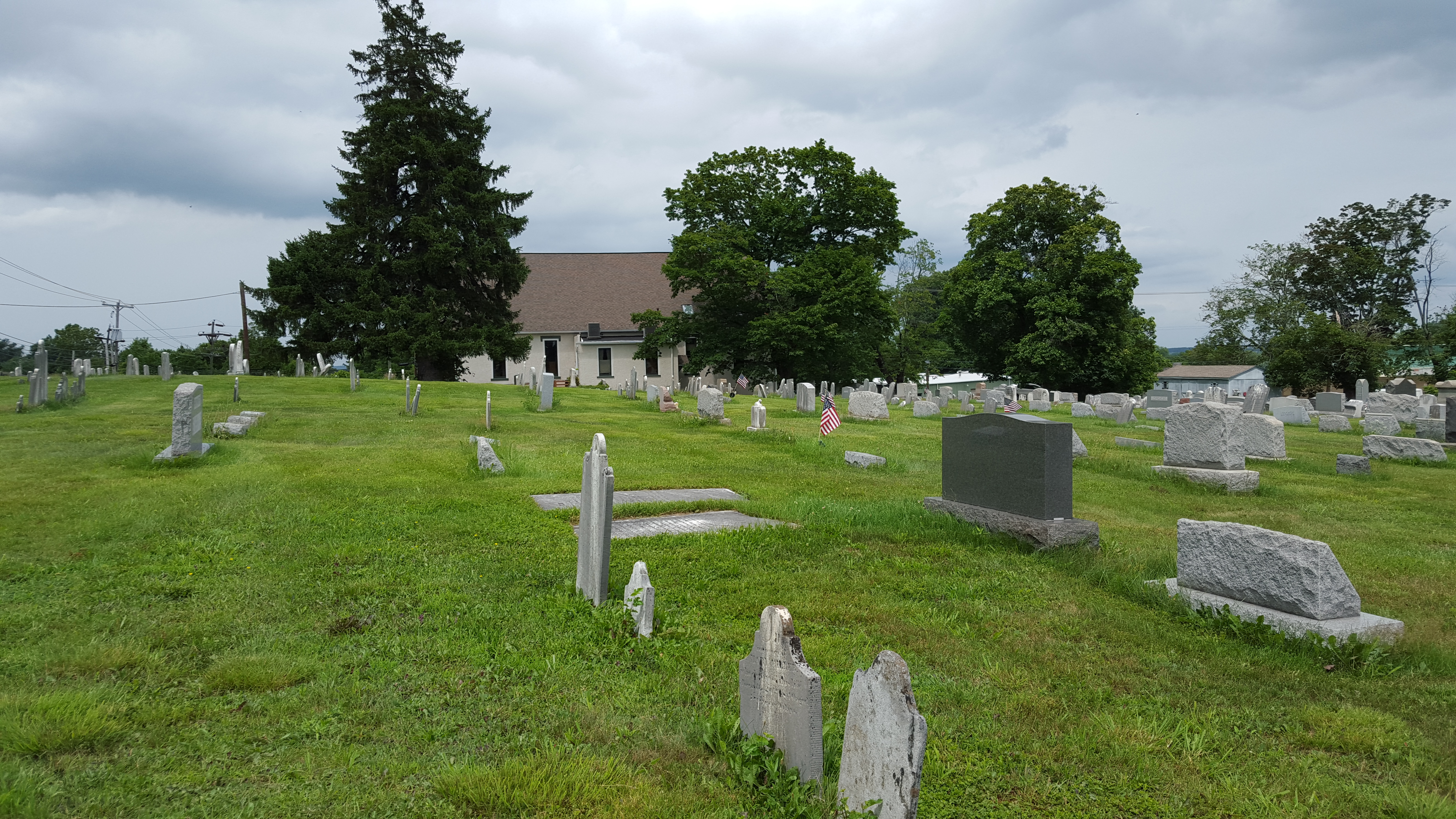
The Rhoad's Burying Ground, next to The Rhoad's Meetinghouse.
