= Hays House =

Hays House or Hayes House may refer to:

Places in the United States named Hays House (without an E) (by state):

- Brady Hays Homestead, Denmark, Arkansas, listed on the National Register of Historic Places (NRHP) in White County
- Ward-Hays House, Little Rock, Arkansas, NRHP-listed
- Samuel Hays House, Boise, Idaho, NRHP-listed in Ada County
- E.R. Hays House, Knoxville, Iowa, NRHP-listed in Marion County
- Seth Hays House, Council Grove, Kansas, listed on the NRHP in Morris County
- James Hays House, Hays, Kentucky, listed on the NRHP in Warren County
- Hays House (Bel Air, Maryland), NRHP-listed
- Joseph C. Hays House, Sharpsburg, Maryland, NRHP-listed
- Hays-Heighe House, Bel Air, Maryland, NRHP-listed
- Hays House (Lorman, Mississippi), NRHP-listed
- Daniel Boone Hays House, Defiance Missouri, listed on the NRHP in St. Charles County
- George Hays House, Jerusalem, New York, NRHP-listed
- John R. Hays House, Walden, New York, NRHP-listed
- Hays-Kiser House, Antioch, Tennessee, listed on the NRHP in Davidson County
- Hays-Pitzer House, Martinsburg, West Virginia, listed on the NRHP in Berkeley County
- Hays-Gerrard House, Gerrardstown, West Virginia, listed on the NRHP in Berkeley County

Places in the United States named Hayes House (with an E) (by state):

- Hayes Mansion, San Jose, California, NRHP-listed
- Samuel Hayes II House, Granby, Connecticut, listed on the NRHP in Hartford County, Connecticut
- Dr. David Brandon House, Thomasville, Georgia, also known as Hayes House, NRHP-listed in Thomas County
- Jarrett-Hayes House, Toccoa, Georgia, listed on the NRHP in Stephens County
- William B. Hayes House, Des Moines, Iowa, listed on the NRHP in Park County
- Samuel T. Hayes House, Lexington, Kentucky, listed on the NRHP in Fayette County
- Hayes Voting House No. 16, Morehead, Kentucky, listed on the NRHP in Rowan County
- Needham-Hayes House, Le Sueur, Minnesota, listed on the NRHP in Le Sueur County
- Richard Hayes House, Rochester, New Hampshire, listed on the NRHP in Strafford County
- Hayes House (Altamont, New York), NRHP-listed
- Hayes-Byrum Store and House, Charlotte, North Carolina, listed on the NRHP in Mecklenburg County
- Hayes Plantation, Edenton, North Carolina, NRHP-listed
- Rutherford B. Hayes House, Fremont, Ohio, a U.S. National Historic Landmark
- Jacob Hayes House, Newlin Twp., Pennsylvania, listed on the NRHP in southern Chester County
- Hayes Mill House, Newlin Twp., Pennsylvania, listed on the NRHP in southern Chester County
- Hayes Homestead, Newlin Twp., Pennsylvania, listed on the NRHP in southern Chester County
- John Hayes Farmstead, Latta, South Carolina, listed on the NRHP in Dillon County

Places in Canada named Hays House:

- Hays House, Montreal, Quebec (destroyed in 1852)

== See also ==
- Hay House (disambiguation)
