= Jacob Hayes House =

Historic house in Pennsylvania, United States

- U.S. National Register of Historic Places
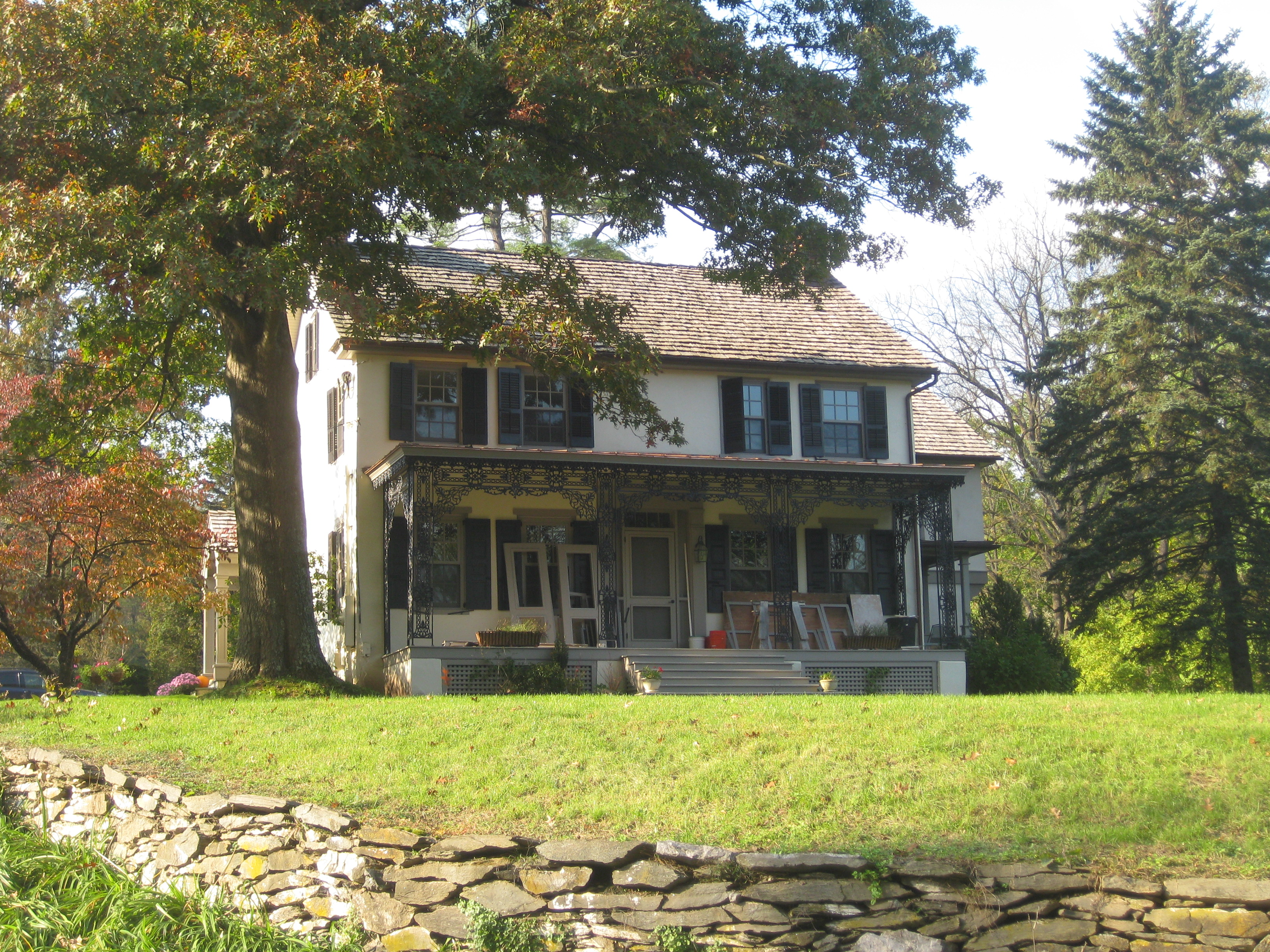
- Jacob Hayes House, October 2011

- Location within Pennsylvania Location within the United States
- Location: Rt. 162, Newlin Township, Pennsylvania
- Coordinates: 39°56′9″N 75°44′7″W
- Area: 4.5 acres (1.8 ha)
- Built: 1841
- Built by: Hayes, Jacob
- Architectural style: Greek Revival, Federal
- MPS: West Branch Brandywine Creek MRA
- NRHP reference No.: 85002356
- Added to NRHP: September 16, 1985

The Jacob Hayes House is an historic home that is located in Newlin Township, Chester County, Pennsylvania near the West Branch of Brandywine Creek.

It was added to the National Register of Historic Places in 1985. Both the homestead and the mill house are also listed on the National Register.

== History and architectural features ==
The house was built in 1841, and is a two-story, stuccoed, stone dwelling which was designed in a Federal / Greek Revival style. It features a full-width front porch with ornate iron supports and scrollwork.

The great-uncle of Jacob Hayes first moved to Newlin Township in 1771, and his grandfather, Mordecai Hayes arrived in 1774.

The house is located next door to the Hayes Homestead, which was built by his great-uncle. Situated nearby is the Hayes Mill House, where both Mordecai and Jacob used to mill whetstones.
