= Embreeville, Pennsylvania =

Unincorporated community in Pennsylvania, US

- Unincorporated community
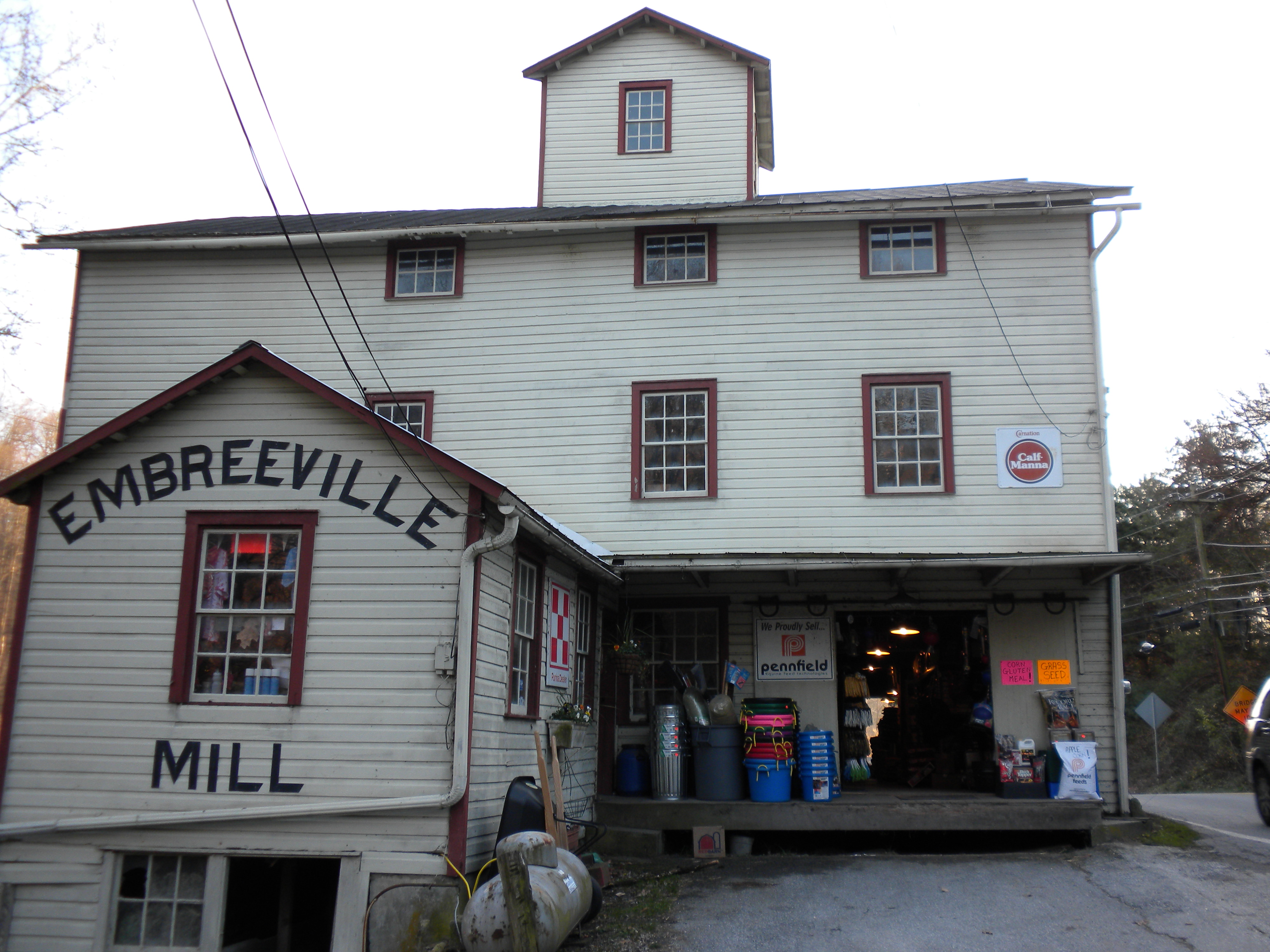

- Location within the U.S. state of Pennsylvania Embreeville (the United States)
- Coordinates: 39°55′44″N 75°43′52″W
- Country: United States
- State: Pennsylvania
- County: Chester
- Township: Newlin
- Time zone: UTC-5 (Eastern (EST))
  - Summer (DST): UTC-4 (EDT)
- ZIP codes: 19320

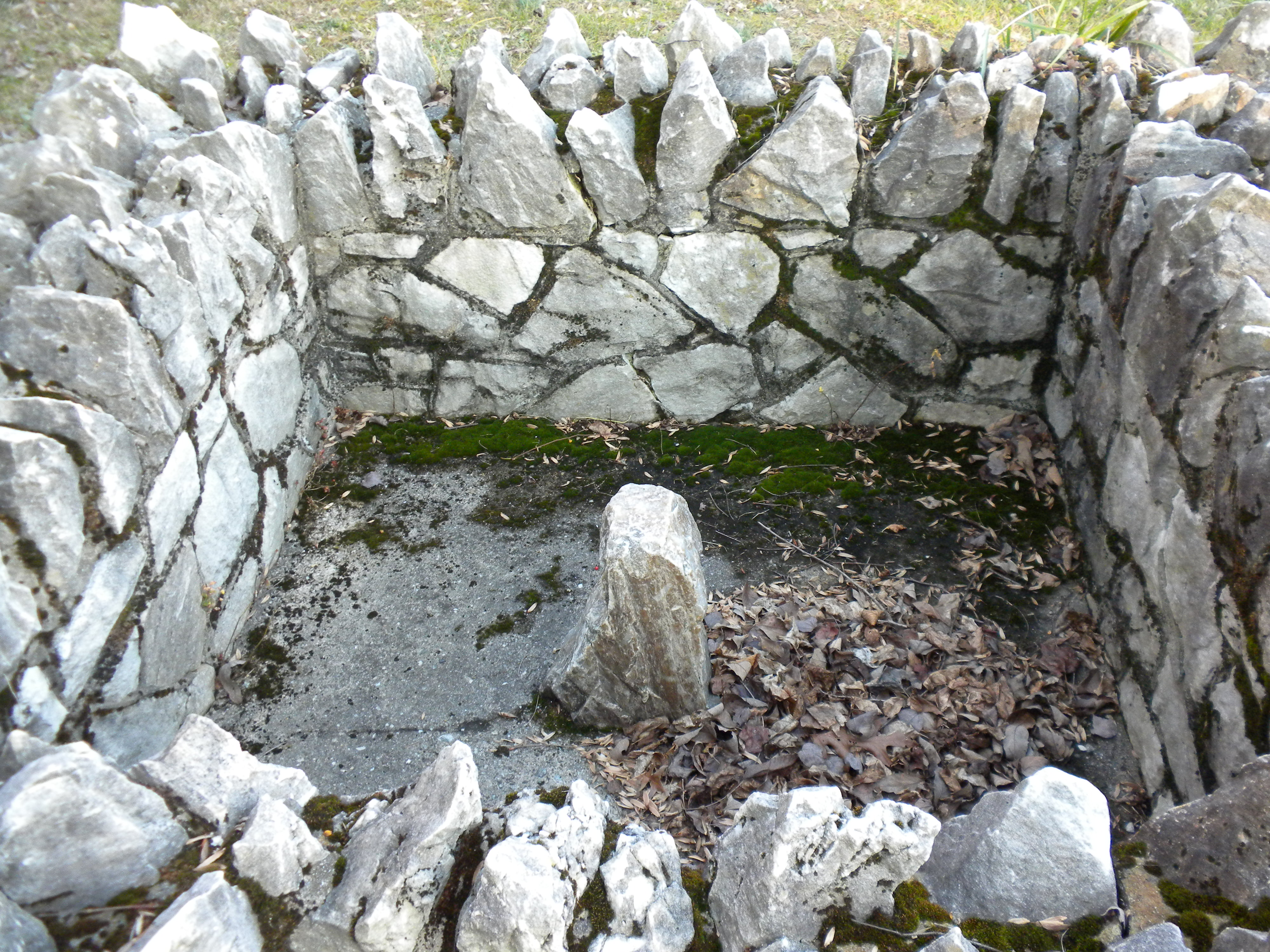
Star Gazers' Stone, an astronomical observation point, used by Charles Mason and Jeremiah Dixon

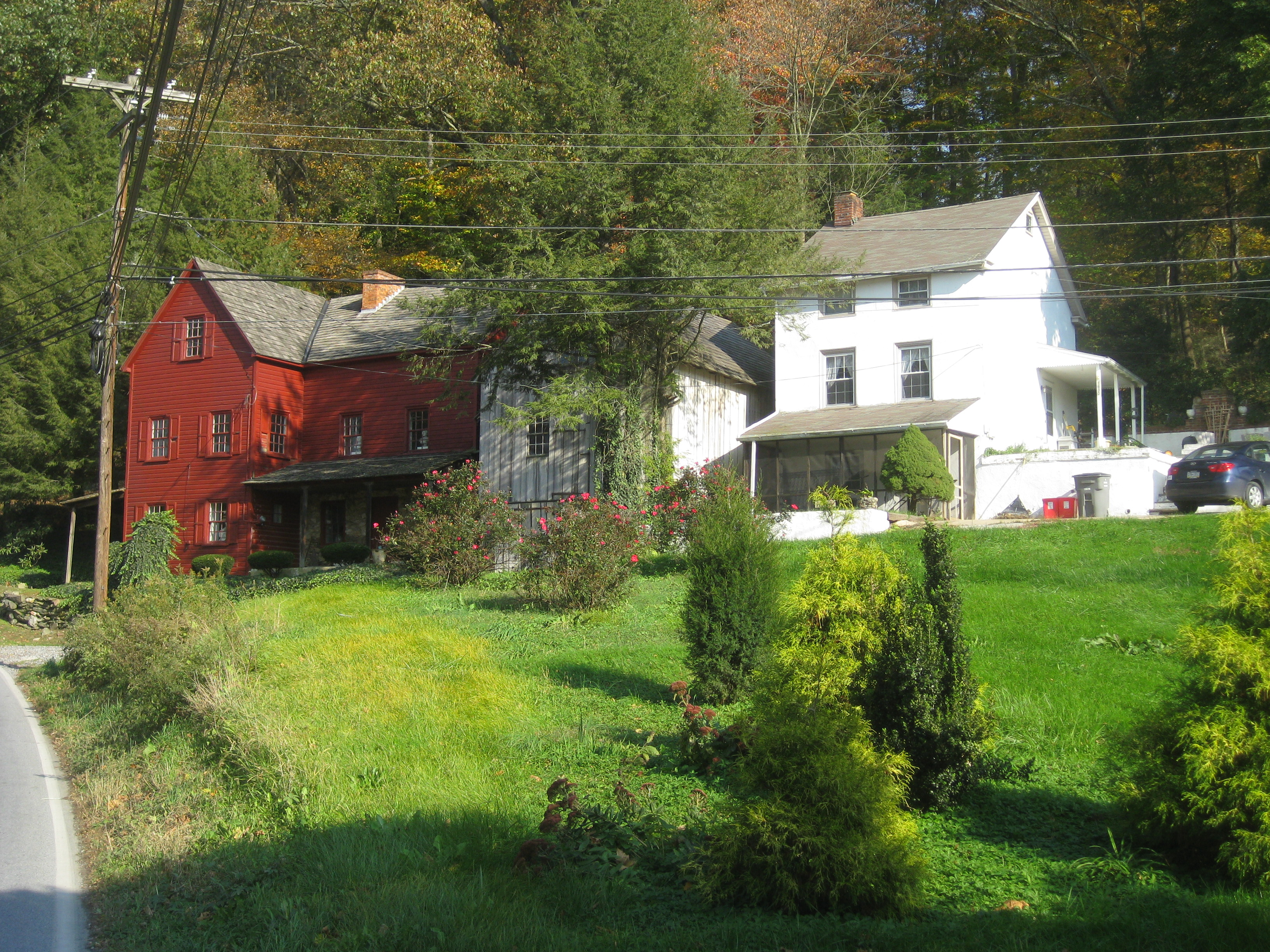
Embreeville Historic District

Embreeville is a historical unincorporated community, little more than a rural stretch of road with a few businesses and homes, in Newlin Township, Pennsylvania, United States, on a bend of Brandywine Creek. It is approximately 30 miles (48 km) west of Philadelphia, and north of Unionville. The Embreeville Historic District, which covers most of the town, is on the National Register of Historic Places.

During the 19th and 20th centuries Embreeville was best known as the site of the county poor house and the Chester County Asylum for the Insane, renamed Embreeville State Hospital in 1938 and closed in 1980. Embreeville's other landmarks include the Embreeville Dam, Embreeville Mill, Pennsylvania State Police Barracks, Star Gazers' Stone, and Hannah Freeman's grave.

The Star Gazers' Stone marked an important astronomical observation point used by Charles Mason and Jeremiah Dixon in 1764 in surveying the Mason–Dixon line, which lies 15 miles south of the stone.

It is also the location to a Pennsylvania state police station.
