= Mountain Meadow Farm =

Historic house in Pennsylvania, United States

- U.S. National Register of Historic Places
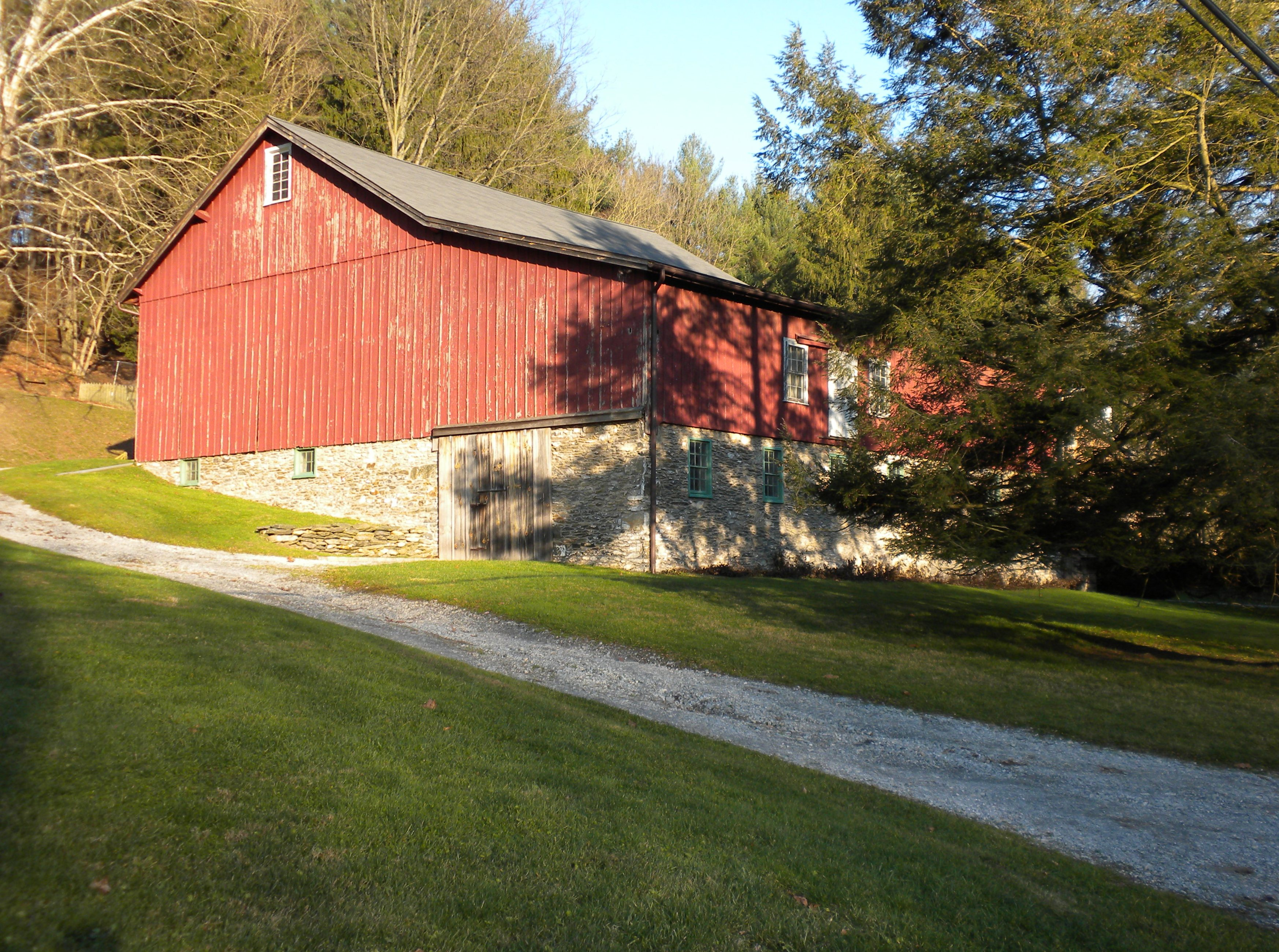
- Mountain Meadow Farm barn, December 2009

- Location within Pennsylvania Location within the United States
- Location: Harvey's Bridge Rd., Newlin Township, Pennsylvania
- Coordinates: 39°56′0″N 75°44′48″W
- Area: 2 acres (0.81 ha)
- Built: c. 1800, 1860
- Architectural style: Georgian
- MPS: West Branch Brandywine Creek MRA
- NRHP reference No.: 85002373
- Added to NRHP: September 16, 1985

Mountain Meadow Farm is a historic home and barn located in Newlin Township, Chester County, Pennsylvania. The house was built about 1800, and is a two-story, brick dwelling with basement and attic in the Georgian style. A rear addition was built in 1951. It has a gable roof, full-width front porch, and double-door facade. The large stone and frame bank barn was built about 1860.

It was added to the National Register of Historic Places in 1985.
