= National Register of Historic Places listings in Stephens County, Georgia =

This is a list of properties and districts in Stephens County, Georgia that are listed on the National Register of Historic Places (NRHP).

This National Park Service list is complete through NPS recent listings posted June 19, 2026.

== Current listings ==
	Name on the Register	Image	Date listed	Location	City or town	Description
1	Eastanollee Auditorium	Eastanollee Auditorium	March 31, 2000 (#00000301)	Northeastern corner of the junction of Eastanollee School Rd. and Red Hollow Rd. 34°31′16″N 83°15′17″W	Eastanollee	No longer extant per Google Street View
2	Jarrett-Hayes House	Jarrett-Hayes House	June 10, 1994 (#94000572)	Northeastern side of County Route 3, about 2 miles east of its junction with State Route 184; 34°37′42″N 83°15′32″W	Toccoa	
3	Martin Historic District	Martin Historic District	July 7, 1995 (#95000825)	Along both sides of State Route 17 and the Hartwell RR railroad tracks 34°29′10″N 83°11′07″W	Martin	
4	Riverside	Riverside	September 21, 1982 (#82002465)	North of Toccoa on Georgia State Route 184; 34°38′26″N 83°17′17″W	Toccoa	
5	Schaefer-Marks House	Schaefer-Marks House	December 12, 1976 (#76000647)	316 E. Doyle St. 34°34′44″N 83°19′35″W	Toccoa	
6	James B. Simmons House	James B. Simmons House	April 7, 1983 (#83000241)	130 W. Tugalo St. 34°34′50″N 83°19′53″W	Toccoa	
7	Stephens County Courthouse	Stephens County Courthouse	September 18, 1980 (#80001232)	Courthouse Sq. 34°34′47″N 83°19′51″W	Toccoa	
8	Toccoa Downtown Historic District	Toccoa Downtown Historic District	December 6, 2011 (#11000879)	Roughly bounded by Alexander, Currahee, Hill, & Savannah Sts.; also 118 W. Doyle St. 34°34′45″N 83°19′44″W	Toccoa	W. Doyle St. address represents a boundary increase, September 22, 2015.
9	Traveler's Rest	Traveler's Rest	October 15, 1966 (#66000283)	East of Toccoa on U.S. Route 123; 34°36′33″N 83°14′20″W	Toccoa	National Historic Landmark and a Georgia state historic site
10	Walters-Davis House	Walters-Davis House	June 17, 1982 (#82002464)	429 E. Tugalo St. 34°34′50″N 83°19′27″W	Toccoa	
