= Spruce Grove School =

- U.S. National Register of Historic Places
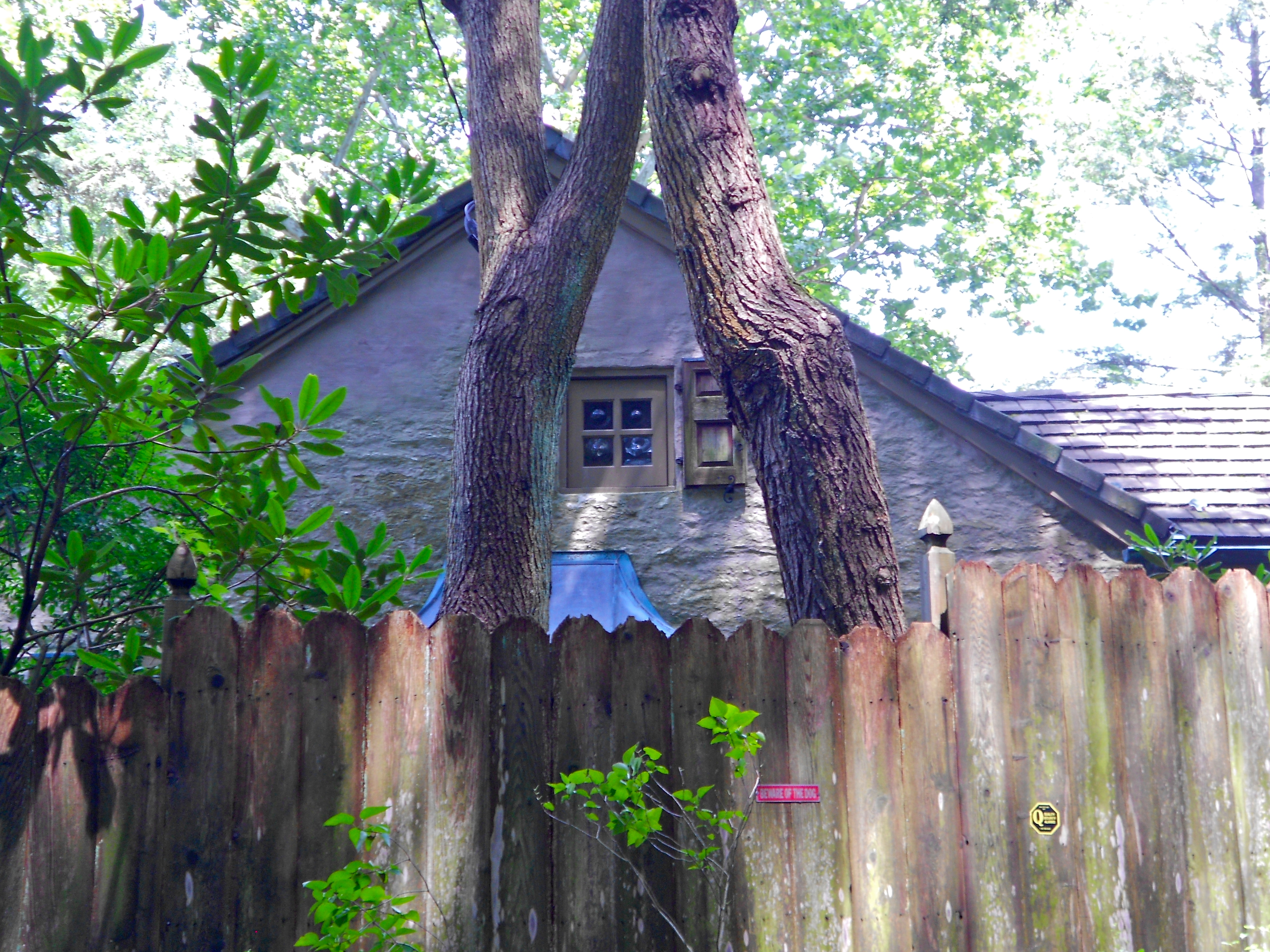
- Hidden behind a tall fence

- Location within Pennsylvania Location within the United States
- Location: Brandywine Creek Rd., Newlin Township, Pennsylvania
- Coordinates: 39°56′7″N 75°46′8″W
- Area: 0.6 acres (0.24 ha)
- Built: 1839
- MPS: West Branch Brandywine Creek MRA
- NRHP reference No.: 85002378
- Added to NRHP: September 16, 1985

The Spruce Grove School is an historic, one-room school in Newlin Township, Chester County, Pennsylvania, United States.

It was added to the National Register of Historic Places in 1985.

== History and architectural features ==
This historic school was built in 1839, and is a one-story, twenty-four-foot-square stone structure with a gable roof and a corbeled stone cornice. In 1924, Spruce Grove School was converted to a private residence. Also located on the property is a stone abutment for a suspension bridge that once crossed the adjacent West Branch of the Brandywine River.
