= West Branch Brandywine Creek =

Location
- Country: United States of America

Physical characteristics
- Source
  - coordinates: 40°6′51″N 75°55′35″W; Chester County, Pennsylvania
  - elevation: 850 ft (260 m)
- Mouth
  - coordinates: 39°55′21″N 075°38′58″W; Brandywine Creek, Chester County, Pennsylvania
  - elevation: 174 ft (53 m)

The West Branch Brandywine Creek is a 33.1-mile-long (53.3 km) tributary of Brandywine Creek in Chester County, Pennsylvania in the United States.

The West Branch Brandywine Creek is born near the community of Honey Brook. It later joins with the East Branch Brandywine Creek in the community of Lenape to form Brandywine Creek.

The Embreeville Historic District straddles the West Branch Brandywine Creek in Newlin Township.

== See also ==
- List of rivers of Pennsylvania
