= Hay House (disambiguation) =

Hay House is a book publisher located in California.

It may also refer to:

- Johnston-Felton-Hay House, Macon, Georgia, a U.S. National Historic Landmark often known as Hay House
- Hay-Morrison House, Salem, Indiana, listed on the National Register of Historic Places
- Dr. J.A. Hay House, La Grange, Missouri, listed on the NRHP in Lewis County, Missouri
- Hay Estate (The Fells), Newbury, New Hampshire, NRHP-listed
- Hay-McKinney and Bingham-Hanna House, Cleveland, Ohio, listed on the NRHP in Cleveland, Ohio
- Hay house is a rare term for a hay barn

== See also ==
- Hays House (disambiguation)
- Hayes House (disambiguation)
