= House at Upper Laurel Iron Works =

Historic house in Pennsylvania, United States

- U.S. National Register of Historic Places
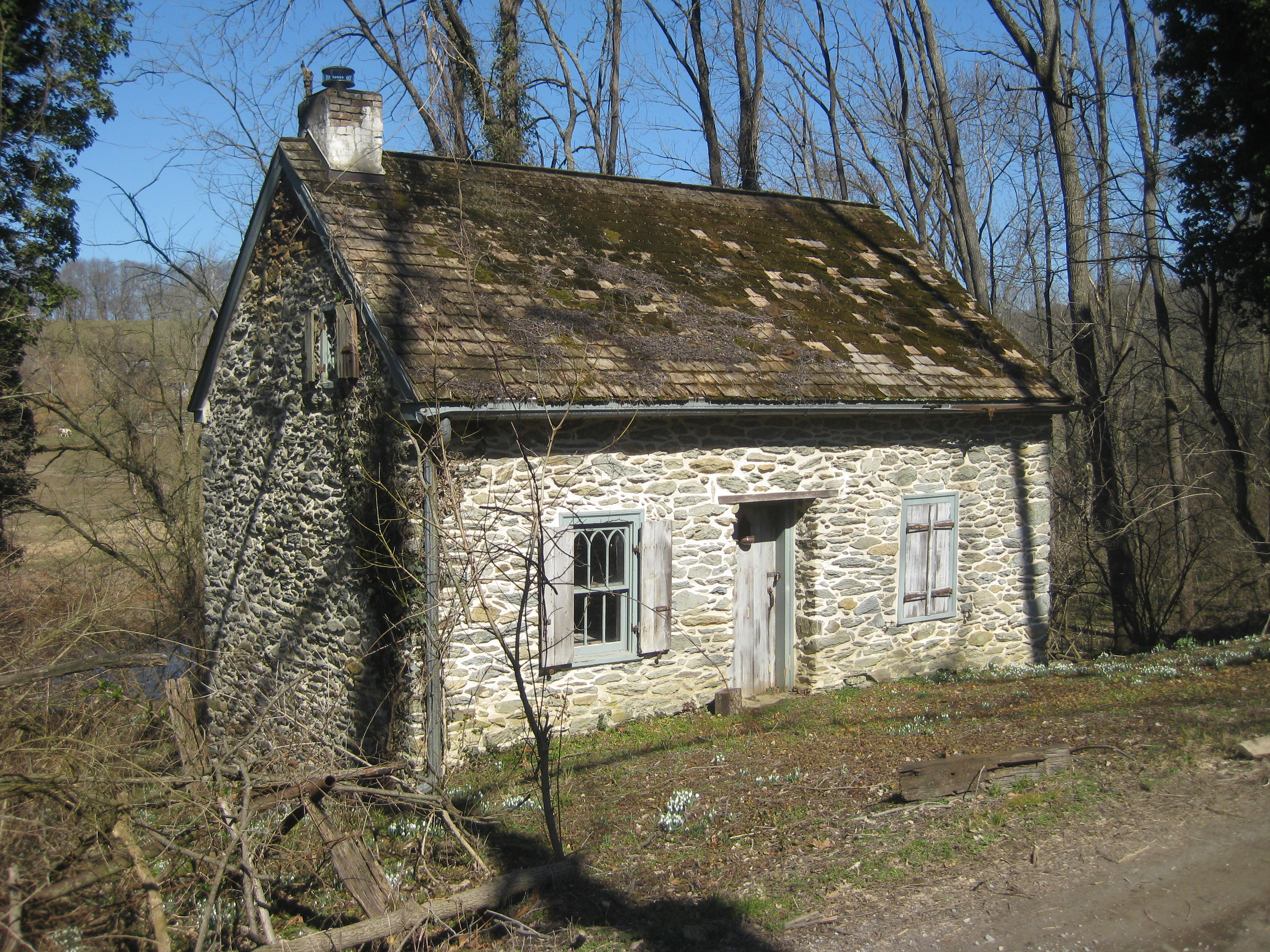
- House at Upper Laurel Iron Works, February 2012

- Location within Pennsylvania Location within the United States
- Location: McCorkel's Rock Rd., Newlin Township, Pennsylvania
- Coordinates: 39°56′0″N 75°46′47″W
- Area: 0.5 acres (0.20 ha)
- Built: 1872
- MPS: West Branch Brandywine Creek MRA
- NRHP reference No.: 85002371
- Added to NRHP: September 16, 1985

House at Upper Laurel Iron Works is a historic home located in Newlin Township, Chester County, Pennsylvania. It was built about 1872, and is a two-story, stone banked dwelling with a gable roof.

It was added to the National Register of Historic Places in 1985.
