= Indian Deep Farm =

- U.S. National Register of Historic Places
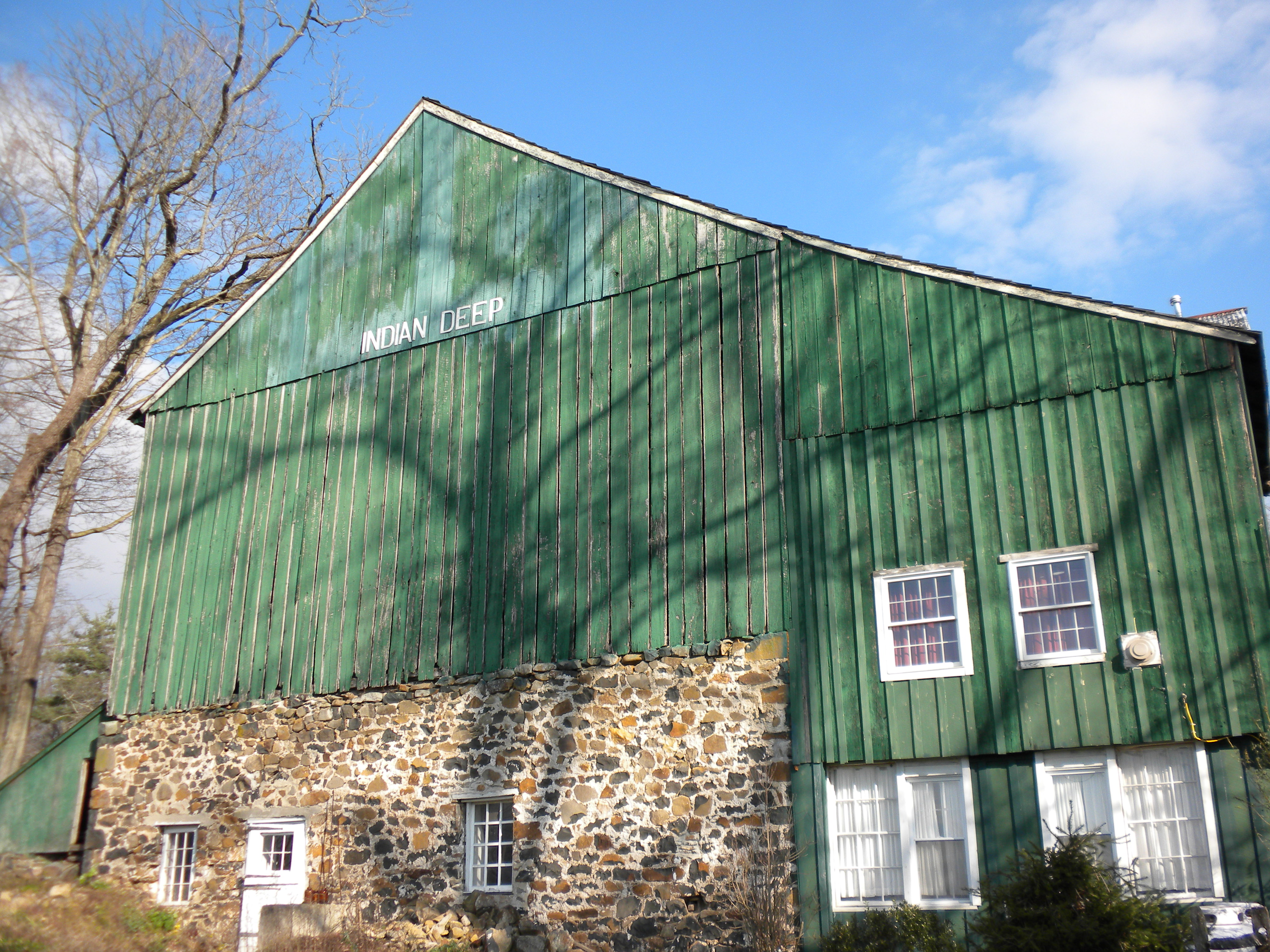
- Indian Deep Farm barn, December 2009

- Location within Pennsylvania Location within the United States
- Location: Brandywine Dr. and War Path Rd., Newlin Township, Pennsylvania
- Coordinates: 39°55′34″N 75°41′59″W
- Area: 22.4 acres (9.1 ha)
- Architectural style: Penn Plan
- MPS: West Branch Brandywine Creek MRA
- NRHP reference No.: 85002372
- Added to NRHP: September 16, 1985

Indian Deep Farm is an historic home and farm which are located in Newlin Township, Chester County, Pennsylvania.

This property was added to the National Register of Historic Places in 1985.

== History and architectural features ==
The oldest part of the house, dates back to the early 1700s. The house consists of a two-story, five-bay, brick, main block which dates to the 1830s, with a two-story, two-bay, stone core section. Both the main block and core have gable roofs. Also located on the property are a stone and frame bank barn, shop, slaughterhouse, and one-and-one-half-story frame tenant house that was built over a spring. The property also includes a stone walled stockyard.
