= Hannah Freeman =

Lenape indigenous healer, artisan, and farmer (1731–1802)

Coordinates: 39°56′21″N 75°43′36″W

- Born: March 1731; Newlin Township, Chester County, Pennsylvania
- Died: March 20, 1802; Embreeville, Pennsylvania
- Other name: Indian Hannah
- Occupations: Healer, artisan, farmer
- Known for: Last surviving Lenape in Chester County, Pennsylvania

Hannah Freeman (March 1731 – March 20, 1802), also known as "Indian Hannah," was a Lenape healer, artisan, and farmer who historically was thought to be the last surviving member of the Lenape in Chester County, Pennsylvania.

== Biography ==
Freeman was born in March 1731 in a log cabin on Lenape ancestral lands claimed by Quaker assemblyman William Webb on Brandywine Creek. Located in Newlin Township, the property would become part of Longwood Gardens. She grew up in a close-knit matrilineal extended family of grandmother, mother, and aunts. During her youth, as early as the 1730s, her father moved to Shamokin and never returned, reportedly to escape the swelling colonial population in the Brandywine Valley.

Freeman grew up fluent in both English and Unami languages and customs. She earned a living by spinning, sewing, making brooms, weaving baskets, and working for neighboring Quaker farmers. She gained a reputation for healing the sick through her knowledge of indigenous medicinal plants. In addition, she grew corn and vegetables on her own small farm, caught fish and turtles, and raised cows and pigs. On her travels she was often accompanied by her two dogs, Elmun and Putmoe. She may have had a Lenape common-law husband named Andrew Freeman, but nothing is known about him, and there is no evidence of her having had any children.

In 1758, Freeman moved to Chester Creek to live with relatives and steer clear of the violence between western Lenape and colonial Pennsylvanians during the French and Indian War. She returned home a year later. In 1764, Freeman and her kinsfolk fled to Woodbury, New Jersey, to escape the Paxton Boys, who had massacred a peaceful Susquehannock community nearby on December 13, 1763. They lived in New Jersey for seven years before returning to their ancestral lands on the Brandywine. At various times she lived in a summer cabin in Centreville, Delaware, working in her usual manner as an itinerant trader and small farmer. Tragedy set in and she slowly lost her support network of Lenape women when her grandmother Jane died in 1775, her aunt Betty in 1780, her mother Sarah in 1785, and her aunt Nanny soon after.

In the 1790s, Freeman's health began to fail due to rheumatoid arthritis and other ailments. She gave up her farmstead and travels and began living year-round with various Quaker neighbors in Newlin Township, working as best she could in return for room and board. These neighbors increasingly regarded her as a charity case.

In 1797, Freeman was legally declared indigent. In 1798, thirty-four of her Quaker neighbors banded together and agreed to provide for her in a pact they labeled "Kindness Extended." On November 12, 1800, Freeman was admitted to the newly opened Chester County Alms House in Embreeville, where she died on March 20, 1802. Her dying wish was to be buried in an old Indian cemetery by the Brandywine, but her interment instead became the first in the potter's field behind the poorhouse.

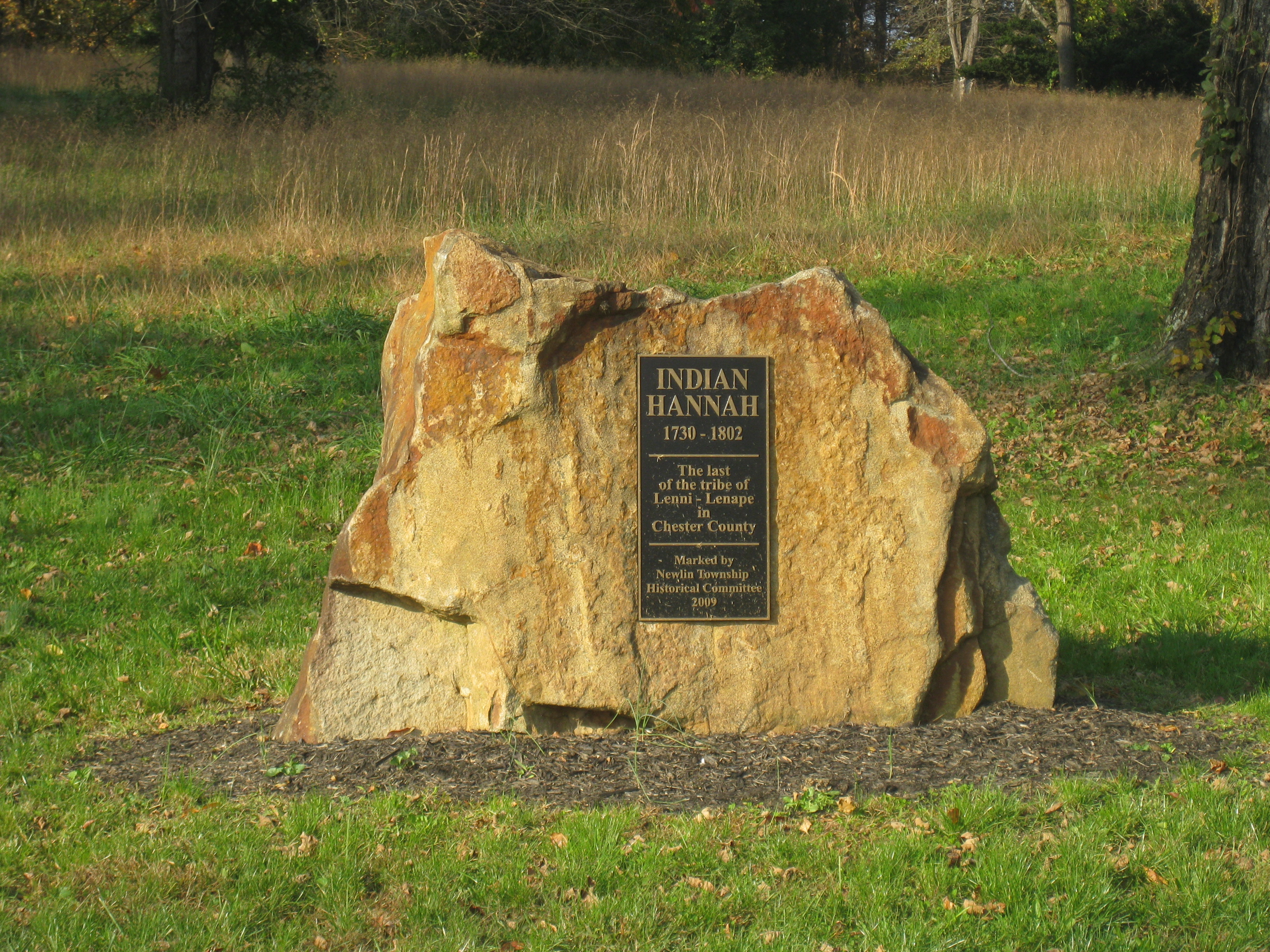
Historical marker in Chester County

== Impact and legacy ==
The declaration that Freeman was "an ancient woman of the Delaware tribe and the only person of that description left among us" was made in 1800 when her neighbors committed her to the county poorhouse. Freeman's Quaker neighbors had settled on land that her people had never ceded or sold. Because she was purportedly the last surviving Lenape, Freeman's death legitimized these land seizures by upholding William Penn's promise that the lands belonged to her people until the last Lenape had abandoned them. Freeman's seasonal migrations seemed to underscore the Lenape's perceived lack of land ownership. As of 2021, Pennsylvania remains one of the few U.S. states with no Indian reservations and no tribes that have gained federal or state recognition.

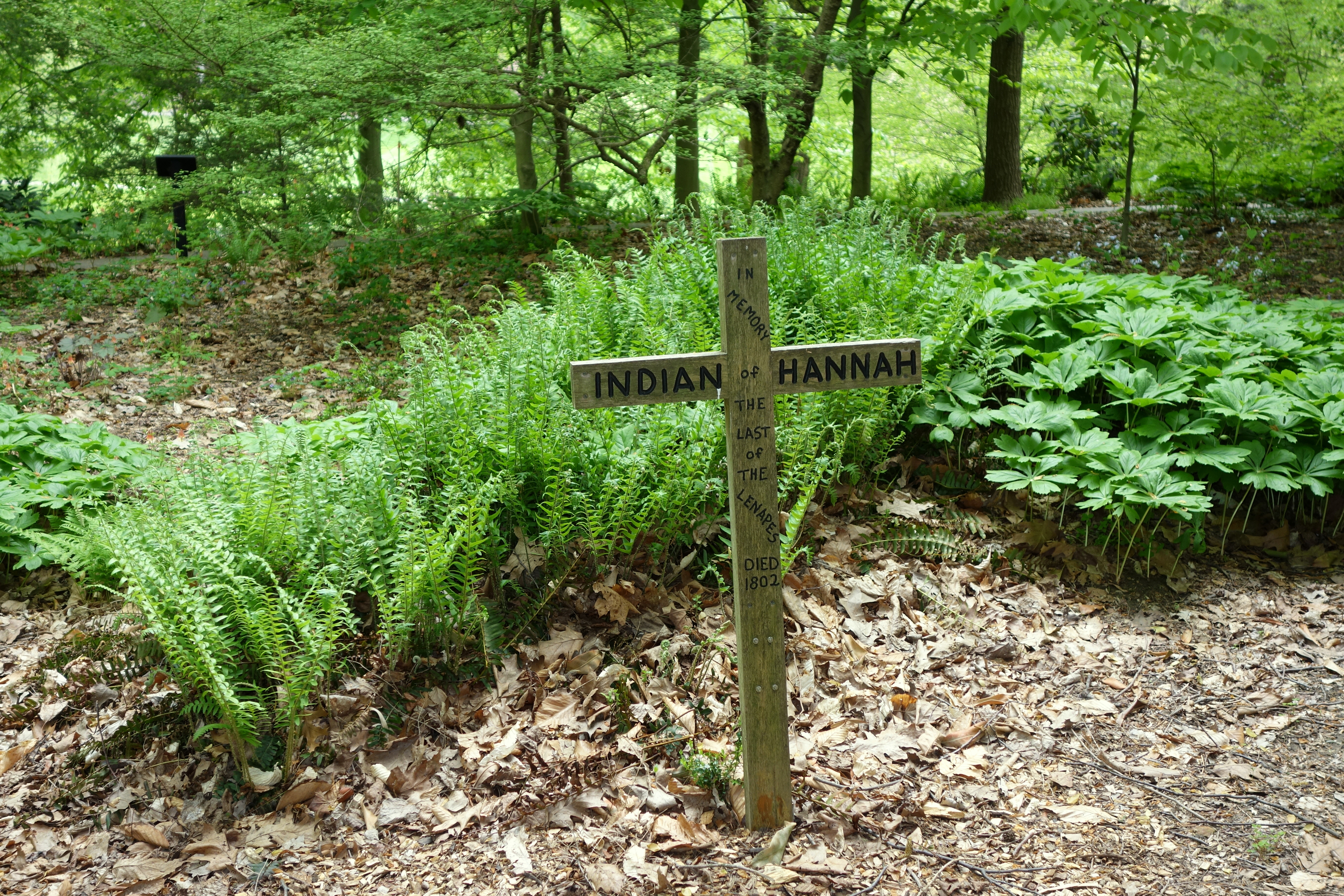
Memorial at Longwood Gardens

No photographs or drawings of Freeman exist. A road is named after her ("Indian Hannah Road") in Newlin Township, and there are two memorial markers for her in Chester County, near Embreeville. One of these markers was erected in 1925, when the Pennsylvania Historical and Museum Commission and the Chester County Historical Society erected a bronze plaque on a large boulder to commemorate her birthplace. This marker is located on Pennsylvania Route 52 about one tenth of a mile north of the intersection with U.S. Route 1. Her gravesite is marked by another bronze plaque mounted on a boulder in 1909 by the Chester County Historical Society. Longwood Gardens features a simple memorial cross dedicated to Hannah Freeman, continuing a nineteenth-century tradition begun by one of the previous owners of the property, George W. Peirce (1814–1880).

Freeman preserved a bean traditionally grown by her Lenape people as part of the Three Sisters companion planting technique. The bean was named "Indian Hannah" in her honor. It is grown by Truelove Seeds Farm in Glenn Mills as of 2022.

Two baskets reportedly made by Freeman are held in the collections of the Chester County History Center.
