= Joseph Young House =

Historic house in Pennsylvania, United States

- U.S. National Register of Historic Places
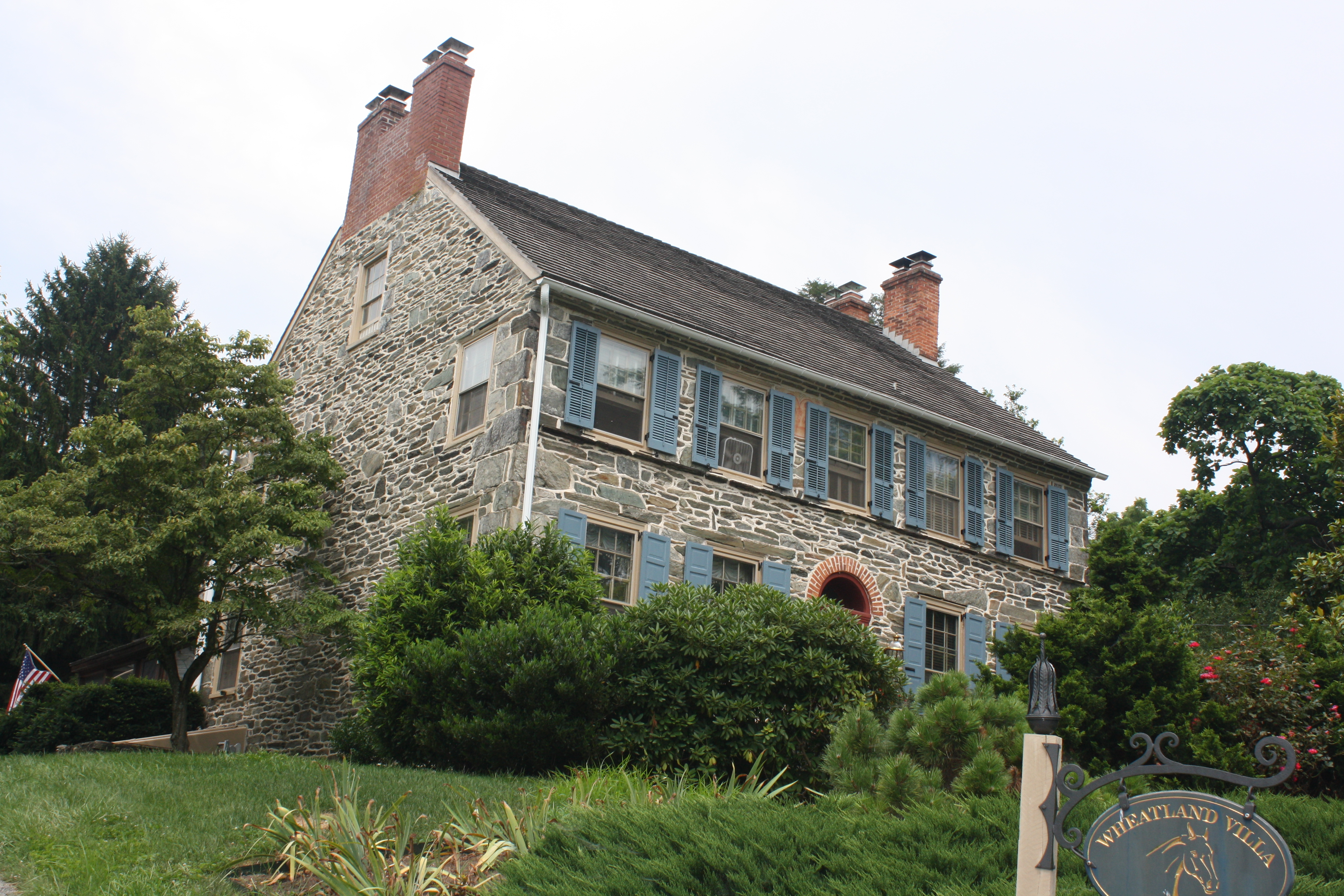
- Joseph Young House. July 2013.

- Location within Pennsylvania Location within the United States
- Location: Creek Rd., Newlin Township, Pennsylvania
- Coordinates: 39°56′12″N 75°45′39″W
- Area: 6.4 acres (2.6 ha)
- Built: 1835
- Architectural style: Gothic, Georgian, Federal
- MPS: West Branch Brandywine Creek MRA
- NRHP reference No.: 85002383
- Added to NRHP: September 16, 1985

The Joseph Young House is an historic home that is located in Newlin Township, Chester County, Pennsylvania.

It was added to the National Register of Historic Places in 1985.

== History and architectural features ==
This house was built in 1835, and is a two-story, five-bay, fieldstone dwelling that was designed in a Georgian/Federal style. It has a large, two-story, stone, rear kitchen and bedroom wing. It has a gable roof, and features a central entrance with semi-circular fanlight and dual gable end chimneys with parapets. Also located on the property are a banked milkhouse/smokehouse and a four-seat, Gothic-style outhouse.
