= William B. Hayes House =

Historic building in Des Moines, Iowa, US

- U.S. National Register of Historic Places
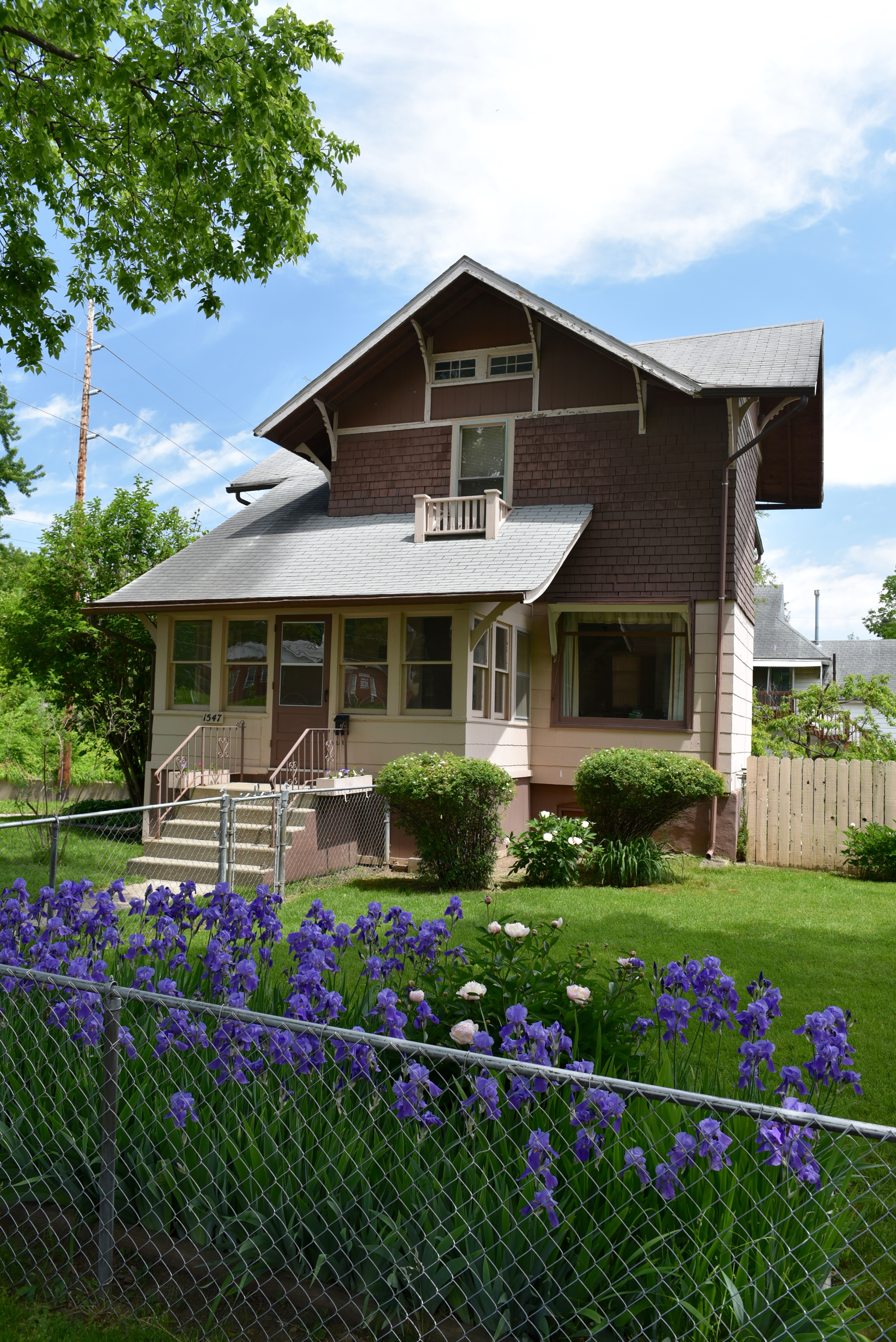

- Location within Iowa Location within the United States
- Location: 1547 Arlington Ave. Des Moines, Iowa
- Coordinates: 41°36′27.1″N 93°37′19″W
- Area: less than one acre
- Built: 1886
- Built by: Lowry W. Goode
- Architectural style: Stick/Eastlake
- MPS: Towards a Greater Des Moines MPS
- NRHP reference No.: 96001140
- Added to NRHP: October 25, 1996

The William B. Hayes House is a historic building located in Des Moines, Iowa, United States. The house is significant for its being one of the best examples in Des Moines of the Swiss chalet style subtype of the Stick Style. It was built in 1886 as a single-family dwelling by local developer Lowry W. Goode. This 1½-story frame structure on a brick foundation features a gable-end facade that is intersected by side gables, and wide eaves that are supported by wood braces. The northern side gable extends over an enclosed front porch. The house was listed on the National Register of Historic Places in 1996.
