= Hays-Kiser House =

Historic house in Tennessee, United States

- U.S. National Register of Historic Places
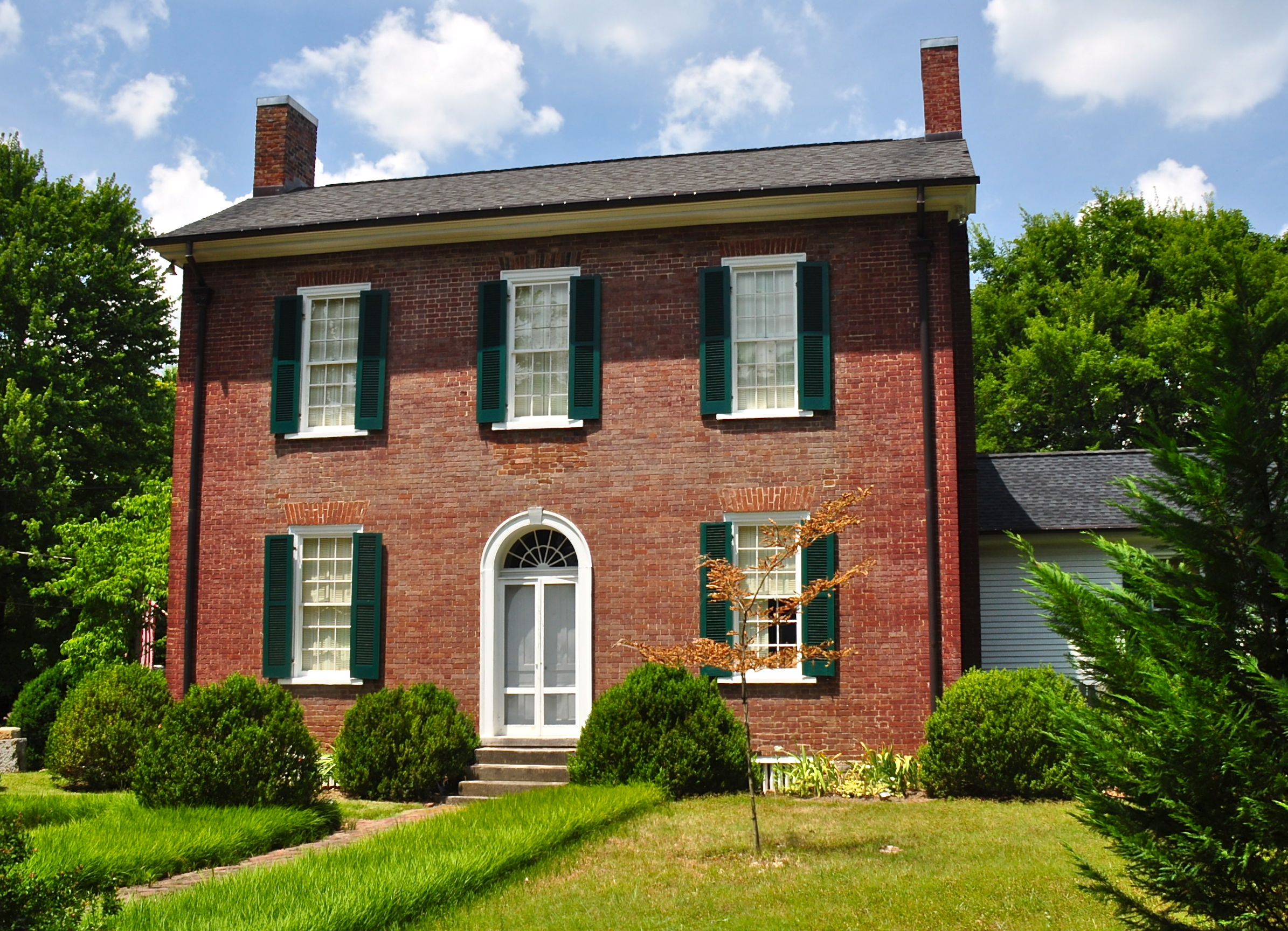
- The Hays-Kiser House in 2014

- Location within Tennessee
- Location: 834 Reeves Road, Antioch, Tennessee
- Coordinates: 36°3′55″N 86°40′20″W
- Area: 3 acres (1.2 ha)
- Built: 1795
- Architectural style: Federal
- NRHP reference No.: 74001906
- Added to NRHP: September 10, 1974

The Hays-Kiser House is a historic house in Antioch, Tennessee, U.S.. It was built in 1795 for Charles Hays, a settler from North Carolina. It has been listed on the National Register of Historic Places since September 10, 1974.
