= Hays-Pitzer House =

Historic house in West Virginia, United States

- U.S. National Register of Historic Places
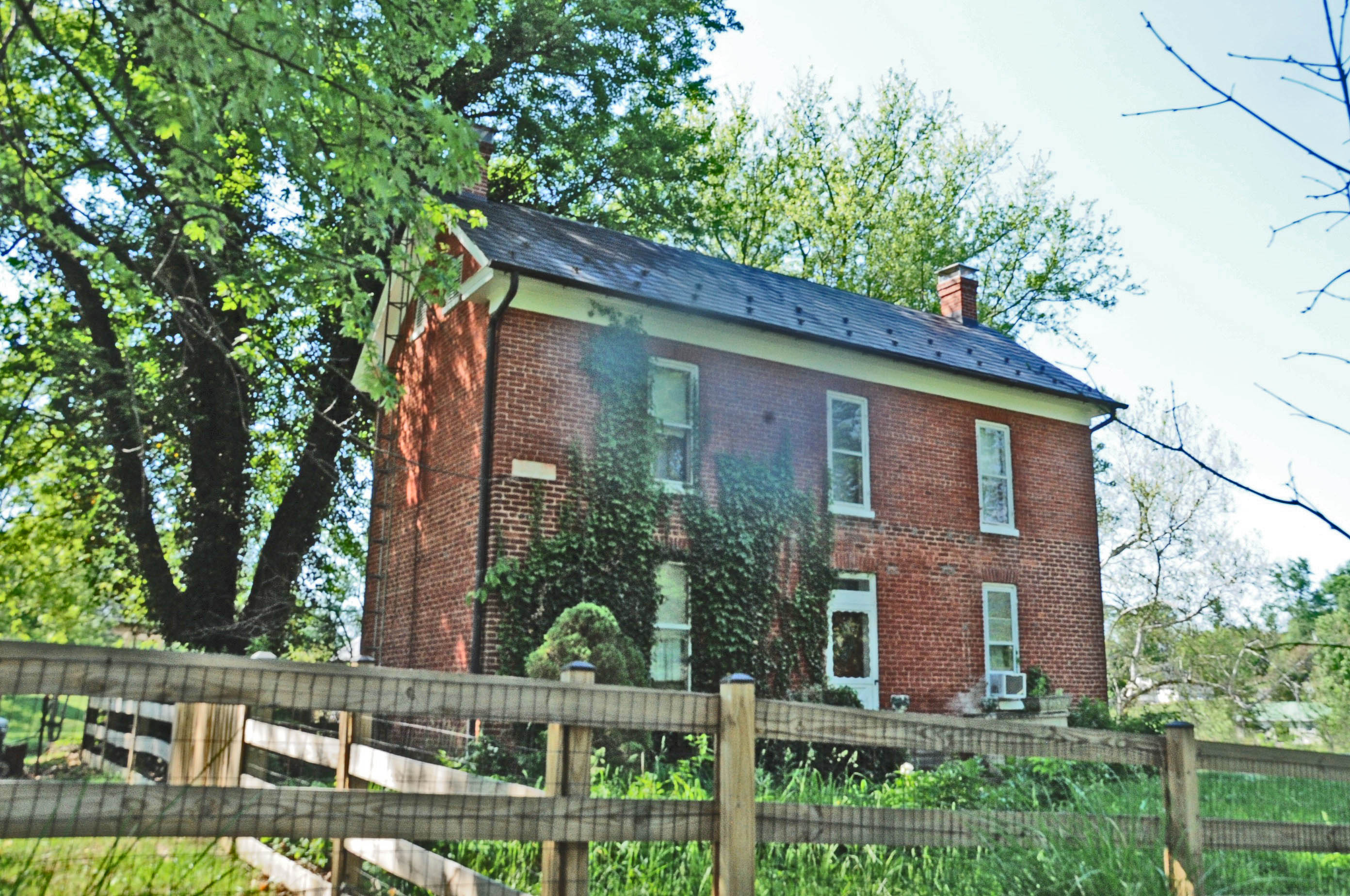
- The Hays-Pitzer House

- Location within West Virginia Location within the United States
- Location: Middle Creek Rd. (WV 45) north of Inwood, near Martinsburg, West Virginia
- Coordinates: 39°25′0″N 78°3′53″W
- Area: 2.3 acres (0.93 ha)
- Built: 1775, c. 1800
- Architect: Hays, John
- Architectural style: Federal
- NRHP reference No.: 94001294
- Added to NRHP: November 21, 1994

Hays-Pitzer House is a historic home located near Martinsburg, Berkeley County, West Virginia. It is a two-story, five-bay, Federal-style log and stone dwelling. The log section of the house was built in 1775 and the stone section was built around 1800.

It was listed on the National Register of Historic Places in 1994.
