= Hayes-Byrum Store and House =

Historic buildings in North Carolina, United States

- U.S. National Register of Historic Places
- U.S. Historic district
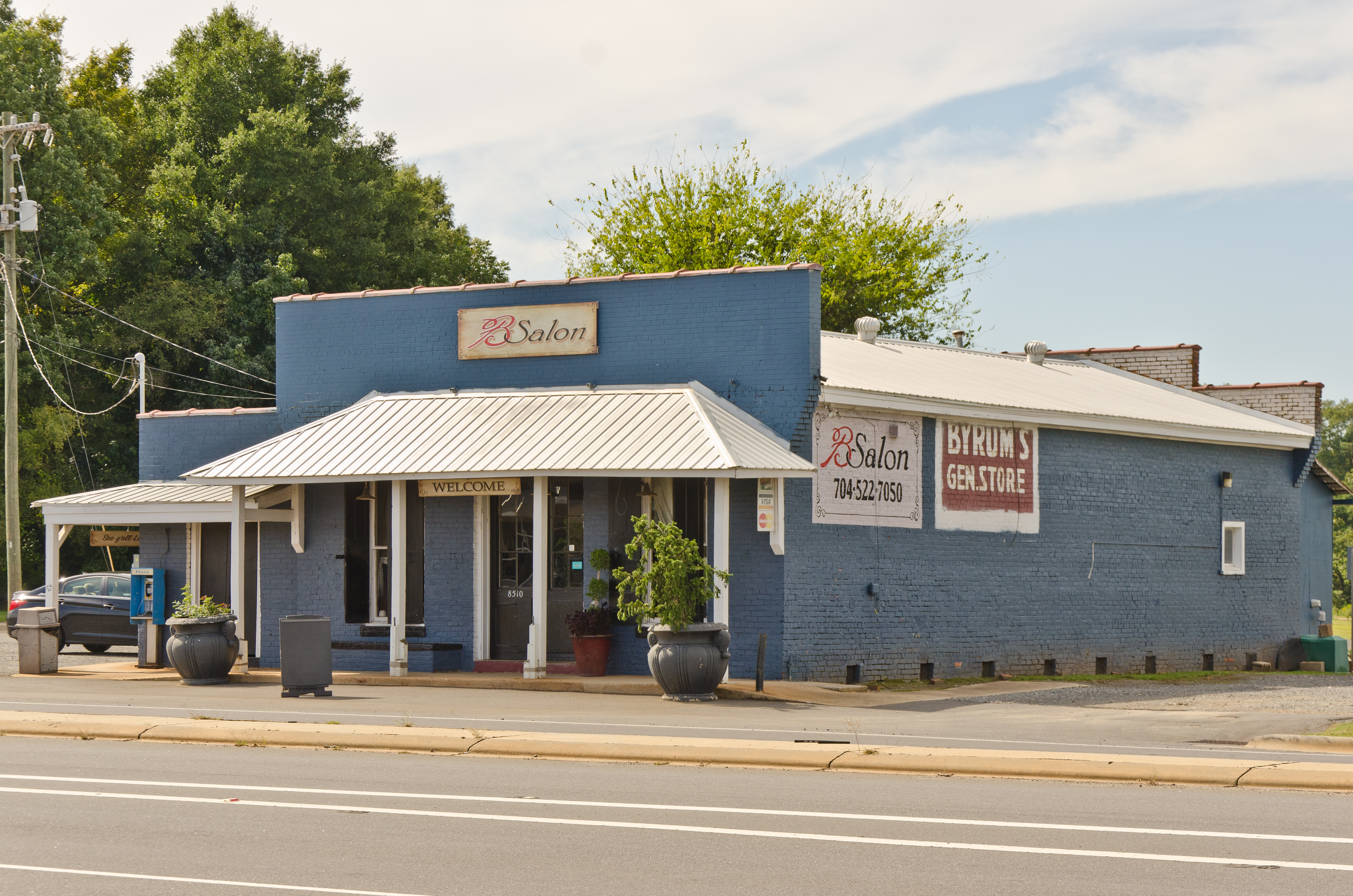
- Hayes-Byrum Store, September 2014

- Location within North Carolina Location within the United States
- Location: NC 160 S of jct. with Shopton Rd., near Charlotte, North Carolina
- Coordinates: 35°10′12″N 80°57′48″W
- Area: 1.2 acres (0.49 ha)
- Built: c. 1890, c. 1900
- Architectural style: Queen Anne, Vernacular commercial
- MPS: Rural Mecklenburg County MPS
- NRHP reference No.: 90002186
- Added to NRHP: January 31, 1991

Hayes-Byrum Store and House is a historic home, store, and national historic district located near Charlotte, Mecklenburg County, North Carolina. The store was built about 1890, and is a one-story, gable front, brick building. It measures 35 feet by 60 feet and has a wide, arched entrance with wooden double doors. North of the store is the two story, asymmetrical, Queen Anne style frame dwelling built about 1900. It has a cross-gable roof and features a cutaway bay. The store is considered the oldest surviving commercial building in rural Mecklenburg County.

It was added to the National Register of Historic Places in 1991.
