= John R. Hays House =

Historic house in New York, United States

- U.S. National Register of Historic Places
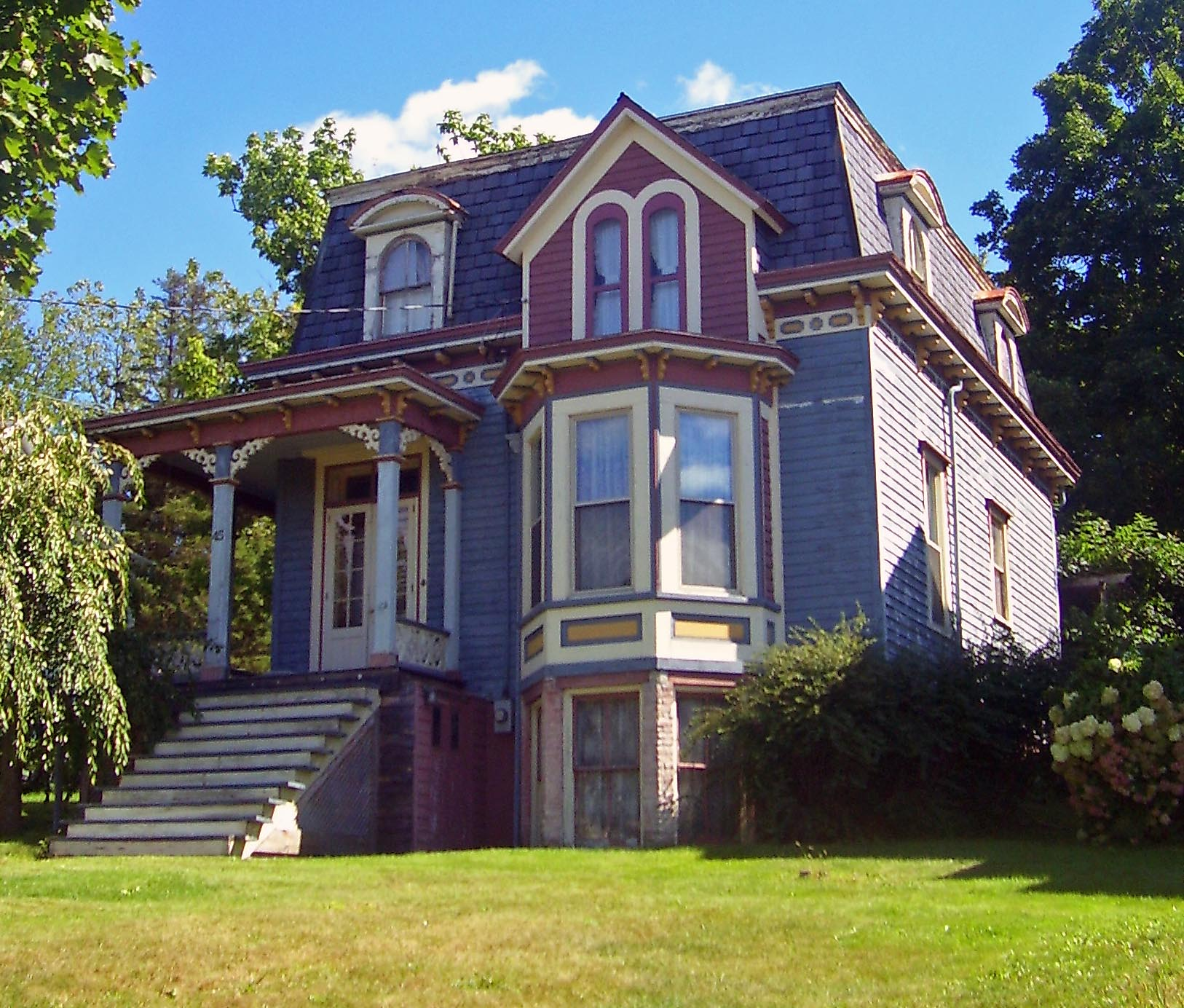
- Front (north) elevation and west profile, 2007

- Location within New York Location within the United States
- Location: 45 Maple St, Walden, New York
- Coordinates: 41°33′35″N 74°11′21″W
- Built: 1874
- Architectural style: Second Empire
- NRHP reference No.: 02000880
- Added to NRHP: August 22, 2002

The John R. Hays House is located on Maple Street in Walden, New York. Hayes, a prominent local businessman of the late 19th century and officer in the 124th New York Volunteer Infantry Regiment during the Civil War, built it in a Second Empire style.

It has been largely unaltered since its original construction. In 2002 it was listed on the National Register of Historic Places (NRHP).

== Description ==
It is a two-by-two-bay two-story building on a rubblestone foundation mostly exposed in front by the downward slope of the property. Clapboard siding gives way to a decorated frieze and bracketed cornice at the roofline. The mansard roof is shingled in modern asphalt that resembles the slate that was originally used.

A single round-arched dormer window on the east of the roof is complemented by a gabled dormer with double window next to that itself tops two stories of oriel windows. Next to it, the main entrance is framed by a porch which wraps around the eastern side of the house. It is fronted with a balustrade of scroll sawn panels, and a set of stairs drops to the ground in front of the double-doored entrance.

Other than the porch, the east facade is much less decorative than the front, with a single window in each bay on both stories. There is another pair of stairs on this side. The west elevation has just the windows. The south is where the slightly offset single-story rear wing is connected.

The interior follows a side hall plan. The staircase from the entry hall has a turned newel and balusters with a detailed handrail. A four-paneled wooden door leads into the front parlor, where a round-arched entryway opens into the oriel window. Many other rooms in the house are still decorated and finished as they originally were.

A small barn in the rear of the property has since been converted into its garage, but retains most of its original finishings. It is considered a contributing resource to the NRHP listing.

== History ==
Hays, who was born in Walden in 1840, served in the 124th New York Volunteer Infantry Regiment, a locally raised unit known as the "Orange Blossoms", during the Civil War. He saw action in many important battles of the conflict, including Chancellorsville, Fredericksburg and Gettysburg. After being wounded, he was honorably discharged as a lieutenant and returned home.

There, he served as the local agent for the Wallkill Valley Railroad, which ran through the eastern section of the village. He built the house in 1874, two years before moving on to other businesses, including service as the vice president of several local banks. He was active in veterans' affairs, including raising money for the monument to the Orange Blossoms in the center of the village, a short walk from the house.

In 1900 the rear wing was added to the house, the only substantial revision to its original design. Twelve years later, when Hays died, the village mourned the loss of "one of its foundation stones" during a period in which it had prospered and greatly expanded.
