= Dr. David Brandon House =

Historic house in Georgia, United States

- U.S. National Register of Historic Places
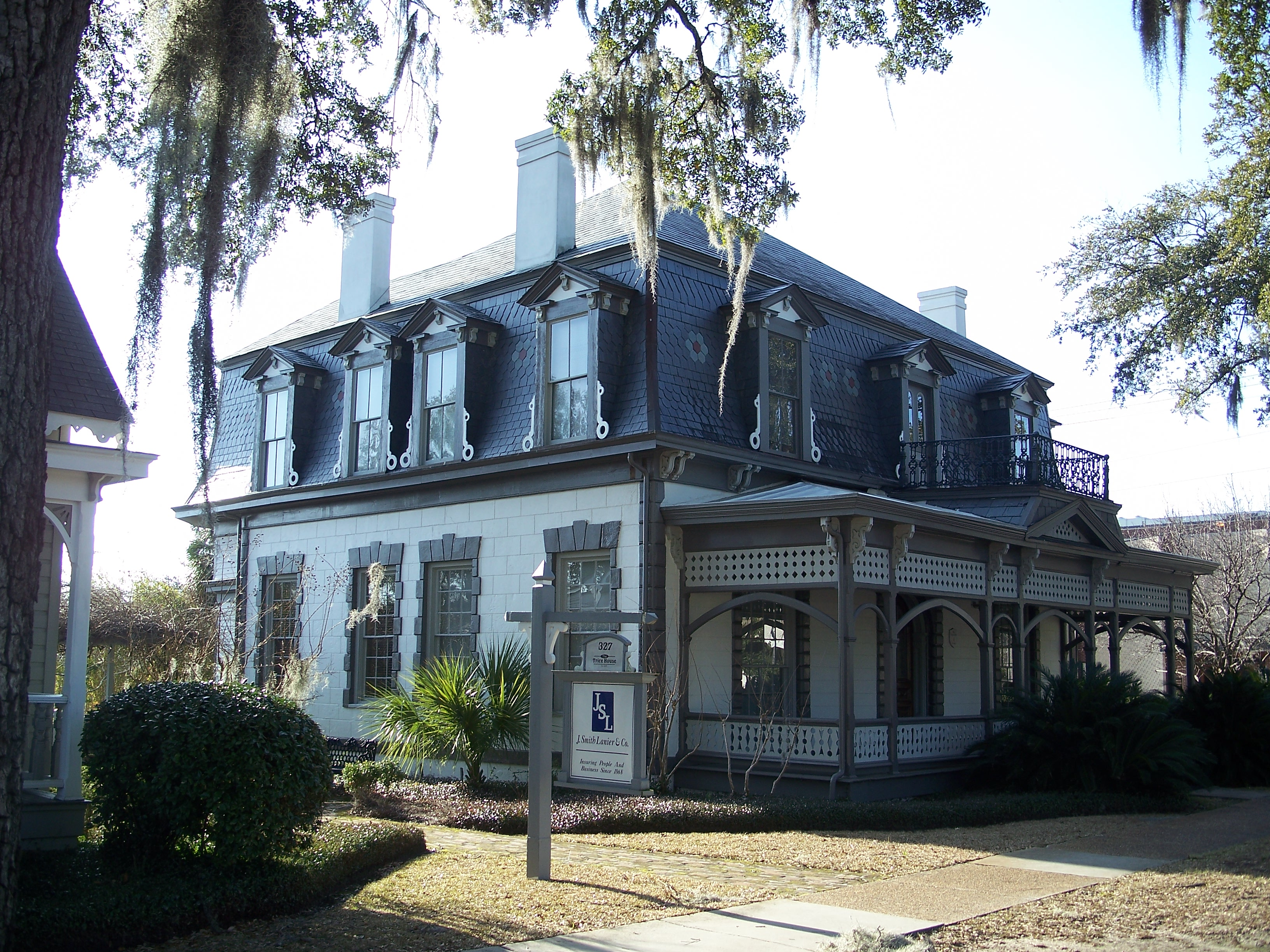

- Location within Georgia Location within the United States
- Location: 329 N. Broad St., Thomasville, Georgia
- Coordinates: 30°50′24″N 83°58′59″W
- Area: 0.3 acres (0.12 ha)
- Built: c.1851, 1870s
- NRHP reference No.: 70000217
- Added to NRHP: September 4, 1970

The Dr. David Brandon House, also known as Hayes House, in Thomasville, Georgia, was built as a one-story brick house in 1851. A second floor with mansard roof was added in the 1870s. It was listed on the National Register of Historic Places in 1970.

The house was built for Thomas Jones of Greenwood Plantation to serve as a wedding gift for his daughter Harriet and her husband, Dr. David S.Brandon. The house was sold to Mrs. John H. Hayes in 1862 and remained in the Hayes family in 1970.
