= Hays House (Lorman, Mississippi) =

Historic house in Mississippi, United States

- U.S. National Register of Historic Places
- Location within Mississippi
- Location: 18800 Highway 61 south, Lorman, Mississippi
- Coordinates: 31°49′3″N 91°3′0″W
- Built: 1858
- Architectural style: Greek Revival
- NRHP reference No.: 09000111
- Added to NRHP: March 10, 2009

The Hays House is an historic Greek Revival house near Lorman, Mississippi. It was listed on the National Register of Historic Places on March 10, 2009. The Hays House is one of a few Greek Revival cottages in Mississippi to have a "full-façade gallery". The property was the Highlighted Property of the Week when the National Park Service released its weekly list of March 20, 2009.
