= Hayes Mill House =

Historic house in Pennsylvania, United States

- U.S. National Register of Historic Places
- U.S. Historic district
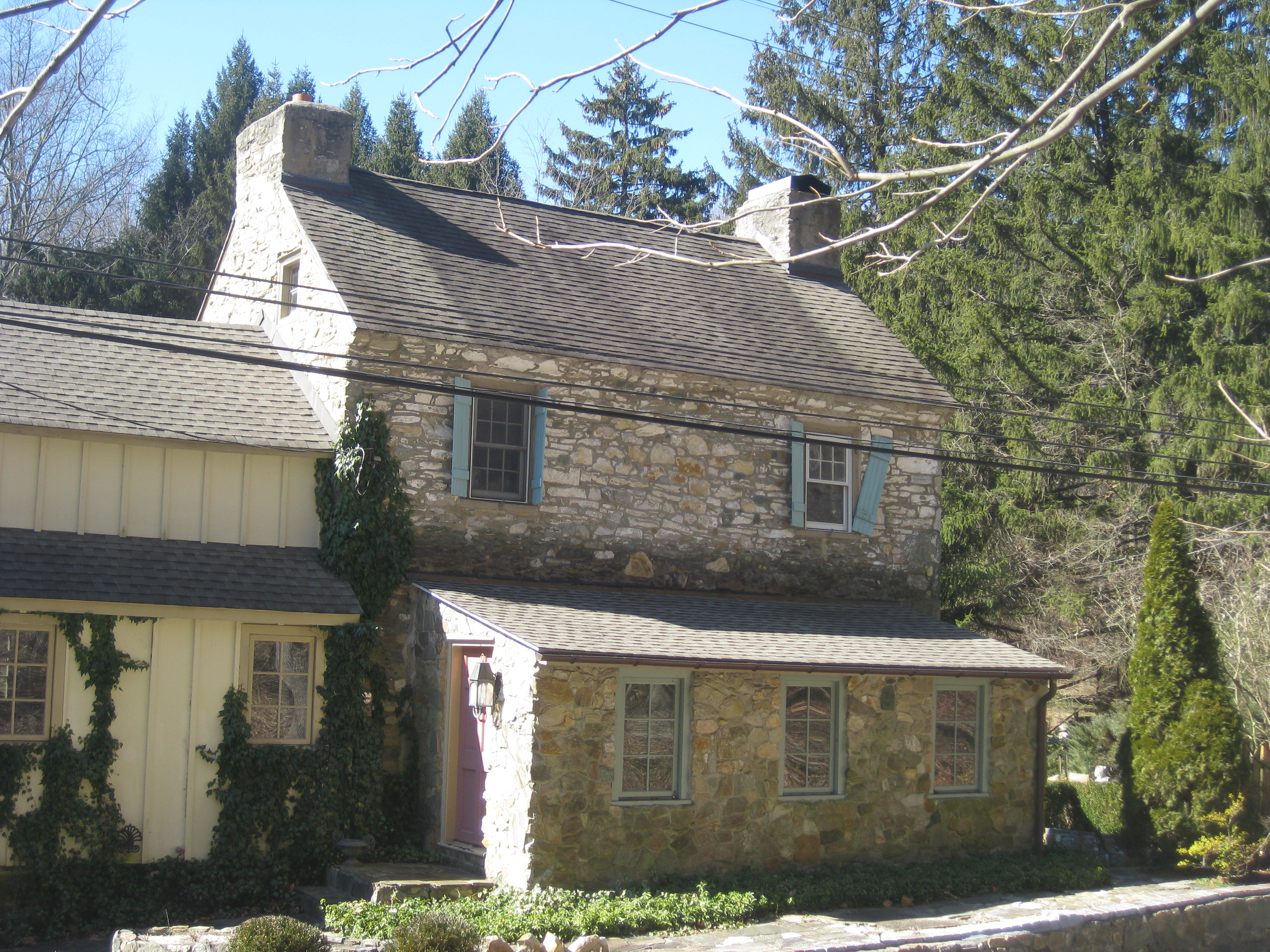
- Hayes Mill House, February 2012

- Location within Pennsylvania Location within the United States
- Location: Star Gazer Rd., Newlin Township, Pennsylvania
- Coordinates: 39°56′23″N 75°44′1″W
- Area: 0.8 acres (0.32 ha)
- Built: c. 1780
- Built by: Mordecai Hayes
- Architectural style: Vernacular Colonial
- MPS: West Branch Brandywine Creek MRA
- NRHP reference No.: 85002358
- Added to NRHP: September 16, 1985

The Hayes Mill House is an historic home that is located in Newlin Township, Chester County, Pennsylvania, United States.

It was added to the National Register of Historic Places in 1985.

== History and architectural features ==
This historic structure is located nearly opposite the Star Gazers' Stone. It was built circa 1780, and is a two-story, three-bay, single-pile, stone dwelling with a gable roof. It has a two-story frame wing. The main section features a corbeled stone cornice.
