= Embreeville Historic District =

Historic district in Pennsylvania, United States

- U.S. National Register of Historic Places
- U.S. Historic district
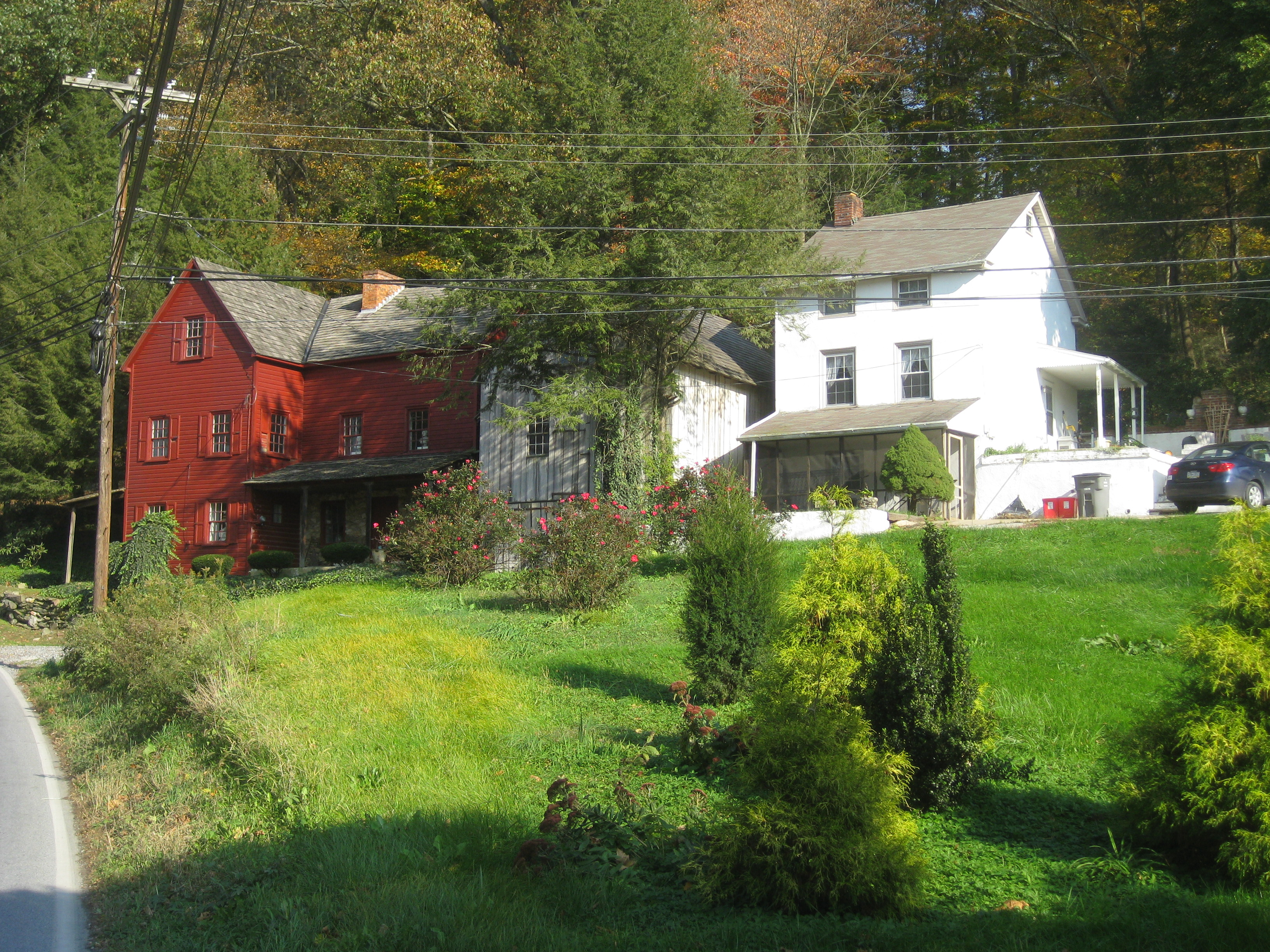
- Embreeville Historic District, October 2011

- Location within Pennsylvania Location within the United States
- Location: Rt. 162, Newlin Township, Pennsylvania
- Coordinates: 39°53′42″N 75°44′09″W
- Area: 65 acres (26 ha)
- Architect: Multiple
- MPS: West Branch Brandywine Creek MRA
- NRHP reference No.: 85002350
- Added to NRHP: September 16, 1985

Embreeville Historic District is a national historic district located in Newlin Township, Chester County, Pennsylvania. It encompasses 12 contributing buildings along the east and west banks of the West Branch Brandywine Creek in the village of Embreeville. It includes a variety of vernacular, banked, stuccoed stone buildings. They were largely built between about 1822 and 1842, with the earliest house built about 1760. The buildings include a farmhouse, a country store, a storekeeper's house, a blacksmith's house, a wheelwright's house and store, a grist mill known as the Embreeville Mill, a "mansion" (1856), and miller's house.

It was added to the National Register of Historic Places in 1985.

== Gallery ==
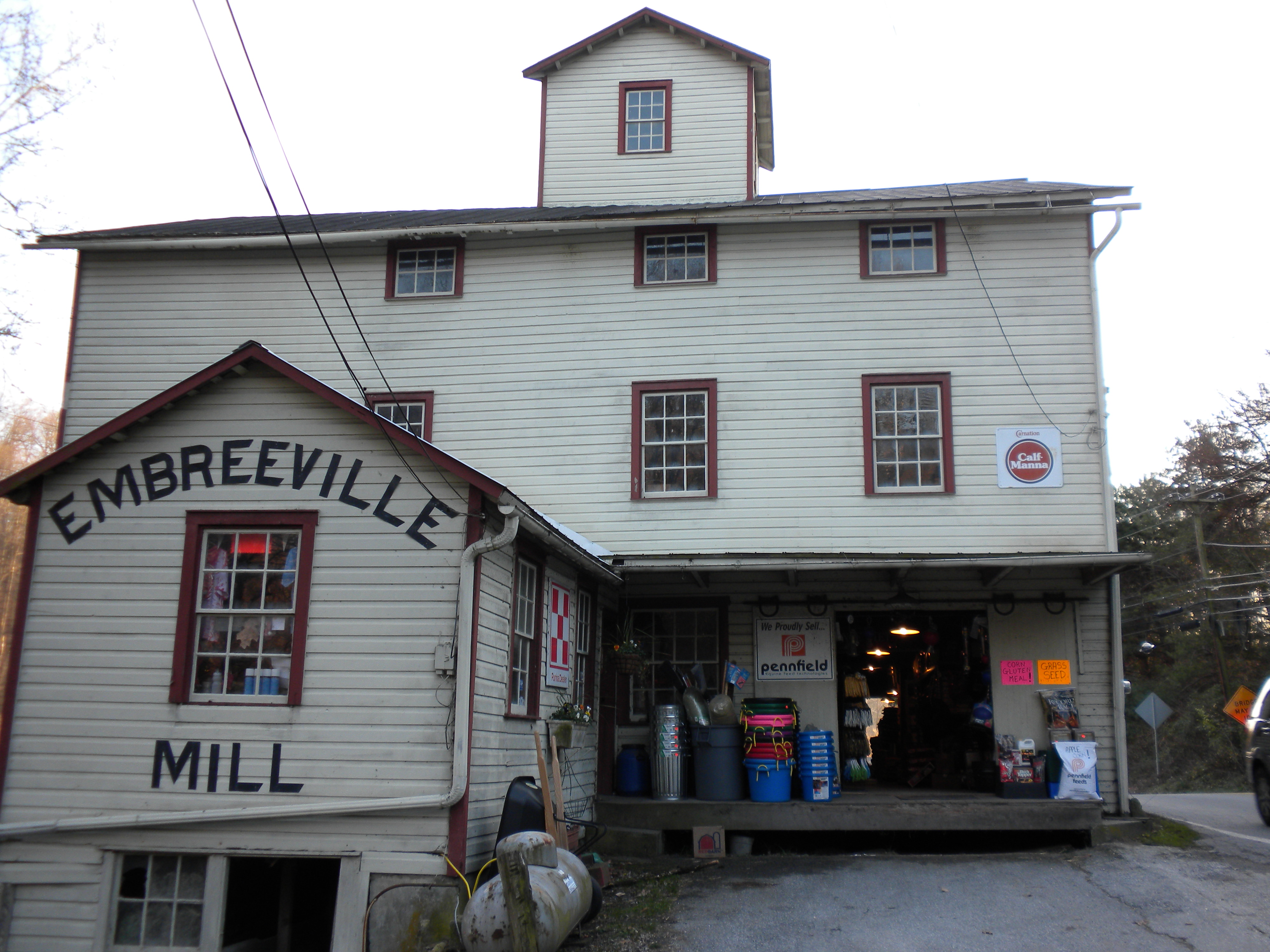
Embreeville Mill, December 2009

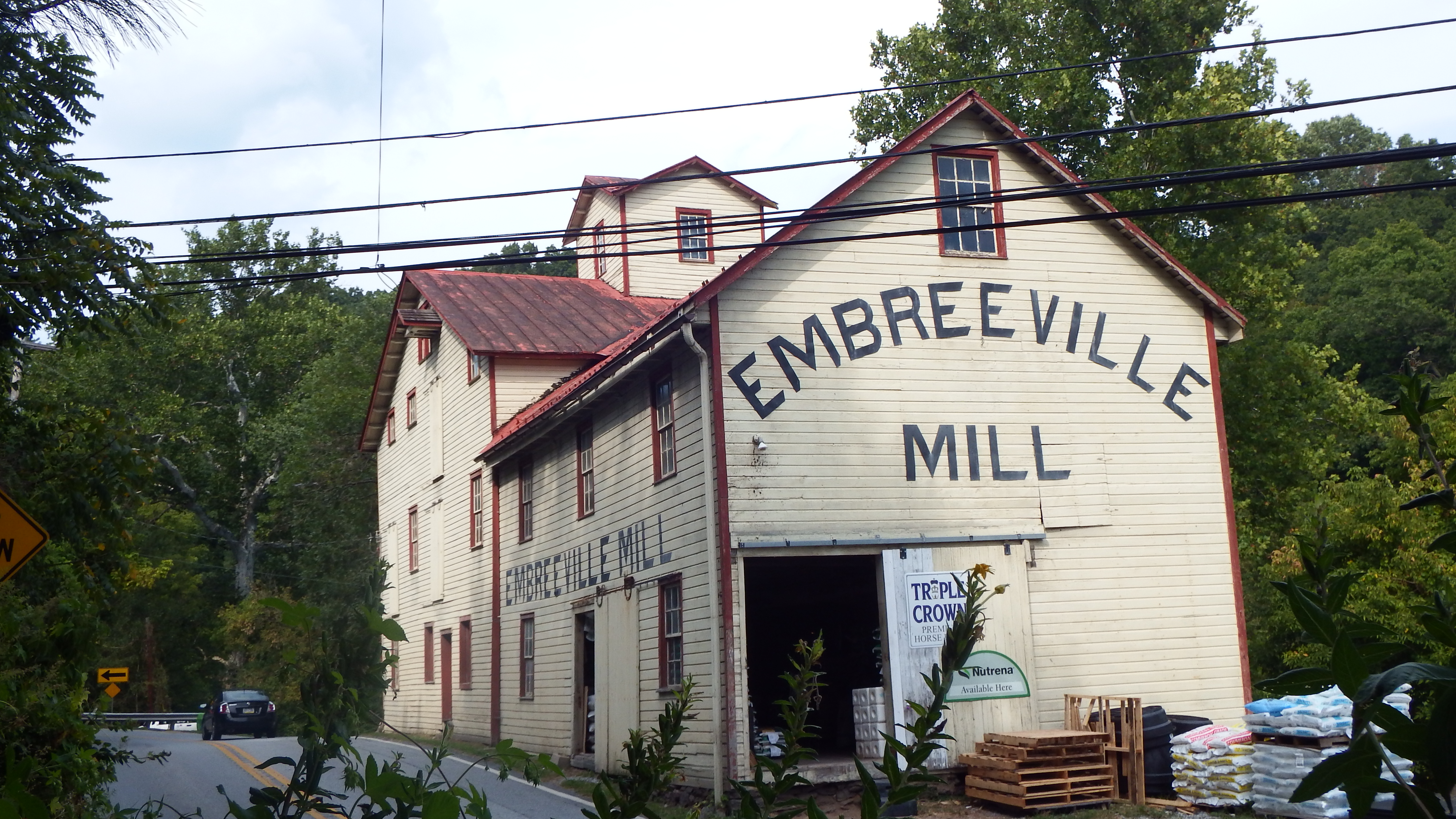
<Embreeville Mill, 2016>
