= Star Gazers' Stone =

- Harlan House
- U.S. National Register of Historic Places
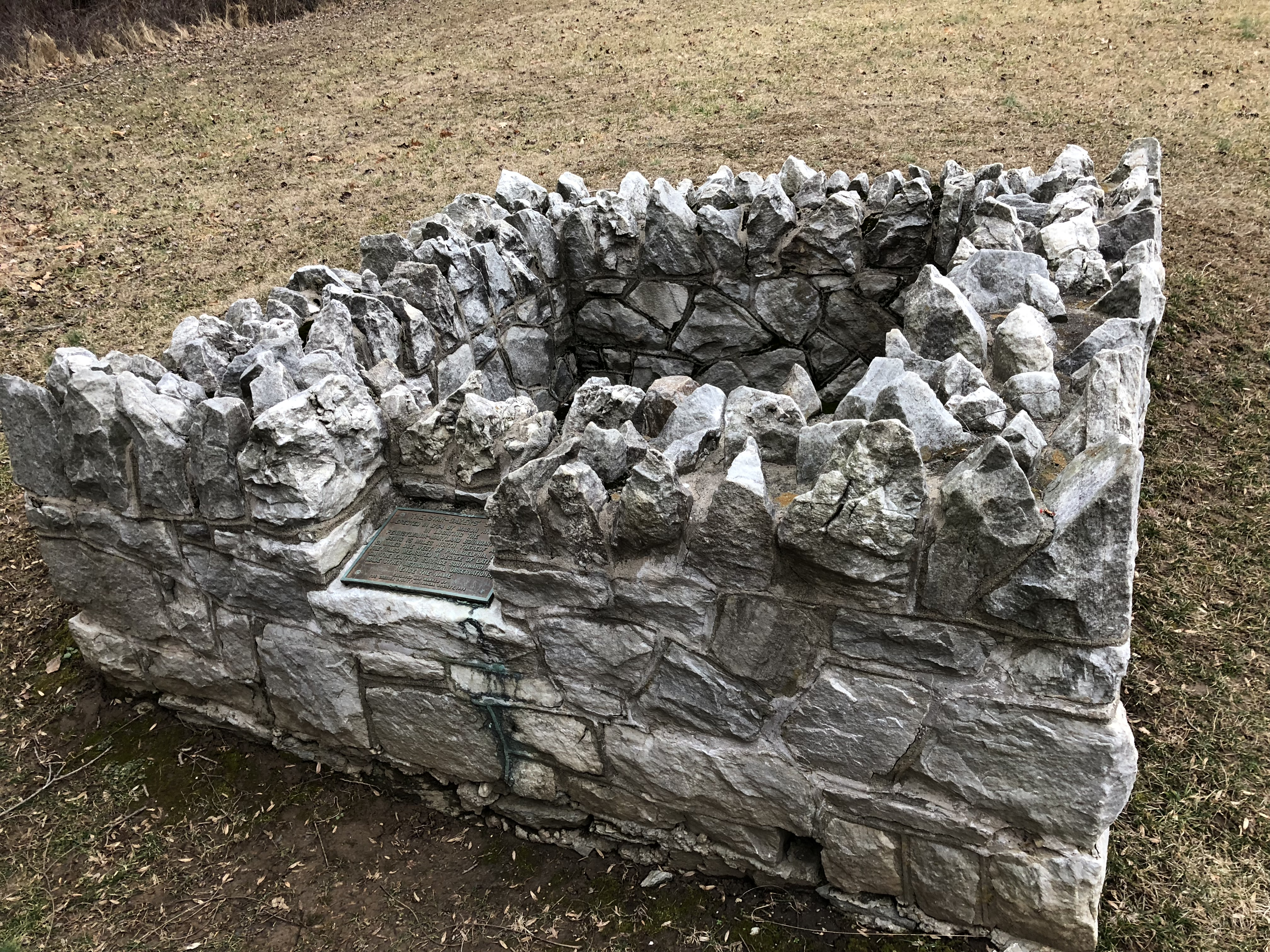
- Star Gazers' Stone

- Location within Pennsylvania Location within the United States
- Location: Embreeville, Pennsylvania, Rt. 162 at Star Gazer Road
- Coordinates: 39.9392°N 75.73245°W
- Built: 1724
- NRHP reference No.: 85001004

Star Gazers' Stone located on Star Gazers' Farm near Embreeville, Pennsylvania, United States, marks the site of a temporary observatory established in January 1764 by Charles Mason and Jeremiah Dixon which they used in their survey of the Mason–Dixon line. The stone was placed by Mason and Dixon about 700 feet (213 m) north of the Harlan House, which was used as a base of operations by Mason and Dixon through the four-and-a-half-year-long survey. Selected to be about 31 miles (50 km) west of the then southernmost point in Philadelphia, the observatory was used to determine the precise latitude of its location. The latitude of the Maryland-Pennsylvania border was then set to be 15 miles (24.1 km) south of the point in Philadelphia. The farm, including the house and stone, were listed on the National Register of Historic Places on May 9, 1985. In 2013 construction was completed on a parking area to allow public access to Star Gazers Stone.

Built c. 1724 near the forks of the Brandywine, the Harlan House was enlarged c.1758, and is likely the first house built in Newlin Township. The Harlan family lived in the house until 1956, and carefully preserved the location of the stone through the generations.

== The observatory ==
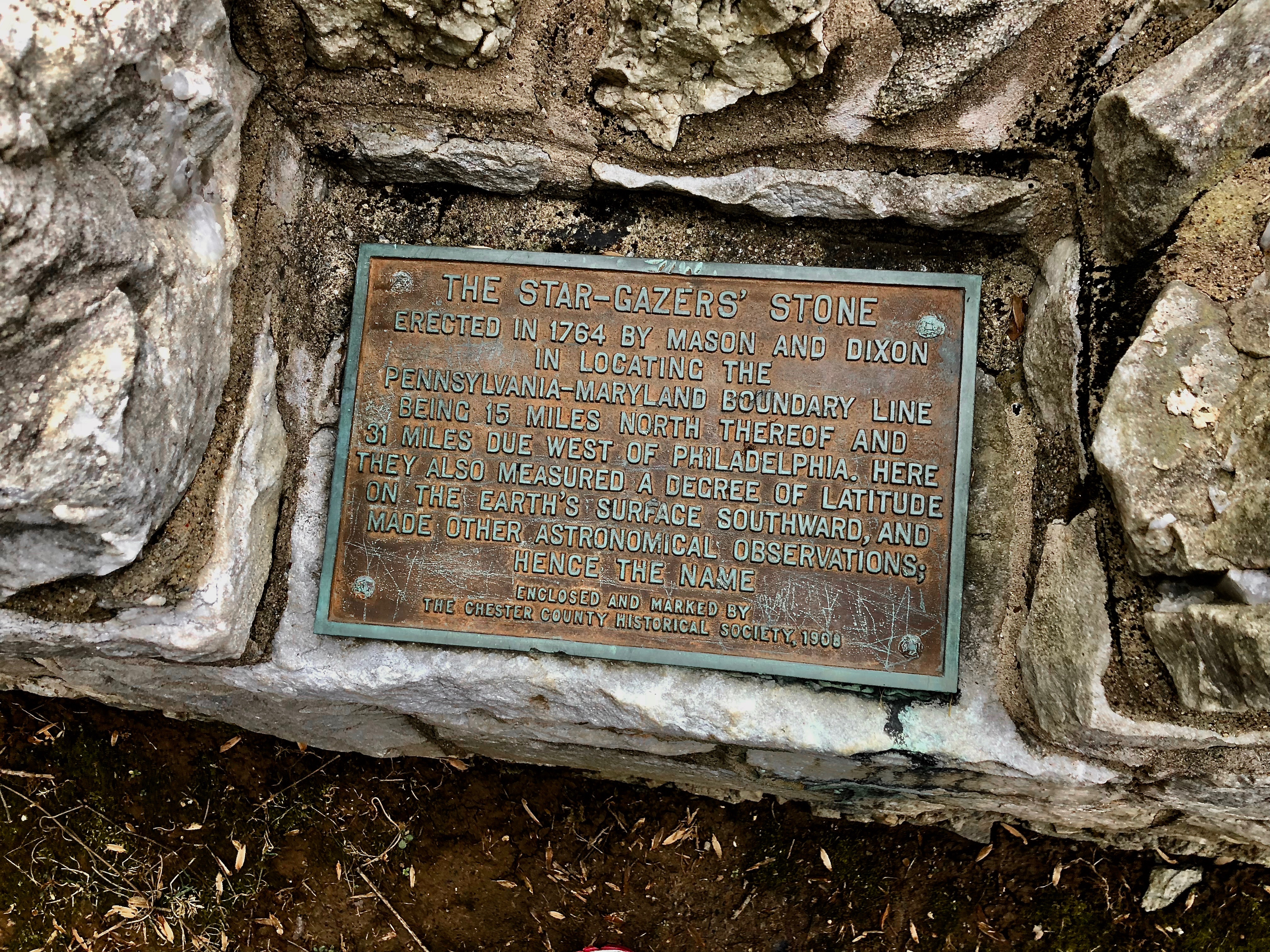
Plaque on the Star Gazers' Stone near Embreeville, PA.

Mason and Dixon's survey was the final step in the resolution of a border dispute between Pennsylvania and Maryland that lasted over 80 years. From 1730–1738 a violent border conflict, known as Cresap's War, was fought between Pennsylvania and Maryland. In 1760 the Crown intervened, defining the border as the line of latitude 15 miles (24.1 km) south of the southernmost house in Philadelphia. The proprietors of the colonies, the Penns and Calverts, then commissioned Mason and Dixon to survey the newly established boundary.

Mason and Dixon used the finest instruments of their day in the survey, including a type of telescope, the zenith sector built by John Bird, used for measuring latitude and an "equal altitude and transit" instrument for sighting survey lines, as well as a less accurate quadrant for faster rough estimates of latitude, and a chronometer built by John Harrison, used for measuring longitude. Though Harrison's chronometers later became the standard instrument for measuring longitude, the surveyors' job was mainly to measure latitude, and Mason preferred the method of lunar distance of measuring longitude to the new method.

On December 9, 1763 soon after arriving in Philadelphia, the surveyors received their instructions from the joint border commission:

1st to settle the Latitude of the southernmost point of the City of Philadelphia by the Sector.

2nd to find a point by the Sector, 30 or 35 miles west from this Place, having the same latitude as the southernmost point of this City.

3rd from this Point so found to measure horizontally due South, which done to observe the Latitude of the South End of the said line by the Sector, and to proceed to run the Parallel of Latitude thru this last Point, which is to be the North Boundary of Maryland and the South Boundary of Pennsylvania.

The first instruction was completed by January 6, 1764 by constructing an observatory near the Huddle-Plumstead House on Cedar Street (now named South Street) in Philadelphia, and measuring the angle of the zenith of eight stars. Rather than measure 15 miles (24 km) directly south of Philadelphia to start the survey, a westward move was needed to avoid crossing the wide Delaware River twice, and to avoid beginning the survey of the Pennsylvania-Maryland border in New Jersey. The surveyors fulfilled the second instruction by January 13, as recorded in their journal:

January 7 Set out from Philadelphia with a Quadrant to find (nearby) a place in the Forks of Brandywine having the same Parallel as the Southernmost point of the City of Philadelphia.

8 Sun. Fixed on the House of Mr. John Harland's (about 31 miles West of Philadelphia) to bring our Instruments to.
9 Returned to Philadelphia
10 Prepared for moving our Instruments
11 The Observatory taken down and put with the rest of our Instruments into the wagons, except the Telescope, etc., of the Sector which was carried on the Springs (with Feather bed under it) of a single Horse chair.
12 Left Philadelphia and reached Chester

13 Lodged at Esquire Worths Arrived at Mr. Harlands and set up the sector in his Garden (inclosed in a tent), and in the Evening brought the Instrument into the Meridian, and took the following observations

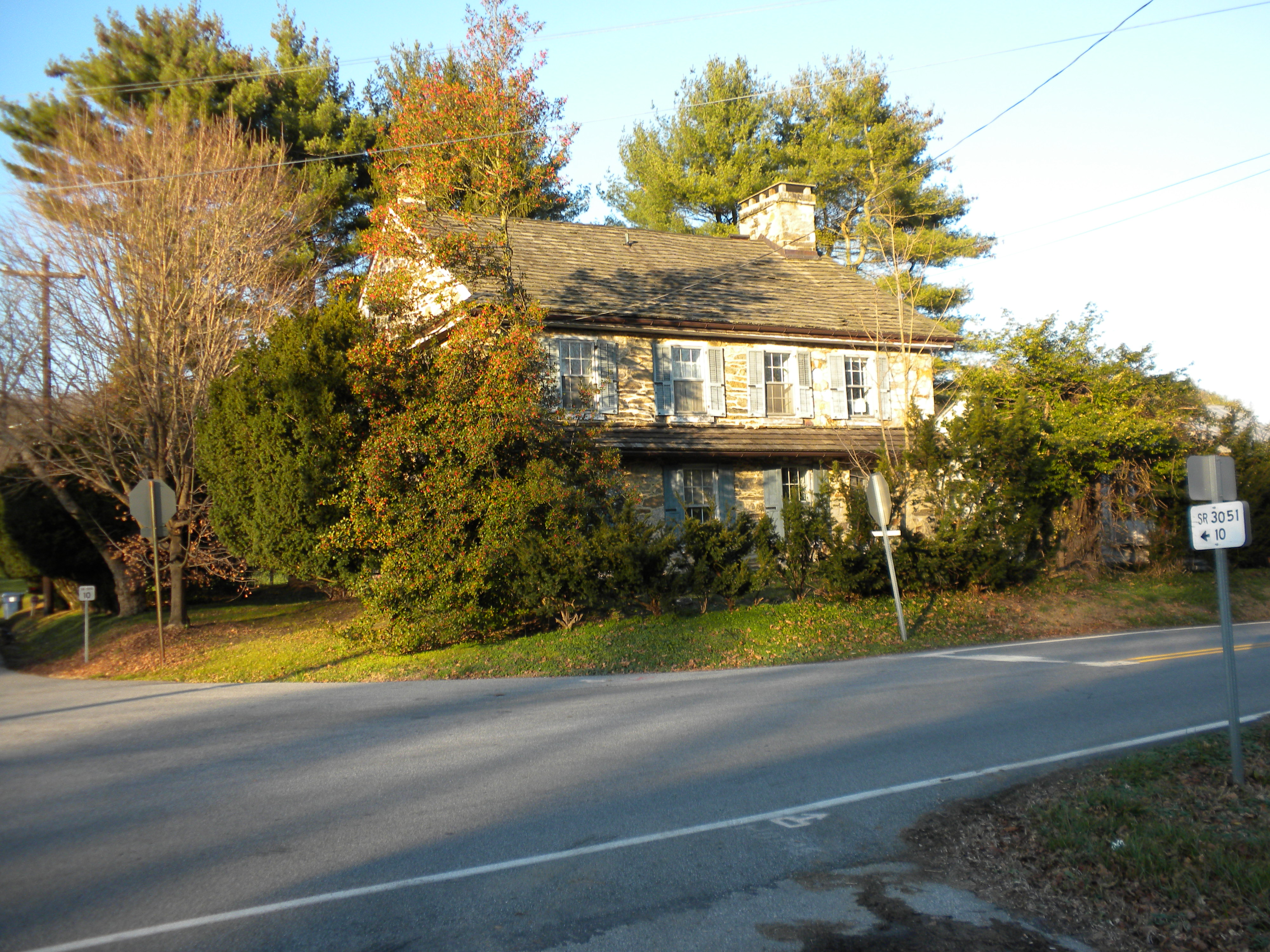
The Harlan House, built 1724

The new site of the observatory was near marks that had been made by surveyors from New Jersey in 1730 and 1736. By February 28 Mason and Dixon had determined the latitude at Star Gazers' Stone by observing the eight stars. After making adjustments for the distance their observatory was south of Philadelphia, Mason and Dixon measured 15 miles (24.1 km) south to a point in Delaware by April 21. They moved the observatory to this point where they measured the latitude again and remeasured back to the Star Gazers' Stone. In May and June they again measured the latitude at Star Gazers' Stone. The southern point was named the "Post mark'd west" and the Maryland-Pennsylvania border was, after a delay, measured straight west from there.

Mason and Dixon returned to the house many times during the four and one-half years of the survey, often spending the winters there. On January 1, 1767, Mason recorded a temperature of minus 22 degrees Fahrenheit at the farm. They returned to the observatory when they started the new task of measuring the distance of a degree of latitude in miles. They were reputed to be heavy drinkers, and local lore says that a nearby tributary of the Brandywine, Punch Run Creek, was named to commemorate their drinking. At the end of the survey, the Harlan house was one of the last places they visited before returning to Britain via Philadelphia.

== The Harlan house and farm ==
Brothers George and Michael Harlan were Quakers who were born in Durham, England, and immigrated to Pennsylvania about 1687 from County Down, Ireland. Michael's son George Harlan built the house in the forks of the Brandywine c.1724. In that year the Free Society of Traders sold 7,000 acres (28 km^{2}) to Nathaniel Newlin, which became Newlin Township in Chester County. Newlin immediately sold some of the land, including 169 acres (0.68 km^{2}) in the forks of Brandywine Creek sold to George Harlan. A son, Joel, was born to George and Mary Harlan in 1724 in Newlin Township, presumably in their new house. The house was probably the first in the township. Tax assessments in the township were first made in 1739, and until 1760, Joel's older brother John Harlan paid the taxes on the house and farm. Sometime between 1758 and 1760 Joel returned to Newlin Township after living in other locations in Chester County, took ownership of the farm and built an addition to the house. Both John's and Joel's families apparently lived in the same house, but Mason and Dixon's Journal always refers to the "John Harland farm" or simply the "Harland farm." John Harlan died by drowning in the Brandywine in 1768. The original house is two stories measuring 25 feet (7.6 m) by 16 feet (4.9 m), constructed of stone. The c.1758 addition was also constructed of stone and measures 25 feet (7.6 m) by 13 feet (4.0 m). A small frame addition was built in the nineteenth century.

The Harlan family lived on site until they sold the property in 1956. In 1908 the Chester County Historical Society dug up the Star Gazers' Stone, set it in concrete, built a low stone wall around it, and placed a plaque on the new wall. At the dedication, Henry K. Harlan said that each generation of the family was taught that the Star Gazers' Stone had an important place in American history and that they should not move the stone. Natural Lands, the region's foremost land conservation organization, now owns the stone as part of ChesLen Preserve, which is open to the public.

Joshua Harlan, son of the immigrant George Harlan, built a log cabin known as the Harlan Log House about 1715, about 12 miles (19 km) south in Kennett Township which is also listed on the National Register of Historic Places.

== See also ==
- Josiah Harlan - Joel's grandson
- Mason and Dixon Survey Terminal Point
- Natural Lands
- Penn–Calvert boundary dispute
- White Clay Creek State Park, site of "Post mark'd west"

== Sources ==
- Danson, Edwin (2001). Drawing the Line: How Mason and Dixon Surveyed the Most Famous Border in America. John Wiley and Sons. p. 232. ISBN 978-0-471-43704-8.
- Ecenbarger, William (2000). Walkin' the line: a journey from past to present along the Mason-Dixon. M. Evans. p. 222. ISBN 978-0-87131-910-4.
- Futhey, John Smith; Cope, Gilbert (1881). History of Chester County, Pennsylvania, with genealogical and biographical sketches. Philadelphia: L.H. Everts. p. 1162. p. 158
- MacElree, Wilmer W. (1912). Along the Western Brandywine. West Chester, Pennsylvania: F. S. Hickman., Chapter: John Russell Hayes - Star Gazers' Stone, pp 93–101. OCLC 1359347
