= Ward-Hays House =

Historic house in Arkansas, United States

- U.S. National Register of Historic Places
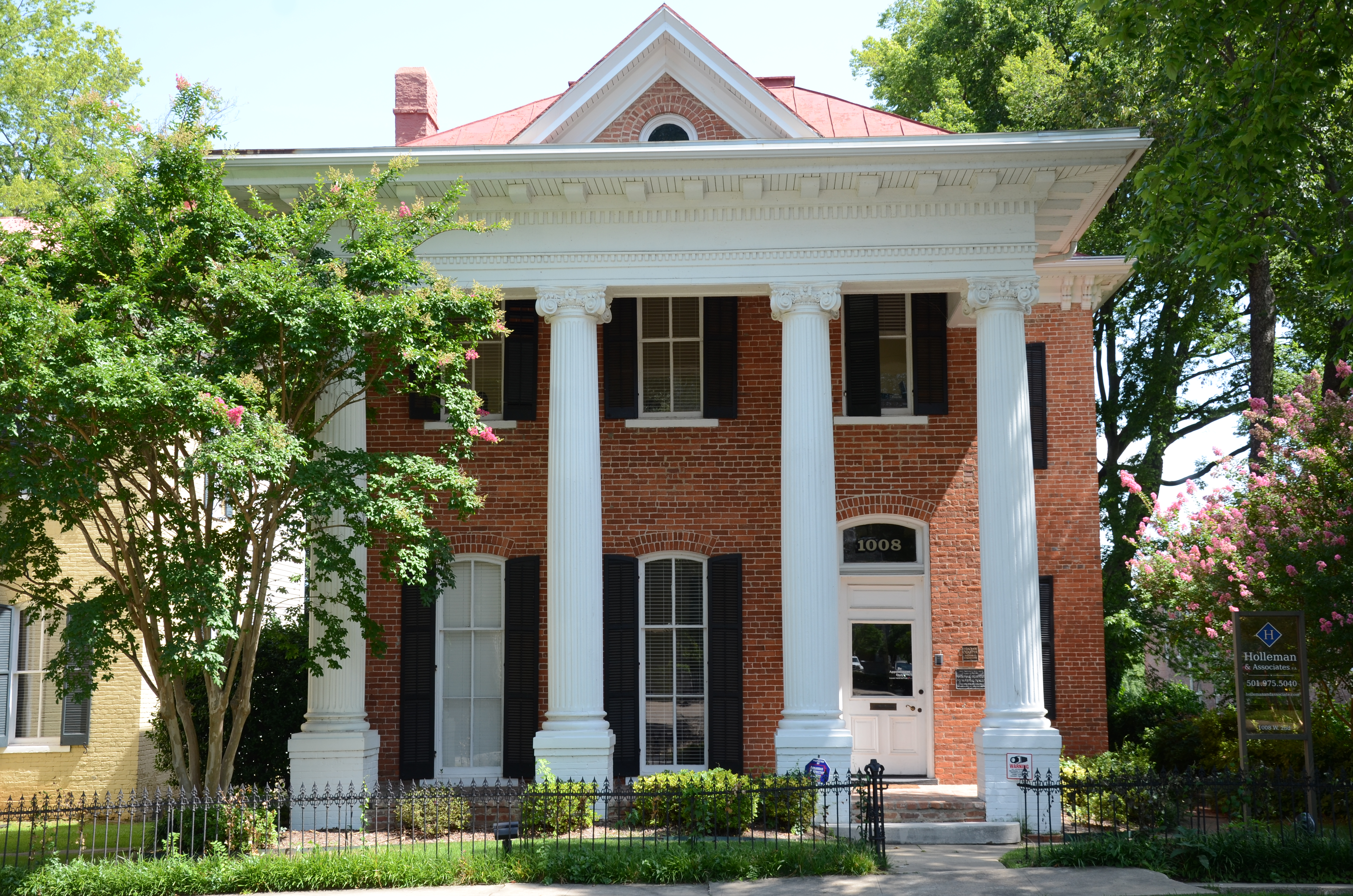

- Location within Arkansas Location within the United States
- Location: 1008 W. 2nd St., Little Rock, Arkansas
- Coordinates: 34°44′56″N 92°16′54″W
- Area: less than one acre
- Built: 1886
- Architect: Zeb Ward
- NRHP reference No.: 75000412
- Added to NRHP: August 11, 1975

The Ward-Hays House is a historic house at 1008 West 2nd Street in Little Rock, Arkansas. It is a two-story brick building, distinguished by a massive front portico, with two-story fluted Ionic columns supporting an elaborate entablature and cornice. The house was built in 1886 for the son of Zeb Ward by prison labor provided by the Arkansas State Penitentiary, which Ward headed at the time. Its second owner was John Quitman Hays, a prominent railroad engineer.

The house was listed on the National Register of Historic Places in 1975.

== See also ==
- National Register of Historic Places listings in Little Rock, Arkansas
