= Jarrett-Hayes House =

Historic house in Georgia, US

- U.S. National Register of Historic Places
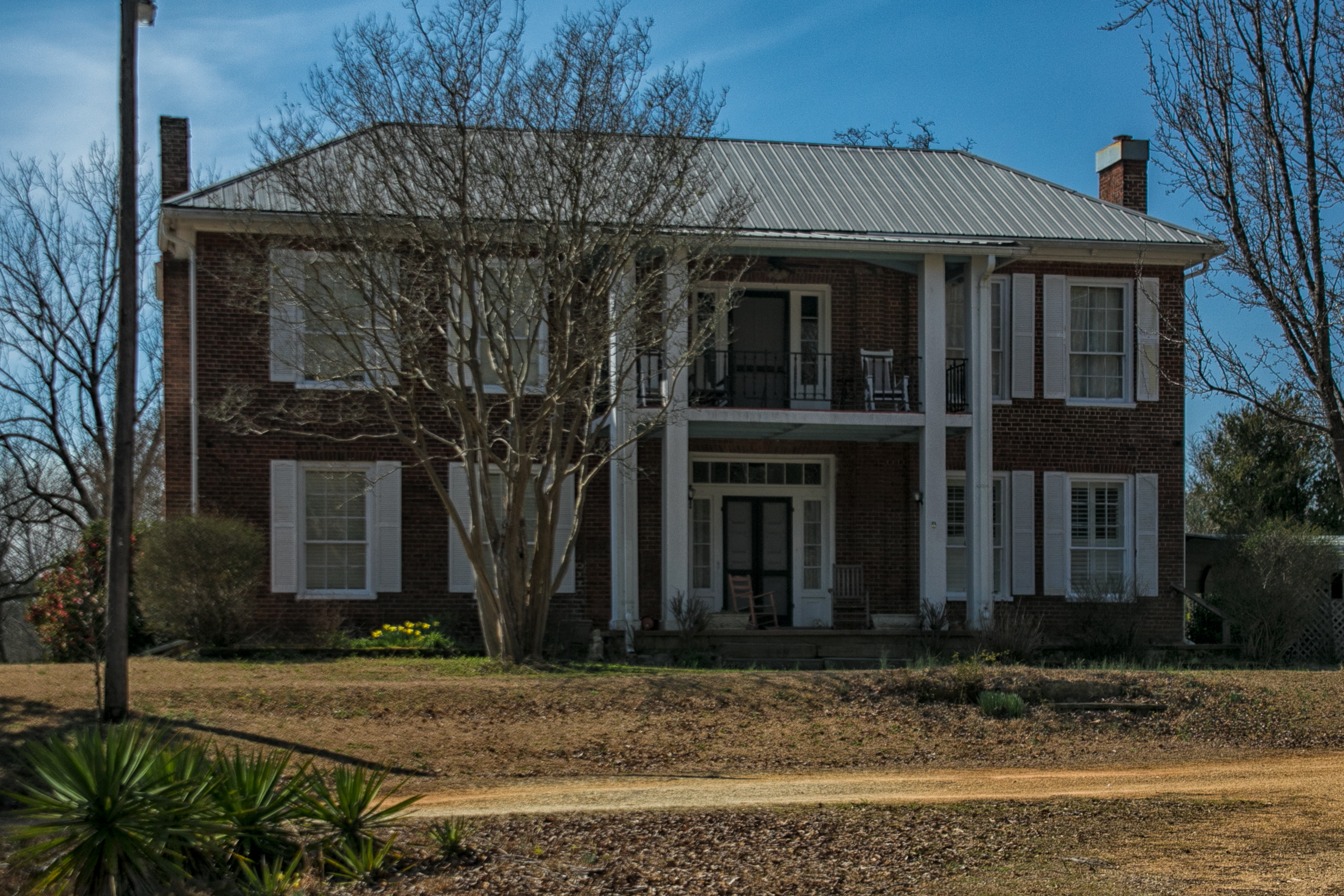

- Location within Georgia
- Nearest city: Toccoa, Georgia
- Coordinates: 34°37′42″N 83°15′32″W
- Area: 20 acres (8.1 ha)
- Built: c.1848
- Built by: Robert Jarrett
- Architectural style: I-house
- NRHP reference No.: 94000572
- Added to NRHP: June 10, 1994

The Jarrett-Hayes House, also known as Liberty Lodge, in Stephens County, Georgia near Toccoa, is an I-house built around 1848. It was listed on the National Register of Historic Places in 1994.

It is a two-story plantation house built by slave labor, including for the making, on the property, of bricks used in its construction.

It is located on the northeastern side of County Route 3, about 2 miles east of its junction with Georgia State Route 184.
