= Hayes Homestead =

Historic house in Pennsylvania, United States

- U.S. National Register of Historic Places
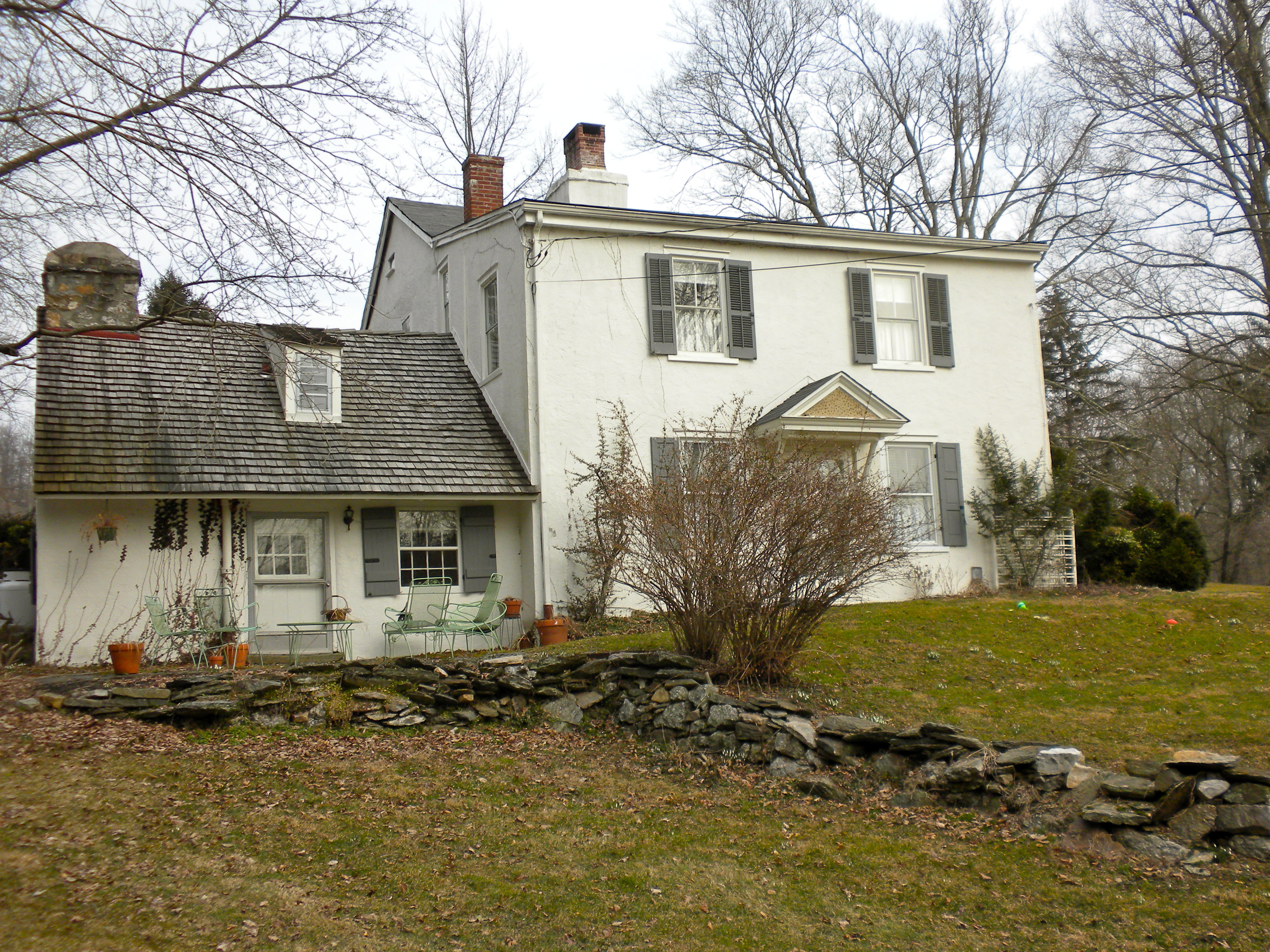
- Hayes Homestead, March 2010

- Location within Pennsylvania Location within the United States
- Location: Rt. 162 & Harvey's Bridge Rd., Newlin Township, Pennsylvania
- Coordinates: 39°56′9″N 75°44′10″W
- Area: 7.3 acres (3.0 ha)
- Built: c. 1770
- Built by: Thomas Hayes
- Architectural style: German Colonial
- MPS: West Branch Brandywine Creek MRA
- NRHP reference No.: 85002355
- Added to NRHP: September 16, 1985

Hayes Homestead, also known as Green Lawn Farm, is an historic home that is located in Newlin Township, Chester County, Pennsylvania, United States.

It was added to the National Register of Historic Places in 1985.

== History and architectural features ==
The original section of this historic structure was built circa 1770, with a 1 1/2-story stone kitchen wing added circa 1799, and a two-story frame addition erected in 1882. The original section is a two-story log structure with full basement and attic. It has a gable roof and mammoth central stone chimney.
