= Newlin Township, Pennsylvania =

Township in Pennsylvania, US

Newlin Township
- Township
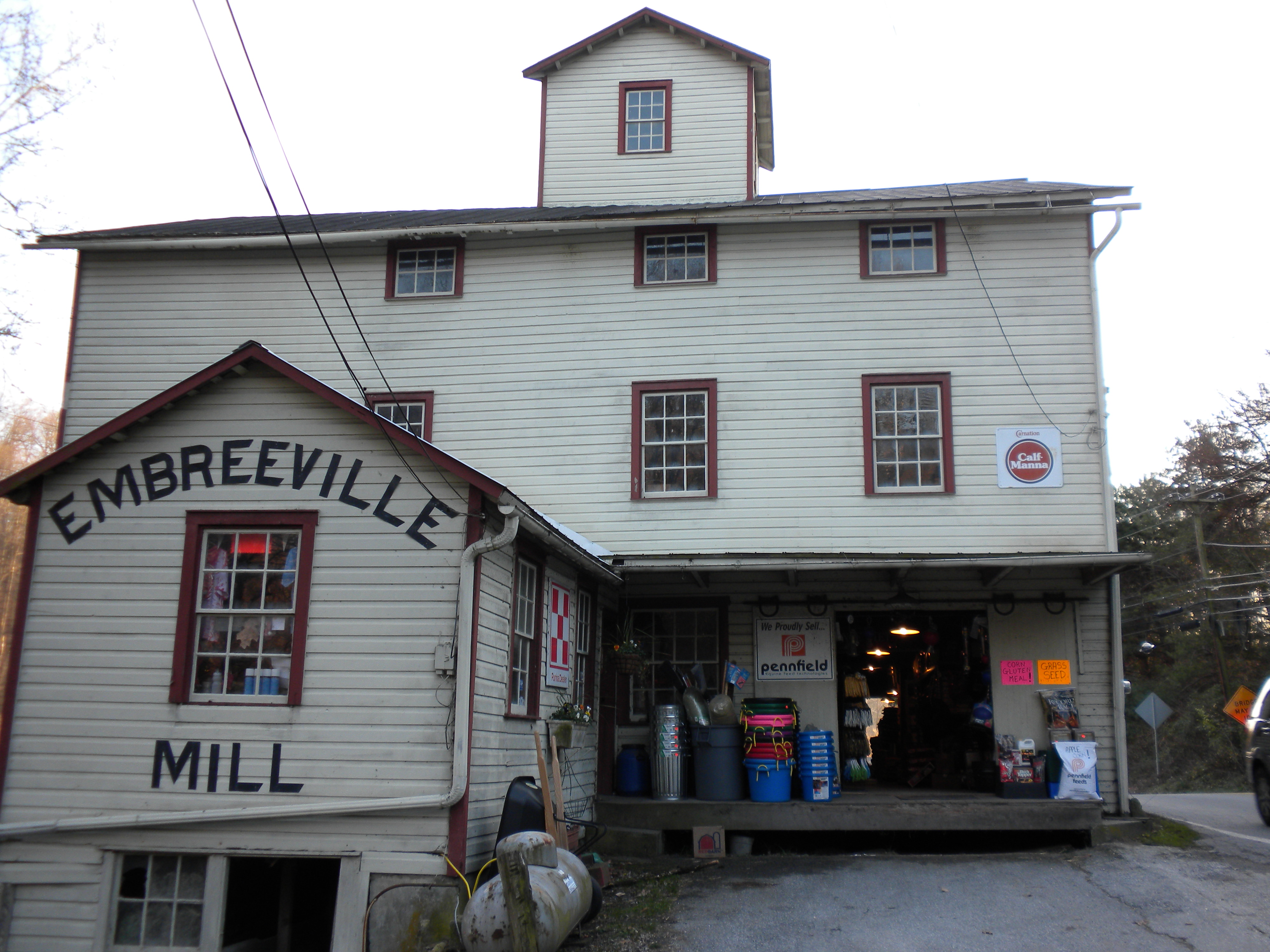

- Location in Chester County and the state of Pennsylvania.

- Location of Pennsylvania in the United States
- Coordinates: 39°55′49″N 75°44′25″W
- Country: United States
- State: Pennsylvania
- County: Chester

Area
  - Total: 12.12 sq mi (31.39 km^{2})
  - Land: 11.98 sq mi (31.02 km^{2})
  - Water: 0.15 sq mi (0.38 km^{2})
- Elevation: 220 ft (67 m)

Population (2010)
  - Total: 1,285
  - Estimate (2016): 1,351
  - Density: 112.8/sq mi (43.56/km^{2})
- Time zone: UTC-5 (EST)
  - Summer (DST): UTC-4 (EDT)
- Area code: 610
- FIPS code: 42-029-53784
- Website: http://www.newlintownship.org/

Newlin Township is a township in Chester County, Pennsylvania, United States. The population was 1,285 at the 2010 census.

Newlin Township was the hometown of explorer Josiah Harlan and Lenape healer Hannah Freeman. Physician and Civil War nurse Hettie Kersey Painter grew up in Newlin. William Baldwin, the botanist, was born there on March 29, 1779.

== History ==
The township was named for Nicholas Newlin (1630–1699), who received a deed from William Penn. In 1704, his son Nathaniel (1663–1729) and his wife Mary built a water-powered gristmill along the West Branch of Chester Creek. The Newlin Grist Mill is located in Glen Mills, now in Delaware County.

The Embreeville Historic District, Green Valley Historic District, Harlan House, Hayes Homestead, Hayes Mill House, Jacob Hayes House, House at Upper Laurel Iron Works, Indian Deep Farm, Marlborough Village Historic District, Mountain Meadow Farm, Northbrook Historic District, Spruce Grove School, and Joseph Young House are listed on the National Register of Historic Places.

== Geography ==
According to the United States Census Bureau, the township has a total area of 12.0 square miles (31 km^{2}), of which 0.04 square miles (0.10 km^{2}), or 0.25%, is water.

== Demographics ==
At the 2010 census, the township was 95.0% non-Hispanic White, 0.6% Black or African American, 0.9% Asian, and 0.6% were two or more races. 2.9% of the population were of Hispanic or Latino ancestry.

As of the census of 2000, there were 1,150 people, 429 households, and 335 families living in the township. The population density was 96.0 inhabitants per square mile (37.1/km^{2}). There were 446 housing units at an average density of 37.2 per square mile (14.4/km^{2}). The racial makeup of the township was 97.04% White, 0.78% African American, 0.43% Asian, 0.17% Pacific Islander, 0.70% from other races, and 0.87% from two or more races. Hispanic or Latino of any race were 2.00% of the population.

Historical population
Census	Pop.	Note	%±
1930	579		—
1940	984		69.9%
1950	957		−2.7%
1960	1,477		54.3%
1970	1,464		−0.9%
1980	725		−50.5%
1990	1,092		50.6%
2000	1,150		5.3%
2010	1,285		11.7%
2020	1,358		5.7%

There were 429 households, out of which 33.8% had children under the age of 18 living with them, 69.9% were married couples living together, 5.6% had a female householder with no husband present, and 21.9% were non-families. 15.4% of all households were made up of individuals, and 3.3% had someone living alone who was 65 years of age or older. The average household size was 2.68 and the average family size was 3.00.

In the township the population was spread out, with 23.1% under the age of 18, 5.3% from 18 to 24, 27.5% from 25 to 44, 33.5% from 45 to 64, and 10.6% who were 65 years of age or older. The median age was 42 years. For every 100 females, there were 102.1 males. For every 100 females age 18 and over, there were 104.2 males.

The median income for a household in the township was $68,828, and the median income for a family was $75,241. Males had a median income of $48,250 versus $37,885 for females. The per capita income for the township was $36,804. About 2.4% of families and 3.5% of the population were below the poverty line, including 0.7% of those under age 18 and 5.0% of those age 65 or over.

== Education ==
Newlin Township lies within the Unionville-Chadds Ford School District

== Transportation ==
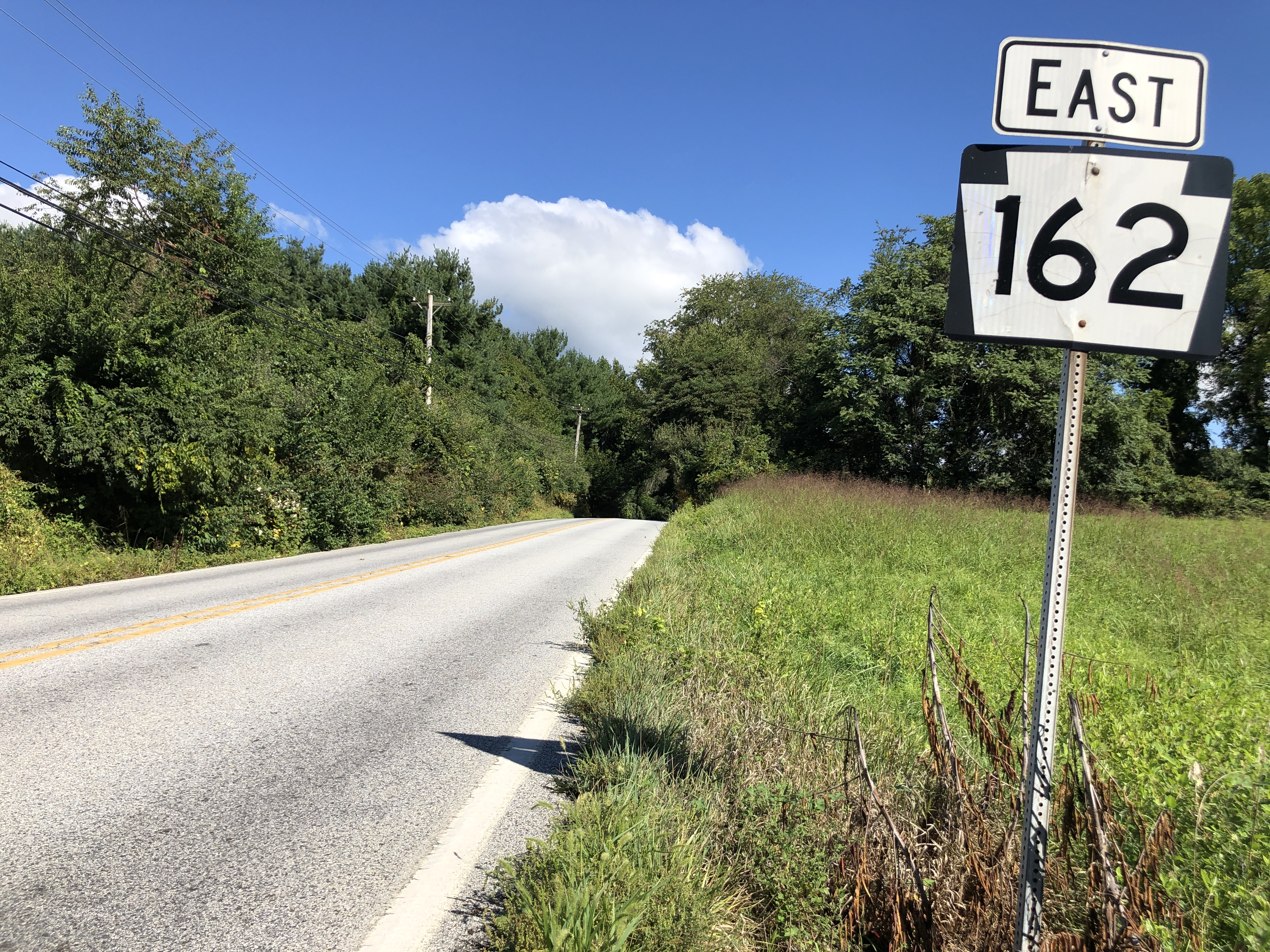
PA 162 eastbound in Newlin Township

As of 2019, there were 31.51 miles (50.71 km) of public roads in Newlin Township, of which 12.79 miles (20.58 km) were maintained by the Pennsylvania Department of Transportation (PennDOT) and 18.72 miles (30.13 km) were maintained by the township.

Pennsylvania Route 162 and Pennsylvania Route 842 are the numbered highways serving Newlin Township. PA 162 follows Embreeville Road along a north–south alignment through the middle of the township. PA 842 follows Unionville Wawaset Road along a southwest–northeast alignment through the southeastern part of the township.
