= National Register of Historic Places listings in southern Chester County, Pennsylvania =

Location of Chester County in Pennsylvania

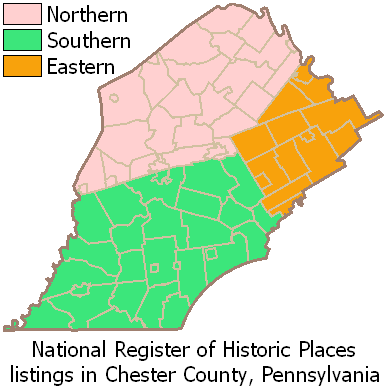
Map of Chester County (clickable)

This is a list of the National Register of Historic Places listings in southern Chester County, Pennsylvania.

This is intended to be a complete list of the properties and districts on the National Register of Historic Places in southern Chester County, Pennsylvania. Southern Chester County is defined as being the municipalities south of the Philadelphia Main Line and west of West Chester. The locations of National Register properties and districts, for which the latitude and longitude coordinates are included below, may be seen in a map.

There are 324 properties and districts listed on the Register in Chester County, including 7 National Historic Landmarks. Southern Chester County includes 123 properties and districts, including 2 National Historic Landmarks; the county's remaining properties and districts are listed elsewhere.

This National Park Service list is complete through NPS recent listings posted May 1, 2026.

== Current listings ==
	Name on the Register	Image	Date listed	Location	Municipality	Description
1	John Bailey Farm	John Bailey Farm	May 20, 1985 (#85001143)	Springdell Road near Coatesville; 39°55′41″N 75°50′28″W	East Fallowfield Township	
2	Baily Farm	Baily Farm	September 16, 1985 (#85002347)	Strasburg and Broad Run Roads; 39°56′55″N 75°42′11″W	West Bradford Township	
3	Barns-Brinton House	Barns-Brinton House	May 27, 1971 (#71000692)	East of Hamorton on U.S. Route 1; 39°52′24″N 75°37′35″W	Pennsbury Township	
4	Birmingham Friends Meetinghouse and School	Birmingham Friends Meetinghouse and School	July 27, 1971 (#71000688)	1245 Birmingham Road; 39°54′20″N 75°35′42″W	Birmingham Township	
5	Bradford Friends Meetinghouse	Bradford Friends Meetinghouse	July 27, 1971 (#71000694)	Eastern side of Northbrook Road in Marshallton; 39°56′54″N 75°40′47″W	West Bradford Township	
6	Brandywine Building and Loan Assoc. Rowhouses	Brandywine Building and Loan Assoc. Rowhouses	May 20, 1985 (#85001144)	Hephzibah Hill Road near Coatesville; 39°57′13″N 75°48′24″W	East Fallowfield Township	
7	Bridge in East Fallowfield Township	Bridge in East Fallowfield Township	June 22, 1988 (#88000878)	Strasburg Road over Mill Race near Mortonville; 39°56′46″N 75°46′43″W	East Fallowfield Township	
8	Bridge in West Fallowfield Township	Bridge in West Fallowfield Township	June 22, 1988 (#88000849)	Ross Fording Road over Octoraro Creek, near Steelville; 39°52′58″N 75°59′31″W	West Fallowfield Township	
9	Brinton's Mill	Brinton's Mill	May 27, 1971 (#71000689)	North of Chadds Ford on Creek Road; 39°53′07″N 75°36′13″W	Birmingham Township	
10	Edward Brinton House	Edward Brinton House	June 19, 1973 (#73001599)	Northwest of Chadds Ford at 1325 Creek Road; 39°53′17″N 75°36′29″W	Birmingham Township	
11	George Brinton House	George Brinton House	October 25, 1990 (#90001608)	Pennsylvania Route 100, 1 mile north of its junction with U.S. Route 1, near Chadds Ford; 39°52′51″N 75°35′56″W	Birmingham Township	
12	Brinton-King Farmstead	Brinton-King Farmstead	March 21, 2002 (#02000230)	1301 Brinton's Bridge Road, 162 Baltimore Pike; 39°52′29″N 75°37′13″W	Pennsbury Township	
13	Brooklawn	Brooklawn	January 24, 2022 (#100006433)	1825 Newark Rd. 39°53′50″N 75°46′53″W	West Marlborough Township	
14	Carter-Worth House and Farm	Carter-Worth House and Farm	September 15, 1977 (#77001151)	450 Lucky Hill Road near Marshallton; 39°56′43″N 75°40′02″W	East Bradford Township	
15	Cedarcroft	Cedarcroft	November 11, 1971 (#71000693)	North of Kennett Square; 39°51′35″N 75°43′09″W	East Marlborough Township	
16	Chandler Mill Bridge	Chandler Mill Bridge	January 11, 2010 (#09001213)	Chandler Mill Road over West Branch Red Clay Creek; 39°48′41″N 75°42′48″W	Kennett Township	
17	Como Farm	Como Farm	September 16, 1985 (#85002348)	Broad Run Road; 39°57′08″N 75°42′26″W	West Bradford Township	
18	Cope's Bridge	Cope's Bridge	March 7, 1985 (#85000465)	Strasburg Road (Pennsylvania Route 162) west of its junction with Creek Road and east of Marshallton; 39°57′32″N 75°39′19″W	West Bradford Township	
19	Daniel Davis House and Barn	Daniel Davis House and Barn	April 11, 1973 (#73001598)	Birmingham and Street Road; 39°54′47″N 75°36′00″W	Birmingham Township	
20	Delaware Boundary Markers	Delaware Boundary Markers	February 18, 1975 (#75002101)	Boundary line dividing Delaware from Maryland and Pennsylvania	Multiple	Extends into Delaware and eastern Maryland.
21	Harry DeHaven House	Harry DeHaven House	September 18, 1985 (#85002386)	Strasburg Road near Coatesville; 39°57′21″N 75°50′53″W	East Fallowfield Township	
22	Derbydown Homestead	Derbydown Homestead	February 4, 1973 (#73001609)	At the junction of CR 15077 and 15080; 39°55′31″N 75°41′12″W	West Bradford Township	
23	Dilworthtown Historic District	Dilworthtown Historic District	January 18, 1973 (#73001601)	Junction of CR 15199 and 15087; 39°53′57″N 75°34′06″W	Birmingham Township	
24	Doe Run Village Historic District	Doe Run Village Historic District	September 16, 1985 (#85002349)	Highland Dairy, DuPont & Chapel Roads, and Pennsylvania Routes 82 and 841; 39°55′08″N 75°49′04″W	West Marlborough Township	
25	Edward Dougherty House	Edward Dougherty House	May 20, 1985 (#85001145)	Mt. Carmel Road near Coatesville; 39°57′45″N 75°51′43″W	East Fallowfield Township	
26	Philip Dougherty House	Philip Dougherty House	September 18, 1985 (#85002390)	Strasburg Road near Coatesville; 39°57′32″N 75°52′20″W	East Fallowfield Township	
27	Philip Dougherty Tavern	Philip Dougherty Tavern	September 18, 1985 (#85002391)	Strasburg Road near Coatesville; 39°57′40″N 75°51′42″W	East Fallowfield Township	
28	Drovers Inn	Drovers Inn	September 18, 1985 (#85002388)	Strasburg Road near Coatesville; 39°57′14″N 75°50′18″W	East Fallowfield Township	
29	East Bradford Boarding School for Boys	East Bradford Boarding School for Boys	March 7, 1973 (#73001605)	1 mile (1.6 km) east of Lenape at West Chester and Sconnelltown Roads; 39°55′47″N 75°37′07″W	East Bradford Township	
30	Edgewood	Edgewood	March 7, 1973 (#09000102)	Southeast of the junction of County Roads 15087 and 15221, near West Chester; 39°54′08″N 75°35′21″W	Birmingham Township	
31	Embreeville Historic District	Embreeville Historic District	September 16, 1985 (#85002350)	Pennsylvania Route 162; 39°55′35″N 75°43′55″W	Newlin Township	
32	Ercildoun Historic District	Ercildoun Historic District	May 20, 1985 (#85001157)	Pennsylvania Route 82, Township 368, Legislative Route 15236, and Township 371 and 182; 39°56′35″N 75°50′31″W	East Fallowfield Township	
33	Fairville Historic District	Fairville Historic District	November 7, 1996 (#96001200)	Kennett Pike between Fairville Road and Hickory Hill Road; 39°50′52″N 75°38′00″W	Pennsbury Township	
34	John Ferron House	John Ferron House	November 26, 1985 (#85003049)	Saint Malachi Road; 39°53′57″N 75°51′06″W	Londonderry Township	
35	Gibson's Covered Bridge	Gibson's Covered Bridge	December 10, 1980 (#80003456)	Southeast of Downingtown on Township 391; 39°58′34″N 75°41′00″W	East and West Bradford Townships	
36	Joseph Gladden House	Joseph Gladden House	May 20, 1985 (#85001146)	West Chester Road near Coatesville; 39°58′45″N 75°47′29″W	East Fallowfield Township	
37	Glen Hope Covered Bridge	Glen Hope Covered Bridge	December 10, 1980 (#80003472)	West of Lewisville on Township 344, near West Grove; 39°43′37″N 75°54′28″W	Elk Township	
38	Glen Rose Historic District	Glen Rose Historic District	September 18, 1985 (#85002384)	Legislative Route 15178 and Township 371; 39°56′37″N 75°51′33″W	East Fallowfield Township	
39	Green Valley Historic District	Green Valley Historic District	September 16, 1985 (#85002352)	Green Valley Road; 39°55′18″N 75°45′40″W	East Marlborough and Newlin Townships	
40	Joseph Gregg House	Joseph Gregg House	February 4, 1994 (#94000007)	500 Chandler Mill Road; 39°49′05″N 75°43′07″W	Kennett Township	
41	Hamorton Historic District	Hamorton Historic District	April 26, 1990 (#90000704)	Junction of U.S. Route 1 and Pennsylvania Route 52; 39°52′08″N 75°39′18″W	Kennett Township	A boundary increase was approved July 21, 2025.
42	Hance House and Barn	Hance House and Barn	September 16, 1985 (#85002354)	15 S Bridge Rd. (Pennsylvania Route 842); 39°55′39″N 75°39′12″W	East Bradford Township	
43	John Hanna Farm	John Hanna Farm	May 20, 1985 (#85001147)	Fairview Road near Coatesville; 39°56′11″N 75°47′42″W	East Fallowfield Township	
44	Col. John Hannum House	Col. John Hannum House	December 10, 1980 (#80003463)	Northeast of Marshallton at 898 Frank Road; 39°58′06″N 75°39′34″W	East Bradford Township	
45	Harlan House	Harlan House	May 9, 1985 (#85001004)	Pennsylvania Route 162 and Star Gazer Road, near Embreeville; 39°56′17″N 75°43′56″W	Newlin Township	
46	Harlan Log House	Harlan Log House	July 16, 1987 (#87001211)	Fairville Road near Kennett Square; 39°50′25″N 75°38′14″W	Kennett Township	
47	Peter Harvey House and Barn	Peter Harvey House and Barn	April 20, 1978 (#78002371)	East of Kennett Square on Hillendale Road near Mendenhall; 39°51′54″N 75°37′26″W	Pennsbury Township	
48	William Harvey House	William Harvey House	May 27, 1971 (#71000690)	Northwest of Chadds Ford on Brinton's Bridge Road off U.S. Route 1; 39°52′35″N 75°37′04″W	Pennsbury Township	
49	Hayes Homestead	Hayes Homestead	September 16, 1985 (#85002355)	Pennsylvania Route 162 and Harvey's Bridge Road; 39°56′09″N 75°44′10″W	Newlin Township	
50	Hayes Mill House	Hayes Mill House	September 16, 1985 (#85002358)	Star Gazer Road; 39°56′23″N 75°44′01″W	Newlin Township	
51	Jacob Hayes House	Jacob Hayes House	September 16, 1985 (#85002356)	Pennsylvania Route 162; 39°56′09″N 75°44′07″W	Newlin Township	
52	Cyrus Hoopes House and Barn	Cyrus Hoopes House and Barn	November 26, 1985 (#85003050)	Springdell Road; 39°54′33″N 75°49′59″W	West Marlborough Township	
53	Hopewell Historic District	Hopewell Historic District	February 28, 1991 (#91000226)	Roughly Hopewell Road from Lower Hopewell Road to Roneys Corner Road and area south, and Lower Hopewell Road north past Calvery Road; 39°46′46″N 76°01′01″W	East Nottingham and Lower Oxford Townships	
54	Hosanna Church and Cemetery	Hosanna Church and Cemetery	March 25, 2024 (#100010101)	531 University Road; 39°48′41″N 75°55′31″W	Upper Oxford Township	
55	House at Springdell	House at Springdell	September 16, 1985 (#85002360)	Pennsylvania Route 841; 39°54′25″N 75°50′09″W	West Marlborough Township	
56	House at Upper Laurel Iron Works	House at Upper Laurel Iron Works	September 16, 1985 (#85002371)	McCorkel's Rock Road; 39°56′00″N 75°46′47″W	Newlin Township	
57	Indian Deep Farm	Indian Deep Farm	September 16, 1985 (#85002372)	Glenhall and Groundhog College Roads; 39°55′34″N 75°41′59″W	Newlin Township	
58	Kennett Square Historic District	Kennett Square Historic District	August 18, 1989 (#89001052)	Roughly bounded by Sickles, Willow, Mulberry, Broad, South, Union, Cedar, Lafayette, State, and Washington; 39°50′41″N 75°42′44″W	Kennett Square	
59	Lenape Bridge	Lenape Bridge	June 22, 1988 (#88000781)	Pennsylvania Route 52 over parking lot 39°54′54″N 75°37′47″W	Birmingham and Pocopson Townships	
60	Lincoln University	Lincoln University	June 13, 2022 (#100007786)	1570 Baltimore Pike; 39°48′34″N 75°55′53″W	Lower Oxford Township	
61	Longwood Gardens District	Longwood Gardens District	December 10, 1972 (#72001105)	On U.S. Route 1 near Hamorton; 39°52′11″N 75°40′43″W	East Marlborough Township	
62	Lunn's Tavern	Lunn's Tavern	October 25, 1979 (#79002204)	Pennsylvania Route 896 at Strickersville; 39°44′06″N 75°47′38″W	London Britain Township	
63	Marlborough Village Historic District	Marlborough Village Historic District	March 8, 1995 (#95000130)	354–418 Marlborough Road and 901 and 940 Marlborough Springs Road, near Kennett Square; 39°54′00″N 75°42′11″W	East Marlborough and Newlin Townships	
64	Humphry Marshall House	Humphry Marshall House	May 27, 1971 (#71000695)	Strasburg Road / Pennsylvania Route 162 at the junction with Northbrook Road, near Marshallton; 39°57′02″N 75°40′54″W	West Bradford Township	
65	Marshallton Historic District	Marshallton Historic District	January 8, 1986 (#86000056)	Strasburg Road in Marshallton; 39°57′00″N 75°40′35″W	West Bradford Township	
66	Marshallton Inn	Marshallton Inn	July 29, 1977 (#77001152)	West Strasburg Road in Marshallton; 39°57′01″N 75°40′43″W	West Bradford Township	
67	Mercer's Mill Covered Bridge	Mercer's Mill Covered Bridge	December 11, 1980 (#80003509)	Northeast of Christiana and south of Atglen; 39°55′53″N 75°58′54″W	West Fallowfield Township	Extends into Lancaster County
68	Merestone	Merestone	March 2, 1995 (#95000093)	Yeatman's Station Rd. 39°45′45″N 75°44′57″W	New Garden Township	Extends into northern New Castle County, Delaware
69	Mortonville Hotel	Mortonville Hotel	September 18, 1985 (#85002393)	Strasburg Road near Coatesville; 39°56′49″N 75°46′41″W	East Fallowfield Township	
70	Mountain Meadow Farm	Mountain Meadow Farm	September 16, 1985 (#85002373)	Harvey's Bridge Road; 39°56′00″N 75°44′48″W	Newlin Township	
71	Northbrook Historic District	Northbrook Historic District	September 16, 1985 (#85002374)	Northbrook, Indian Hannah, and Bragg Hill Roads; 39°55′19″N 75°41′29″W	Newlin, Pocopson, and West Bradford Townships	
72	Oakdale	Oakdale	January 13, 1972 (#72001103)	Hillendale Road near Chadds Ford; 39°51′39″N 75°37′18″W	Pennsbury Township	
73	Old Kennett Meetinghouse	Old Kennett Meetinghouse	July 15, 1974 (#74001776)	South of West Chester on U.S. Route 1, east of its junction with Pennsylvania Route 52; 39°52′16″N 75°38′54″W	Kennett Township	
74	Orthodox Meetinghouse	Orthodox Meetinghouse	April 26, 1972 (#72001112)	Southwest of West Chester on Birmingham Road; 39°54′16″N 75°35′38″W	Birmingham Township	
75	Oxford Historic District	Oxford Historic District	February 1, 2007 (#06001336)	Roughly bounded by Church Road, Chase Street, Hodgson Street; 39°47′07″N 75°58′44″W	Oxford	
76	Oxford Hotel	Oxford Hotel	August 26, 1994 (#94001055)	Junction of Market and North 3rd Streets; 39°47′07″N 75°58′44″W	Oxford	
77	Paradise Valley Historic District	Paradise Valley Historic District	December 24, 1992 (#92001724)	Roughly Valley Creek Road from U.S. Route 322 to Ravine Road, near Marshallton; 39°59′04″N 75°39′55″W	East Bradford Township	
78	Parkersville Friends Meetinghouse	Parkersville Friends Meetinghouse	March 20, 1973 (#73001610)	South of Parkersville off Pennsylvania Route 926; 39°53′10″N 75°38′44″W	Pennsbury Township	
79	Mansel Passmore House	Mansel Passmore House	May 20, 1985 (#85001148)	Glen Rose Road near Coatesville; 39°56′25″N 75°51′06″W	East Fallowfield Township	
80	Isaac Pawling House	Isaac Pawling House	September 18, 1985 (#85002394)	Strasburg Road near Coatesville; 39°57′18″N 75°50′53″W	East Fallowfield Township	
81	Martha Pennock House	Martha Pennock House	May 20, 1985 (#85001149)	Pennsylvania Route 82 near Coatesville; 39°55′59″N 75°49′57″W	East Fallowfield Township	
82	Pennsbury Inn	Pennsbury Inn	March 16, 1972 (#72001104)	On U.S. Route 1 at its junction with Hickory Hill Road, near Chadds Ford; 39°52′29″N 75°38′13″W	Pennsbury Township	
83	William Peters House	William Peters House	May 27, 1971 (#71000696)	Hillendale Road near Mendenhall; 39°51′50″N 75°37′36″W	Pennsbury Township	
84	Joseph and Esther Phillips Plantation	Joseph and Esther Phillips Plantation	September 5, 1990 (#90001414)	Bailey's Crossroads, south of Glen Run Road and south of Atglen; 39°55′36″N 75°58′25″W	West Fallowfield Township	
85	Lukens Pierce House	Lukens Pierce House	March 14, 1973 (#73001604)	Northwest of Ercildoun on Wilmington Road; 39°57′09″N 75°51′00″W	East Fallowfield Township	
86	Pine Grove Covered Bridge	Pine Grove Covered Bridge	December 11, 1980 (#80003521)	Southeast of Kirkwood on Legislative Route 36018; 39°47′37″N 76°02′41″W	East Nottingham Township	Extends into Lancaster County
87	Powell Farm	Powell Farm	August 20, 1985 (#85001150)	Dupont Road near Coatesville; 39°56′13″N 75°48′29″W	East Fallowfield Township	
88	John Powell House	John Powell House	May 20, 1985 (#85001151)	Hephzibah Hill Road near Coatesville; 39°56′16″N 75°48′50″W	East Fallowfield Township	
89	Primitive Hall	Primitive Hall	March 19, 1975 (#75001629)	2 miles (3.2 km) northwest of Chatham on Pennsylvania Route 841; 39°52′33″N 75°50′02″W	West Marlborough Township	
90	Joshua Pusey House	Joshua Pusey House	May 20, 1985 (#85001152)	Saw Mill Road near Coatesville; 39°57′24″N 75°46′47″W	East Fallowfield Township	
91	Moses Ross House	Moses Ross House	September 16, 1985 (#85002375)	Off Creek Road north of Daleville; 39°53′45″N 75°52′21″W	Londonderry Township	
92	St. Malachi Church	St. Malachi Church	September 16, 1985 (#85002376)	St. Malachi Road; 39°53′48″N 75°50′57″W	Londonderry Township	
93	David Scott House	David Scott House	May 20, 1985 (#85001153)	Mt. Carmel Road near Coatesville; 39°57′35″N 75°51′41″W	East Fallowfield Township	
94	Thomas Scott House	Thomas Scott House	May 20, 1985 (#85001154)	Park Avenue near Coatesville; 39°57′55″N 75°51′09″W	East Fallowfield Township	
95	Sharpless Homestead	Sharpless Homestead	December 15, 2011 (#11000924)	1045 Birmingham Rd. 39°55′08″N 75°36′22″W	Birmingham Township	
96	South Brook Farm	South Brook Farm	November 14, 1991 (#91001710)	Junction of Street Road and Bird Road; 39°52′00″N 75°45′13″W	East Marlborough Township	
97	Speakman No. 1	Speakman No. 1	December 10, 1980 (#80003464)	South of Coatesville on Legislative Route 15068, near Modena; 39°55′46″N 75°49′23″W	East Fallowfield Township	
98	Speakman No. 2, Mary Ann Pyle Bridge	Speakman No. 2, Mary Ann Pyle Bridge	December 10, 1980 (#80003465)	South of Coatesville on Township 371, near Modena; 39°55′19″N 75°48′01″W	East Fallowfield Township	
99	Springdale Farm	Springdale Farm	March 7, 1973 (#73001607)	Northeast of Mendenhall on Hillendale Road; 39°51′39″N 75°37′45″W	Pennsbury Township	
100	Spruce Grove School	Spruce Grove School	September 16, 1985 (#85002378)	Brandywine Creek Road; 39°56′07″N 75°46′08″W	Newlin Township	
101	Robert Steen House	Robert Steen House	May 20, 1985 (#85001155)	Fairview Road near Coatesville; 39°56′28″N 75°47′16″W	East Fallowfield Township	
102	Linton Stephens Covered Bridge	Linton Stephens Covered Bridge	December 10, 1980 (#80003466)	Southwest of New London on Township 344; 39°45′23″N 75°54′46″W	Elk and New London Townships	
103	Strode's Mill	Strode's Mill	May 27, 1971 (#71000697)	Junction of Pennsylvania Route 52 and Birmingham Road; 39°55′43″N 75°37′04″W	East Bradford Township	
104	Strode's Mill Historic District	Strode's Mill Historic District	May 5, 1989 (#89000354)	Junction of Pennsylvania Route 52 and Birmingham Road; 39°55′42″N 75°37′03″W	East Bradford Township	
105	Taylor House	Taylor House	August 1, 1979 (#79002202)	East of Marshallton on West Strasburg Road; 39°57′27″N 75°39′40″W	East Bradford Township	
106	Taylor-Cope Historic District	Taylor-Cope Historic District	July 16, 1987 (#87001250)	890–1100 blocks of Strasburg Road/Pennsylvania Route 162 in Marshallton; 39°57′32″N 75°38′50″W	West Bradford Township	
107	Temple-Webster-Stoner House	Temple-Webster-Stoner House	March 7, 1973 (#72133612)	East of Romansville off Pennsylvania Route 162; 39°56′42″N 75°42′05″W	West Bradford Township	
108	Thompson Farm	Thompson Farm	July 14, 1983 (#83002228)	632 Chambers Rock Road near New London; 39°43′54″N 75°46′57″W	London Britain Township	
109	Trimbleville Historic District	Trimbleville Historic District	September 16, 1985 (#85002377)	Northbrook, Broad Run, and Camp Linden Roads; 39°55′55″N 75°40′56″W	Pocopson and West Bradford Townships	
110	Twin Bridges Rural Historic District	Twin Bridges Rural Historic District	September 18, 2017 (#100001635)	Roughly bounded by Creek and Bullock Rds., the Beverly Farm, Big Bend, and Hill Girt Farms estates, and Brandywine Creek; 39°50′54″N 75°36′09″W	Pennsbury Township	Extends into Chadds Ford Township in Delaware County
111	Unionville Village Historic District	Unionville Village Historic District	June 6, 1979 (#79002205)	Pennsylvania Routes 82 and 162, at Unionville; 39°53′42″N 75°44′09″W	East Marlborough Township	
112	Rev. Joshua Vaughan House	Rev. Joshua Vaughan House	September 18, 1985 (#85002395)	Strasburg Road near Coatesville; 39°57′03″N 75°48′54″W	East Fallowfield Township	
113	Asa Walton House	Asa Walton House	September 18, 1985 (#85002396)	Strasburg and Old Wilmington Roads, near Coatesville; 39°57′20″N 75°51′16″W	East Fallowfield Township	
114	John Wentz House	John Wentz House	May 20, 1985 (#85001156)	Pennsylvania Route 82 near Coatesville; 39°56′40″N 75°49′59″W	East Fallowfield Township	
115	White Horse Tavern	White Horse Tavern	September 18, 1985 (#85002397)	Strasburg Road near Coatesville; 39°57′02″N 75°49′11″W	East Fallowfield Township	
116	Gideon Wickersham Farmstead	Gideon Wickersham Farmstead	January 30, 1988 (#87001992)	750 Northbrook Road near Kennett Square; 39°53′19″N 75°41′23″W	East Marlborough Township	
117	Wiley-Cloud House	Wiley-Cloud House	September 4, 2012 (#12000606)	107 Ironstone Ln. 39°49′51″N 75°40′19″W	Kennett Township	
118	Wilkinson House	Wilkinson House	September 16, 1985 (#85002379)	Pennsylvania Route 842; 39°55′33″N 75°39′57″W	Pocopson Township	
119	Robert Wilson House	Robert Wilson House	September 18, 1985 (#85002398)	Strasburg Road near Coatesville; 39°57′09″N 75°50′32″W	East Fallowfield Township	
120	Worker's House at Lower Laurel Iron Works	Worker's House at Lower Laurel Iron Works	September 16, 1985 (#85002381)	Creek Road; 39°56′14″N 75°46′08″W	Newlin Township	
121	Worth-Jefferis Rural Historic District	Worth-Jefferis Rural Historic District	April 27, 1995 (#95000523)	Roughly along Lucky Hill, North Wawaset, Allerton, and Creek Roads, near Marshallton; 39°56′15″N 75°39′13″W	East and West Bradford Townships	
122	Joseph Young House	Joseph Young House	September 16, 1985 (#85002383)	Creek Road; 39°56′12″N 75°45′39″W	Newlin Township	
123	Robert Young House	Robert Young House	September 18, 1985 (#85002399)	Strasburg Road near Coatesville; 39°57′02″N 75°49′13″W	East Fallowfield Township	

== Former listings ==
	Name on the Register	Image	Date listed	Date removed	Location	Municipality	Description
1	Bridge in New Garden Township	Bridge in New Garden Township	June 22, 1988 (#88000804)	March 23, 2010	Landenberg Road over White Clay Creek, near Landenberg; 39°46′39″N 75°46′19″W	New Garden Township	Delisted due to alterations made to the bridge during replacement in 2010.
2	Mortonville Bridge	Mortonville Bridge	September 18, 1985 (#85002392)	July 16, 2010	Strasburg Road near Coatesville; 39°56′47″N 75°46′47″W	East Fallowfield Township and Newlin Township	Delisted due to alterations made to the bridge during rehabilitation and expansion in 2010.
3	Rudolph and Arthur Covered Bridge	Rudolph and Arthur Covered Bridge	December 10, 1980 (#80003473)	December 12, 2022	North of Lewisville on Township 307 near West Grove; 39°44′45″N 75°52′57″W	Elk and New London Townships	Destroyed September 1, 2021 by flooding from Hurricane Ida. Reconstructed in 2025.
