= Powell House =

Powell House may refer to:

== In the United States ==
Various buildings on the National Register of Historic Places (by state):

- Benjamin T. Powell House, Camden, Arizona
- Powell House (California), a contributing property in the Nevada City Downtown Historic District
- Powell and Blair Stone Ranch, Proctor, Colorado
- William E. and Sarah Dillard Powell House, Dillard, Georgia
- Samuel Powell House, Waterville, Kansas
- Powell House (Wichita, Kansas)
- William S. Powell House, Princeton, Kentucky
- Powell-Vail House, Pheba, Mississippi
- Chew–Powell House, Blenheim, New Jersey
- Elsie K. Powell House, Old Chatham, New York, a Quaker conference and retreat center
- Powell-Brookshire-Parker Farm, Ellerbe, North Carolina
- Powell House (Fair Bluff, North Carolina)
- Williams-Powell House, Orrum, North Carolina
- Powell House (Wake Forest, North Carolina)
- Henry Powell House, Cincinnati, Ohio
- Andrew Powell Homestead, Findlay, Ohio
- Curtis W. Powell House, Dayton, Oregon
- John Powell House, Coatesville, Pennsylvania
- Powell Farm (Coatesville, Pennsylvania)
- Mathews-Powell House, Queen City, Texas
- David Powell House, Beaver, Utah
- Hook-Powell-Moorman Farm, Hales Ford, Virginia
- Powell-McMullan House, Stanardsville, Virginia
- Powell House (Yakima, Washington)
- Powell-Redmond House, Clifton, West Virginia

== See also ==
- Powel House, Society Hill, Philadelphia, Pennsylvania
