= Wiley House =

Wiley House may refer to:

(by state then town)

- Emily Wiley House, a historic house in Washington, D.C.
- Orton H. Wiley House, a historic house in Nampa, Idaho, listed on the NRHP in Canyon County
- Tobe Wiley House, Paintsville, Kentucky, listed on the NRHP in Johnson County
- James Sullivan Wiley House, a historic house in Dover-Foxcroft, Maine
- Benjamin Wiley House, a historic house in North Fryeburg, Maine
- Wiley-Ringland House, a historic house in Chevy Chase, Maryland
- Caleb Wiley House, a historic house in Stoneham, Massachusetts
- Mason-Lloyd-Wiley House, a historic house in Chapel Hill, North Carolina, home of Thomas F. Lloyd
- KidsPeace, a Pennsylvania-based children's charity, formerly known as Wiley House
- Wiley-Cloud House, a historic house in Kennett Township, Pennsylvania, listed on the NRHP in Chester County
- Thomas W. Wiley House, a historic house in McKinney, Texas, listed on the NRHP in Collin County

== See also ==
- Wylie House, a historic house in Bloomington, Indiana
