= Nelson P. Boyer Barn =

- Formerly listed on the U.S. National Register of Historic Places
- Location: Old Wilmington Rd., East Fallowfield Township, Pennsylvania
- Area: 0.5 acres (0.20 ha)
- Built: 1894
- Built by: Steele, Samuel
- Architectural style: Late Gothic Revival
- MPS: East Fallowfield Township MRA
- NRHP reference No.: 85003654

Significant dates
- Added to NRHP: May 20, 1985
- Removed from NRHP: July 26, 1991

The Nelson P. Boyer Barn was an historic barn that was located in East Fallowfield Township, Chester County, Pennsylvania, United States.

It was added to the National Register of Historic Places in 1985, and delisted in 1991 after demolition.

== History and architectural features ==
Built in 1894, this historic barn was a sixty-foot by seventy-foot, wood-frame structure that was designed in the Late Gothic Revival style. It was built to stable 100 head of stock for stock breeding, was known at the turn of the twentieth century as the "Showplace of Chester County," and was used by Buffalo Bill as practice and winter quarters.

In 1990, as the barn was deteriorating rapidly, plans were made to disassemble it and sell it to antique dealer Randy Hilgert of Madison, Connecticut.

It was added to the National Register of Historic Places in 1985, and delisted in 1991 after demolition.
