= John Bailey Farm =

Historic house in Pennsylvania, United States

- U.S. National Register of Historic Places
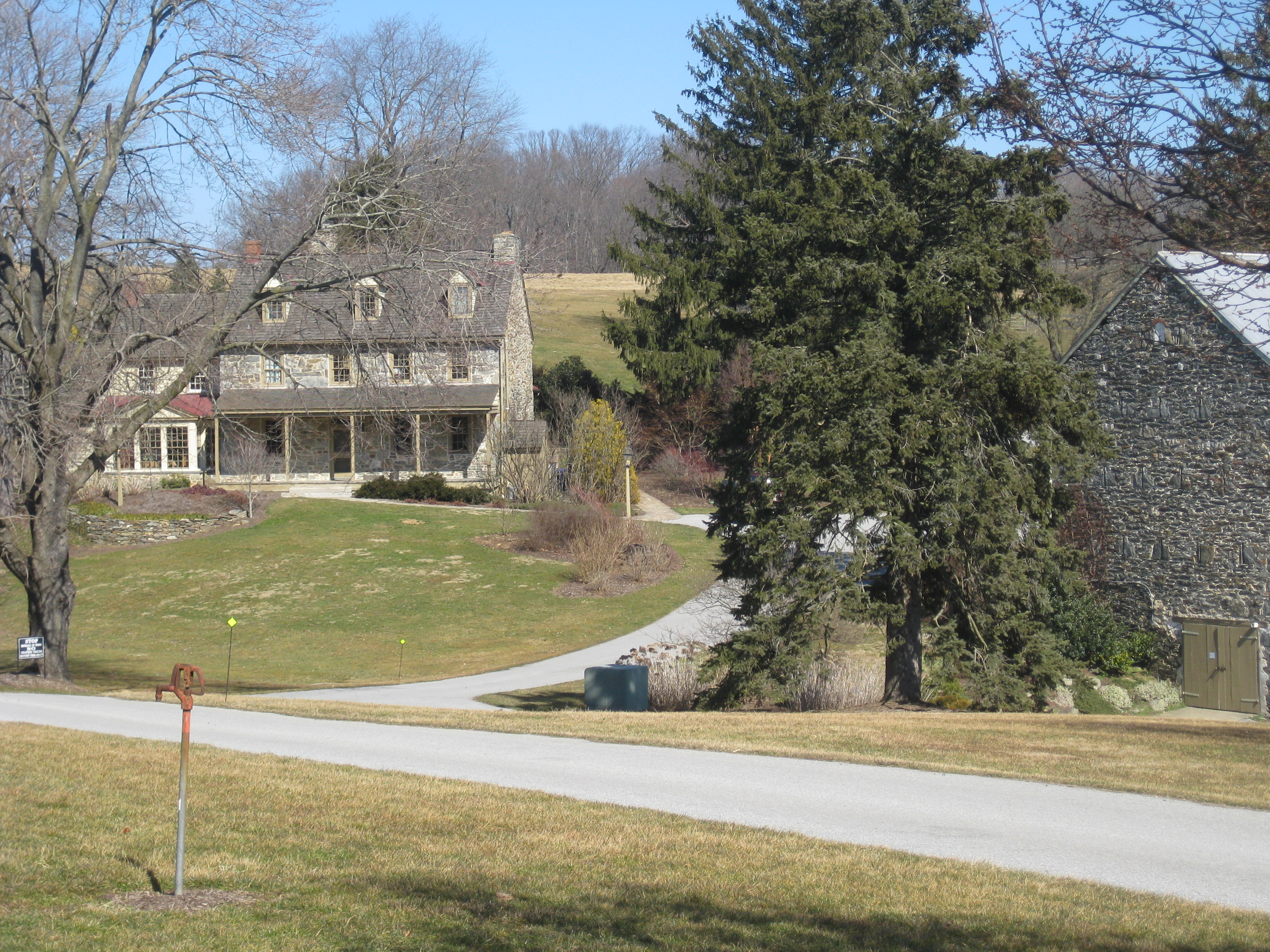
- John Bailey Farm, February 2012

- Location within Pennsylvania Location within the United States
- Location: Springdell Road near Coatesville, East Fallowfield Township, Pennsylvania
- Coordinates: 39°55′41″N 75°50′28″W
- Area: 3.4 acres (1.4 ha)
- Built: 1810
- Architectural style: Federal, Vernacular Federal
- MPS: East Fallowfield Township MRAEast Fallowfield Township MRA
- NRHP reference No.: 85001143
- Added to NRHP: May 20, 1985

John Bailey Farm is a historic home located in East Fallowfield Township, Chester County, Pennsylvania. It was built about 1810, and is a two-story, four-bay, stone farmhouse with a gable roof in a vernacular Federal style. It features gable end chimneys. The property also contains a barn and spring house.

It was added to the National Register of Historic Places in 1985.
