= Wiley-Cloud House =

Historic house in Pennsylvania, U.S.

- U.S. National Register of Historic Places
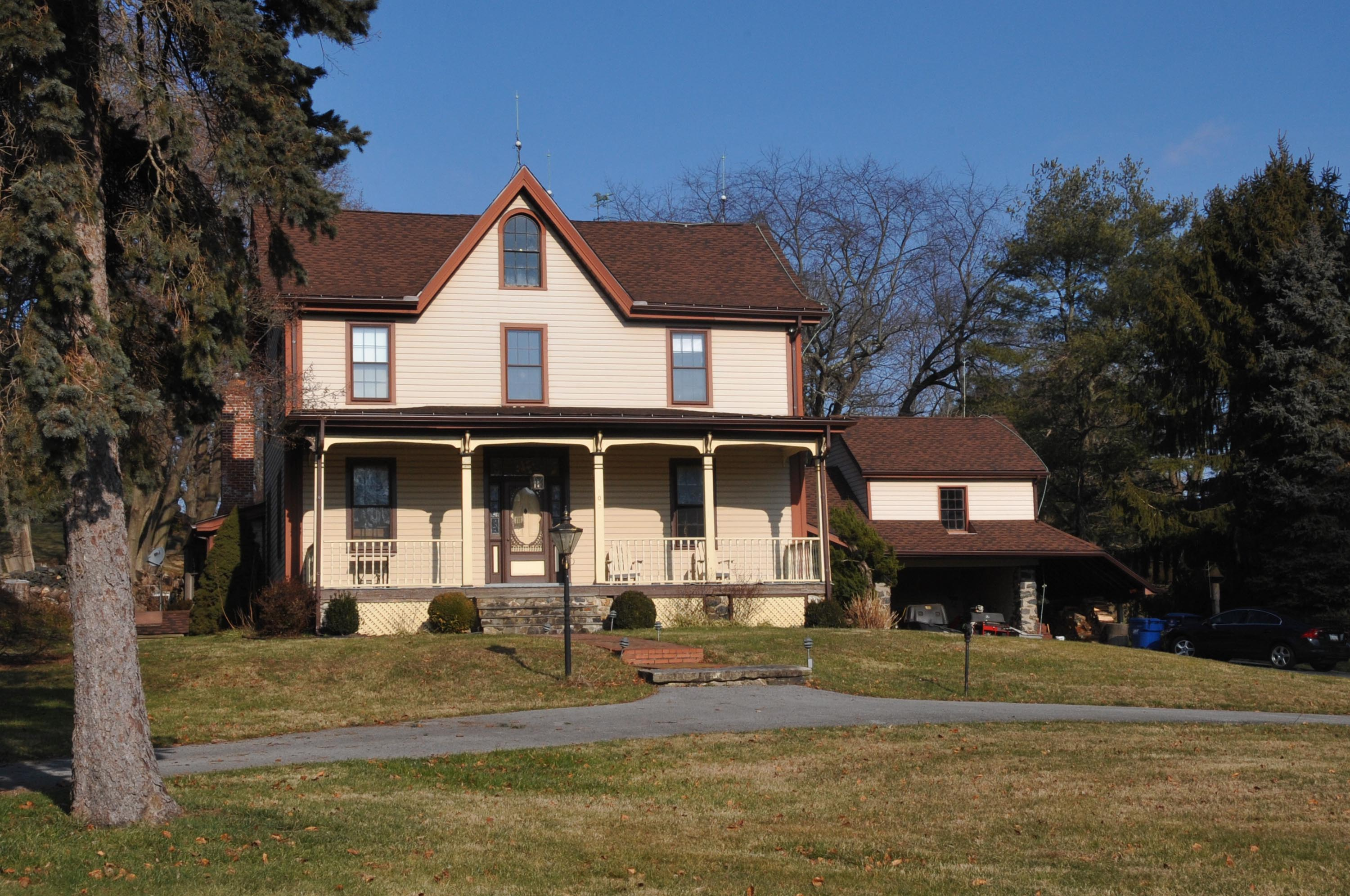
- Location: 107 Ironstone Lane; Kennett Square, PA
- Built: 1750
- Architect: William Wiley
- Architectural style: Colonial
- NRHP reference No.: 12000606
- Added to NRHP: September 4, 2012

The Wiley-Cloud House is an American historic house located at 107 Ironstone Lane in Kennett Township, Chester County, in the U.S. state of Pennsylvania. William Wiley constructed the house in the Colonial architectural style circa 1750, with architecturally significant renovations being made through 1799.

The building was listed on the National Register of Historic Places in 2012.

== See also ==
- National Register of Historic Places listings in southern Chester County, Pennsylvania
