= Robert Young House =

Historic house in Pennsylvania, United States

- U.S. National Register of Historic Places
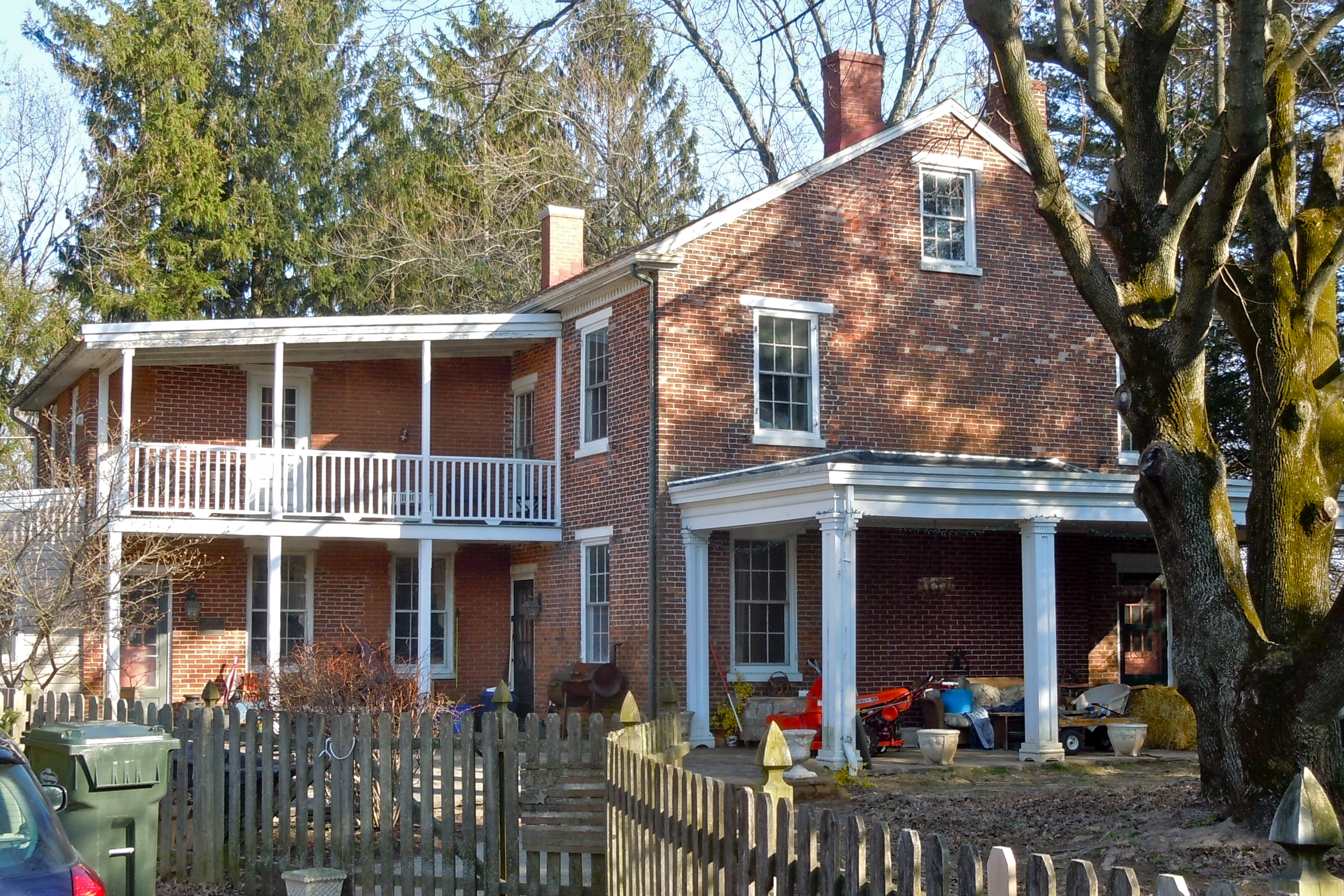
- Robert Young House, March 2011

- Location within Pennsylvania Location within the United States
- Location: Strasburg Road near Coatesville, East Fallowfield Township, Pennsylvania
- Coordinates: 39°57′2″N 75°49′13″W
- Area: 0.8 acres (0.32 ha)
- Built: 1856
- Architectural style: Federal
- MPS: Strasburg Road TR;East Fallowfield Township MRA
- NRHP reference No.: 85002399
- Added to NRHP: September 18, 1985

Robert Young House is a historic home located in East Fallowfield Township, Chester County, Pennsylvania. It was built in 1856, and is a two-story, three-bay, brick dwelling with a gable roof in the Federal style. It features separated chimneys and Palladian windows in the gable ends. The house was built for Robert Young, owner of the White Horse Tavern located across the intersection.

It was added to the National Register of Historic Places in 1985.
