= Martha Pennock House =

Historic house in Pennsylvania, United States

- U.S. National Register of Historic Places
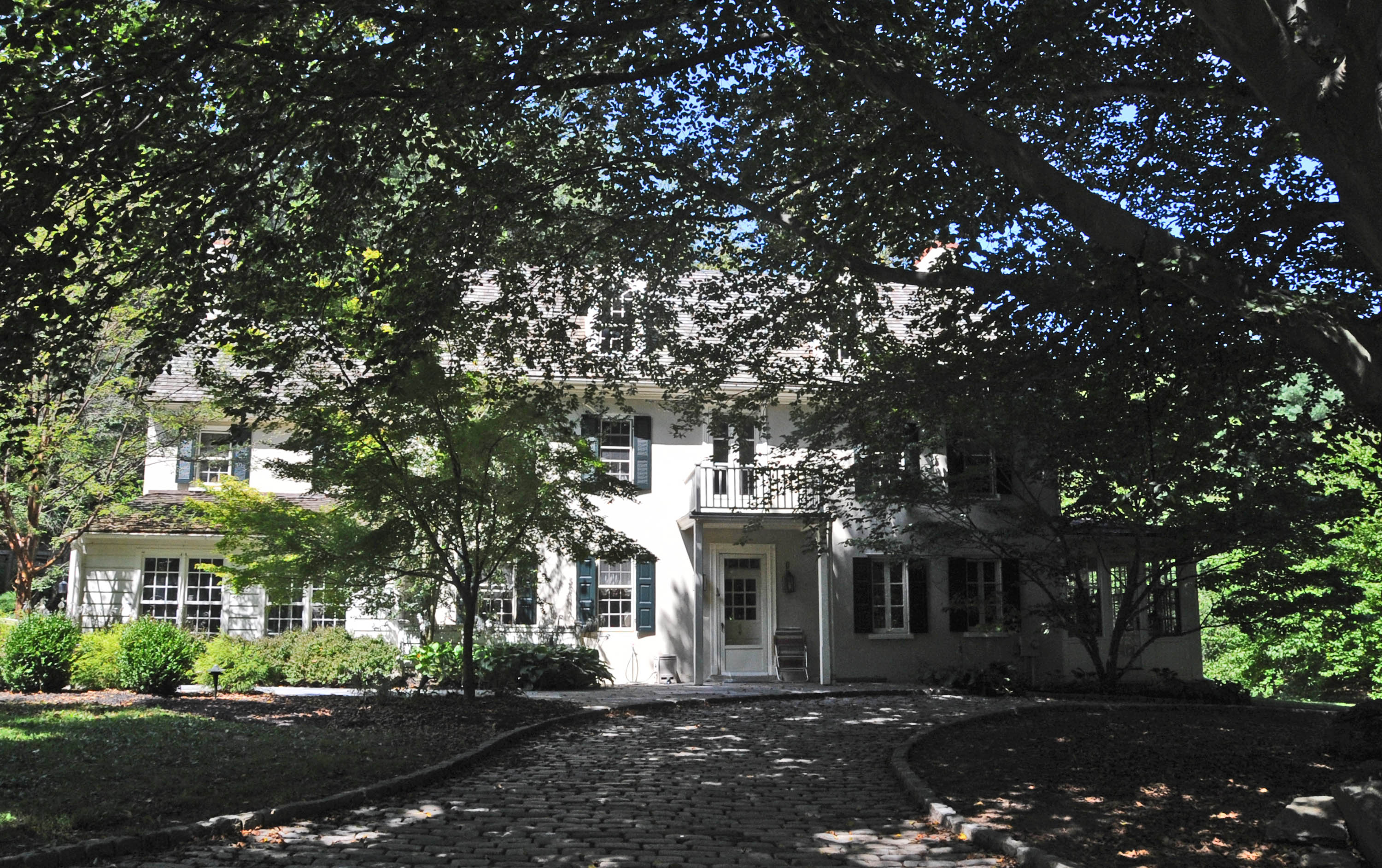

- Location within Pennsylvania Location within the United States
- Location: Pennsylvania Route 82 near Coatesville, East Fallowfield Township, Pennsylvania
- Coordinates: 39°55′59″N 75°49′57″W
- Area: 2.8 acres (1.1 ha)
- Built: 1825, c. 1840
- Architectural style: Greek Revival, Other, Federal, Vernacular Federal
- MPS: East Fallowfield Township MRAEast Fallowfield Township MRA
- NRHP reference No.: 85001149
- Added to NRHP: May 20, 1985

The Martha Pennock House is a set of two historic homes that are located in East Fallowfield Township, Chester County, Pennsylvania.

It was added to the National Register of Historic Places in 1985.

== History and architectural features ==
The older house was built circa 1825 as the Ironmaster's mansion by Martha Pennock, widow of Isaac Pennock, for her son Isaac. It is a two-story, five-bay, stuccoed, stone, Federal-style dwelling. The second house was built circa 1840, and is a two-story, four-bay, stuccoed, stone, Greek Revival-style dwelling. It features a full-width, front verandah. The mill complex where the houses are located was the home of Rebecca Lukens (1794–1854), daughter of Martha Pennock, for a short time after her marriage to Charles Lukens.
