= Drovers Inn =

- U.S. National Register of Historic Places
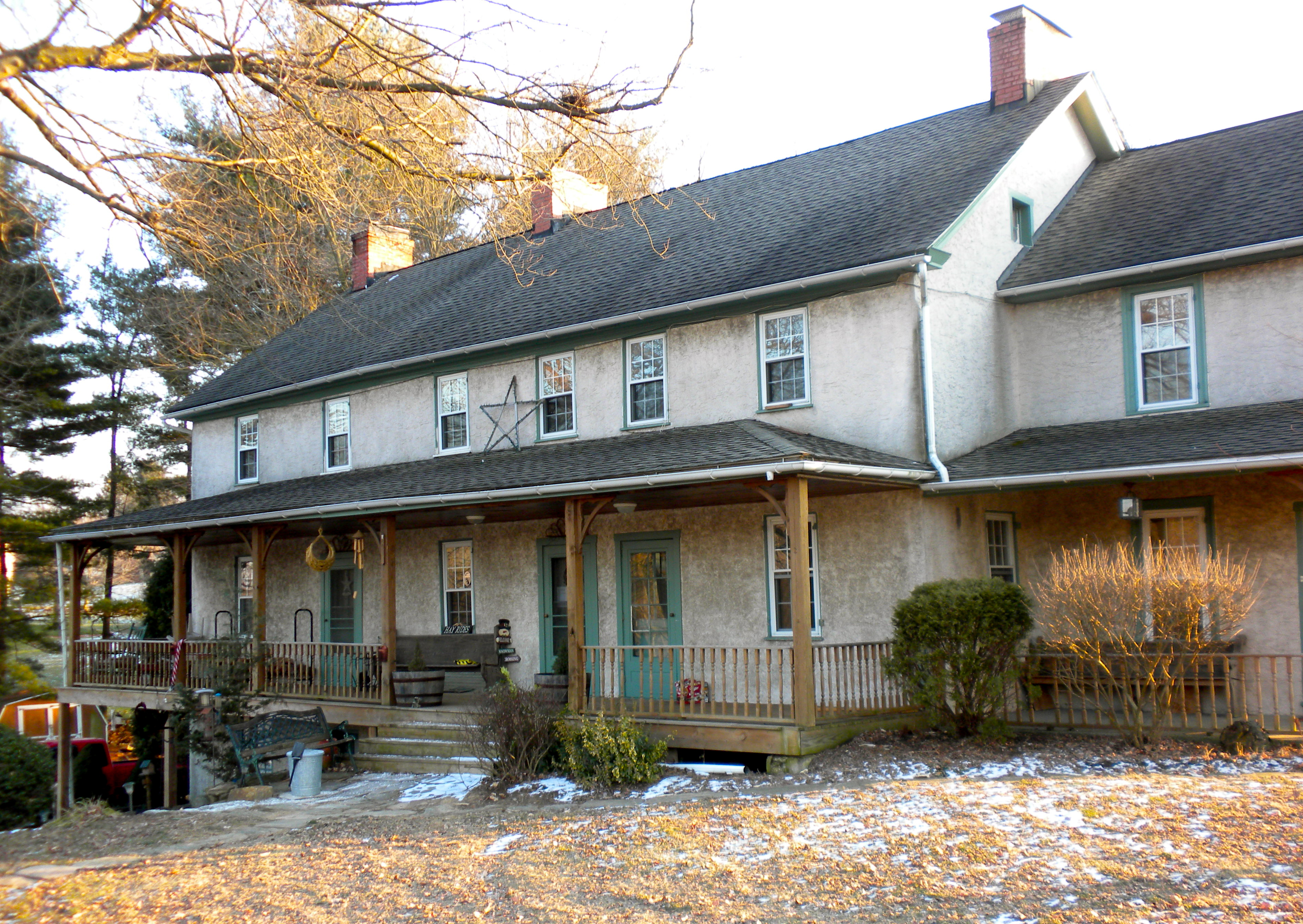
- Drovers Inn, January 2010

- Location within Pennsylvania Location within the United States
- Location: Strasburg Road near Coatesville, East Fallowfield Township, Pennsylvania
- Coordinates: 39°57′14″N 75°50′18″W
- Area: less than one acre
- Built: c. 1820
- Architectural style: Federal
- MPS: Strasburg Road TR;East Fallowfield Township MRA
- NRHP reference No.: 85002388
- Added to NRHP: September 18, 1985

Drovers Inn, also known as the Jesse Bentley House, is a historic inn and tavern located in East Fallowfield Township, Chester County, Pennsylvania. It was built about 1820, and is a two- to three-story, six-bay, banked stuccoed stone structure with a gable roof. It features a full-width verandah with a hipped roof.

It was added to the National Register of Historic Places in 1985.
