= Glen Rose Historic District =

Historic district in Pennsylvania, United States

- U.S. National Register of Historic Places
- U.S. Historic district
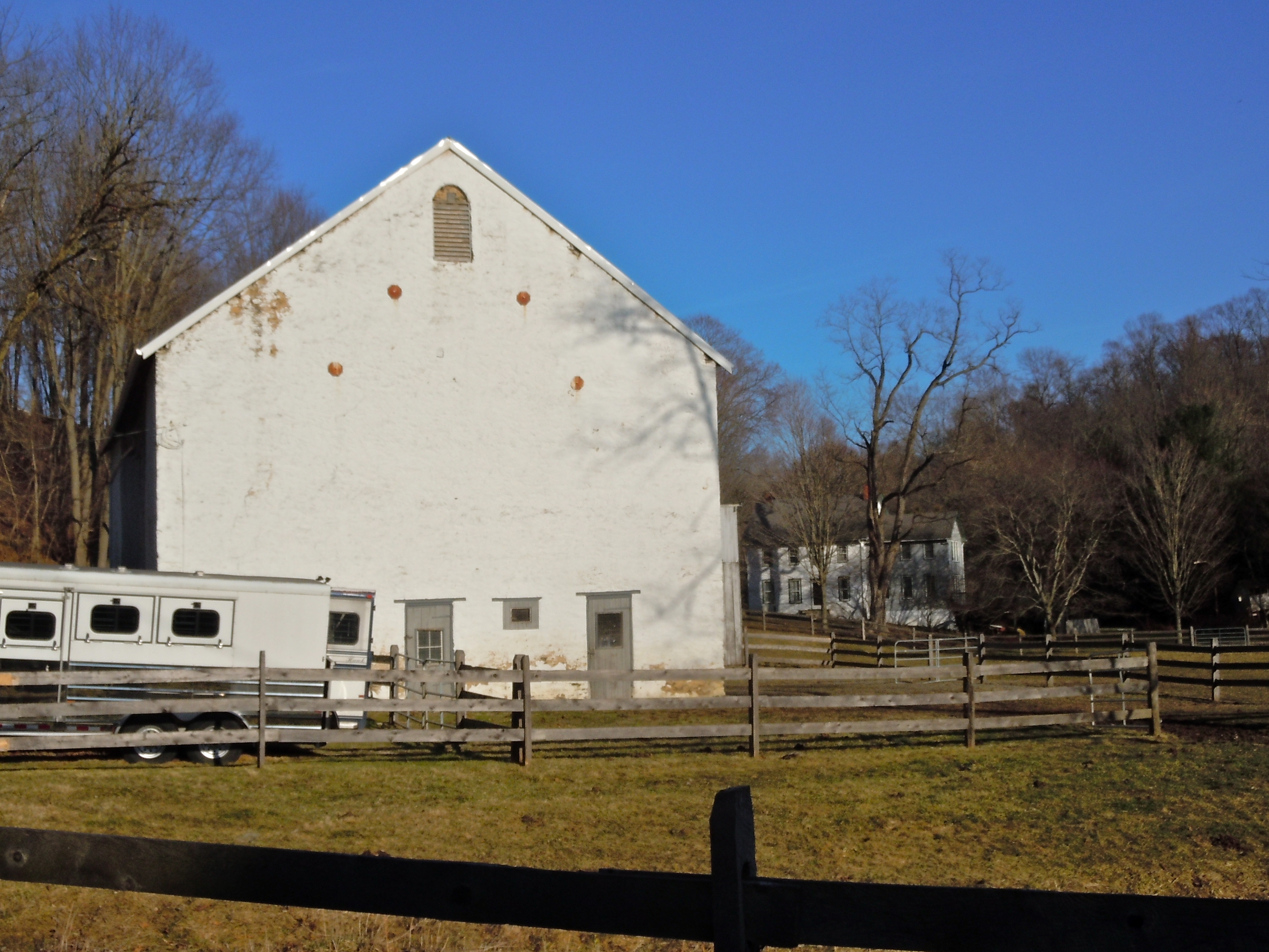
- Glen Rose Historic District, March 2011

- Location within Pennsylvania Location within the United States
- Location: Fairview Road near Coatesville, East Fallowfield Township, Pennsylvania
- Coordinates: 39°56′37″N 75°51′33″W
- Area: 9 acres (3.6 ha)
- Architectural style: Federal
- MPS: East Fallowfield Township MRAEast Fallowfield Township MRA
- NRHP reference No.: 85002384
- Added to NRHP: September 18, 1985

The Glen Rose Historic District is a national historic district which is located in East Fallowfield Township, Chester County, Pennsylvania.

It was added to the National Register of Historic Places in 1985.

== History and architectural features ==
This district encompasses seven contributing buildings. They are the James Newlin Tenant House, which was built circa 1840, the George Passmore House, which was erected circa 1810, the Thomas Truman Grist Mill, which was built sometime around 1775, the James Newlin House, which was erected sometime around 1836, the George Passmore Cobbler Shop, which was built circa 1805, the George Passmore Cider Mill, which was erected circa 1825, and the chapel, which was built sometime around 1920.
