= Robert Steen House =

Historic house in Pennsylvania, United States

- U.S. National Register of Historic Places
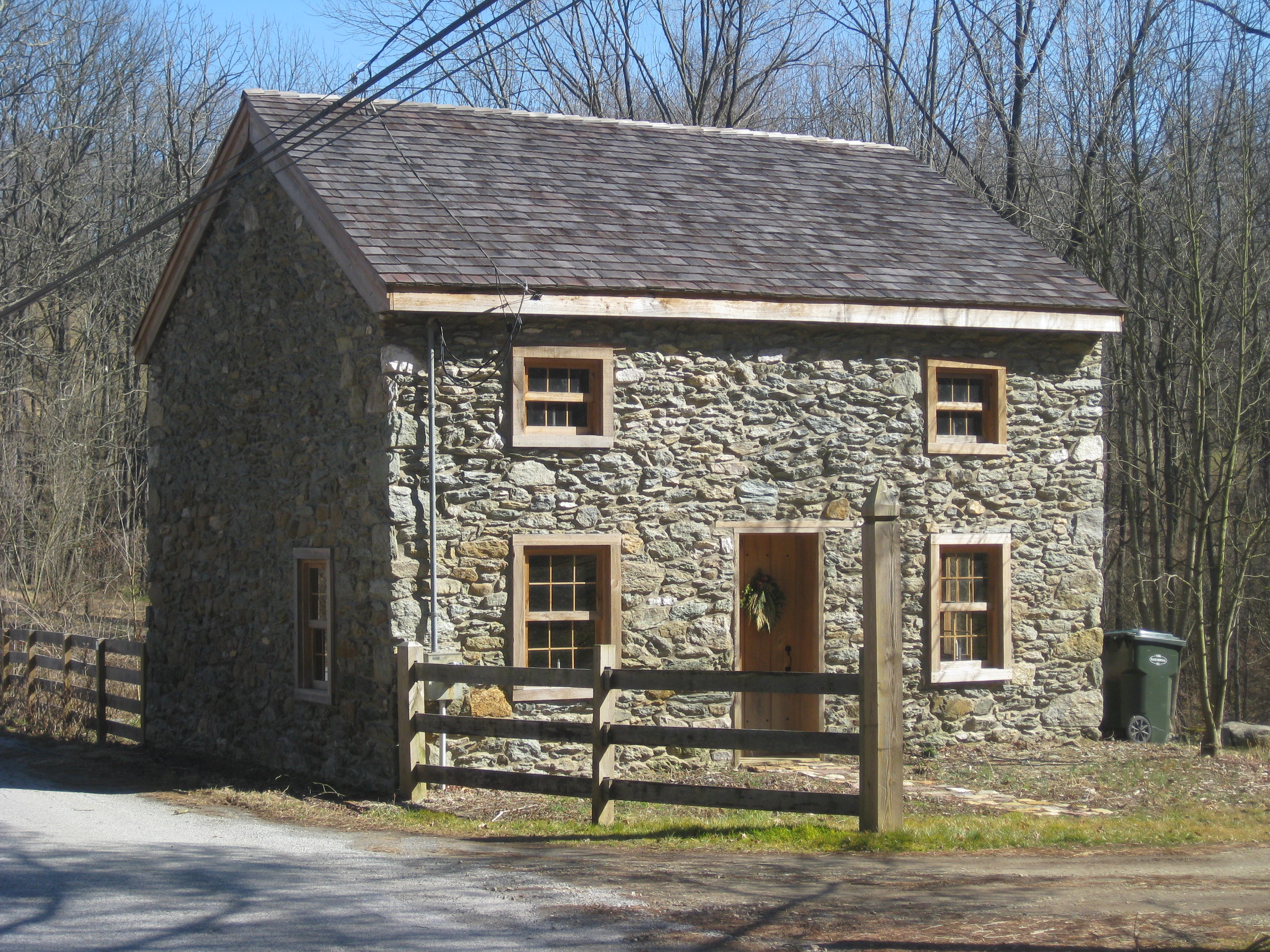
- Robert Steen House, February 2012

- Location within Pennsylvania Location within the United States
- Location: Fairview Road near Coatesville, East Fallowfield Township, Pennsylvania
- Coordinates: 39°56′28″N 75°47′16″W
- Area: less than one acre
- Built: 1846
- Architectural style: Greek Revival, Other, Vernacular Greek Revival
- MPS: East Fallowfield Township MRAEast Fallowfield Township MRA
- NRHP reference No.: 85001155
- Added to NRHP: May 20, 1985

Robert Steen House is a historic home located in East Fallowfield Township, Chester County, Pennsylvania. The house was built about 1846, and is a 1 1/2-story, two-bay, stuccoed stone, vernacular Greek Revival style dwelling. It has a small rear extension.

It was added to the National Register of Historic Places in 1985.
