= John Hanna Farm =

Historic house in Pennsylvania, United States

- U.S. National Register of Historic Places
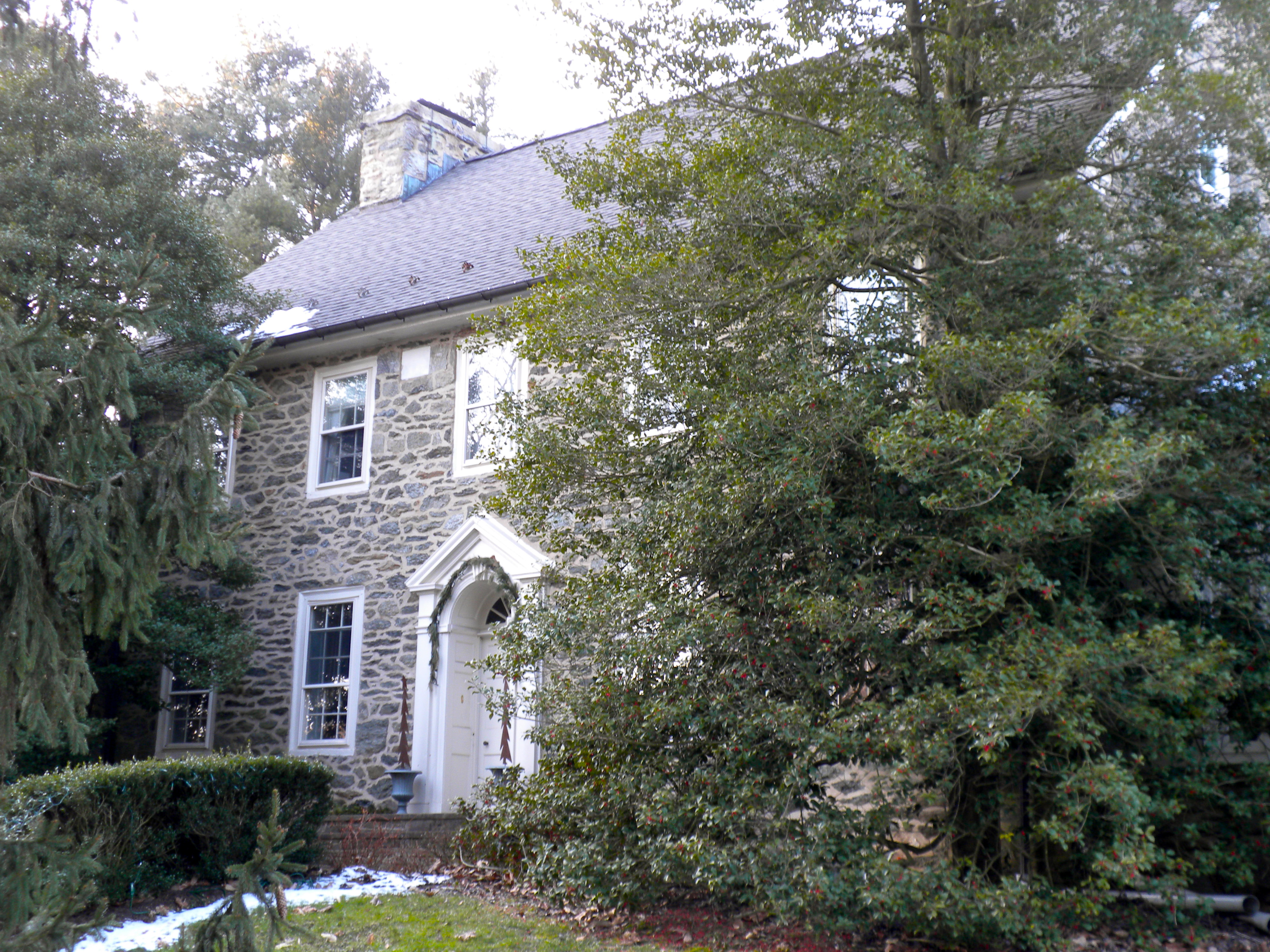
- John Hanna Farmhouse, January 2010

- Location within Pennsylvania Location within the United States
- Location: Fairview Road near Coatesville, East Fallowfield Township, Pennsylvania
- Coordinates: 39°56′11″N 75°47′42″W
- Area: less than one acre
- Built: 1819
- Architectural style: Federal, Vernacular Federal
- MPS: East Fallowfield Township MRAEast Fallowfield Township MRA
- NRHP reference No.: 85001147
- Added to NRHP: May 20, 1985

John Hanna Farm is a historic home located in East Fallowfield Township, Chester County, Pennsylvania. It was built about 1819, and is a two-story, five-bay, stone farmhouse with a gable roof in a vernacular Federal style. It features a formal main entrance with pediment, pilasters, and elliptical fanlight. Also on the property is a contributing barn.

It was added to the National Register of Historic Places in 1985.
