= John Wentz House =

Historic house in Pennsylvania, United States

- U.S. National Register of Historic Places
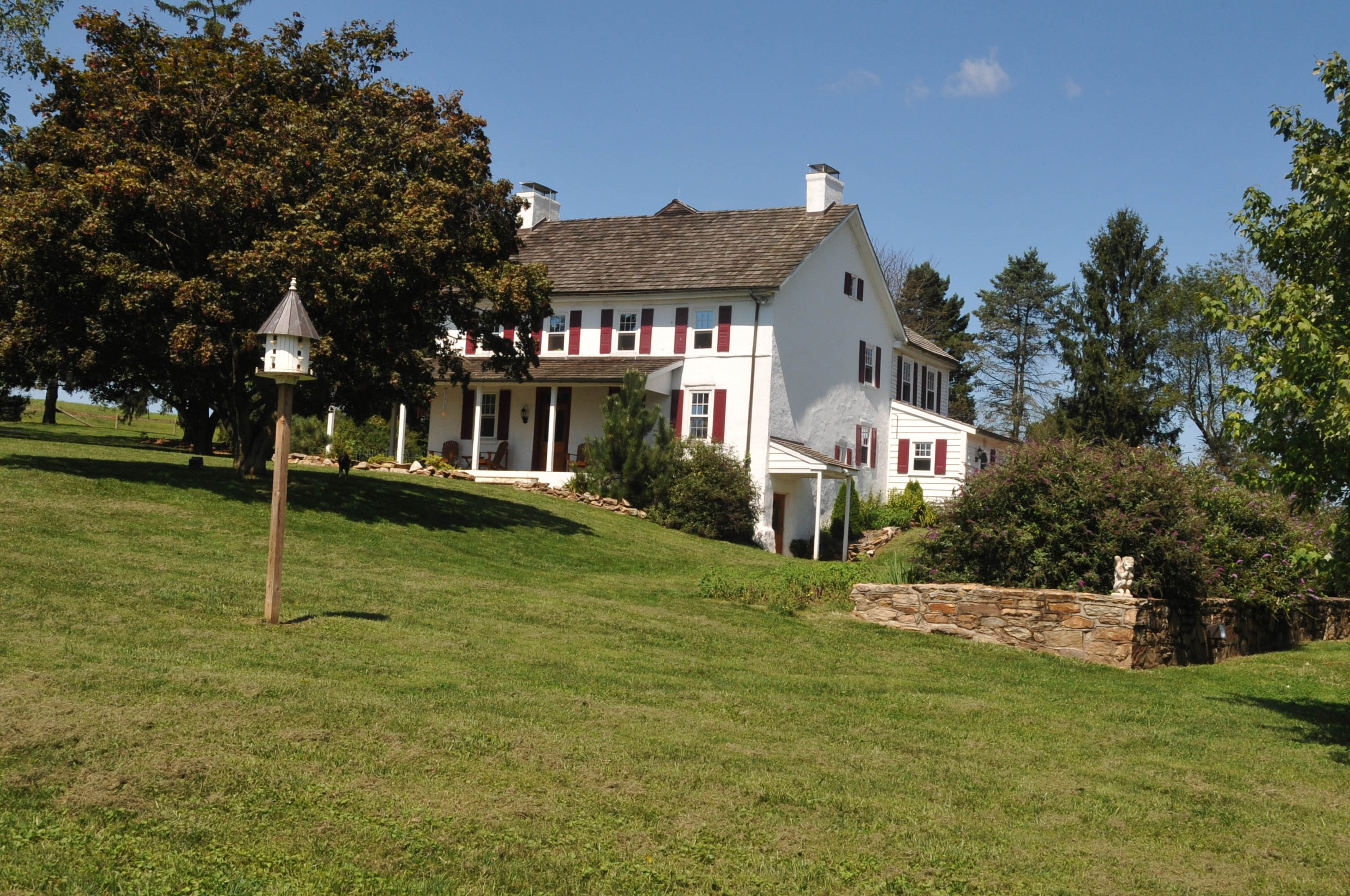

- Location within Pennsylvania Location within the United States
- Location: Pennsylvania Route 82 near Coatesville, East Fallowfield Township, Pennsylvania
- Coordinates: 39°56′40″N 75°49′59″W
- Area: 2.1 acres (0.85 ha)
- Built: c. 1793
- Architectural style: Federal, Vernacular Federal
- MPS: East Fallowfield Township MRAEast Fallowfield Township MRA
- NRHP reference No.: 85001156
- Added to NRHP: May 20, 1985

The John Wentz House is an historic home that is located on Emmitsburg Road (U.S. Route 15), East Fallowfield Township, Chester County, Pennsylvania, United States.

It was added to the National Register of Historic Places in 1985.

== History and architectural features ==
Built circa 1793, this historic structure is a two-story, four-bay, stuccoed, stone, vernacular Federal-style dwelling. It has a gable roof and a wraparound verandah. Also located on the property are a contributing barn and spring house.
