= Joseph Gladden House =

Historic house in Pennsylvania, United States

- U.S. National Register of Historic Places
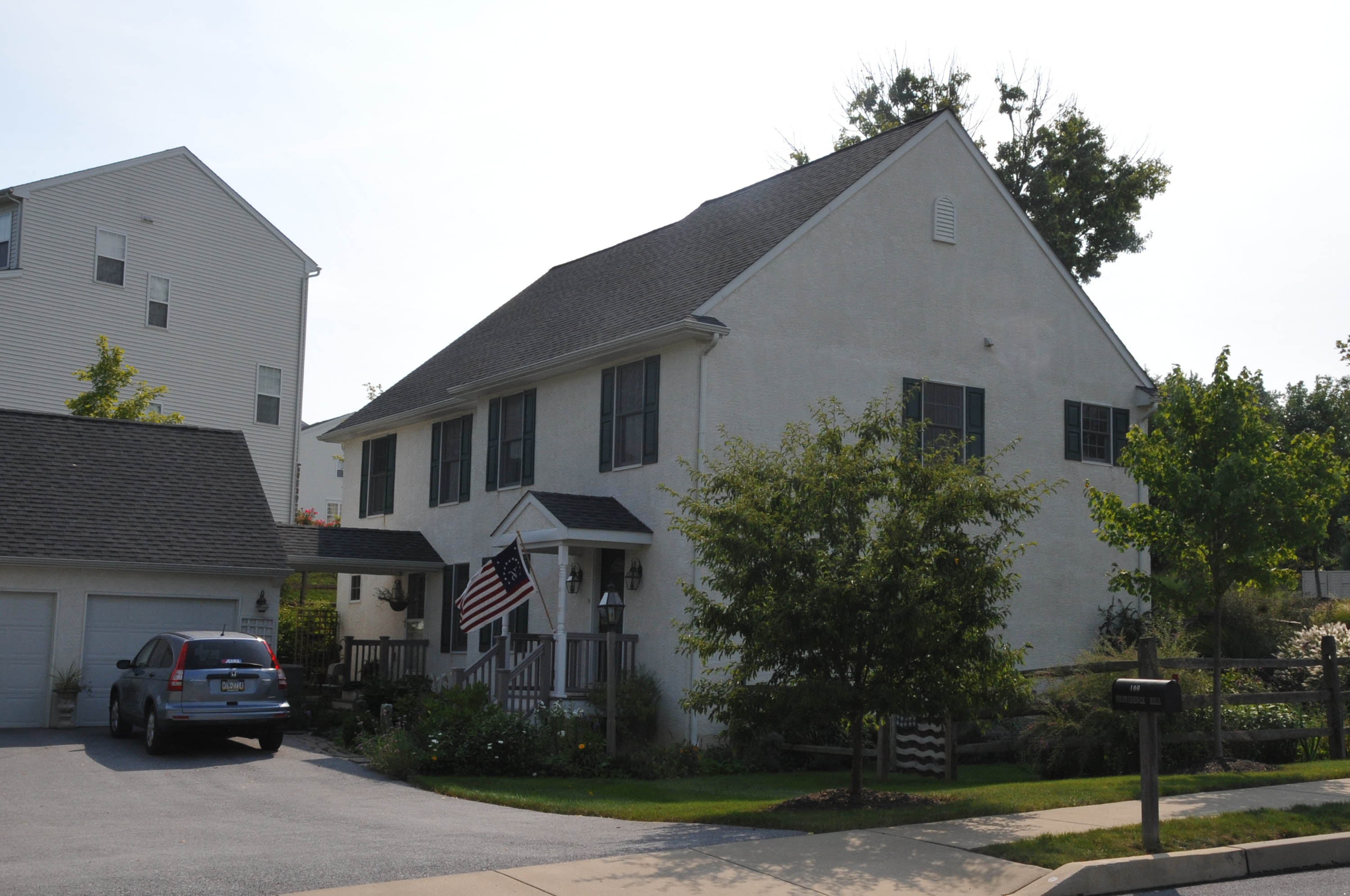

- Location within Pennsylvania Location within the United States
- Location: West Chester Road near Coatesville, East Fallowfield Township, Pennsylvania
- Coordinates: 39°58′45″N 75°47′29″W
- Area: 2.8 acres (1.1 ha)
- Built: c. 1800
- Architectural style: Penn Plan
- MPS: East Fallowfield Township MRAEast Fallowfield Township MRA
- NRHP reference No.: 85001146
- Added to NRHP: May 20, 1985

Joseph Gladden House is a historic home located in East Fallowfield Township, Chester County, Pennsylvania. It was built about 1800, and is a two-story, two-bay, stuccoed stone Penn Plan dwelling. Two additions were built on the rear of the house.

It was added to the National Register of Historic Places in 1985.
