= Joshua Pusey House =

Historic house in Pennsylvania, United States

- U.S. National Register of Historic Places
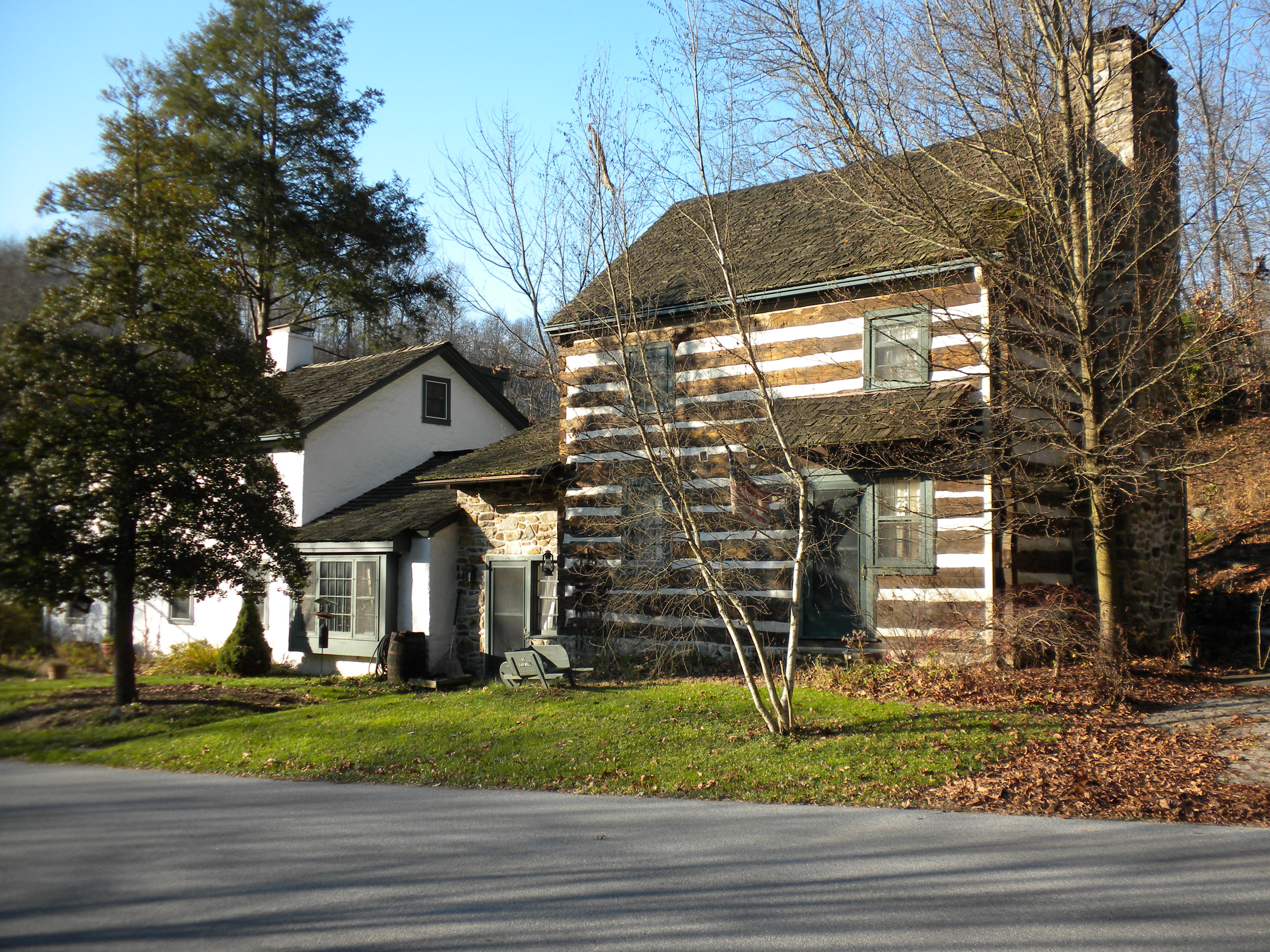

- Location within Pennsylvania Location within the United States
- Location: Saw Mill Road near Coatesville, East Fallowfield Township, Pennsylvania
- Coordinates: 39°57′24″N 75°46′47″W
- Area: 1 acre (0.40 ha)
- Built: c. 1800
- MPS: East Fallowfield Township MRAEast Fallowfield Township MRA
- NRHP reference No.: 85001152
- Added to NRHP: May 20, 1985

Joshua Pusey House is a historic home located in East Fallowfield Township, Chester County, Pennsylvania. The house was built about 1800, and is a two-story, four-bay, stuccoed stone dwelling with a gable roof. It has a one-story kitchen wing with a bay window.

It was added to the National Register of Historic Places in 1985.
