= Brandywine Building and Loan Assoc. Rowhouses =

Historic houses in Pennsylvania, United States

- U.S. National Register of Historic Places
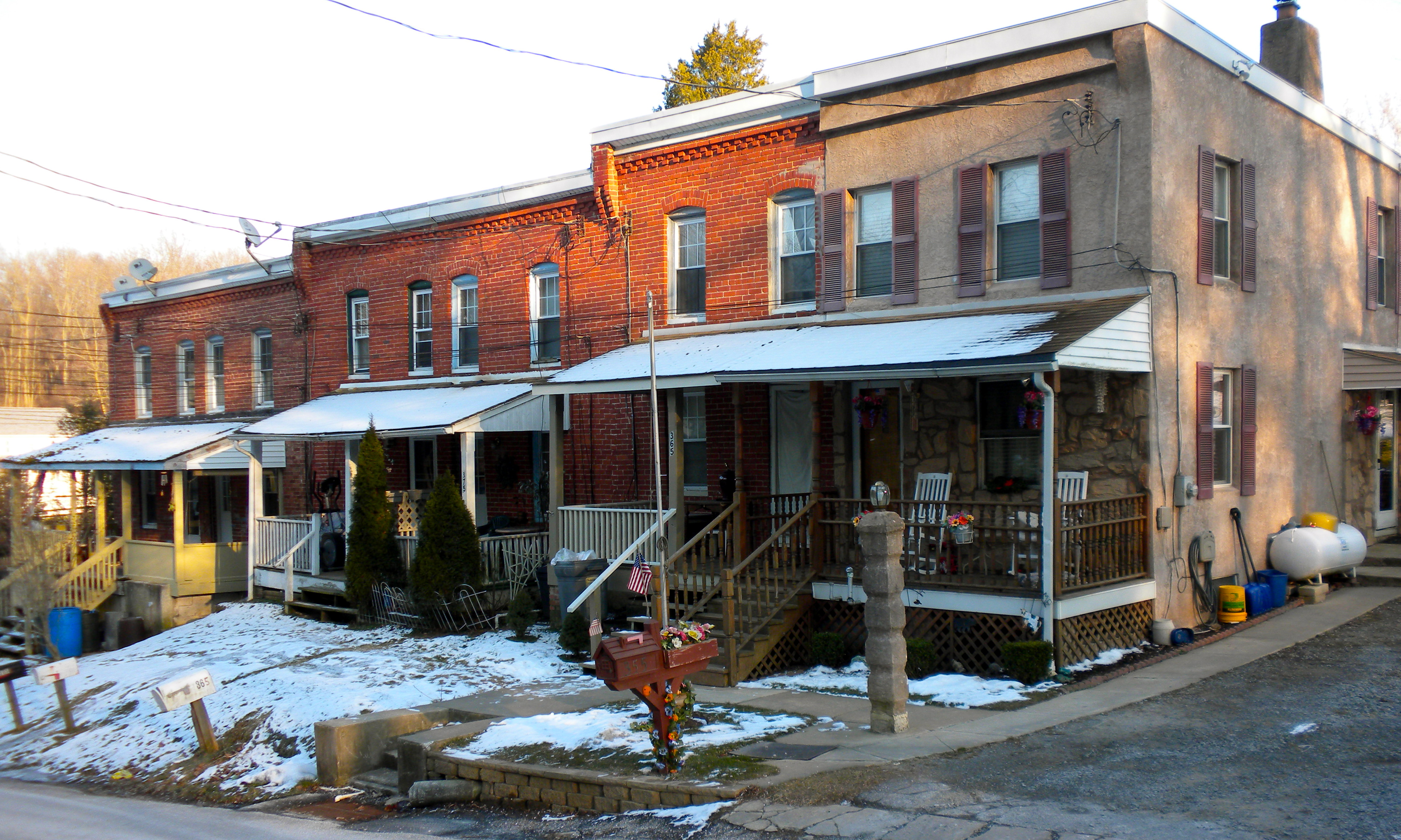
- Brandywine Row Houses, January 2010

- Location within Pennsylvania Location within the United States
- Location: Hephzibah Hill Road near Coatesville, East Fallowfield Township, Pennsylvania
- Coordinates: 39°57′13″N 75°48′24″W
- Area: 0.3 acres (0.12 ha)
- Built: 1913
- Architectural style: Italianate
- MPS: East Fallowfield Township MRAEast Fallowfield Township MRA
- NRHP reference No.: 85001144
- Added to NRHP: May 20, 1985

Brandywine Building and Loan Assoc. Rowhouses is a set of six historic rowhouses located in East Fallowfield Township, Chester County, Pennsylvania. They were built in 1913, and consist of six two-story, two bay rowhouse dwellings. They are constructed of brick and are in the Italianate style.

It was added to the National Register of Historic Places in 1985.
