= Kennett Square Historic District =

Historic district in Pennsylvania, United States

- U.S. National Register of Historic Places
- U.S. Historic district
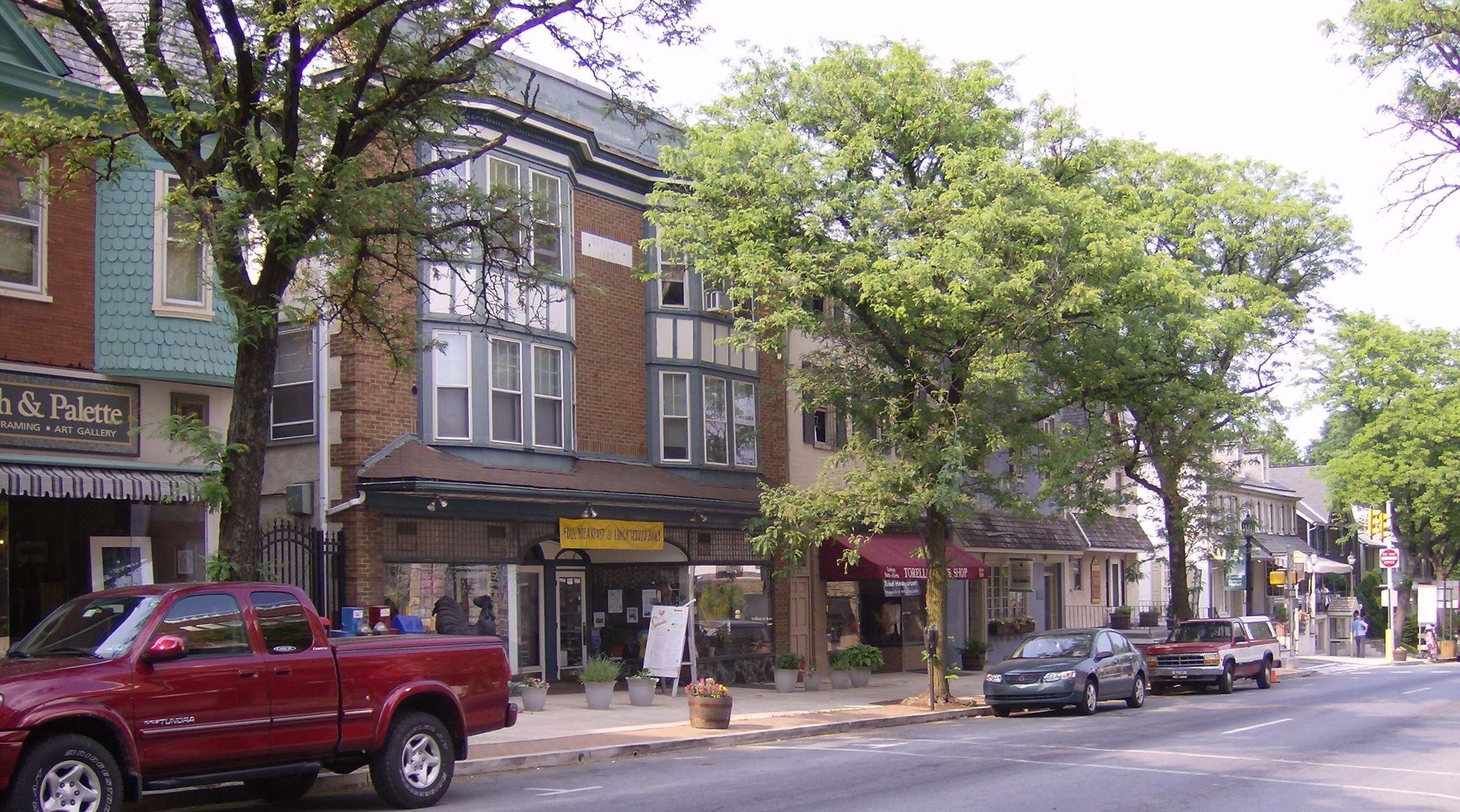
- Kennett Square Historic District, May 2007

- Location within Pennsylvania Location within the United States
- Location: Roughly bounded by Sickles, Willow, Mullberry, Broad, South, Union, Cedar, Lafayette, State, and Washington, Kennett Square, Pennsylvania
- Coordinates: 39°50′41″N 75°42′44″W
- Area: 137 acres (55 ha)
- Built: 1855
- Architect: Multiple
- Architectural style: Colonial Revival, Late Victorian, Federal
- NRHP reference No.: 89001052
- Added to NRHP: August 18, 1989

The Kennett Square Historic District is a national historic district that is located in Kennett Square, Chester County, Pennsylvania.

It was added to the National Register of Historic Places in 1989.

== History and architectural features ==
This district encompasses 507 contributing buildings that are located in the central business district and surrounding residential areas of Kennett Square. They are mostly residential and commercial structures that were built between 1875 and 1924 in a variety of popular architectural styles, including Colonial Revival, Victorian, and Federal. Notable non-residential buildings include the American Road Machinery complex, Kennett Consolidated School, New Century Club, Baptist church, St. Patrick's Parochial School, former Episcopal Church of the Advent, Friends Home, Bernard Building, Chalfont House and Municipal Building.
