= Rev. Joshua Vaughan House =

Historic house in Pennsylvania, United States

- U.S. National Register of Historic Places
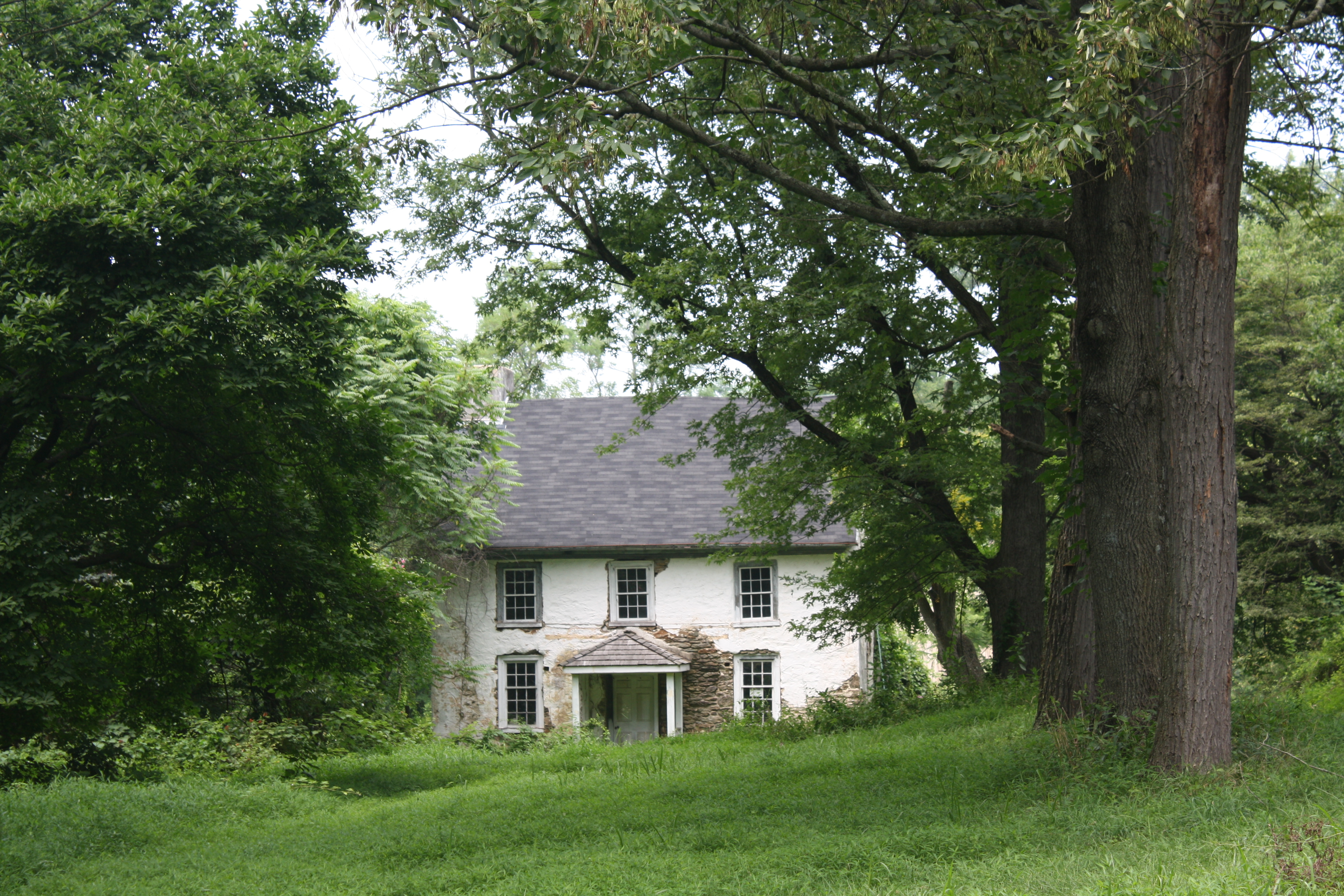
- Rev. Joshua Vaughan House. July 2013.

- Location within Pennsylvania Location within the United States
- Location: Strasburg Road near Coatesville, East Fallowfield Township, Pennsylvania
- Coordinates: 39°57′3″N 75°48′54″W
- Area: 1.4 acres (0.57 ha)
- Built: 1796
- Architectural style: Colonial English
- MPS: Strasburg Road TR;East Fallowfield Township MRA
- NRHP reference No.: 85002395
- Added to NRHP: September 18, 1985

Rev. Joshua Vaughan House is a historic home located in East Fallowfield Township, Chester County, Pennsylvania. It was built in 1796, and is a two-story, three-bay, stuccoed stone dwelling with a gable roof. It is representative of an English Colonial farmhouse.

It was added to the National Register of Historic Places in 1985.
