= Worker's House at Lower Laurel Iron Works =

Historic house in Pennsylvania, United States

- U.S. National Register of Historic Places
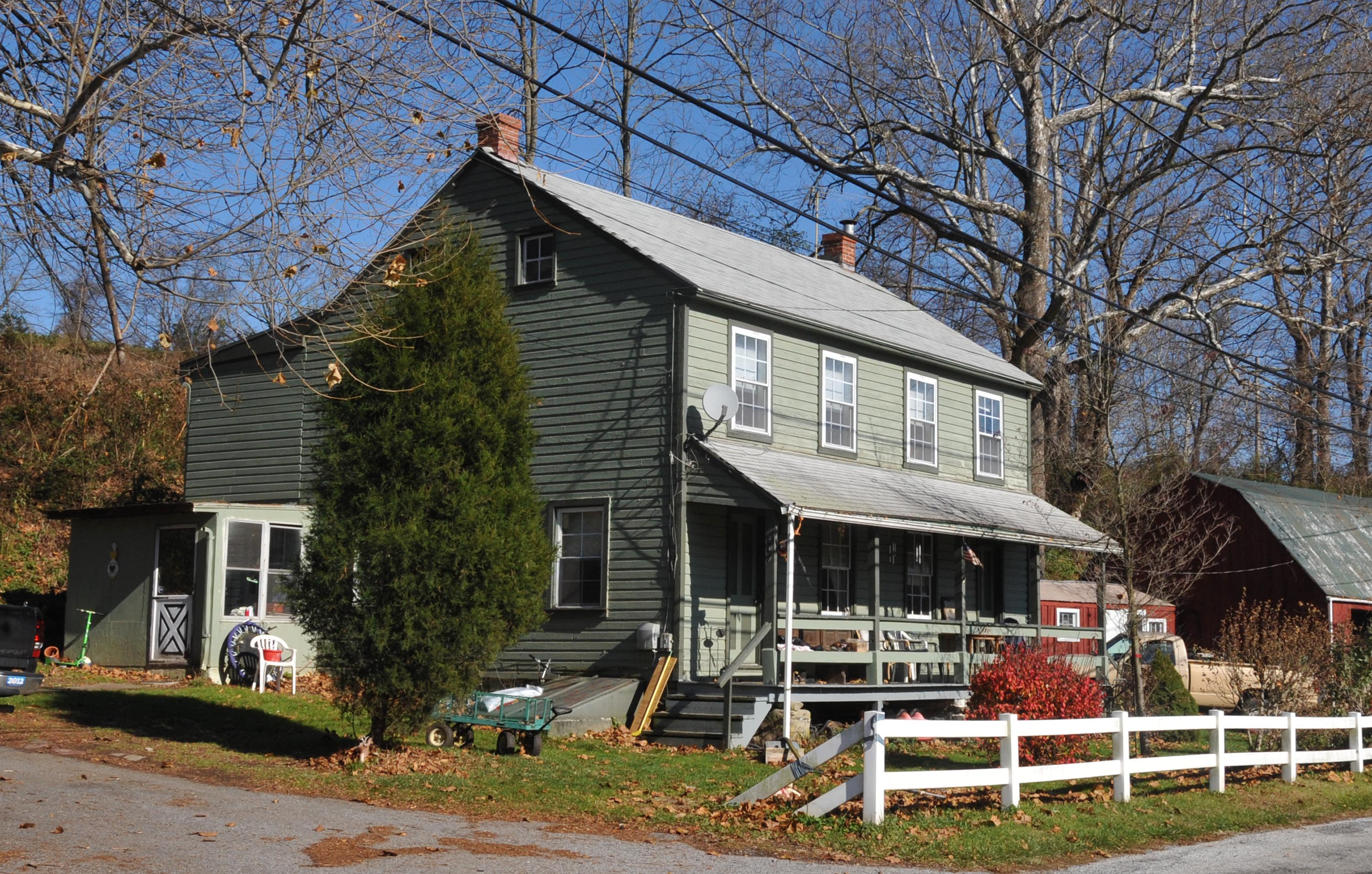
- Worker's House at Lower Laurel Iron Works, November 2012

- Location within Pennsylvania Location within the United States
- Location: Creek Rd., Newlin Township, Pennsylvania
- Coordinates: 39°56′14″N 75°46′8″W
- Area: 1.5 acres (0.61 ha)
- Built: c. 1870
- MPS: West Branch Brandywine Creek MRA
- NRHP reference No.: 85002381
- Added to NRHP: September 16, 1985

The Worker's House at Lower Laurel Iron Works is an historic double house in Newlin Township, Chester County, Pennsylvania, United States.

It was added to the National Register of Historic Places in 1985.

== History and architectural features ==
Built circa 1870, this historic structure is a two-story, four-bay, frame, two-family dwelling with German siding, a gable roof, a full basement, and an attic. It also has a two-story, shed-roofed, rear addition and features a full-width front porch. It is the only remaining worker's house built by Hugh E. Steele and associated with the Lower Laurel Iron Works.
