= White Horse Tavern (Coatesville, Pennsylvania) =

- U.S. National Register of Historic Places
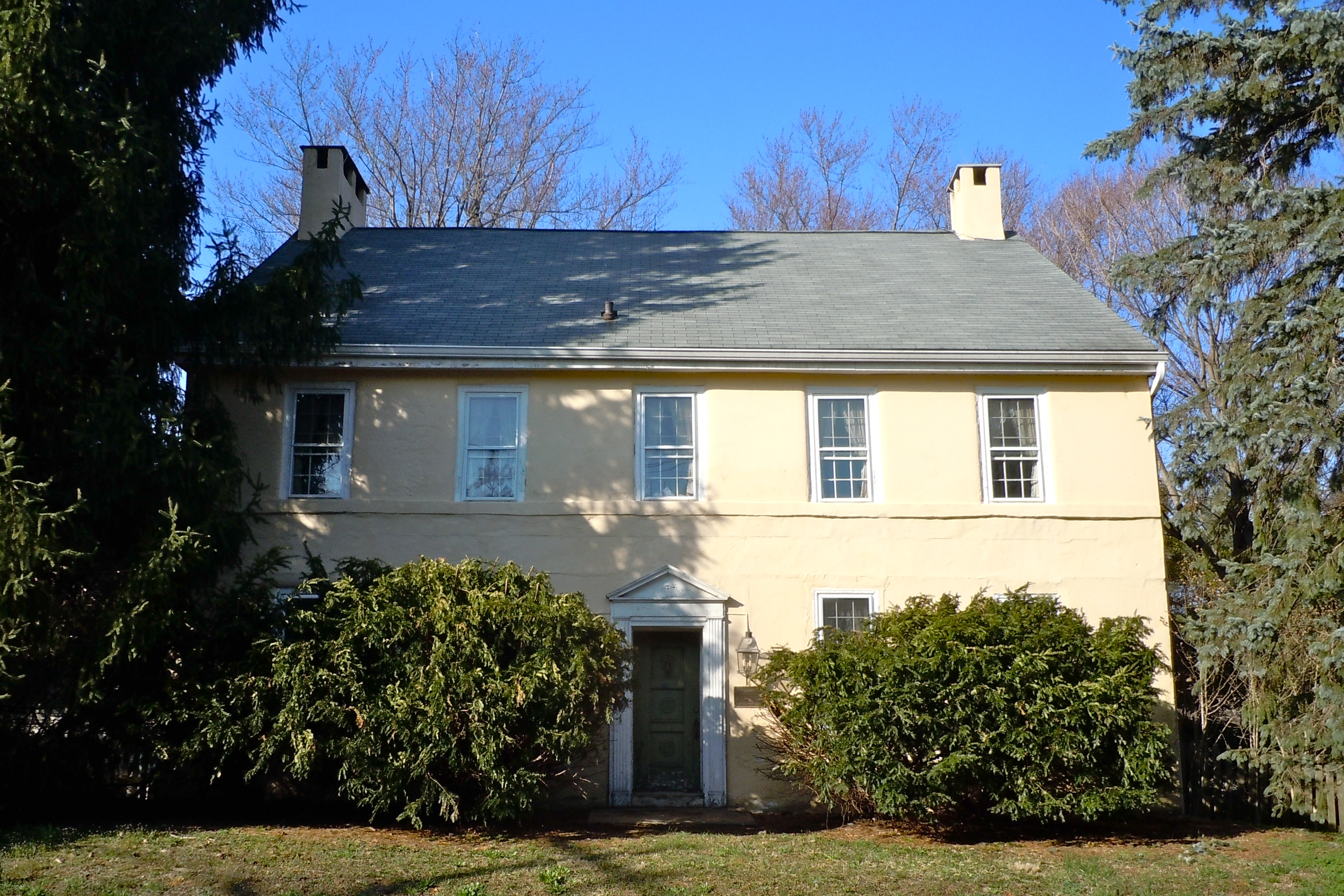
- White Horse Tavern, March 2011

- Location within Pennsylvania Location within the United States
- Location: Strasburg Road near Coatesville, East Fallowfield Township, Pennsylvania
- Coordinates: 39°57′2″N 75°49′11″W
- Area: 0.8 acres (0.32 ha)
- Built: 1816
- Architectural style: Federal
- MPS: Strasburg Road TR;East Fallowfield Township MRA
- NRHP reference No.: 85002397
- Added to NRHP: September 18, 1985

White Horse Tavern is a historic inn and tavern located in East Fallowfield Township, Chester County, Pennsylvania, United States. It was built in 1816, and is a two-story, five-bay, stuccoed stone building with a gable roof in the Federal style. It features a formal pedimented entrance. The tavern was built for Robert Young, who also built the Robert Young House located across the intersection.

It was added to the National Register of Historic Places in 1985.
