= East Fallowfield Township, Chester County, Pennsylvania =

Township in Pennsylvania, US

East Fallowfield Township
- Township
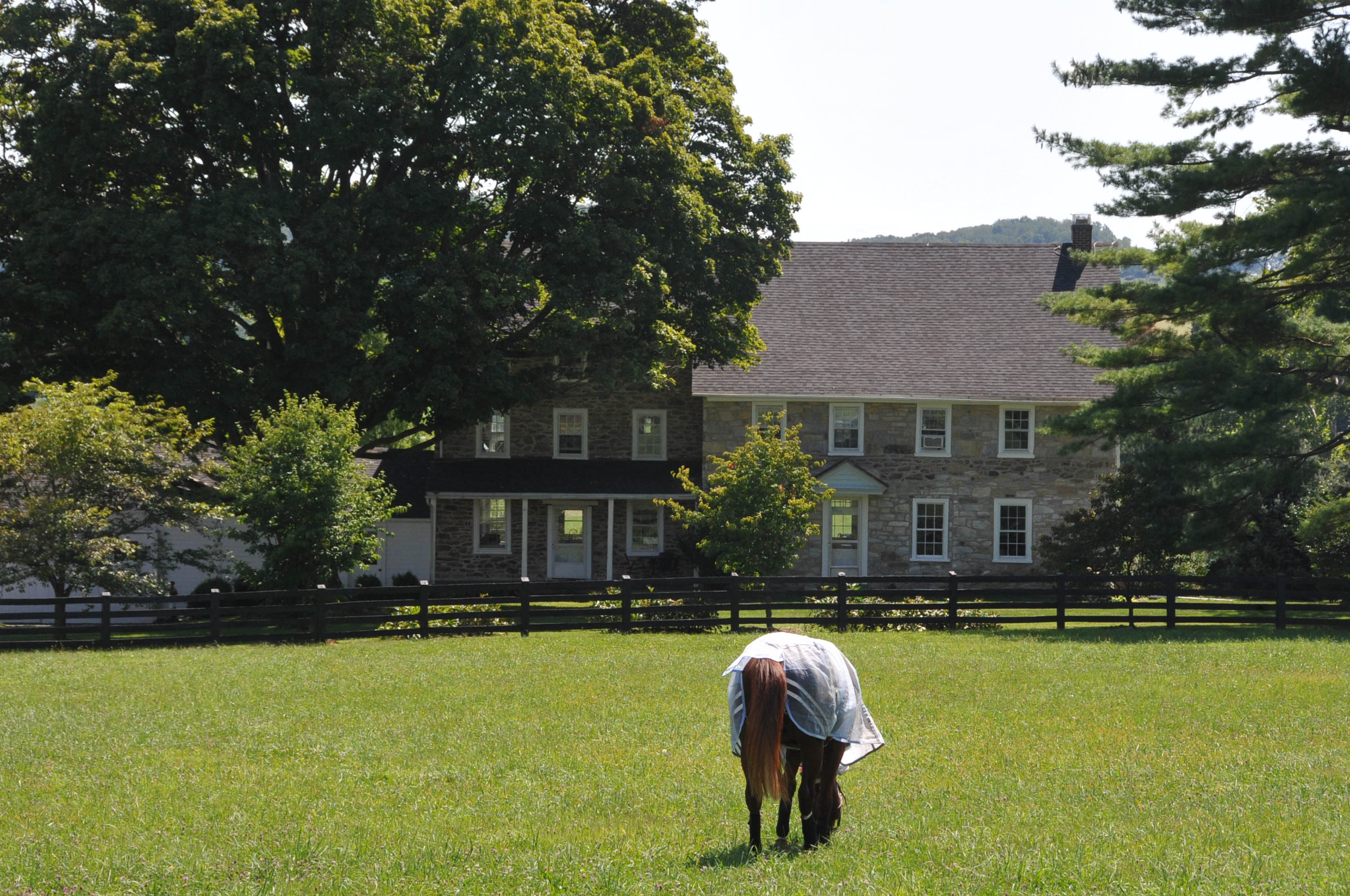
- Powell Farm

- Seal

- Location in Chester County and the U.S. state of Pennsylvania.
- Coordinates: 39°57′00″N 75°48′38″W
- Country: United States
- State: Pennsylvania
- County: Chester

Area
  - Total: 15.61 sq mi (40.44 km^{2})
  - Land: 15.51 sq mi (40.17 km^{2})
  - Water: 0.10 sq mi (0.27 km^{2})
- Elevation: 515 ft (157 m)

Population (2020)
  - Total: 7,625
  - Density: 491.6/sq mi (189.8/km^{2})
- Time zone: UTC-5 (EST)
  - Summer (DST): UTC-4 (EDT)
- Area code: 610
- FIPS code: 42-029-21104
- Website: www.eastfallowfield.org

East Fallowfield Township is a township in Chester County, Pennsylvania, United States. The population was 7,626 at the 2020 census.

== History ==
East Fallowfield is said to be named for Lancelot Fallowfield, one of the first purchasers of land from William Penn.

The Nelson P. Boyer Barn was listed on the National Register of Historic Places in 1985, and delisted in 1991 after demolition. The John Bailey Farm, Brandywine Building and Loan Assoc. Rowhouses, Bridge in East Fallowfield Township, Harry DeHaven House, Edward Dougherty House, Philip Dougherty House, Philip Dougherty Tavern, Drovers Inn, Ercildoun Historic District, Joseph Gladden House, Glen Rose Historic District, John Hanna Farm, Mortonville Hotel, Mansel Passmore House, Isaac Pawling House, Martha Pennock House, Lukens Pierce House, Powell Farm, John Powell House, Joshua Pusey House, David Scott House, Thomas Scott House, Speakman No. 1, Speakman No. 2, Mary Ann Pyle Bridge, Robert Steen House, Rev. Joshua Vaughan House, Asa Walton House, John Wentz House, White Horse Tavern, Robert Wilson House, and Robert Young House are listed on the National Register of Historic Places.

== Geography ==
According to the U.S. Census Bureau, the township has a total area of 15.7 square miles (41 km^{2}), all land.

=== Adjacent townships ===
Seven townships share boundaries with East Fallowfield Township. They are:

- Caln Township (northeast)
- West Bradford Township (east)
- Newlin Township (southeast)
- West Marlborough Township (south)
- Highland Township (west)
- Sadsbury Township (northwest)
- Valley Township (north)

East Fallowfield Township also shares boundaries with the boroughs of Modena and South Coatesville.

== Demographics ==
Historical population
Census	Pop.	Note	%±
1930	1,406		—
1940	1,542		9.7%
1950	1,795		16.4%
1960	2,745		52.9%
1970	3,487		27.0%
1980	3,962		13.6%
1990	4,433		11.9%
2000	5,157		16.3%
2010	7,449		44.4%
2020	7,625		2.4%
2023 (est.)	7,866		3.2%

At the 2010 census, the township was 82.4% non-Hispanic White, 9.3% Black or African American, 0.1% Native American, 1.8% Asian, and 2.3% were two or more races. 4.6% of the population were of Hispanic or Latino ancestry.

At the 2000 census there were 5,157 people, 1,801 households, and 1,458 families living in the township. The population density was 328.9 inhabitants per square mile (127.0/km^{2}). There were 1,860 housing units at an average density of 118.6 per square mile (45.8/km^{2}). The racial makeup of the township was 88.38% White, 9.13% African American, 0.14% Native American, 0.43% Asian, 0.12% Pacific Islander, 0.47% from other races, and 1.34% from two or more races. Hispanic or Latino of any race were 1.69%.

There were 1,801 households, 37.3% had children under the age of 18 living with them, 69.1% were married couples living together, 7.4% had a female householder with no husband present, and 19.0% were non-families. 15.5% of households were made up of individuals, and 5.7% were one person aged 65 or older. The average household size was 2.82 and the average family size was 3.14.

The age distribution was 27.7% under the age of 18, 6.5% from 18 to 24, 30.1% from 25 to 44, 25.0% from 45 to 64, and 10.8% 65 or older. The median age was 38 years. For every 100 females, there were 101.0 males. For every 100 females age 18 and over, there were 97.2 males.

The median household income was $60,902 and the median family income was $66,619. Males had a median income of $42,731 versus $30,545 for females. The per capita income for the township was $25,376. About 2.2% of families and 3.8% of the population were below the poverty line, including 5.0% of those under age 18 and 6.8% of those age 65 or over.

== Transportation ==
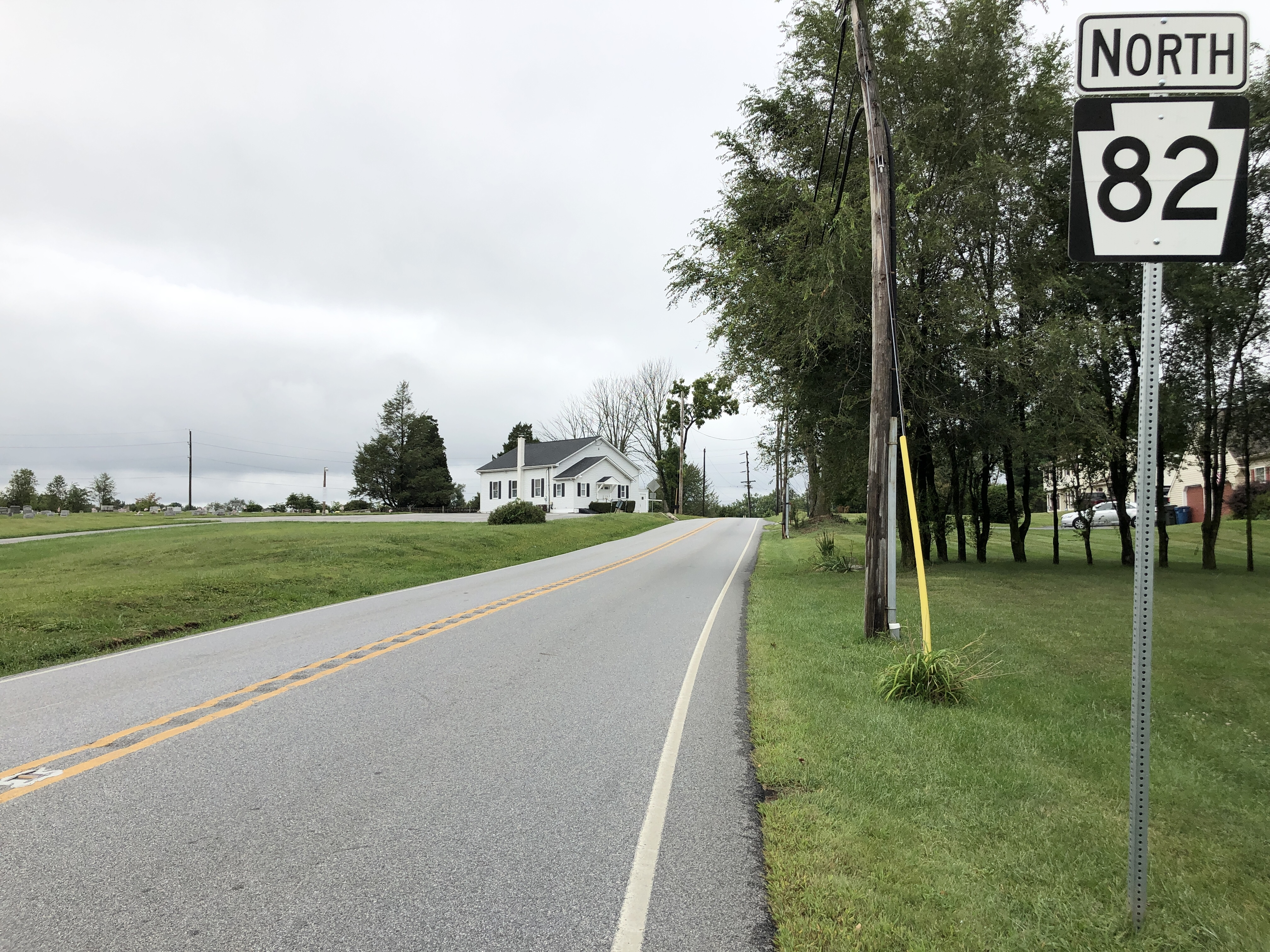
PA 82 northbound in East Fallowfield Township

As of 2018, there were 68.10 miles (109.60 km) of public roads in East Fallowfield Township, of which 13.26 miles (21.34 km) were maintained by the Pennsylvania Department of Transportation (PennDOT) and 54.84 miles (88.26 km) were maintained by the township.

Pennsylvania Route 82 is the only numbered highway serving East Fallowfield Township. It follows Doe Run Road along a north–south alignment across the west-central portion of the township.
