= Robert Wilson House =

Historic house in Pennsylvania, United States

- U.S. National Register of Historic Places
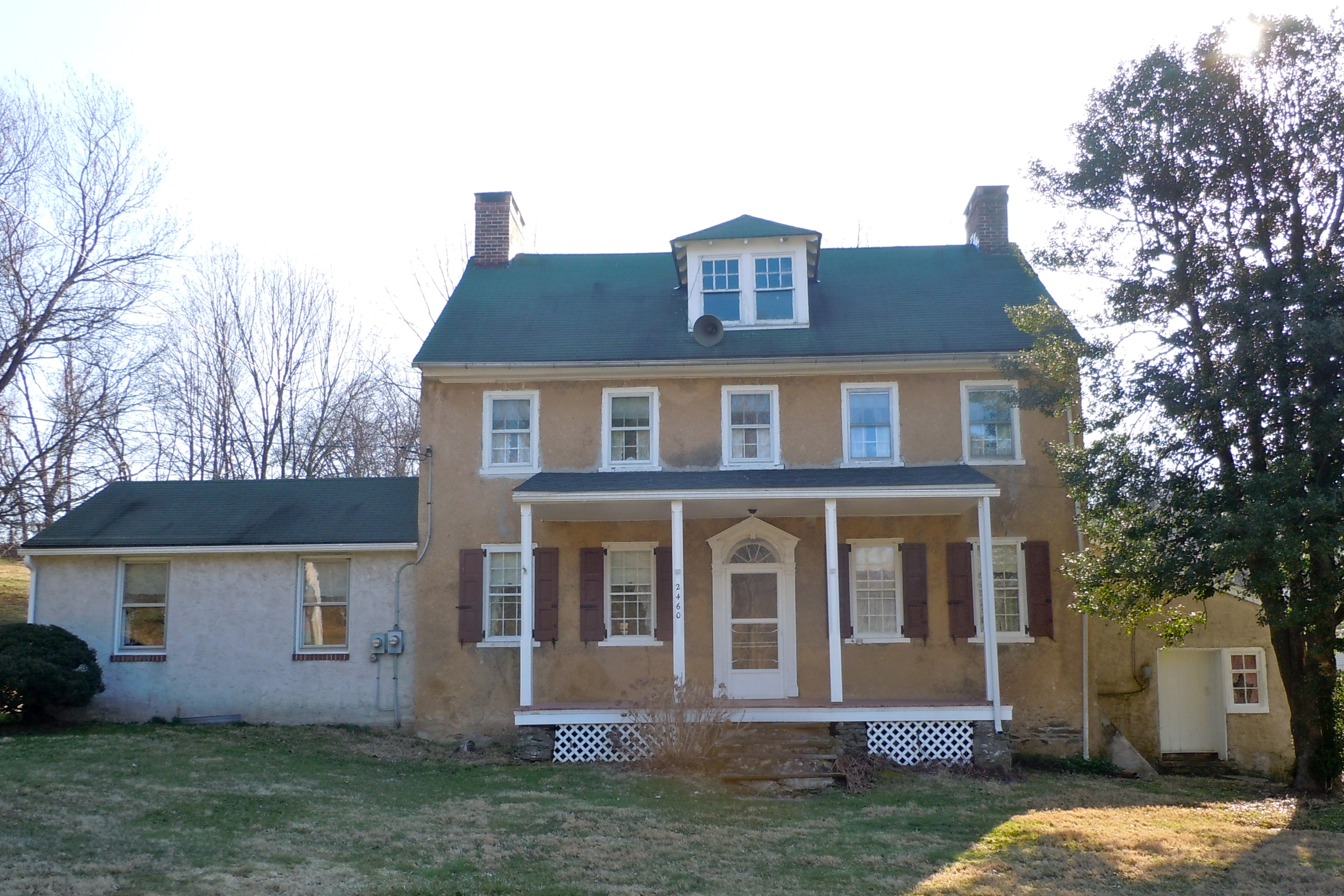
- Robert Wilson House, March 2011

- Location within Pennsylvania Location within the United States
- Location: Strasburg Road near Coatesville, East Fallowfield Township, Pennsylvania
- Coordinates: 39°57′9″N 75°50′32″W
- Area: 2 acres (0.81 ha)
- Built: 1823
- Architectural style: Federal
- MPS: Strasburg Road TR;East Fallowfield Township MRA
- NRHP reference No.: 85002398
- Added to NRHP: September 18, 1985

Robert Wilson House is a historic home located in East Fallowfield Township, Chester County, Pennsylvania. It was built in 1823, and is a two-story, five-bay, stuccoed stone dwelling with a gable roof. The house has small wings on both sides. It features a formal entryway with pilasters and an elliptical fanlight. It is representative of a Federal style farmhouse.

It was added to the National Register of Historic Places in 1985.
