= Mansel Passmore House =

Historic house in Pennsylvania, United States

- U.S. National Register of Historic Places
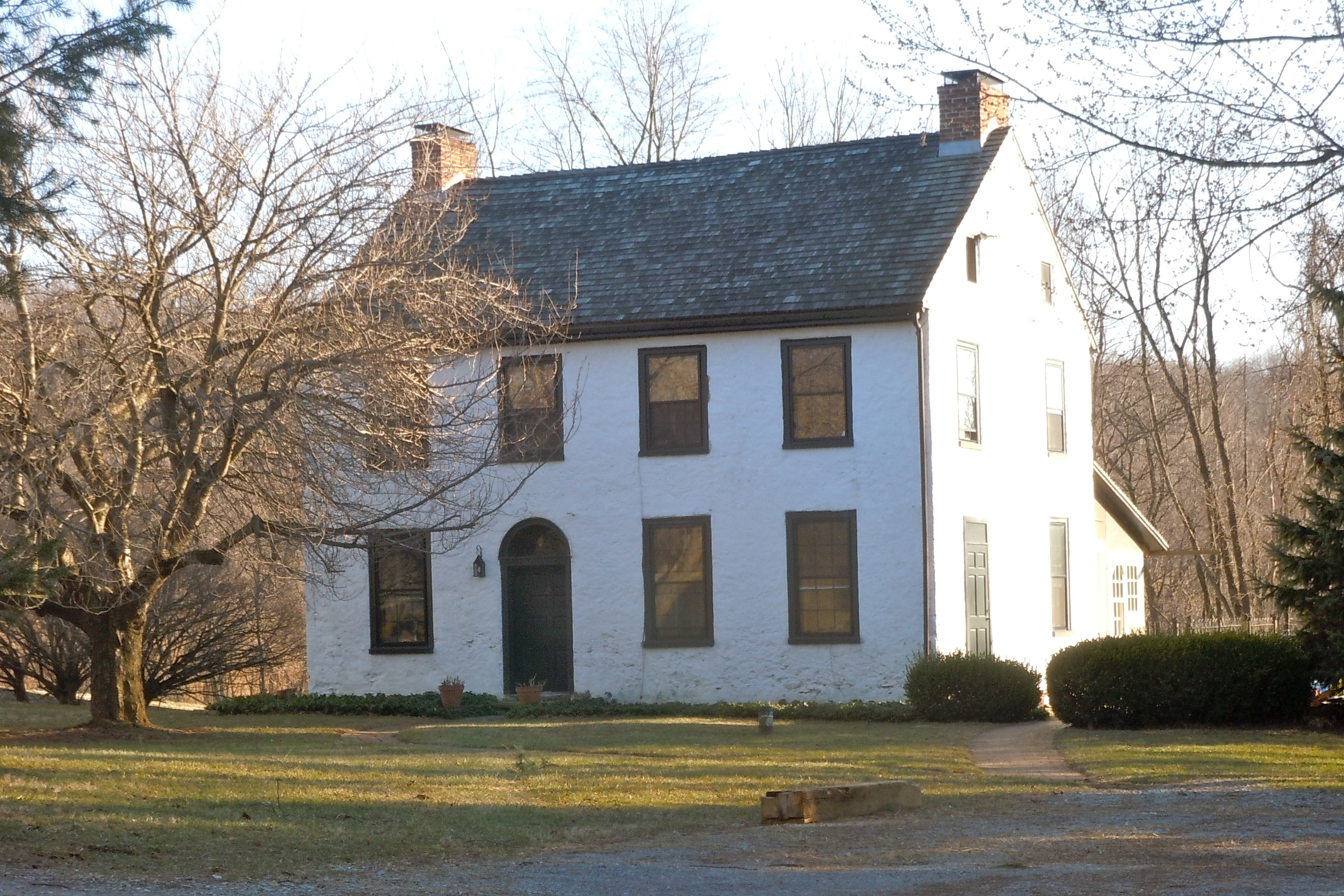
- Mansel Passmore House, March 2011

- Location within Pennsylvania Location within the United States
- Location: Glen Rose Road near Coatesville, East Fallowfield Township, Pennsylvania
- Coordinates: 39°56′25″N 75°51′6″W
- Area: 3 acres (1.2 ha)
- Built: c. 1830
- Architectural style: Federal, Vernacular Federal
- MPS: East Fallowfield Township MRAEast Fallowfield Township MRA
- NRHP reference No.: 85001148
- Added to NRHP: May 20, 1985

Mansel Passmore House is a historic home located in East Fallowfield Township, Chester County, Pennsylvania. It was built about 1830, and is a two-story, four-bay, stuccoed stone Federal style dwelling. It features an elliptical fanlight over the offcentered main entrance.

It was added to the National Register of Historic Places in 1985.
