= Mortonville Hotel =

- U.S. National Register of Historic Places
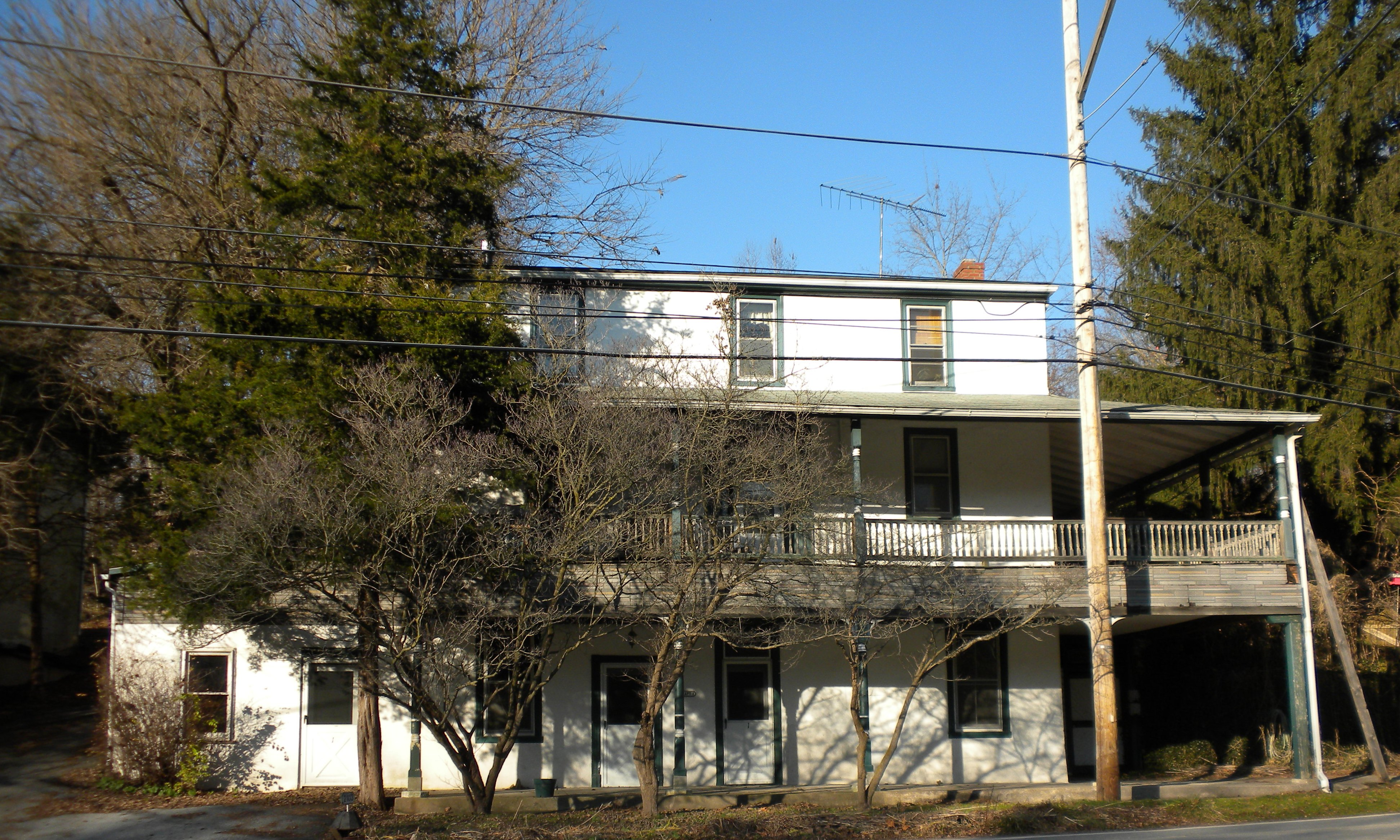
- Mortonville Hotel, December 2009

- Location within Pennsylvania Location within the United States
- Location: Strasburg Road near Coatesville, East Fallowfield Township, Pennsylvania
- Coordinates: 39°56′49″N 75°46′41″W
- Area: 1 acre (0.40 ha)
- Built: 1796, 1849
- Architectural style: Federal
- MPS: Strasburg Road TR;East Fallowfield Township MRA
- NRHP reference No.: 85002393
- Added to NRHP: September 18, 1985

Mortonville Hotel is a historic hotel located in East Fallowfield Township, Chester County, Pennsylvania. It was built in 1796 as a dwelling, and converted to a hotel in 1849. It is a three-story, seven-bay, stuccoed stone structure with a shallow gable roof. It is partially banked, and features first and second floor verandahs.

It was added to the National Register of Historic Places in 1985.
