= David Scott House =

Historic house in Pennsylvania, United States

- U.S. National Register of Historic Places
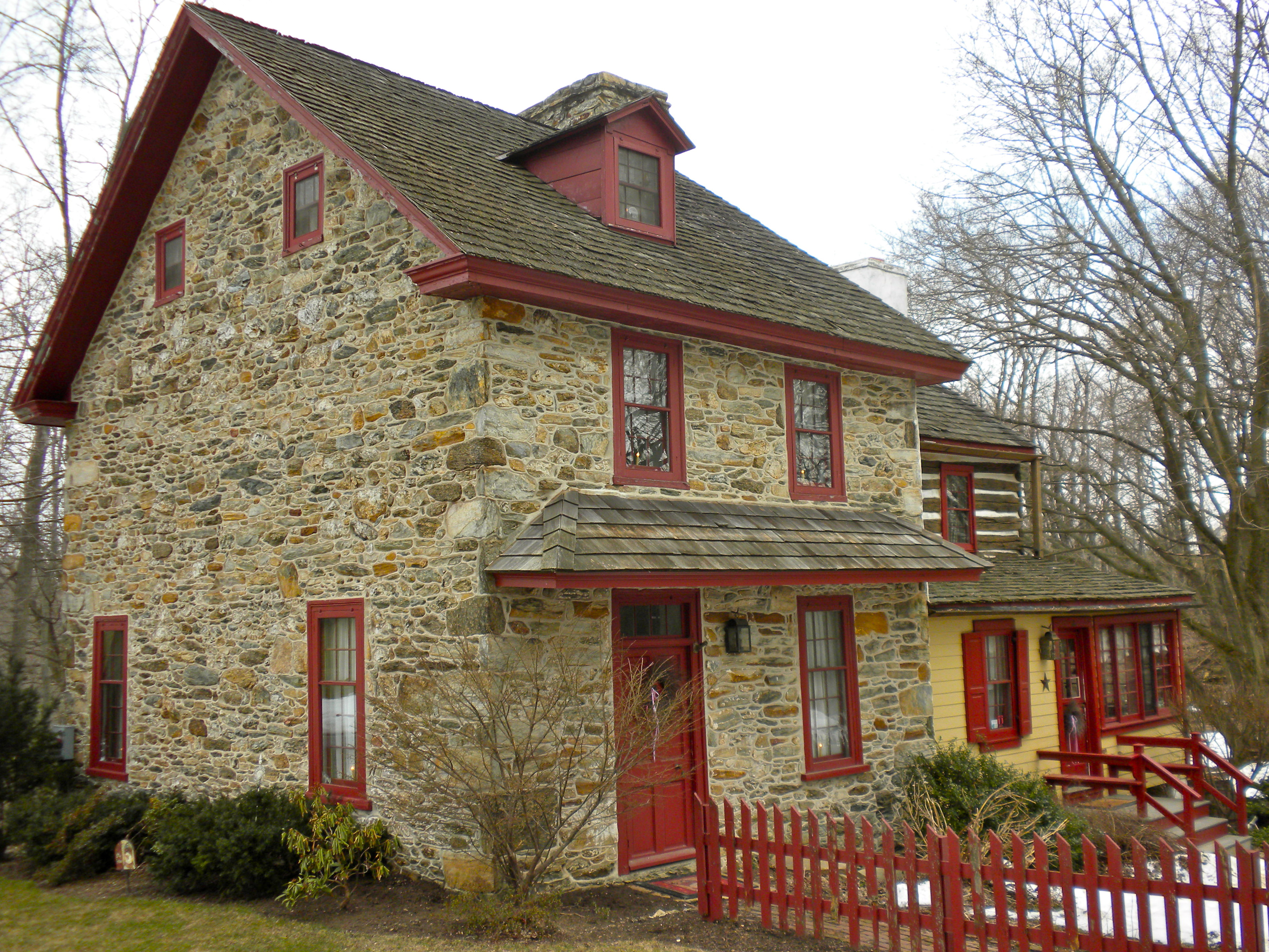
- David Scott House, March 2010

- Location within Pennsylvania Location within the United States
- Location: Mt. Carmel Road near Coatesville, East Fallowfield Township, Pennsylvania
- Coordinates: 39°57′35″N 75°51′41″W
- Area: 1.1 acres (0.45 ha)
- Built: c. 1800
- Architectural style: Penn Plan
- MPS: East Fallowfield Township MRAEast Fallowfield Township MRA
- NRHP reference No.: 85001153
- Added to NRHP: May 20, 1985

David Scott House is a historic home located in East Fallowfield Township, Chester County, Pennsylvania. The house was built about 1800, and is a two-story, two-bay, fieldstone Penn Plan style dwelling. It has a gable roof and a log addition built in the 1980s. The house stayed in the Scott family for over 160 years, until sold in 1965.

It was added to the National Register of Historic Places in 1985.
