= Thomas Scott House (Coatesville, Pennsylvania) =

Historic house in Pennsylvania, United States

- U.S. National Register of Historic Places
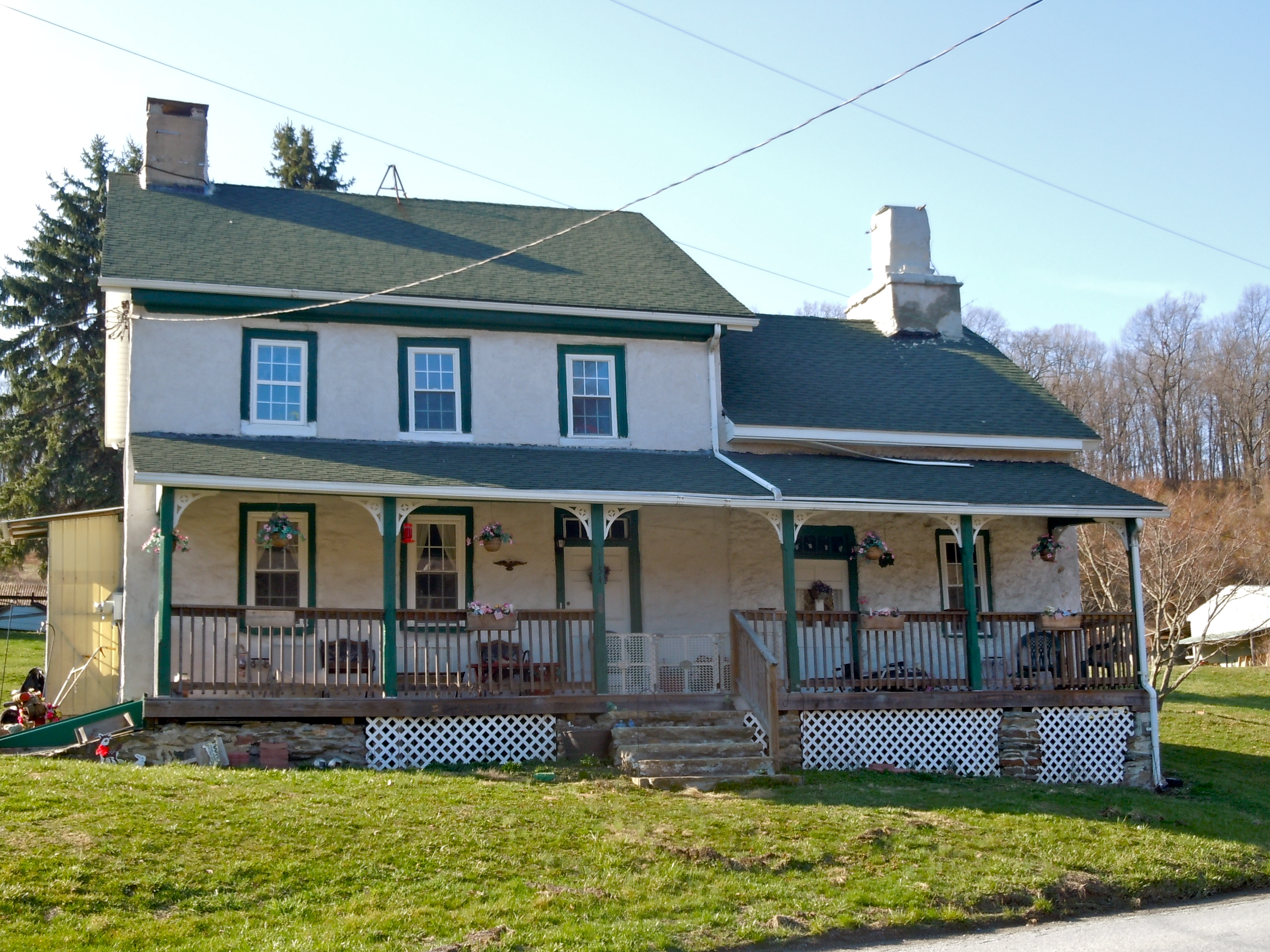
- Thomas Scott House, March 2011

- Location within Pennsylvania Location within the United States
- Location: Park Avenue near Coatesville, East Fallowfield Township, Pennsylvania
- Coordinates: 39°57′55″N 75°51′9″W
- Area: 0.5 acres (0.20 ha)
- Built: c. 1796
- Architectural style: Federal, Vernacular Federal
- MPS: East Fallowfield Township MRAEast Fallowfield Township MRA
- NRHP reference No.: 85001154
- Added to NRHP: May 20, 1985

Thomas Scott House is a historic home located in East Fallowfield Township, Chester County, Pennsylvania. The house was built about 1796, and is a two-story, three-bay, stuccoed stone, vernacular Federal style dwelling. It has a one-story stone addition and full-width front porch with Eastlake brackets.

It was added to the National Register of Historic Places in 1985.
