= John Powell House =

Historic house in Pennsylvania, United States

- U.S. National Register of Historic Places
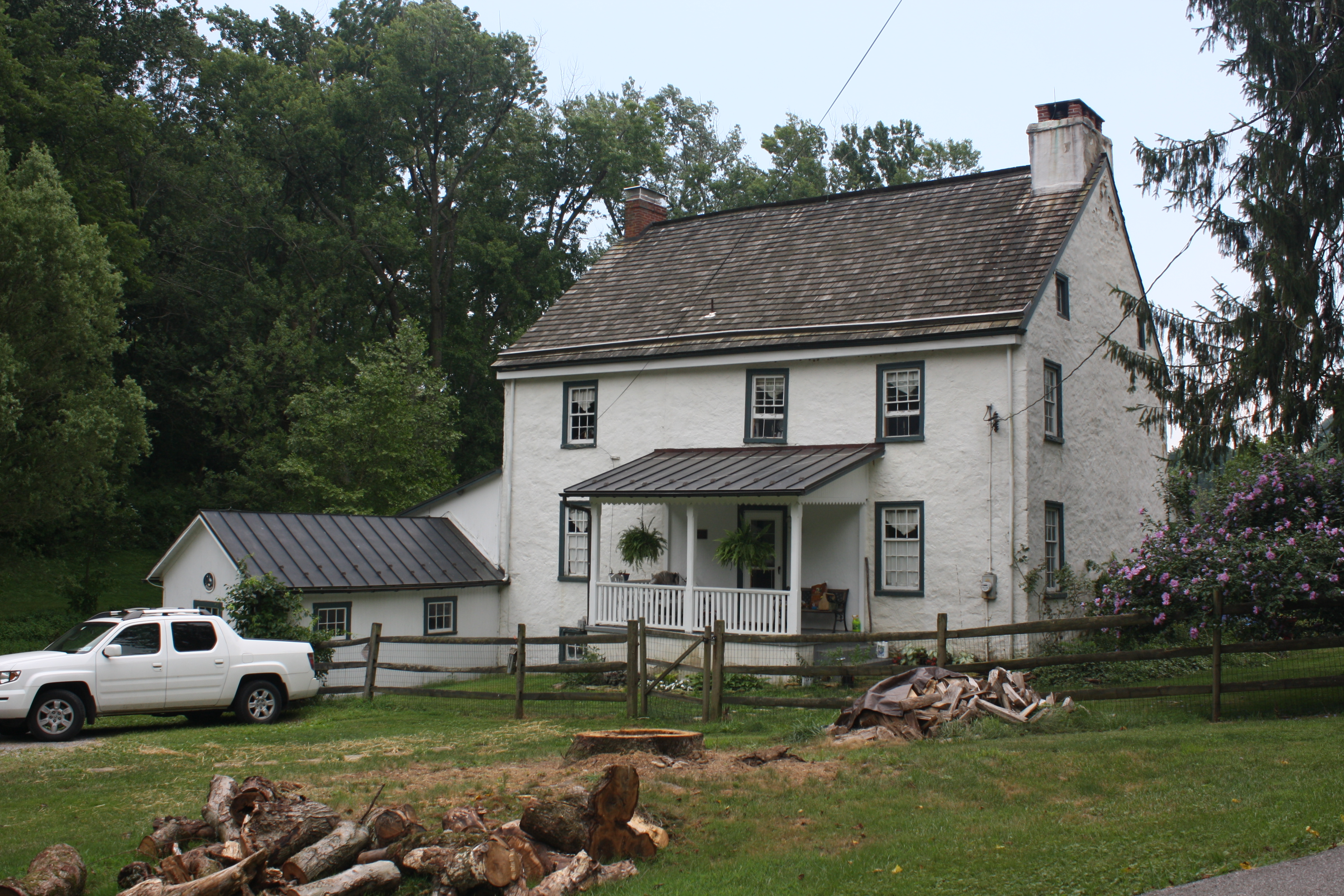
- John Powell House, July 2013

- Location within Pennsylvania Location within the United States
- Location: Hephzibah Hill Road near Coatesville, East Fallowfield Township, Pennsylvania
- Coordinates: 39°56′16″N 75°48′50″W
- Area: 0.3 acres (0.12 ha)
- Built: c. 1796
- Architectural style: Federal, Vernacular Federal
- MPS: East Fallowfield Township MRAEast Fallowfield Township MRA
- NRHP reference No.: 85001151
- Added to NRHP: May 20, 1985

John Powell House is a historic home located in East Fallowfield Township, Chester County, Pennsylvania, United States. The house was built about 1796, and is a two-story, five-bay, stuccoed stone vernacular Federal style dwelling. It has a gable roof and a full-width front porch.

It was added to the National Register of Historic Places in 1985.
