= Powell Farm (Coatesville, Pennsylvania) =

Historic house in Pennsylvania, United States

- U.S. National Register of Historic Places
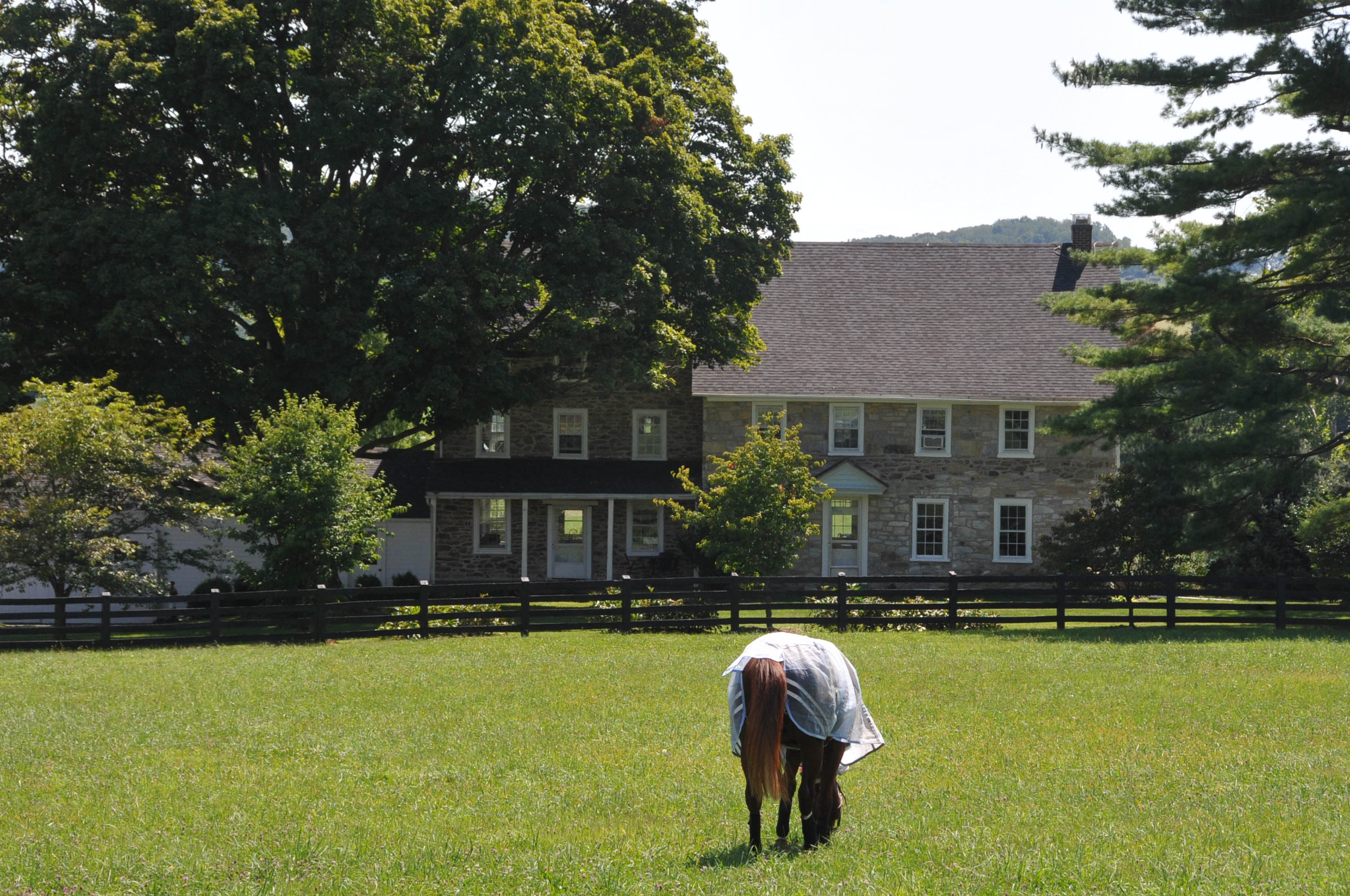

- Location within Pennsylvania Location within the United States
- Location: Dupont Road near Coatesville, East Fallowfield Township, Pennsylvania
- Coordinates: 39°56′13″N 75°48′29″W
- Area: 0.7 acres (0.28 ha)
- Built: 1794
- Architectural style: Federal, Vernacular Federal
- MPS: East Fallowfield Township MRAEast Fallowfield Township MRA
- NRHP reference No.: 85001150
- Added to NRHP: May 20, 1985

Powell Farm is a historic home located in East Fallowfield Township, Chester County, Pennsylvania. The house was built in 1794, and is a two-story, five-bay, fieldstone vernacular Federal style farmhouse. It has a gable roof and a full-width front porch.

It was added to the National Register of Historic Places in 1985.
