= House at Springdell =

Historic house in Pennsylvania, United States

- U.S. National Register of Historic Places
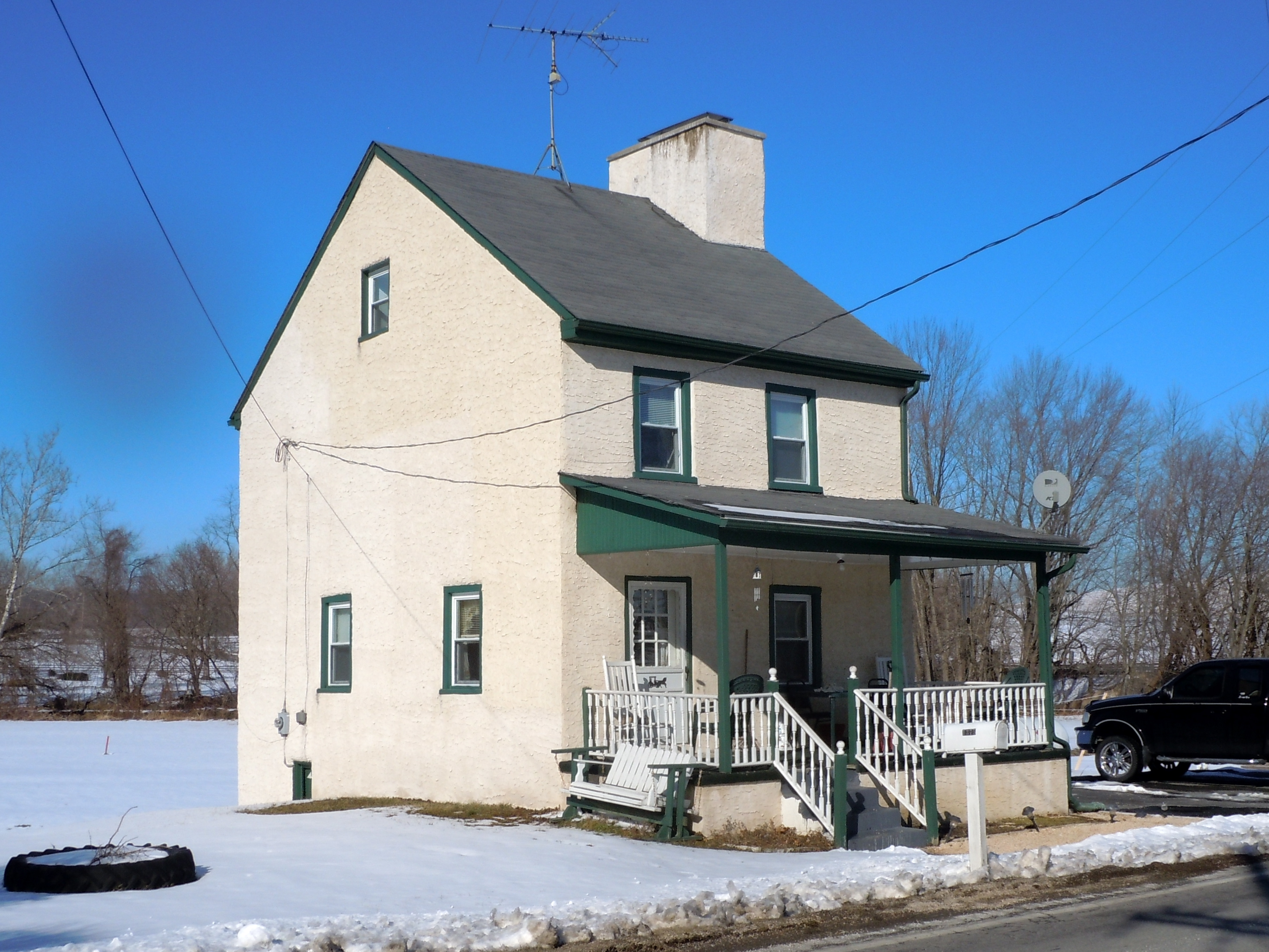
- View from the southwest

- Location within Pennsylvania Location within the United States
- Location: Rt. 841, West Marlborough Township, Pennsylvania
- Coordinates: 39°54′25″N 75°50′4″W
- Area: 1 acre (0.40 ha)
- Architect: Penn, William
- Architectural style: Penn Plan
- MPS: West Branch Brandywine Creek MRA
- NRHP reference No.: 85002360
- Added to NRHP: September 16, 1985

The House at Springdell is a house built in the eighteenth century in the tiny hamlet of Springdell, Pennsylvania in West Marlborough Township, Chester County. The house's design is essentially unaltered from the original "Penn Plan," which was a vernacular design advocated by William Penn about 1700 as an economical house adapted to his new proprietary colony. The remains of a mill's tail race can be seen in the back yard, with Doe Run Creek, a tributary of West Brandywine Creek, about 15 yards behind the house. The house was added to the National Register of Historic Places in 1985.

== Architecture ==
The house consists of a basement, which formerly served as a kitchen, and two stories with two rooms each, front and back. The exterior walls are stuccoed stone, the two interior walls are made of simple wooden planking. A steep winding stair centered on the west wall ascends from the basement to the second story. Each of the above-ground rooms has a fireplace, which are now closed off. Electricity and a furnace were installed in the house about 1950. A porch leads to the front (south) entrance. A door on the north wall leads to the basement.

== History ==
The hamlet of Springdell now includes about 18 houses, but previously had a station on the Pomeroy and Newark Railroad, post office, mill, and perhaps a dozen houses. The post office, which operated from 1893 to 1910, could not be named Springdell because another post office in Pennsylvania used that name. It was named Derbydown, according to local legend, following intense debate when a hat fell from a table.

During the American Revolution the house was used as a tenant house for the Passmore farm, and was reportedly occupied by the mother of James Fitzpatrick. James was a deserter from the Continental Army who was nearly captured at his mother's house. He later joined with the British Army under General Howe and fought in the nearby Battle of Brandywine. He then helped the British pillage the area. In September, 1778 he was captured and hung by the Continental Army.
