= West Marlborough Township, Pennsylvania =

Township in Pennsylvania, US

West Marlborough Township
- Township
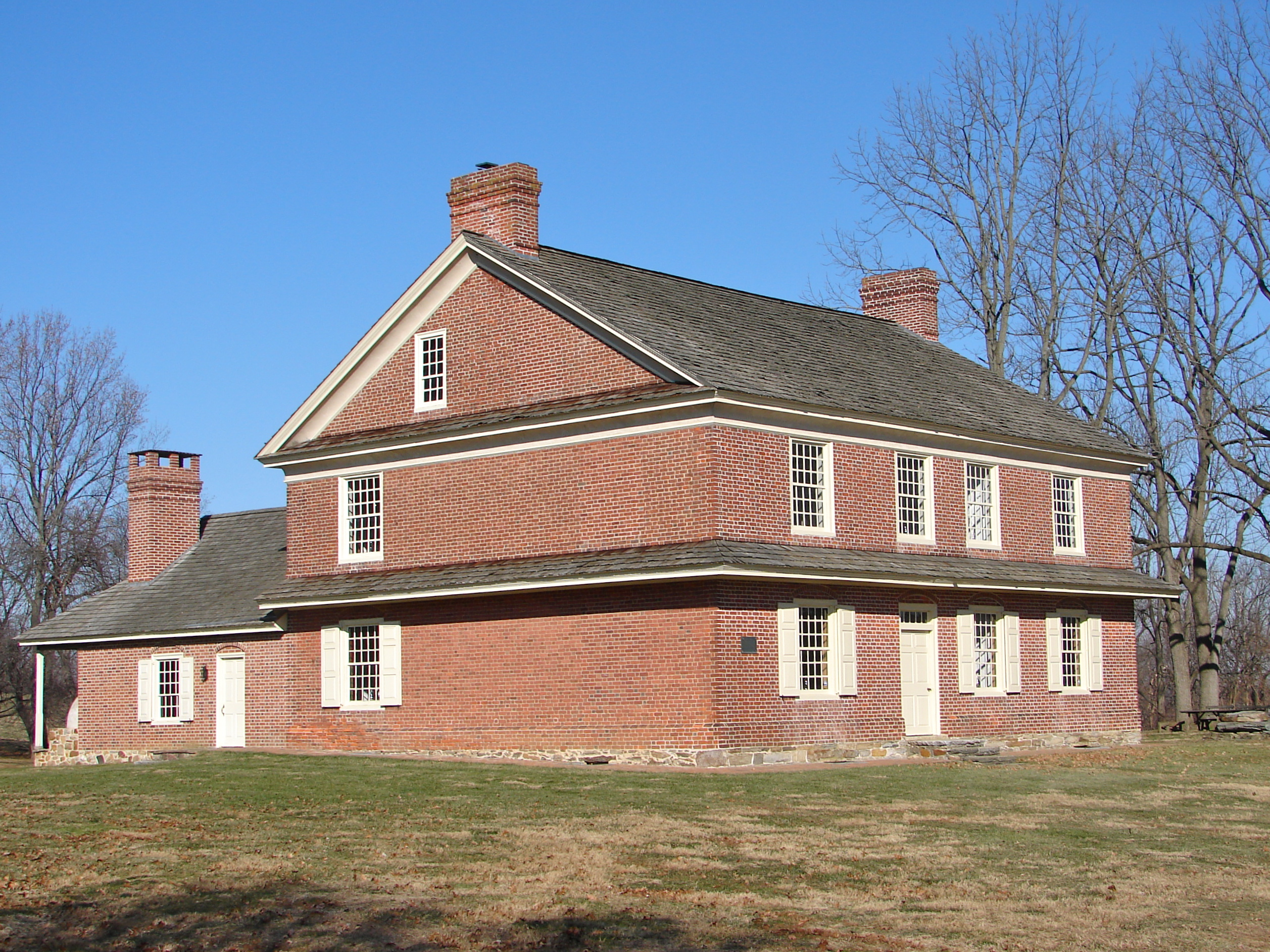
- Primitive Hall

- Location in Chester County and the state of Pennsylvania

- Location of Pennsylvania in the United States
- Coordinates: 39°53′33″N 75°48′36″W
- Country: United States
- State: Pennsylvania
- County: Chester

Area
  - Total: 17.08 sq mi (44.23 km^{2})
  - Land: 16.98 sq mi (43.99 km^{2})
  - Water: 0.093 sq mi (0.24 km^{2})
- Elevation: 509 ft (155 m)

Population (2010)
  - Total: 814
  - Estimate (2016): 816
  - Density: 48.0/sq mi (18.55/km^{2})
- Time zone: UTC-5 (EST)
  - Summer (DST): UTC-4 (EDT)
- Area code: 610
- FIPS code: 42-029-83464
- Website: https://www.westmarlboroughpa.gov/

West Marlborough Township is a township in Chester County, Pennsylvania, United States. The population was 814 at the 2010 census. East Marlborough and West Marlborough townships were carved out of the larger Marlborough Township in 1729.

West Marlborough Township is a second class township, governed by a three-member Board of Supervisors, who meet monthly at the township garage in the village of Doe Run. Other elected officials include an auditor, constable, and political party committee members. A Planning Commission is appointed by the supervisors and serve to advise the supervisors as to real estate subdivision, zoning, the township comprehensive plan, and similar matters.

== History ==
For many years the King Ranch was the largest landowner in West Marlborough Township and adjoining municipalities Newlin and East Fallowfield townships. The ranch property, operated as Buck and Doe Run Valley Farms, Inc., received Texas longhorn cattle shipped north by railroad for fattening on the lush grass of eastern Pennsylvania before being delivered to cattle markets for sale and slaughter. The heart of the King Ranch property was preserved by land conservation easements in the 1980s through the tireless efforts of a number of local public spirited citizens. Today, much of the rich pasture and scenic vistas remain preserved perpetually from encroachment by intensive land development. Over time, the King Ranch still remains true to its roots with many families still today living there their whole life.

Brooklawn, the Doe Run Village Historic District, Cyrus Hoopes House and Barn, House at Springdell, and Primitive Hall are listed on the National Register of Historic Places.

== Geography ==
According to the United States Census Bureau, the township has a total area of 17.1 square miles (44 km^{2}), all land. The township is largely rural, with several small villages, including London Grove, Doe Run, and Upland.

== Demographics ==
Historical population
Census	Pop.	Note	%±
1930	988		—
1940	882		−10.7%
1950	786		−10.9%
1960	901		14.6%
1970	917		1.8%
1980	941		2.6%
1990	874		−7.1%
2000	859		−1.7%
2010	814		−5.2%
2020	819		0.6%

At the 2010 census, the township was 88.8% non-Hispanic White, 0.7% Black or African American, 0.1% Native American, 0.6% Asian, and 1.0% were two or more races. 8.7% of the population were of Hispanic or Latino ancestry.

As of the census of 2000, there were 859 people, 349 households, and 224 families residing in the township. The population density was 50.1 inhabitants per square mile (19.3/km^{2}). There were 375 housing units at an average density of 21.9/sq mi (8.5/km^{2}). The racial makeup of the township was 93.95% White, 1.28% African American, 0.23% Native American, 0.58% Asian, 0.35% Pacific Islander, 3.49% from other races, and 0.12% from two or more races. Hispanic or Latino of any race were 8.61% of the population.

There were 349 households, out of which 30.4% had children under the age of 18 living with them, 54.4% were married couples living together, 6.3% had a female householder with no husband present, and 35.8% were non-families. 29.5% of all households were made up of individuals, and 6.0% had someone living alone who was 65 years of age or older. The average household size was 2.41 and the average family size was 3.03.

In the township the population was spread out, with 24.0% under the age of 18, 7.2% from 18 to 24, 31.0% from 25 to 44, 28.1% from 45 to 64, and 9.8% who were 65 years of age or older. The median age was 38 years. For every 100 females, there were 105.0 males. For every 100 females age 18 and over, there were 104.7 males.

The median income for a household in the township was $52,283, and the median income for a family was $56,875. Males had a median income of $36,750 versus $26,875 for females. The per capita income for the township was $33,245. About 4.2% of families and 4.8% of the population were below the poverty line, including 3.5% of those under age 18 and none of those age 65 or over.

== Transportation ==
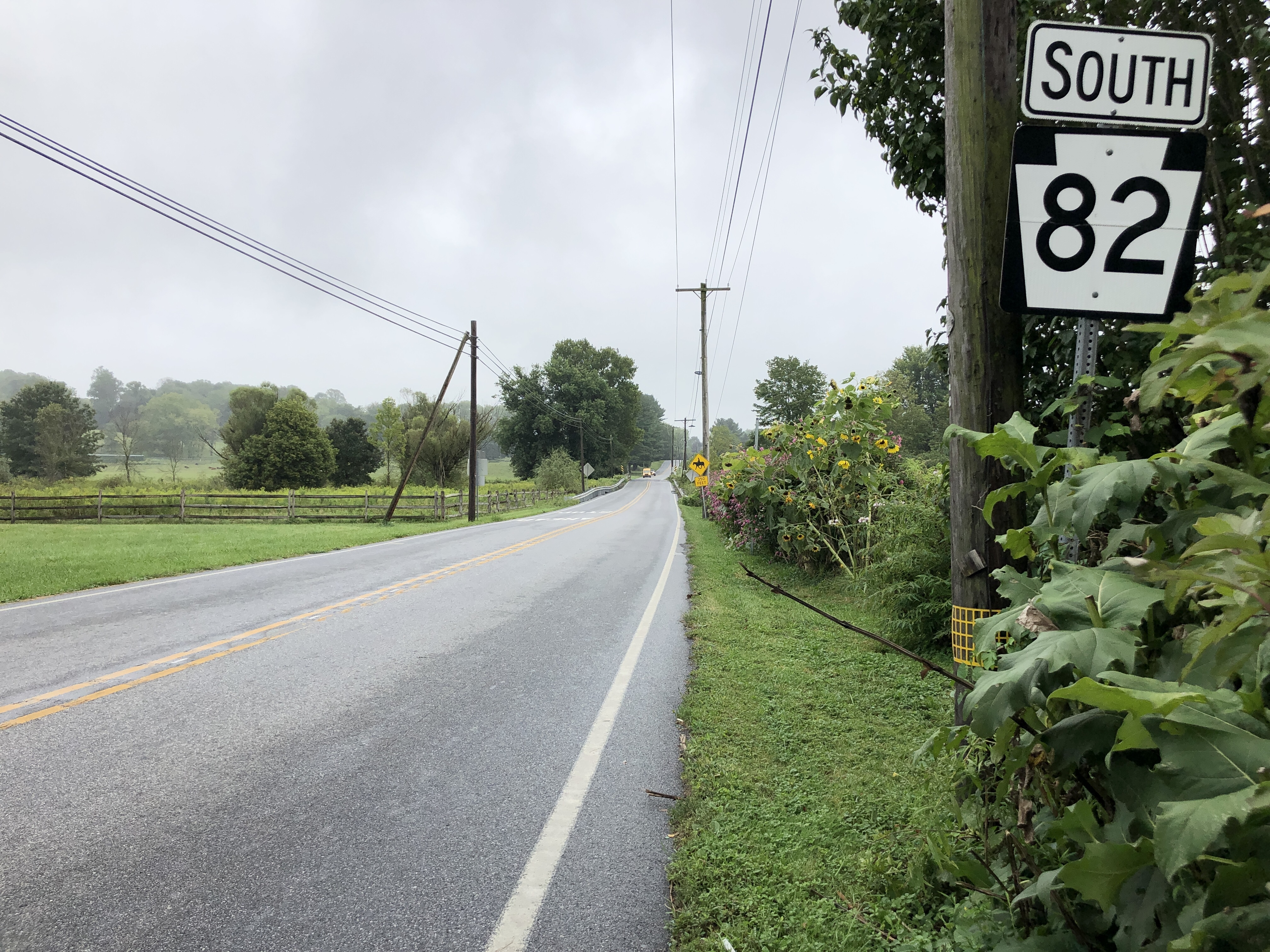
PA 82 southbound in West Marlborough Township

As of 2018, there were 44.41 miles (71.47 km) of public roads in West Marlborough Township, of which 20.72 miles (33.35 km) were maintained by the Pennsylvania Department of Transportation (PennDOT) and 23.69 miles (38.13 km) were maintained by the township.

Pennsylvania Route 82, Pennsylvania Route 841, Pennsylvania Route 842 and Pennsylvania Route 926 are the numbered roads serving West Marlborough Township. PA 82 follows Doe Run Road along a northwest–southeast alignment across the northern part of the township. PA 841 follows Chatham Road along a north–south alignment across the western part of the township. PA 842 follows Clonmell Upland Road eastward from PA 841 across the south-central part of the township. Finally, PA 926 follows Street Road along an east–west alignment across the southern portion of the township.

== Education ==
West Marlborough Township lies within the Unionville-Chadds Ford School District.

== Notable people ==
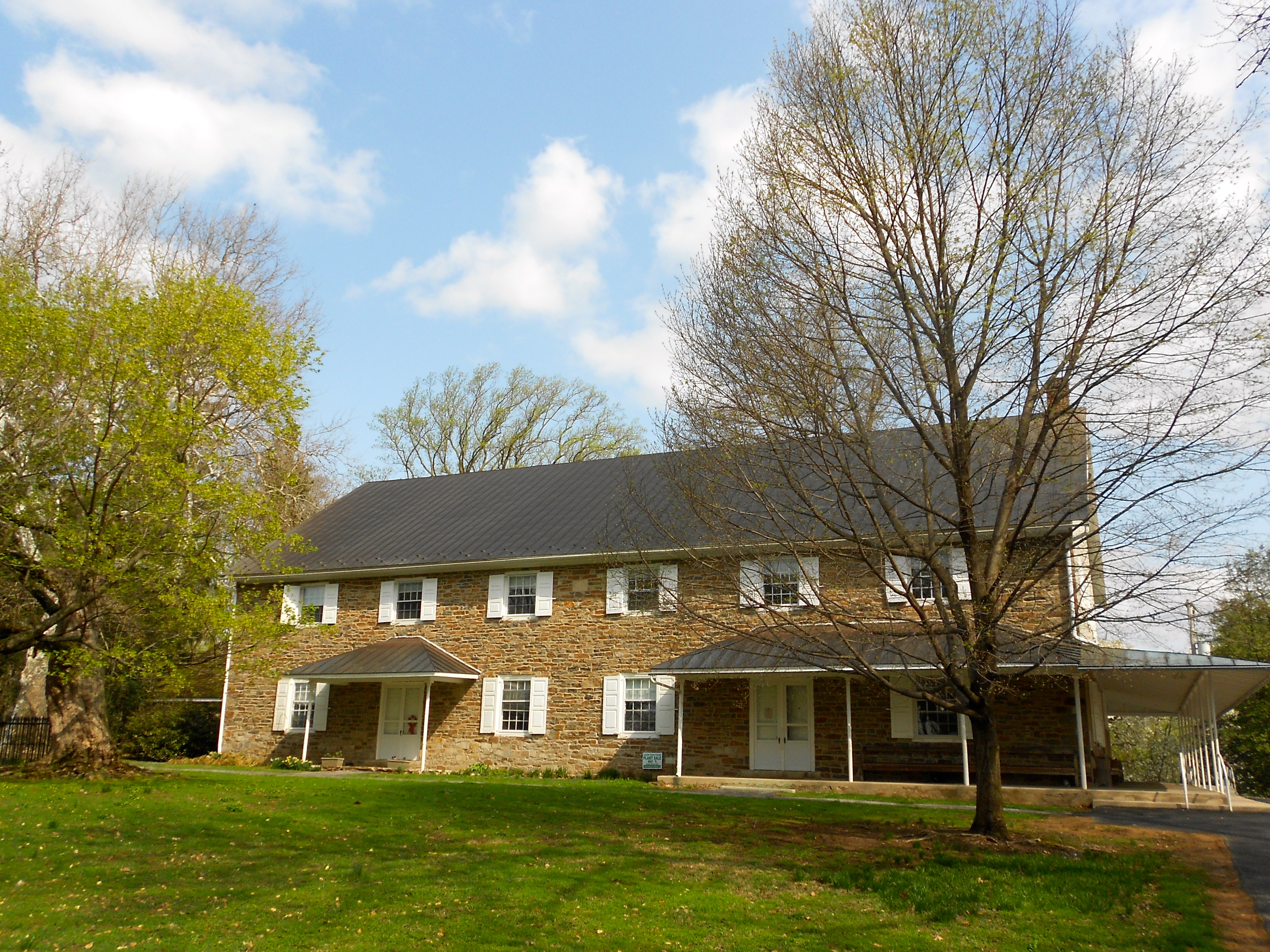
London Grove Friends Meeting House

- Esther D. du Pont, philanthropist
- James Fitzpatrick, Robin Hood type outlaw during the American Revolutionary War
- John Berne Hannum, federal judge
- Michael R. Matz, professional horse trainer
- Joseph McMinn, fifth Governor of Tennessee
