= Gradyville, Pennsylvania =

Unincorporated community in Pennsylvania, US

- Unincorporated community
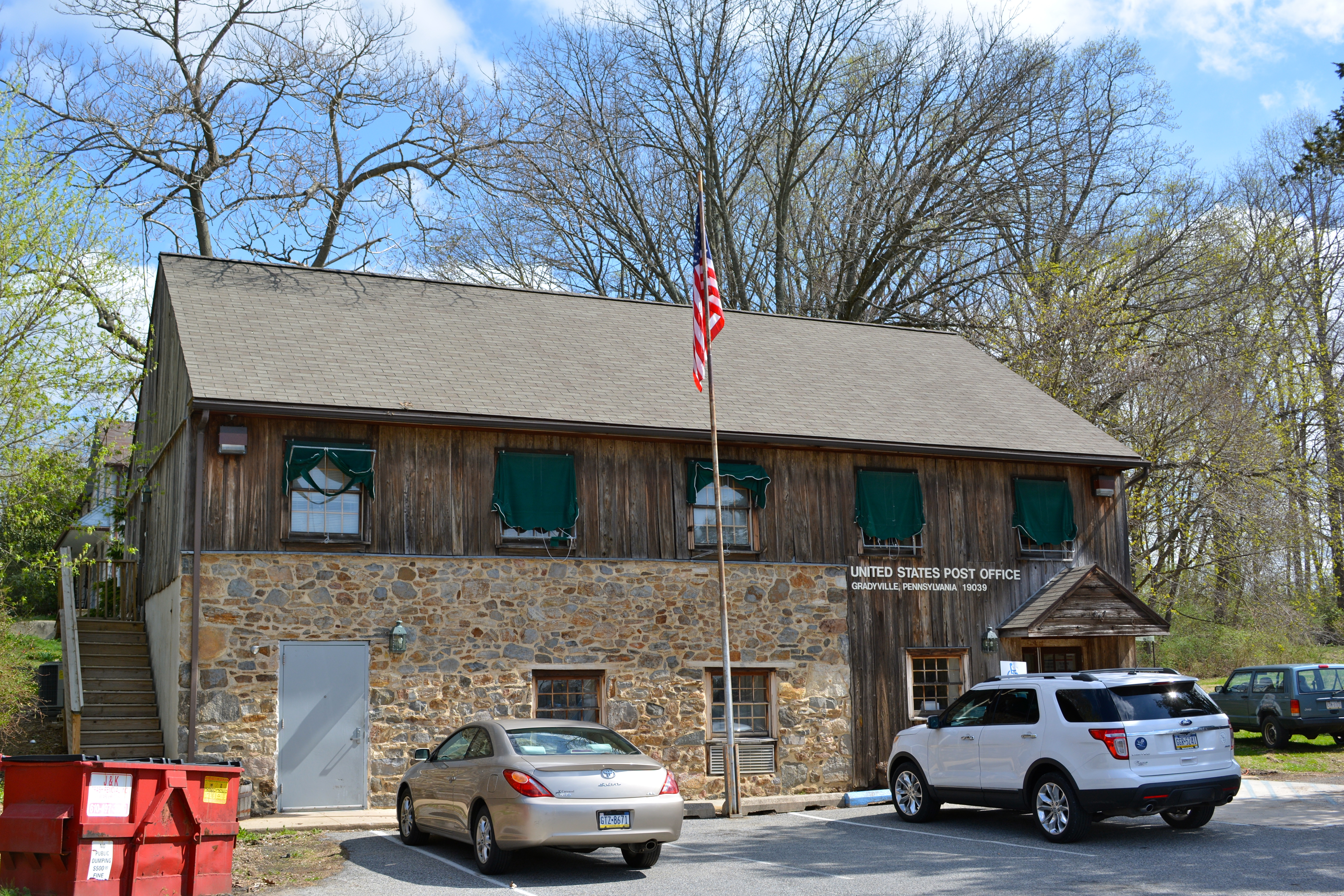
- Gradyville Post Office

- Location within Pennsylvania Location within the United States
- Coordinates: 39°56′35″N 75°28′10″W
- Country: United States
- State: Pennsylvania
- County: Delaware
- Township: Edgmont
- Elevation: 436 ft (133 m)
- Time zone: UTC−5 (Eastern (EST))
  - Summer (DST): UTC−4 (EDT)
- ZIP Code: 19039
- Area codes: 610 and 484
- GNIS feature ID: 1203706

Gradyville is an unincorporated community in Edgmont Township in Delaware County, Pennsylvania, United States. Gradyville is located at the intersection of Pennsylvania Route 352 and Gradyville Road.

The crossroads community is named for John Cadwalader Grady (October 8, 1847 – March 5, 1916), an American lawyer and politician from Pennsylvania who served as a Republican member of the Pennsylvania Senate for the 7th district from 1877 to 1903 including as President Pro Tempore from 1887 to 1890. Grady, a Philadelphia resident, owned a country estate in Edgmont Township, and the post office was Howellville when he moved there. When he bought the Howellville Hotel, he changed the name to the Gradyville Hotel, and then used his political influence to have the post office renamed "Gradyville" in 1890.
