= Parkside, Pennsylvania =

Borough in Pennsylvania, US

- Borough
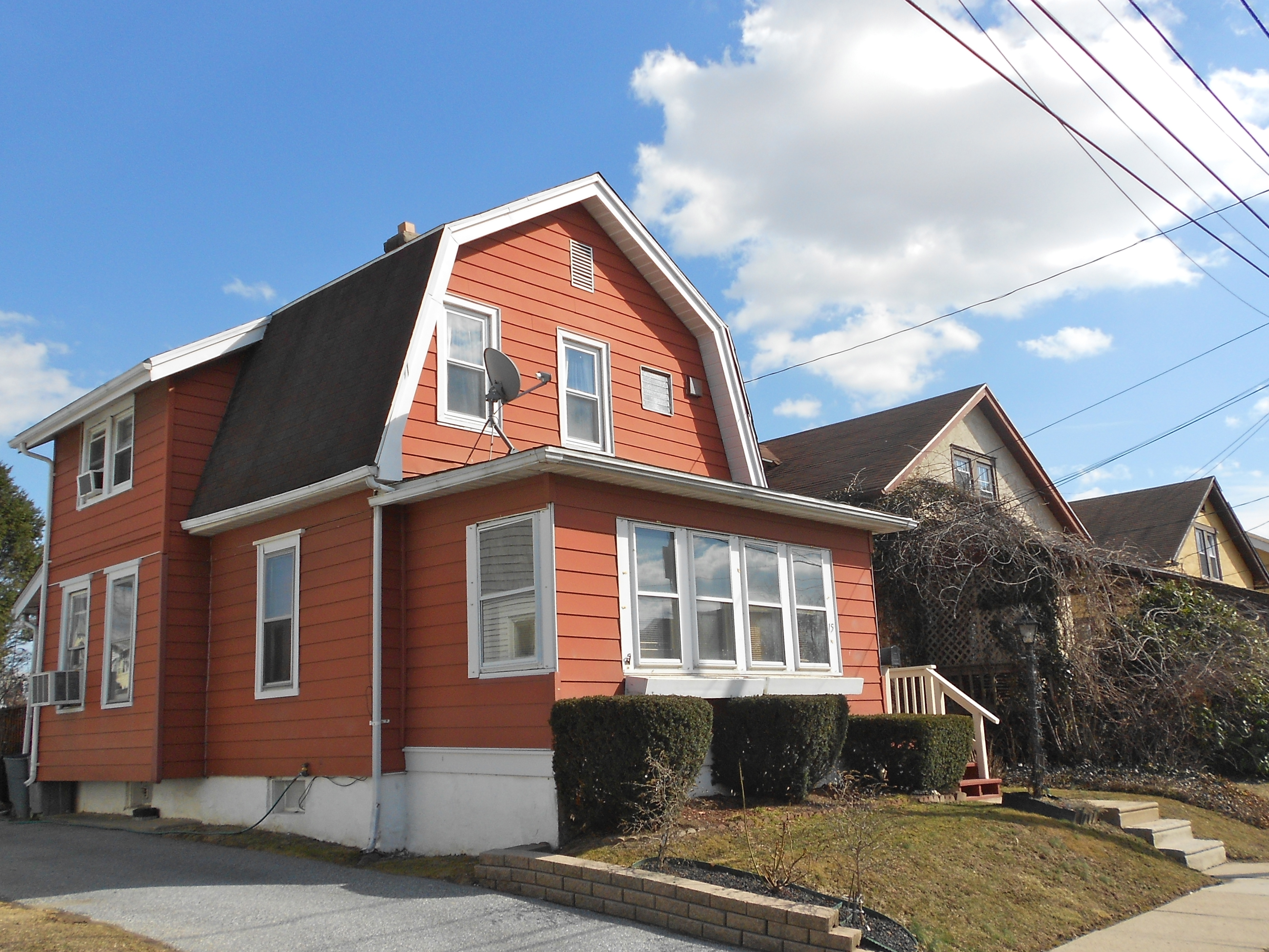
- Motto: "Small but Strong!"
- Location in Delaware County and the U.S. state of Pennsylvania.

- Location of Parkside in Pennsylvania Parkside (the United States)
- Coordinates: 39°52′0″N 75°22′42″W
- Country: United States
- State: Pennsylvania
- County: Delaware

Government
  - Type: Mayor/Council Mayor Kim Roman
  - Body: Borough Council

Area
  - Total: 0.20 sq mi (0.53 km^{2})
  - Land: 0.20 sq mi (0.53 km^{2})
  - Water: 0 sq mi (0.00 km^{2})
- Elevation: 105 ft (32 m)

Population (2020)
  - Total: 2,321
  - Density: 11,277.9/sq mi (4,354.43/km^{2})
- Time zone: UTC-5 (EST)
  - Summer (DST): UTC-4 (EDT)
- ZIP code: 19015
- Area code: 610
- FIPS code: 42-045-58176
- FIPS code: 42-58176
- GNIS feature ID: 1183333
- Website: www.parksideboro.com

Parkside is a borough in Delaware County, Pennsylvania, United States. As of the 2020 census, Parkside had a population of 2,321.

== Geography ==
Parkside is in southern Delaware County, bordered to the east by Chester, to the south by Upland, and to the west by Brookhaven.

According to the United States Census Bureau, the borough has a total area of 0.20 square miles (0.53 km^{2}), all land.

== Transportation ==
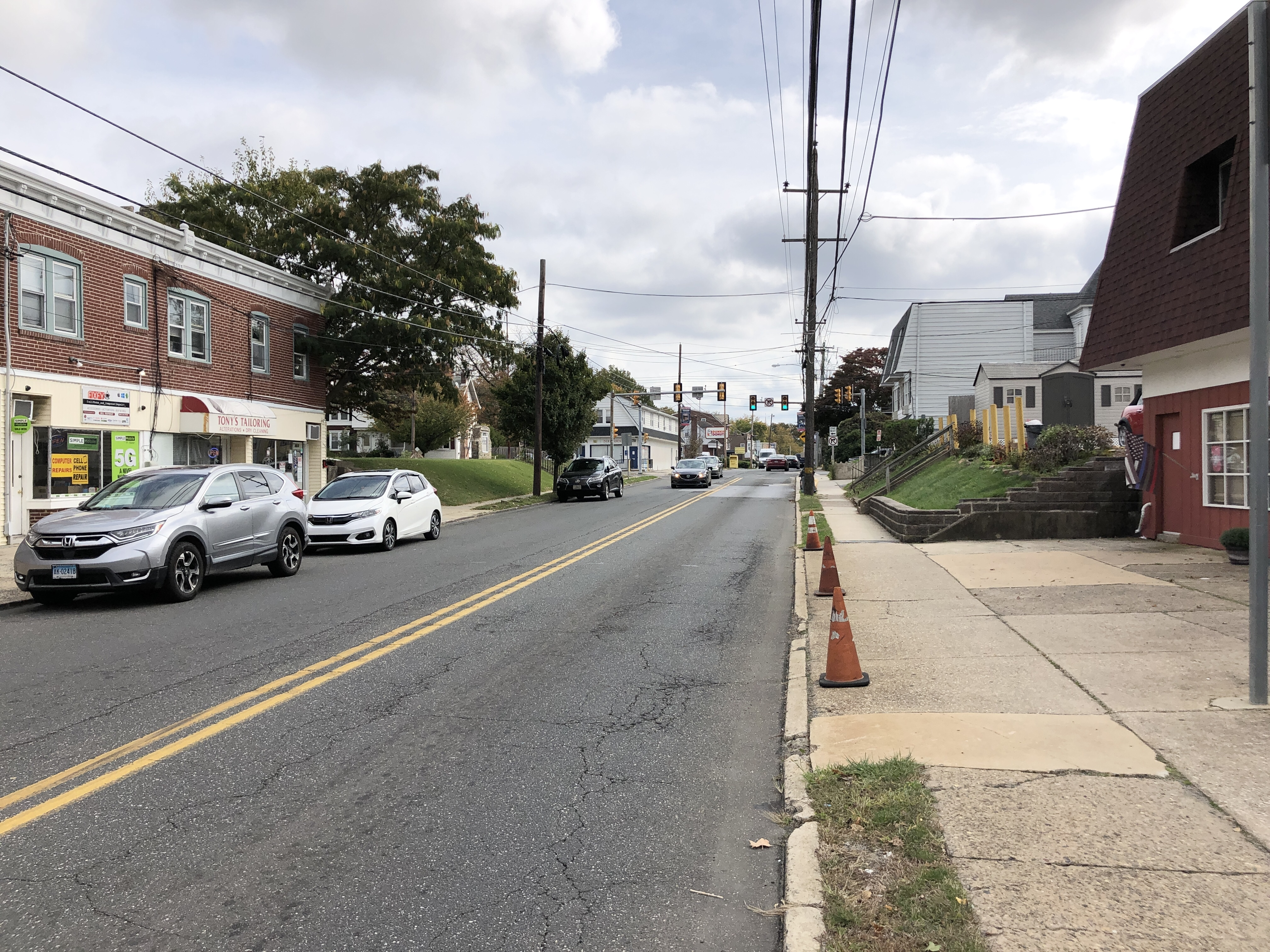
PA 352 southbound in Parkside

As of 2008, there were 4.56 miles (7.34 km) of public roads in Parkside, of which 0.50 miles (0.80 km) were maintained by the Pennsylvania Department of Transportation (PennDOT) and 4.06 miles (6.53 km) were maintained by the borough.

Pennsylvania Route 352 (Edgmont Avenue) is the main road through the borough, leading southeast 2 miles (3 km) to Interstate 95 and the center of Chester and northwest 4 miles (6 km) to U.S. Route 1 near Media.

== Demographics ==
Historical population
Census	Pop.	Note	%±
1920	374		—
1930	1,497		300.3%
1940	1,579		5.5%
1950	1,637		3.7%
1960	2,426		48.2%
1970	2,343		−3.4%
1980	2,464		5.2%
1990	2,369		−3.9%
2000	2,267		−4.3%
2010	2,328		2.7%
2020	2,321		−0.3%

As of Census 2010, the racial makeup of the borough was 80.5% White, 12.9% African American, 0.8% Native American, 2.4% Asian, 0.9% from other races, and 2.4% from two or more races. Hispanic or Latino of any race were 3.5% of the population .

As of the census of 2000, there were 2,267 people, 869 households, and 604 families residing in the borough. The population density was 10,897.8 inhabitants per square mile (4,207.7/km^{2}). There were 918 housing units at an average density of 4,413.0 per square mile (1,703.9/km^{2}). The racial makeup of the borough was 95.63% White, 2.43% African American, 0.18% Native American, 0.57% Asian, 0.04% Pacific Islander, 0.35% from other races, and 0.79% from two or more races. Hispanic or Latino of any race were 1.76% of the population.

There were 869 households, out of which 35.7% had children under the age of 18 living with them, 50.3% were married couples living together, 13.7% had a female householder with no husband present, and 30.4% were non-families. 26.2% of all households were made up of individuals, and 10.8% had someone living alone who was 65 years of age or older. The average household size was 2.61 and the average family size was 3.16.

In the borough the population was spread out, with 27.0% under the age of 18, 7.3% from 18 to 24, 33.8% from 25 to 44, 18.6% from 45 to 64, and 13.3% who were 65 years of age or older. The median age was 35 years. For every 100 females there were 95.3 males. For every 100 females age 18 and over, there were 92.3 males.

The median income for a household in the borough was $43,533, and the median income for a family was $48,958. Males had a median income of $40,668 versus $28,563 for females. The per capita income for the borough was $19,448. About 5.0% of families and 5.6% of the population were below the poverty line, including 4.9% of those under age 18 and 14.5% of those age 65 or over.

== Education ==
Parkside is a part of the Penn-Delco School District.

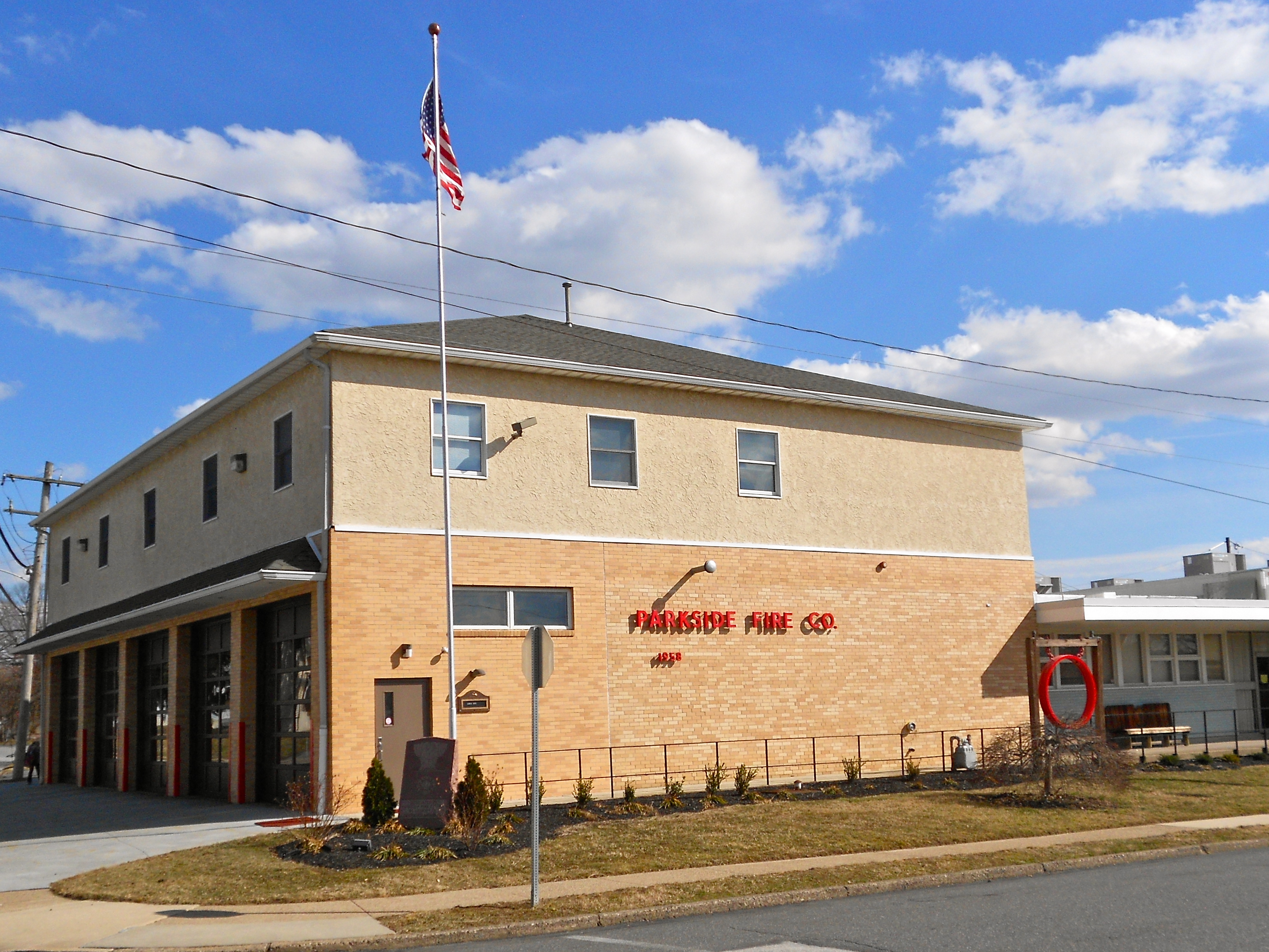
Fire company

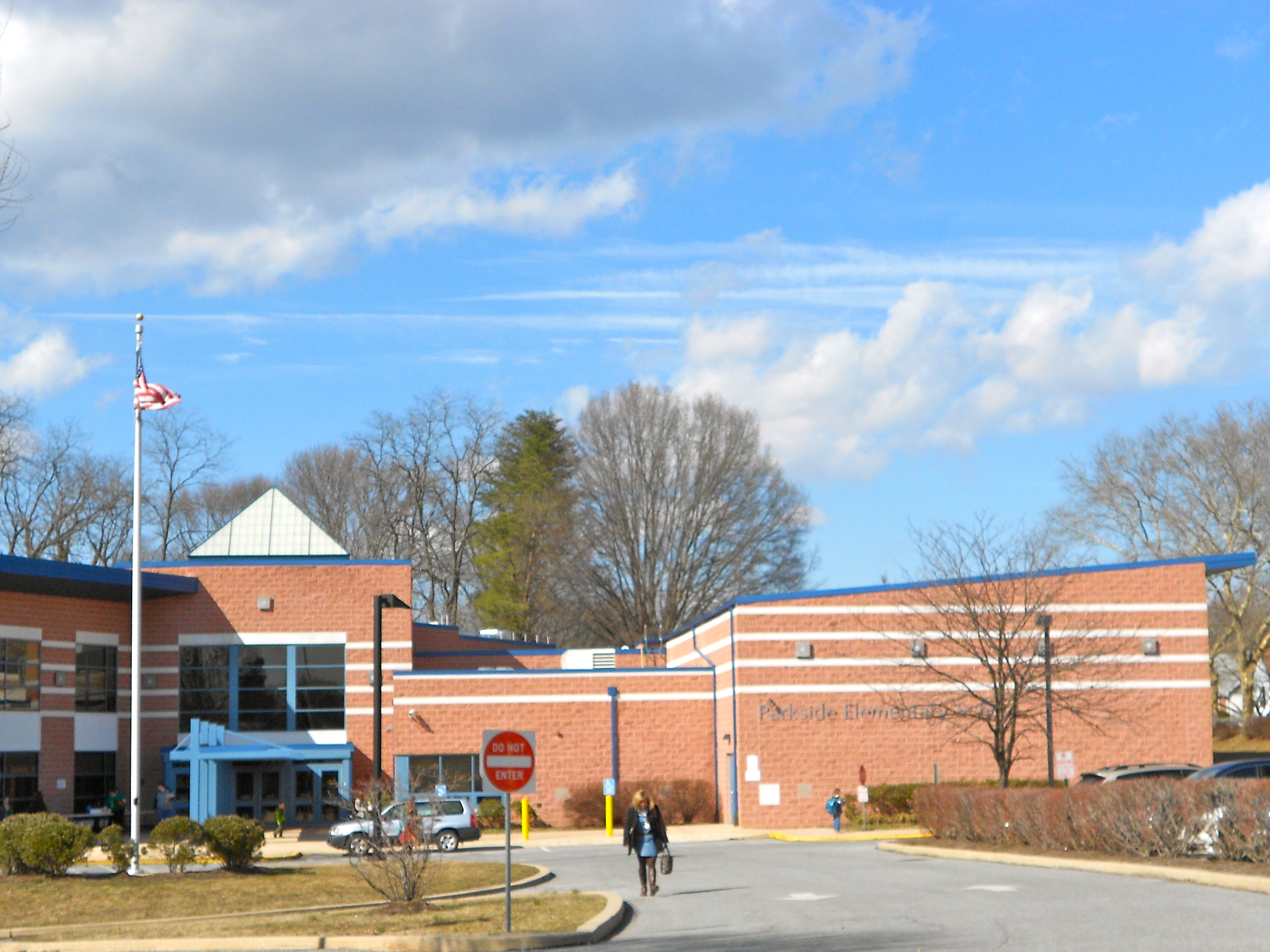
Parkside Elementary School

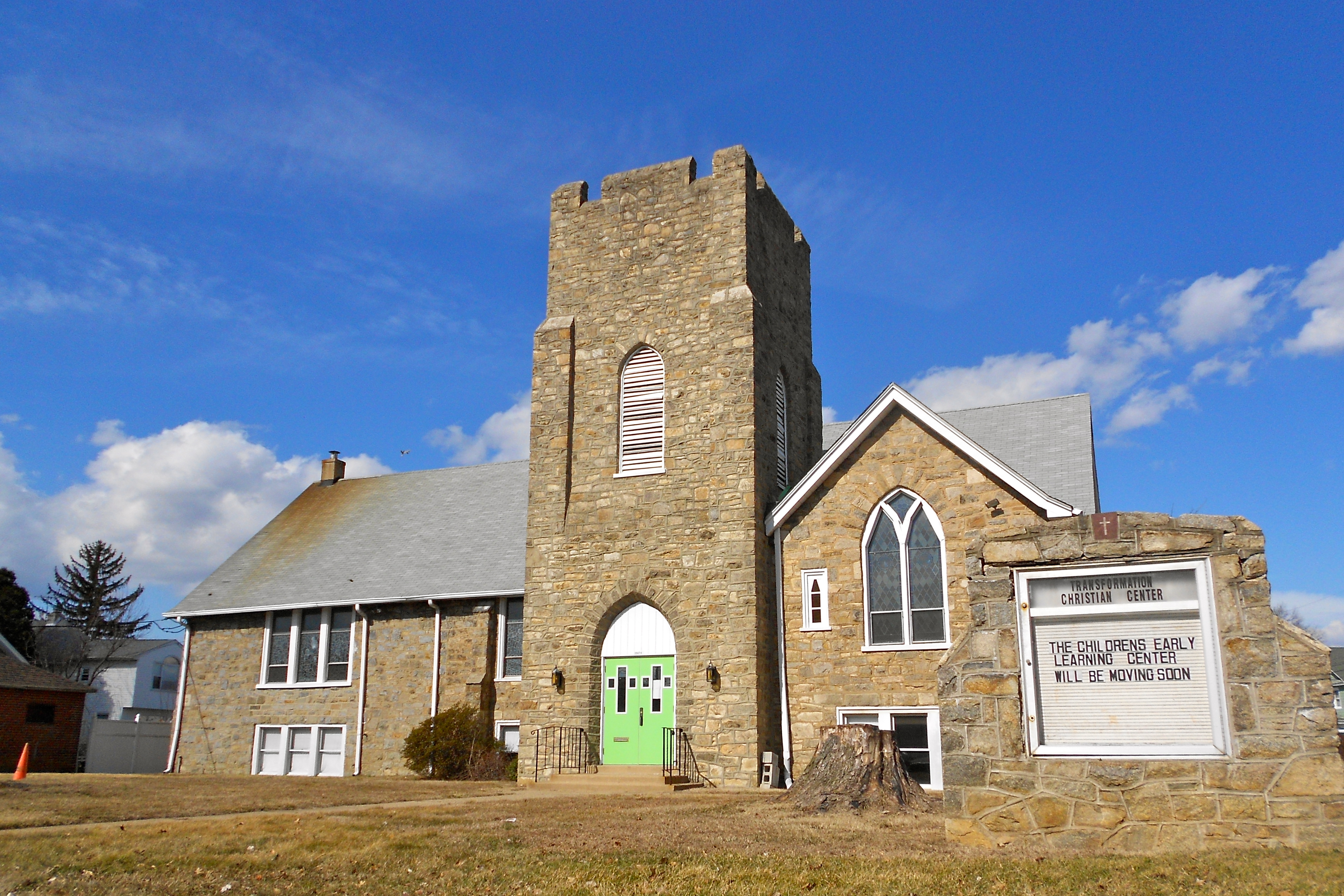
Empty church

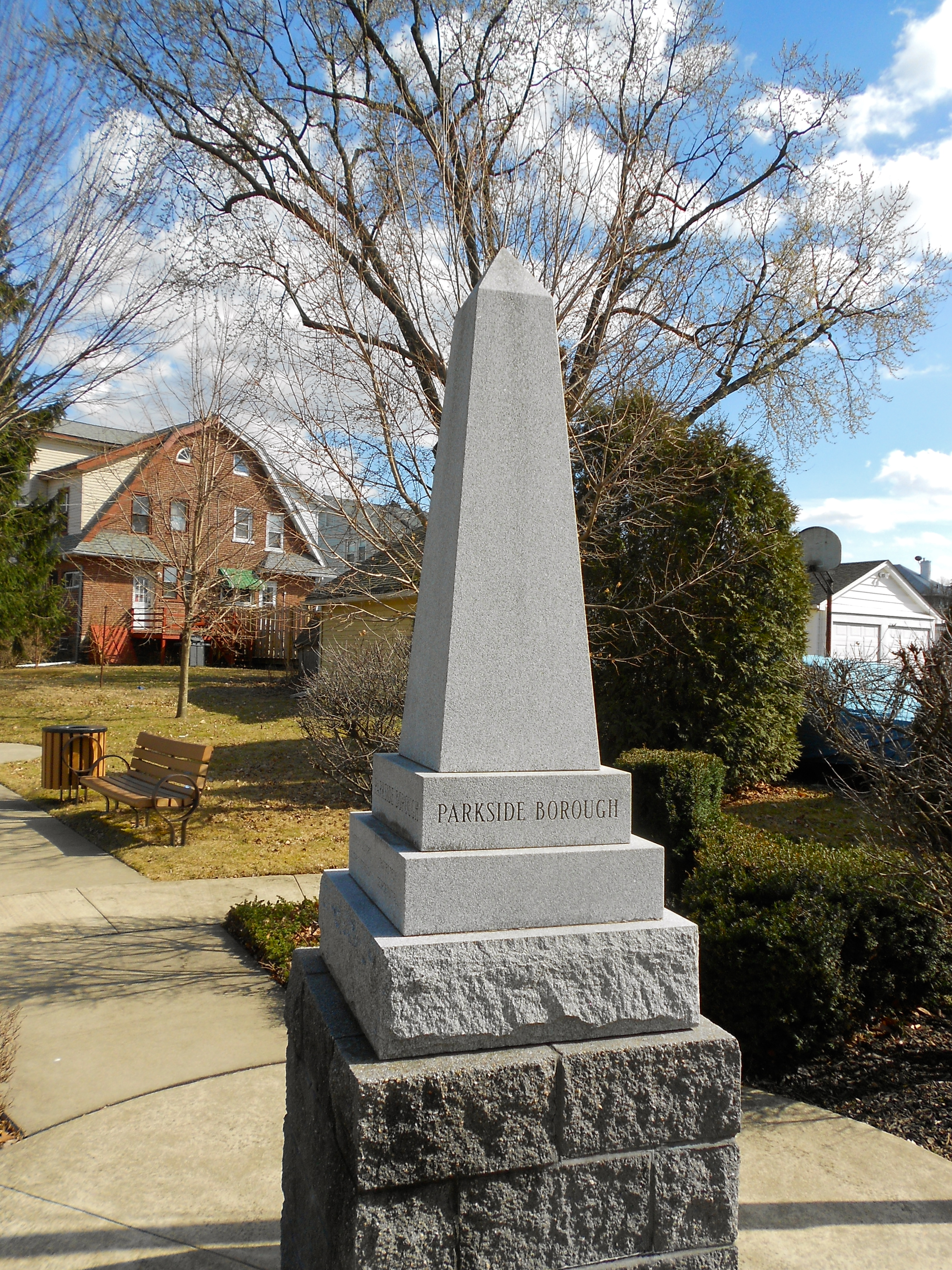
Veterans' memorial
