= Doe Run Village Historic District =

Historic district in Pennsylvania, United States

- U.S. National Register of Historic Places
- U.S. Historic district
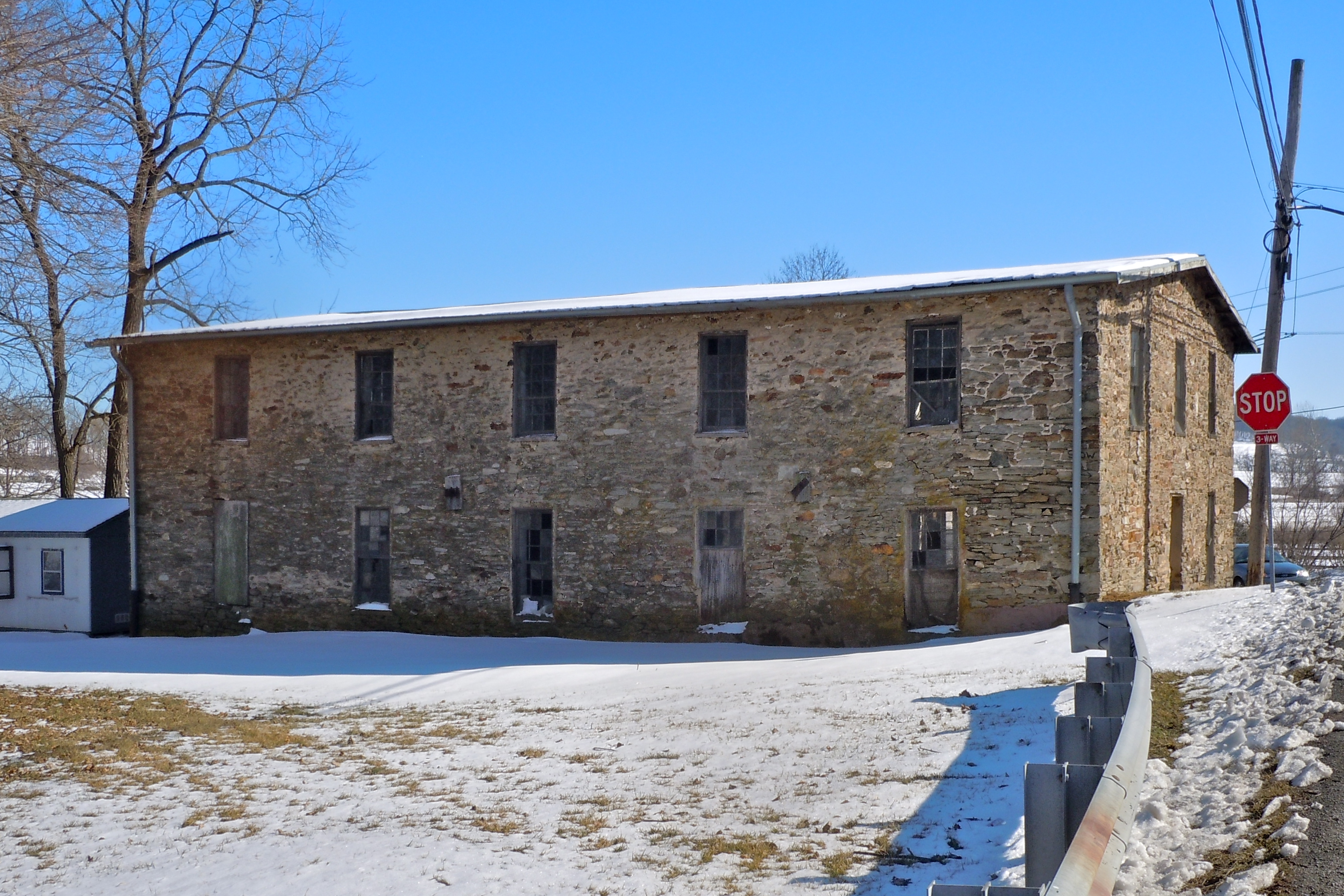
- Doe Run Mill, Doe Run Village Historic District, February 2011

- Location within Pennsylvania Location within the United States
- Location: Highland Dairy, DuPont & Chapel Rds. & Rts. 82 & 841, West Marlborough Township and East Fallowfield Township, Pennsylvania
- Coordinates: 39°55′08″N 75°49′04″W
- Area: 850 acres (340 ha)
- MPS: West Branch Brandywine Creek MRA
- NRHP reference No.: 85002349
- Added to NRHP: September 16, 1985

Doe Run Village Historic District is a national historic district located in West Marlborough Township and East Fallowfield Township, Chester County, Pennsylvania. It encompasses twenty-six contributing buildings and one contributing site in the rural community of Doe Run Village. Buildings cluster in three primary locations. The first cluster includes the Doe Run Garage, old general store, and some residences. The second cluster is associated with a cotton mill that was subsequently replaced with the town hall in 1898. The town hall subsequently contained a dairy. Located nearby are the ruins of a paper mill. The third cluster is associated with a gristmill (1744). Also in the district is the Doe Run School and former Presbyterian Church.

James Fitzpatrick, notorious highwayman and loyalist during the American Revolutionary War, was born in Springdell in 1748.

Doe Run was added to the National Register of Historic Places in 1985.
