= Cyrus Hoopes House and Barn =

Historic house in Pennsylvania, United States

- U.S. National Register of Historic Places
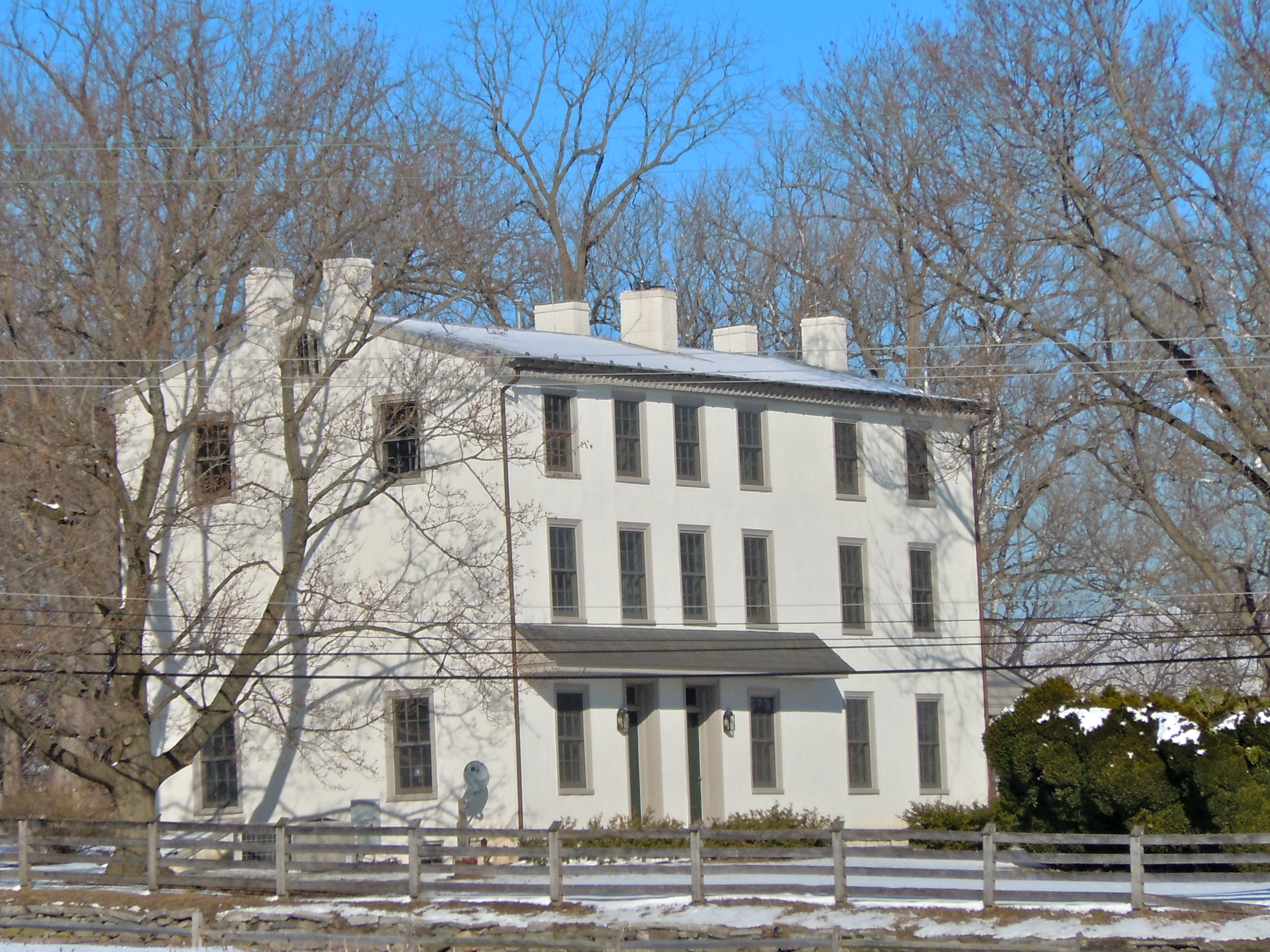
- Cyrus Hoopes House, February 2011

- Location within Pennsylvania Location within the United States
- Location: Springdell Rd., West Marlborough Township, Pennsylvania
- Coordinates: 39°54′33″N 75°49′59″W
- Area: 11 acres (4.5 ha)
- Built: c. 1825, c. 1860, c. 1887
- Architectural style: Greek Revival, Other, Greek revival vernacular
- MPS: West Branch Brandywine Creek MRA
- NRHP reference No.: 85003050
- Added to NRHP: November 26, 1985

Cyrus Hoopes House and Barn is a historic home and barn located in West Marlborough Township, Chester County, Pennsylvania. The house was built about 1825, with a major wing added about 1860. The original section is three stories and four bays wide. The wing added two additional bays. The house had four bay wide porches and is constructed of stuccoed stone. It displays Greek Revival style design influences. The frame bank barn was built about 1887. It replaced an earlier barn that burned in a fire in 1884. Also on the property are the remains of a limestone quarry and lime kiln.

It was added to the National Register of Historic Places in 1985.
