= Goshenville, Pennsylvania =

Unincorporated community in Pennsylvania, US

- Unincorporated community
- Location within Pennsylvania
- Coordinates: 39°59′42″N 75°32′40″W
- Country: United States
- State: Pennsylvania
- County: Chester
- Township: East Goshen
- Elevation: 423 ft (129 m)
- Time zone: UTC-5 (Eastern (EST))
  - Summer (DST): UTC-4 (EDT)
- Area codes: 610 and 484
- GNIS feature ID: 1203702

Goshenville is an unincorporated community in East Goshen Township in Chester County, Pennsylvania, United States. Goshenville is located at the intersection of Pennsylvania Route 352 and Paoli Pike.

== See also ==
- Goshenville Historic District
