= Pennsylvania Route 352 =

State highway in Pennsylvania, US

Pennsylvania Route 352
- PA 352 in red and PA 352 Alt. Truck in blue

Route information
- Maintained by PennDOT
- Length: 18.583 mi (29.906 km)
- Existed: 1928–present

Major junctions
- South end: US 13 Bus. in Chester
- I-95 in Chester; US 1 in Middletown Township; PA 452 in Middletown Township; PA 926 in Thornbury Township; PA 3 in Westtown Township
- North end: US 30 in Frazer

Location
- Country: United States
- State: Pennsylvania
- Counties: Delaware, Chester

Highway system
- Pennsylvania State Route System; Interstate; US; State; Scenic; Legislative
← PA 351	→ PA 353

Pennsylvania Route 352 (PA 352) is a 19-mile (31 km) north–south route that runs from U.S. Route 13 Business (US 13 Bus.) in Chester, Delaware County, north to US 30 in Frazer, Chester County. The route passes through suburban areas of Delaware and Chester counties west of Philadelphia, serving Parkside, Brookhaven, Elwyn, Lima, Gradyville, and Goshenville. PA 352 is a four- to five-lane road between Brookhaven and US 1, otherwise it is generally a two-lane road. The route intersects Interstate 95 (I-95) in Chester and US 1 near Lima at interchanges. PA 352 was first designated by 1928 to run between its current termini. A portion of the route between Brookhaven and US 1 was realigned to a straighter alignment in the 1950s. By 1980, PA 352 was realigned to a short concurrency with PA 3 to avoid intersecting it at a sharp angle.

== Route description ==
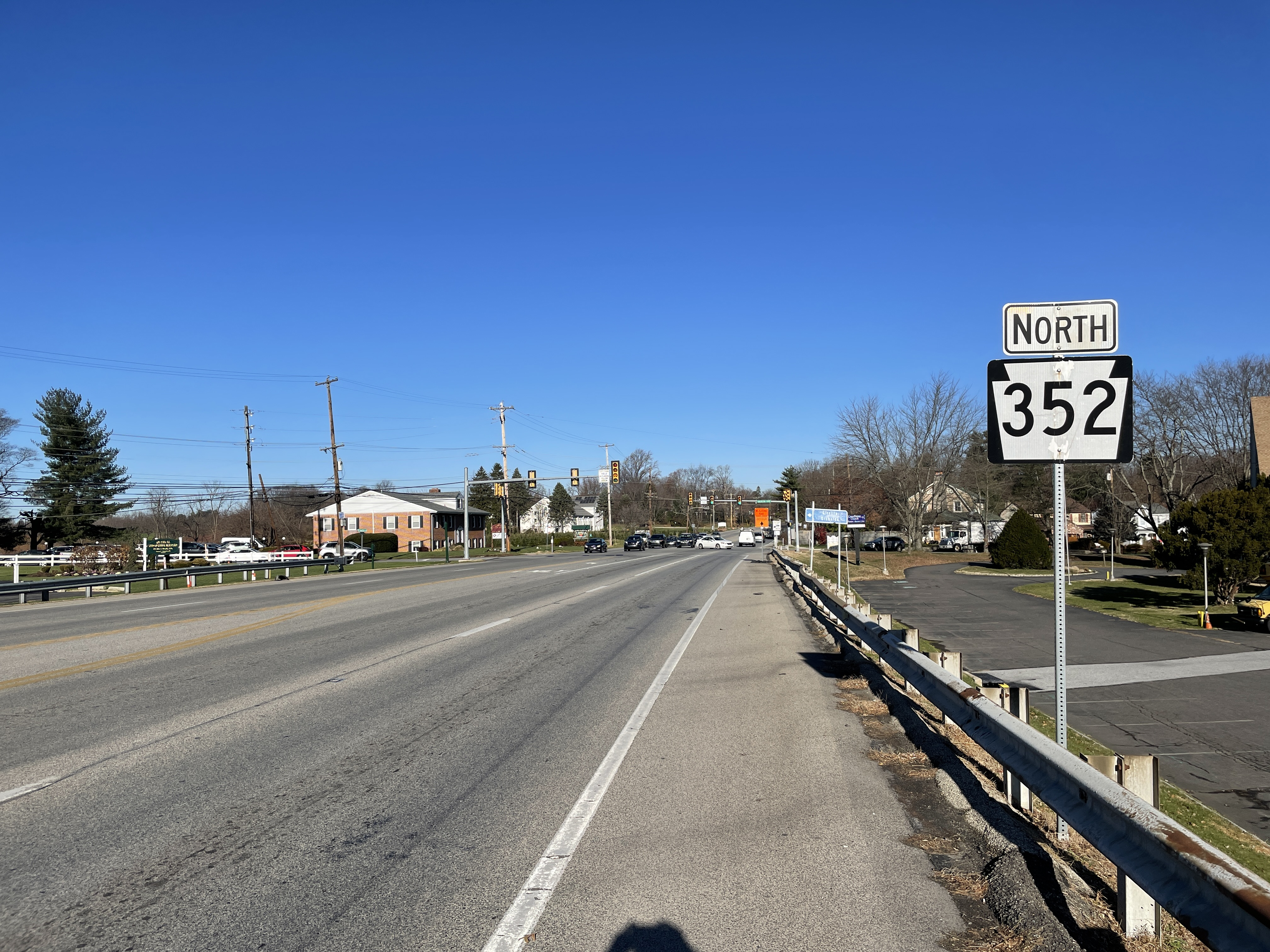
PA 352 northbound in Middletown Township

PA 352 begins at an intersection with US 13 Bus. in the city of Chester in Delaware County, heading north on four-lane undivided Edgmont Avenue. South of US 13 Bus., the road continues as unnumbered Avenue of the States through downtown Chester to an intersection with US 13/PA 291 near the Delaware River. From US 13 Bus., the route runs through urban areas of homes and businesses, passing to the east of Deshong Park. PA 352 comes to an interchange with I-95 a block west of PA 320. This interchange has access to southbound I-95 and from northbound I-95 from both PA 320 and PA 352. Access to northbound I-95 and from southbound I-95 is provided by ramps connecting to Chestnut Street, with Chestnut Street and 12th Street providing access to PA 320 and PA 352. The route passes over CSX's Philadelphia Subdivision railroad line immediately after crossing over I-95. Past here, the route heads north-northwest as a two-lane undivided road, passing more homes and commercial establishments. The road curves northwest near the Chester Rural Cemetery to the southwest and St. Michael Cemetery to the northeast, running through more residential neighborhoods. PA 352 crosses into the borough of Parkside, where it passes more homes along with a few businesses. The route enters the borough of Brookhaven and gains a center left-turn lane as it heads through commercial areas. The road widens to five lanes as it passes more shopping centers along with some woods to the southwest.

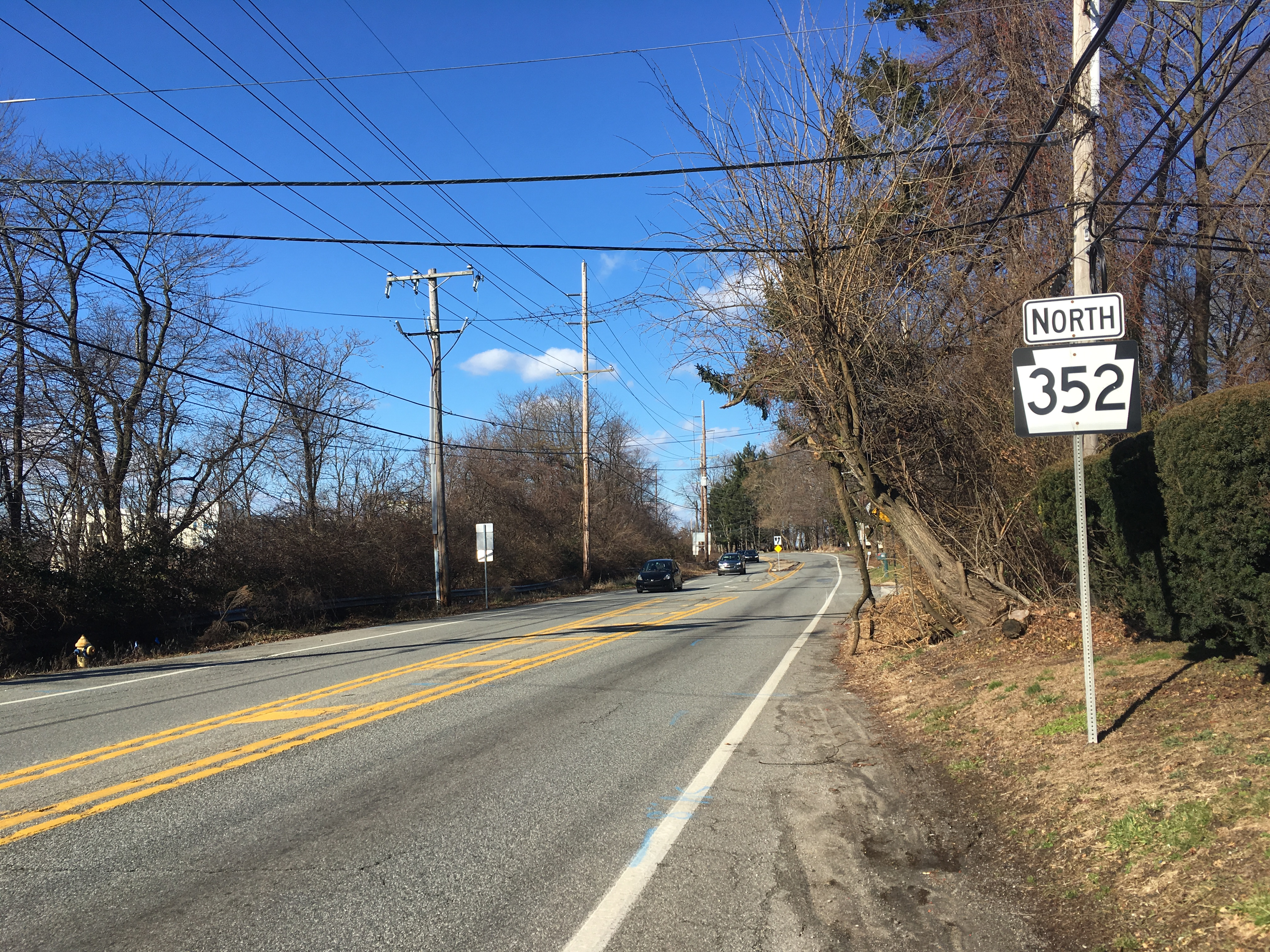
PA 352 northbound past US 1 in Middletown Township

A short distance past the Dutton Mill Road intersection, PA 352 leaves Brookhaven for Middletown Township and becomes New Middletown Road. The road heads through wooded suburban residential neighborhoods along with some fields, curving to the north. The route curves northwest again and passes through more wooded areas of homes. PA 352 reaches the community of Elwyn, where it comes to a bridge over SEPTA's Media/Wawa Line a short distance west of Elwyn station. Past this, the road heads northwest between the Williamson Free School of Mechanical Trades to the west and the Elwyn Institute to the east. The route narrows to a four-lane undivided road, passing homes and coming to an interchange with US 1 (Baltimore Pike). After this interchange, PA 352 becomes a two-lane divided highway called Middletown Road as it curves to the west, passing between fields and woods with some homes to the northeast and the Promenade at Granite Run residential and retail center to the southwest. The route becomes a two-lane undivided road and runs through wooded areas of homes and some commercial establishments, coming to an intersection with the northern terminus of PA 452 in the community of Lima.

Past this intersection, the road curves north through commercial areas, heading to the east of the Pennsylvania State Police Crime Lab and the Delaware County Juvenile Detention Center. PA 352 continues north and passes between the Penn State Brandywine university campus to the west and wooded residential areas to the east. The route curves northwest and crosses into Edgmont Township, where it runs between woods and some homes to the southwest and forests and fields in Ridley Creek State Park to the northeast. The road passes more residences before it crosses Gradyville Road in the community of Gradyville. PA 352 heads more to the west and runs past residential neighborhoods with some woods and fields. The route curves northwest into Thornbury Township, where it comes to an intersection with PA 926.

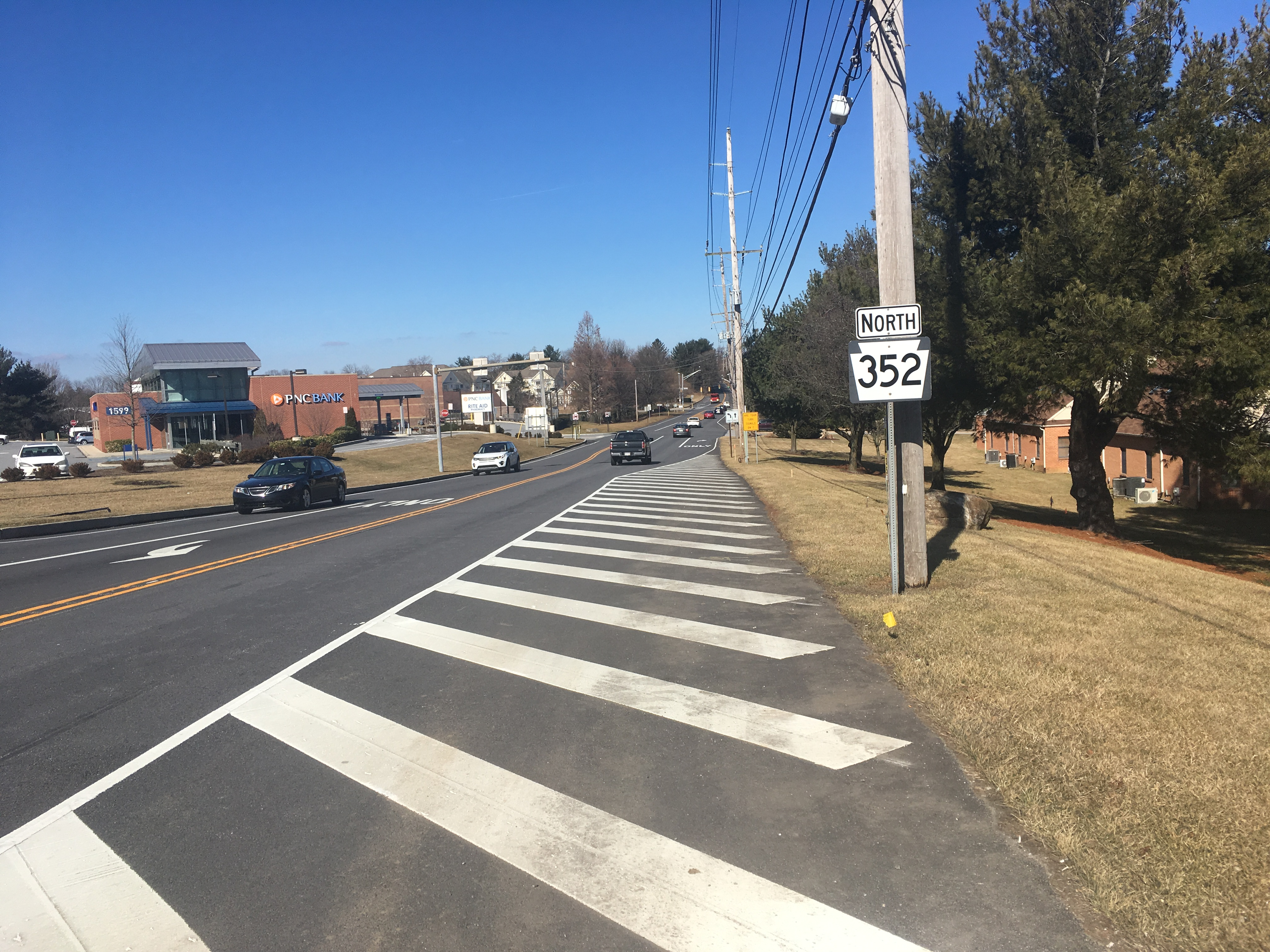
PA 352 northbound past PA 3 in Westtown Township

Upon crossing PA 926, PA 352 heads into Westtown Township in Chester County, where the name changes to Chester Road. The road continues past wooded residential neighborhoods to the west and fields to the east before continuing past homes. The route gains a second northbound lane and curves north as it comes to an intersection with PA 3. At this point, PA 352 turns west to form a short concurrency with PA 3 on six-lane divided West Chester Pike, passing homes to the north and businesses to the south. After a block, PA 352 splits from PA 3 by turning northwest onto two-lane undivided Chester Road, crossing into East Goshen Township and heading through wooded residential areas. The road curves north and intersects Paoli Pike in the community of Goshenville. The route continues north past more homes, passing to the east of the community and golf course of Hershey's Mill. PA 352 runs through more wooded residential areas and curves northwest, intersecting King Road. Past this intersection, the route enters East Whiteland Township and the name becomes Sproul Road. The road passes between Immaculata University to the west and homes to the east. The route passes under Amtrak's Keystone Corridor railroad line and heads into commercial areas, coming to a bridge over Norfolk Southern's Dale Secondary. PA 352 comes to its northern terminus at an intersection with US 30 (Lancaster Avenue) in the community of Frazer.

== History ==
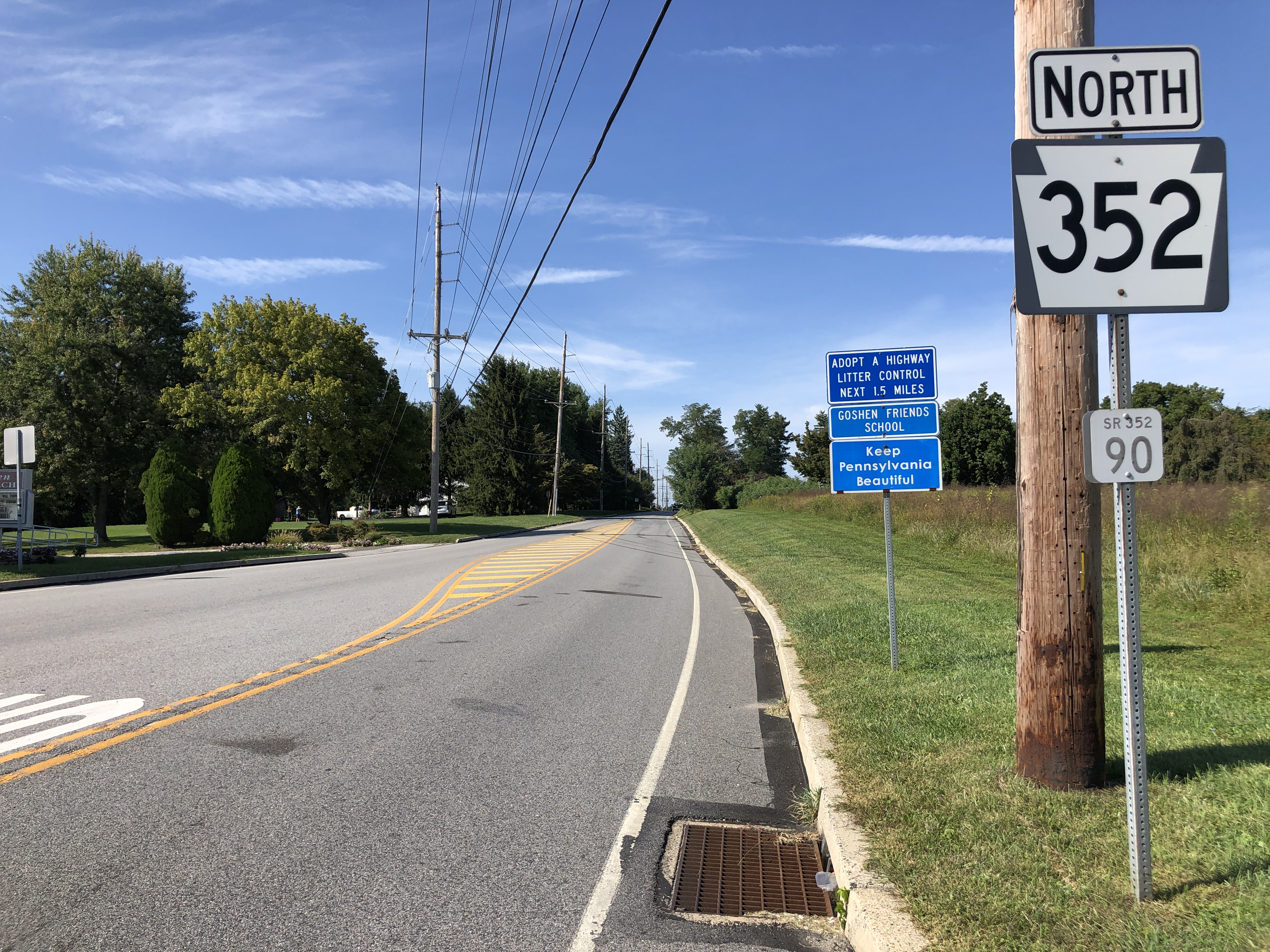
PA 352 northbound in East Goshen Township

In 1911, when the Sproul Road Bill was passed, Legislative Route 132 was designated on current PA 352 between Chester and Baltimore Pike west of Media, while Legislative Route 179 was designated on the part between Media and Paoli Pike in East Goshen Township. PA 352 was first designated by 1928 to run from US 13 (now US 13 Bus.) in Chester north to US 30 in Frazer. By 1950, a portion of PA 352 north of Parkside was widened into a multilane highway and a straighter alignment for PA 352 was proposed from north of Parkside to south of US 1. The realigned PA 352 was completed during the 1950s, with the former alignment now Old Middletown Road. By 1980, PA 352 was realigned to form a short concurrency with PA 3 instead of intersecting it at a sharp angle.

== Major intersections ==
County	Location	mi	km	Destinations	Notes
Delaware	Chester	0.000	0.000	US 13 Bus. (9th Street)	Southern terminus
Delaware	Chester	0.281	0.452	I-95	Exit 6 on I-95
Delaware	Middletown Township	5.744	9.244	US 1 – Lima, Chester Heights, Springfield, Media	Interchange
Delaware	Middletown Township	6.701	10.784	PA 452 south (Pennell Road) – Marcus Hook	Northern terminus of PA 452
Delaware–Chester county line	Thornbury–Westtown township line	11.589	18.651	PA 926 (Street Road) – Cheyney, Edgmont	
Chester	Westtown Township	12.838	20.661	PA 3 east – Newtown Square	South end of PA 3 concurrency
Chester	Westtown Township	12.967	20.868	PA 3 west (West Chester Pike) – West Chester	North end of PA 3 concurrency
Chester	East Whiteland Township	18.583	29.906	US 30 (Lancaster Avenue) – Exton, Paoli	Northern terminus of PA 352
1.000 mi = 1.609 km; 1.000 km = 0.621 mi: Concurrency terminus

== PA 352 Alternate Truck ==
PA Route 352 Alternate Truck
- Location: East Goshen Township–East Whiteland Township
- Existed: 2023–present

Pennsylvania Route 352 Alternate Truck (PA 352 Alt. Truck) is a truck route that bypasses a low clearance underpass under SEPTA's Paoli/Thorndale Line in Frazer, where trucks with a clearance of 10'0" or higher are prohibited. The route follows Greenhill Road, Boot Road, US 202, and US 30. It was signed in 2023.

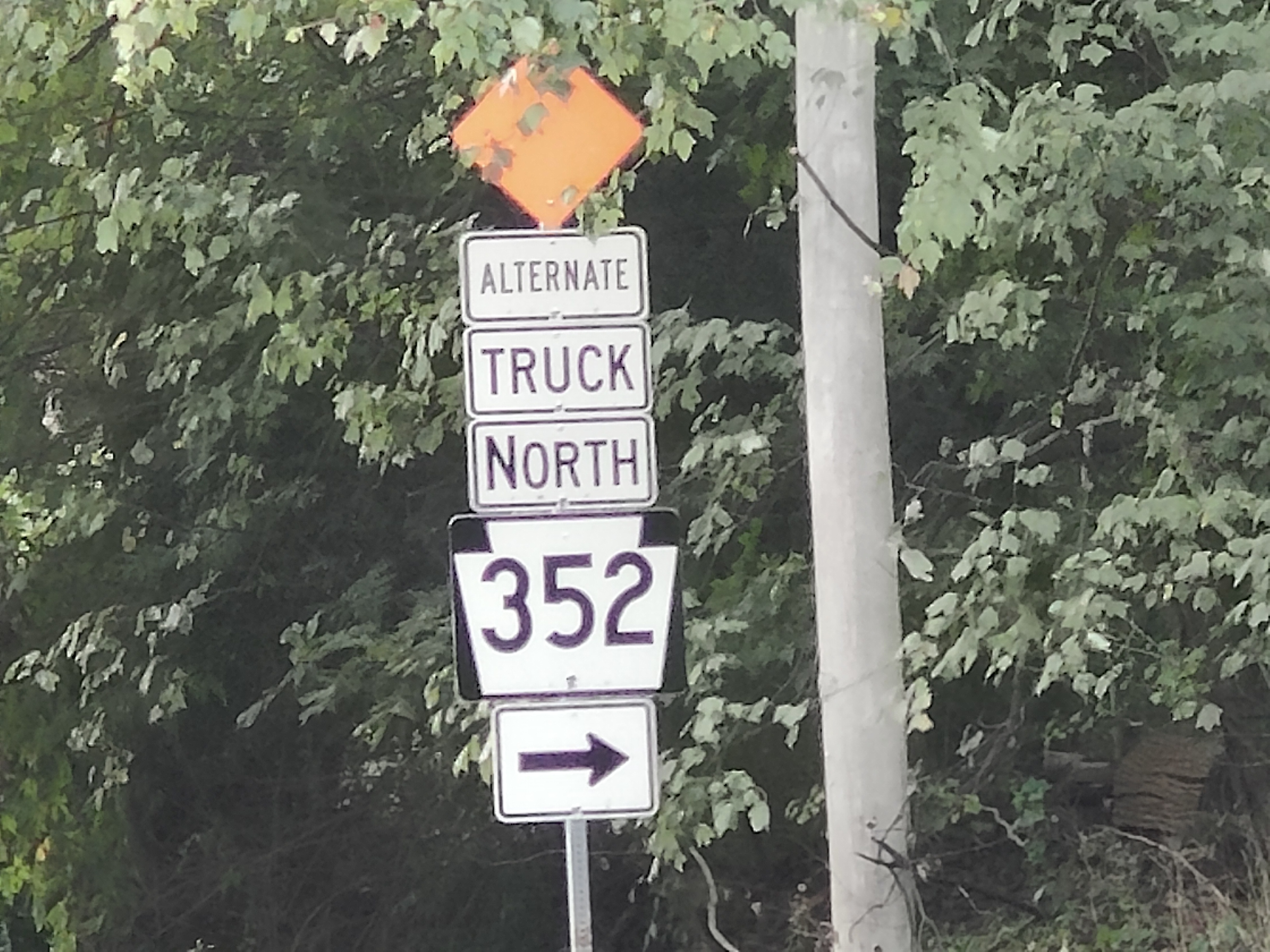
PA 352 Alternate Truck at its southern terminus.
