= Goshenville Historic District =

Historic district in Pennsylvania, United States

- U.S. National Register of Historic Places
- U.S. Historic district
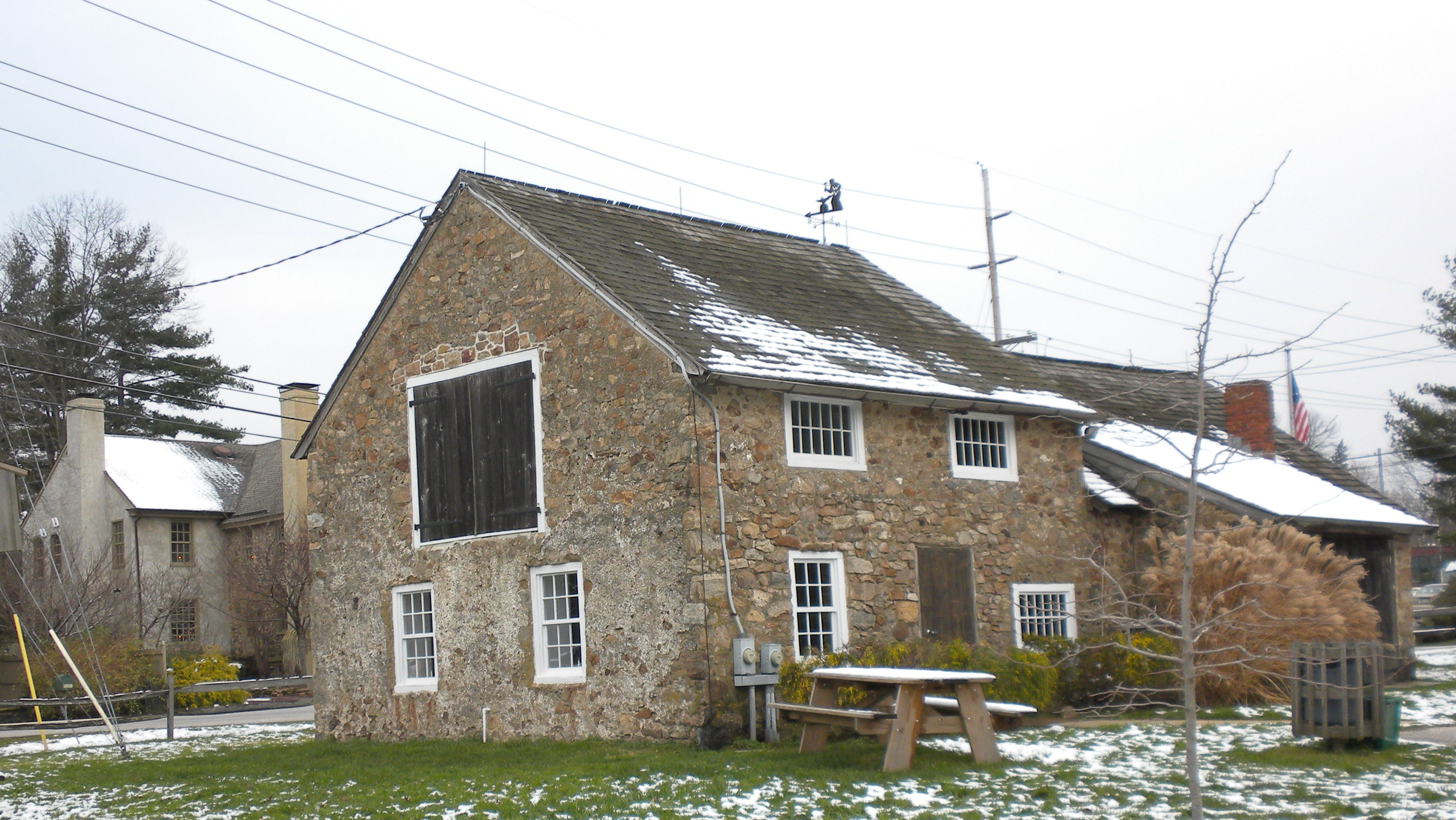
- A former blacksmith shop in the Goshenville Historic District, December 2009

- Location within Pennsylvania Location within the United States
- Location: Mainly along N. Chester Rd., jct. with East Boot Road, East Goshen Township, Pennsylvania
- Coordinates: 39°59′31″N 75°32′35″W
- Area: 26 acres (11 ha)
- Architectural style: Colonial, Greek Revival
- NRHP reference No.: 00001347
- Added to NRHP: November 8, 2000

The Goshenville Historic District is a national historic district, which is located in East Goshen Township, Chester County, Pennsylvania. It encompasses eleven contributing buildings, two contributing sites and two contributing structures in the crossroads village of Goshenville.

It was listed on the National Register of Historic Places in 2000.

== History and architectural features ==
The structures in this historic district date to the 18th and 19th centuries, and are reflective of a number of popular architectural styles including Greek Revival. They include residences, 1790s-era farmhouses, a tenant house that was built circa 1750, the Goshen Friends Meetinghouse, which was erected in 1849, a Hicksite Meetinghouse (1855) and burial ground, a general store and post office that were built in 1800, and a blacksmith/wheelwright shop that was erected sometime around 1740.
