= Primitive Hall =

Historic house in Pennsylvania, United States

- U.S. National Register of Historic Places
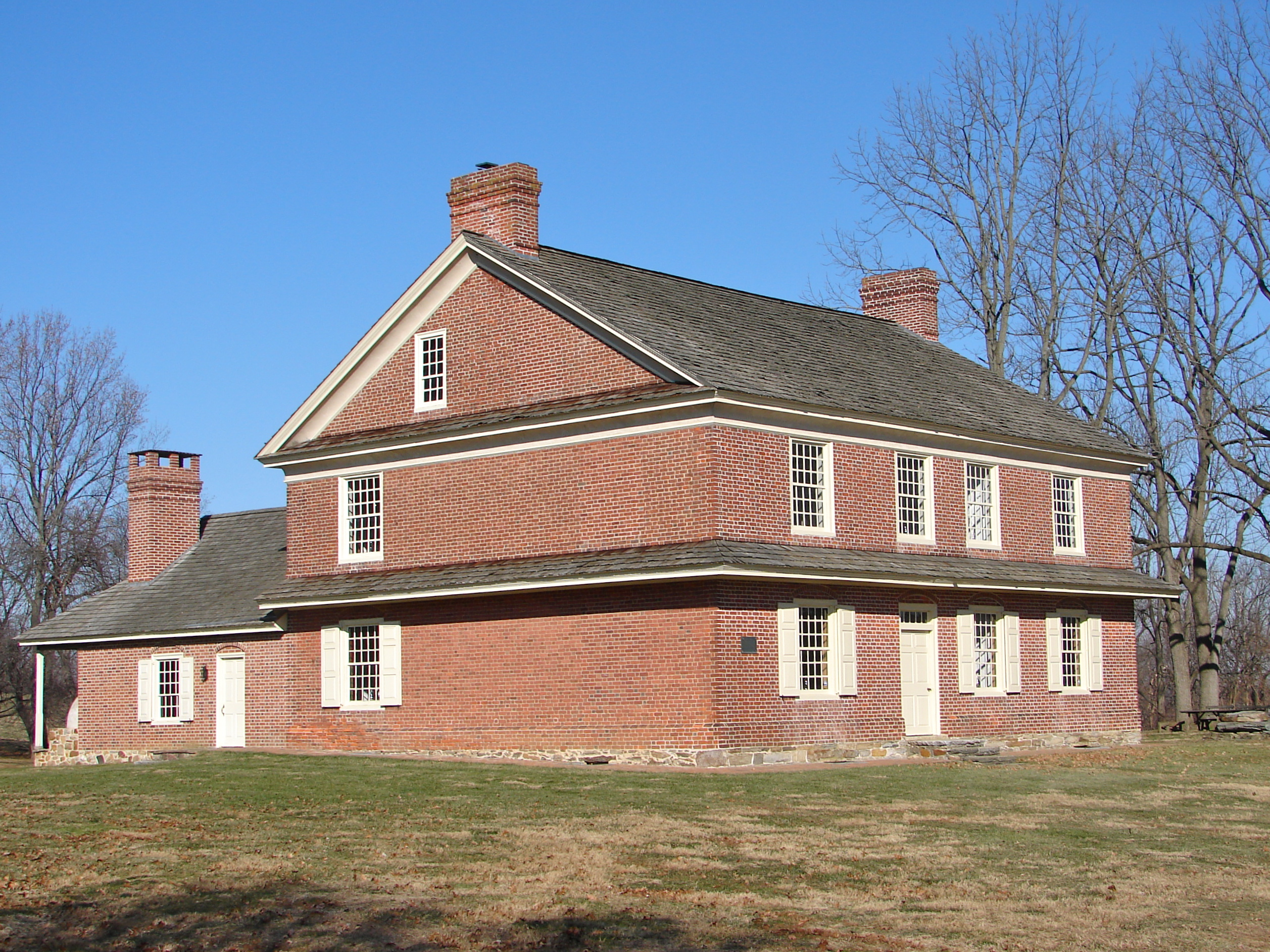

- Location within Pennsylvania Location within the United States
- Nearest city: Kennett Square, Pennsylvania
- Coordinates: 39°52′33″N 75°50′2″W
- Area: 5 acres (2.0 ha)
- Built: 1738
- Architectural style: Georgian
- NRHP reference No.: 75001629
- Added to NRHP: March 19, 1975

Primitive Hall is a brick house built in 1738 in rural Chester County, Pennsylvania, United States, by Joseph Pennock. The house was occupied by his descendants until 1960, when it was donated to and restored by a foundation controlled by his descendants. The house was listed by the National Register of Historic Places in 1975.

== History ==
Joseph Pennock (1677–1771) made a mysterious note in his Bible concordance dated September 14, 1738, "then my impostum brok and the Seme year I Bilt my nu Hous" which is taken to mean that Primitive Hall was built in 1738. He was born near Clonmel, Tipperary County, Ireland, and acquired the land in 1703 as a result of a 1683 purchase of 5,000 acres from William Penn by his grandfather, George Collet. Of the original 1,250 acres in West Marlborough Township conveyed by the purchase, Pennock kept 700 acres throughout his lifetime and gave the rest to one of his sons. He was a merchant in Philadelphia and used Primitive Hall as a country estate. Though he was a Quaker all or most of his life, one source reports that he was not a member of the Society of Friends at the time of his marriage.

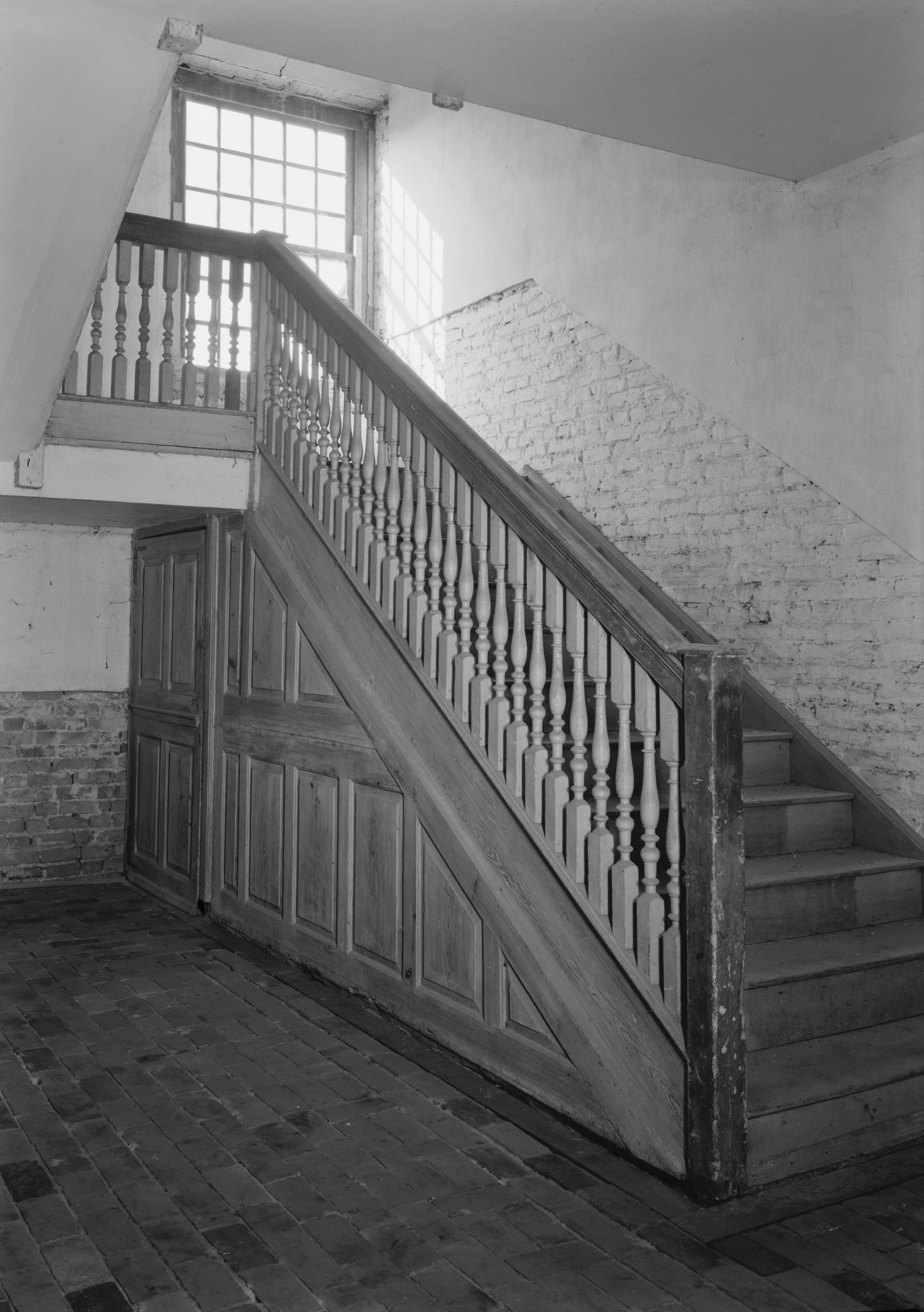
Stairway on the ground floor of the central hall in 1960

Joseph married Mary Levis in 1705 and moved to West Marlborough Township by 1714. Mary bore 12 children and died in 1748. The foundations of a circa 1710 house are nearby. The family presumably lived in this house before moving into their new house, Primitive Hall, by 1740. During the early 1700s West Marlborough Township was on the frontier and Joseph reportedly left food out for Native Americans who would drop in and sleep in the central hall.

Joseph was a member of the Pennsylvania Assembly from 1716 to 1744 and was also a Justice of the peace, performing his judicial duties in the old Chester Courthouse. Iron bars in one of the cellar windows suggest that the cellar was used as a jail until the accused were transported to Chester. Joseph's son, Nathaniel, also served in the Pennsylvania Assembly, until his resignation in 1756 at the start of the French and Indian War, on the basis that a Quaker should not be a part of a government that was in a state of war.

The house is furnished with much of its original furniture, including a settle bench that folds out into a bed. A table that Joseph bought from the old Chester Courthouse, the largest of its kind in the United States, still stands in the center hall of the house. The name "Primitive Hall" was first recorded about 1846 but is believed to be much older.

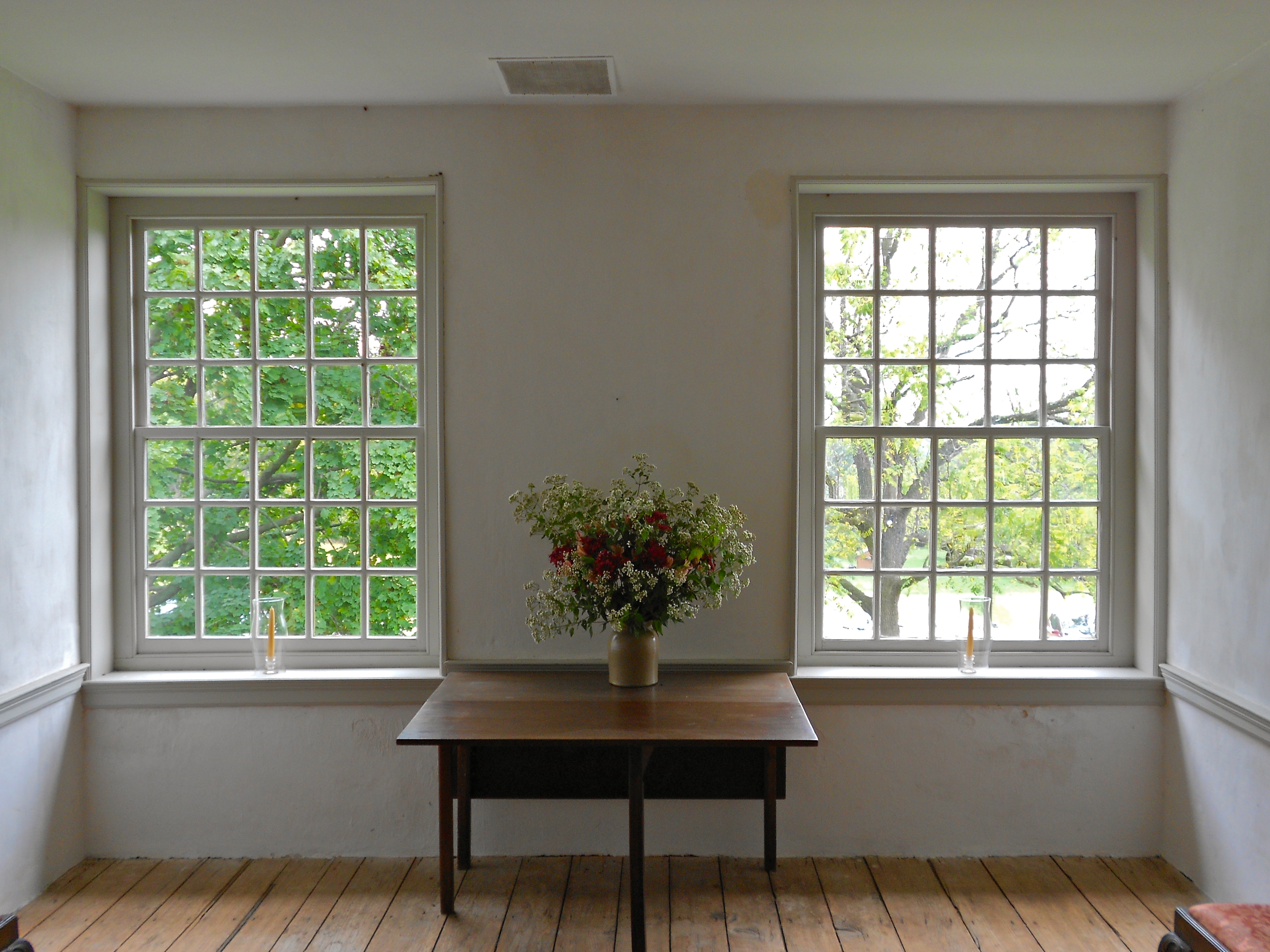
The third-floor hall, looking out two 15-over-15 windows

The building faces south and measures 52' 2" across the front and 40' along the sides. It was adapted from standard plans developed by William Penn for townhouses in Philadelphia - more precisely, it is two standard townhouses placed side by side, with a large brick floored center hall in between. The east and west sections each have a separate cellar and a separate chimney, but the central hall does not have a cellar. Corner fireplaces in each room connected to the section's single chimney. A staircase in the central hall ascends from the first to the third floor. A dozen of the house's windows were very large for their time, typically including 30 individual panes. A modern one-story brick kitchen was added to the north side of the house sometime after 1971.

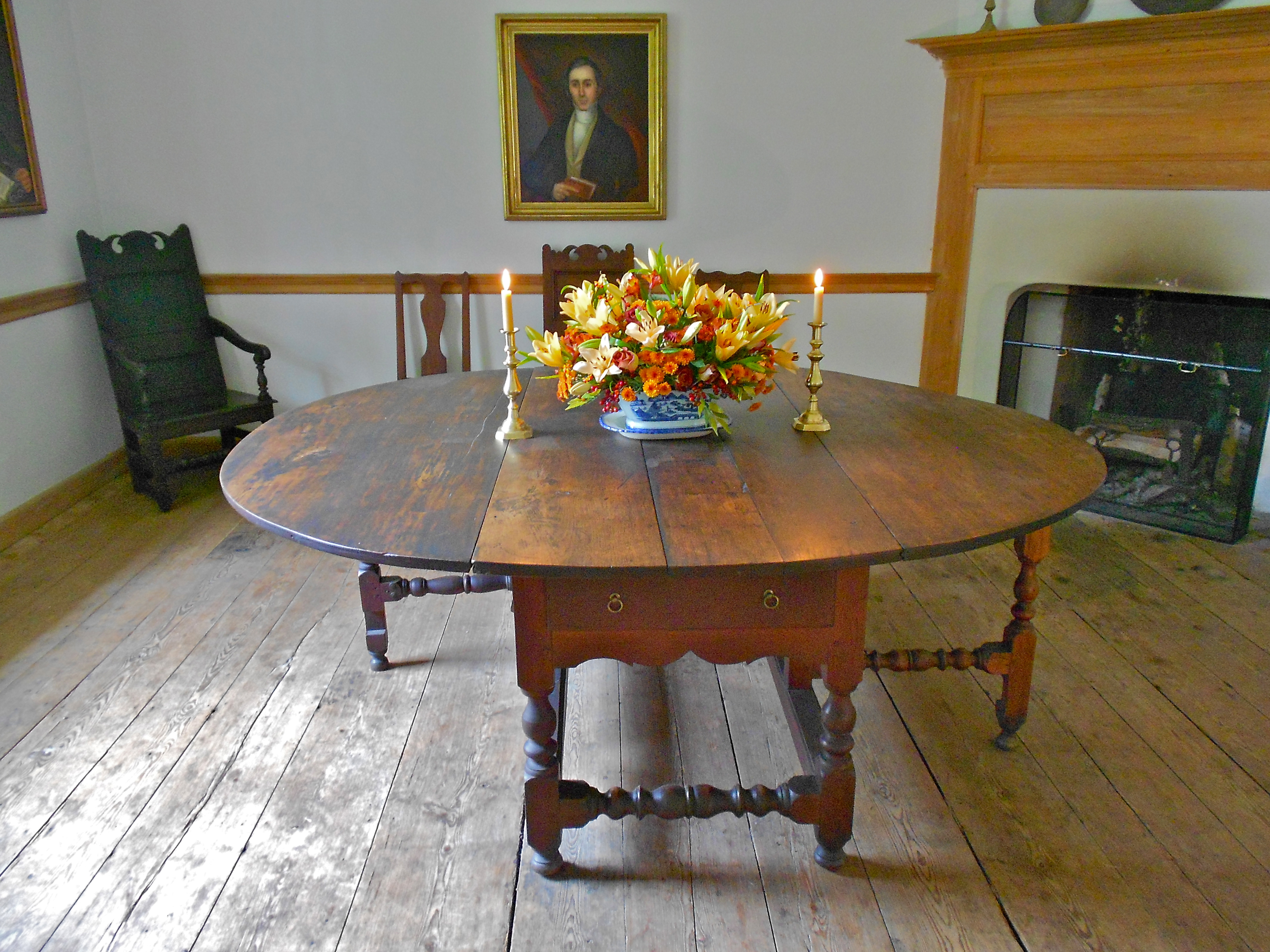
Gate leg table owned by Joseph Pennock

The house is closely associated with the owners of the Lukens Steel Company of Coatesville, Pennsylvania. Isaac Pennock, a son or grandson of Joseph, started in the iron business in the 1790s. The business expanded under his son-in-law, Dr. Charles Lukens, and after Lukens's death in 1825, under Isaac's daughter, Rebecca Pennock Lukens. She was one of the first women owner-managers of a major industrial enterprise in the United States. After Rebecca's retirement in 1847, the business was run by her son-in-law Dr. Charles Huston. Stewart Huston, Charles's grandson, was a long-time executive of Lukens Steel and the last occupant of Primitive Hall, with ownership of the house never having left the family. In 1960 he deeded the house to the Primitive Hall Foundation, whose board is composed of descendants of Joseph Pennock.

External videos
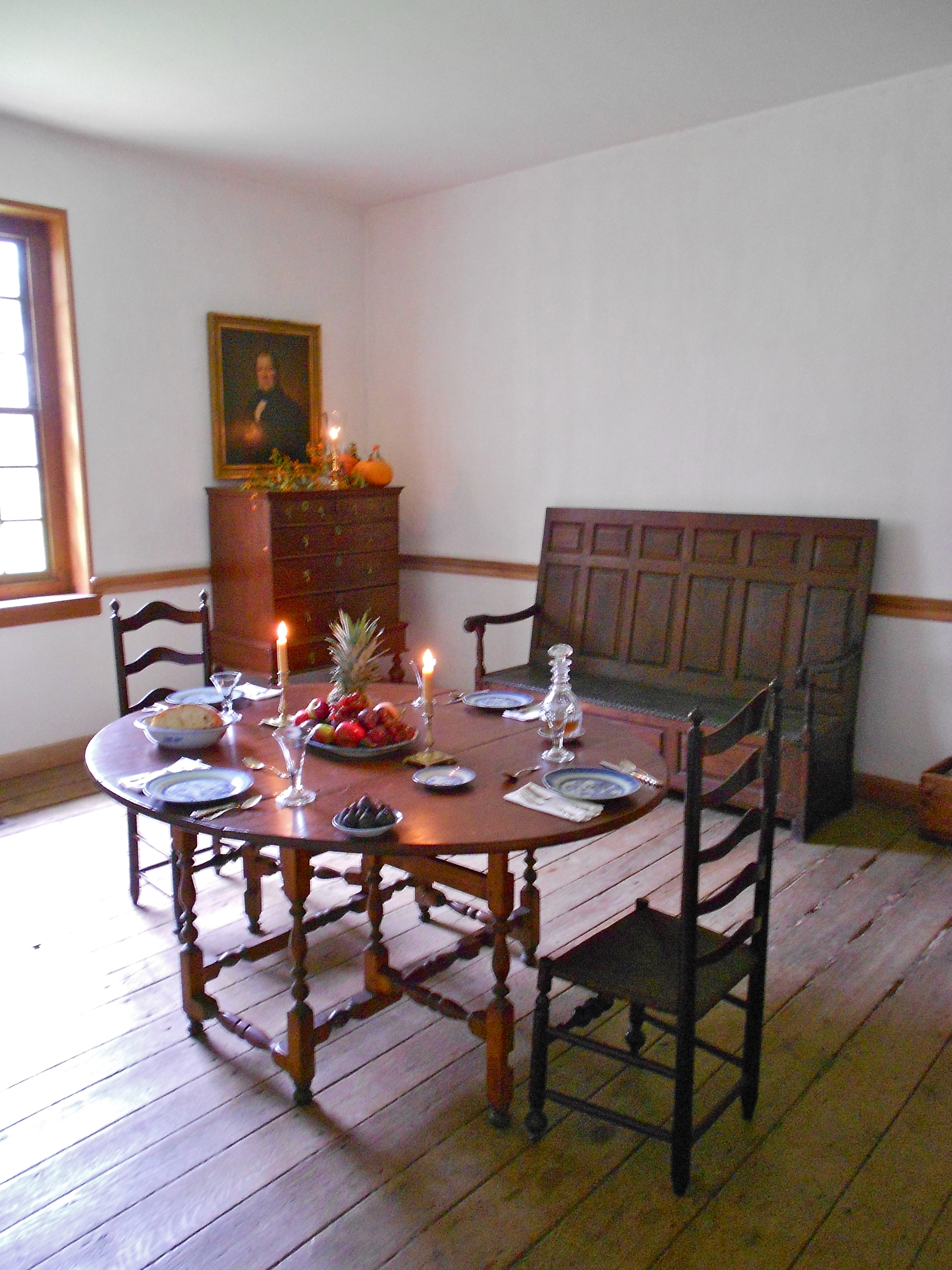
- "Primitive Hall"

== See also ==
- Herb Pennock
- National Register of Historic Places listings in Chester County, Pennsylvania
- West Marlborough Township, Pennsylvania

== Sources ==
- Lukens Steel — A Brief History, The Stewart Huston Charitable Trust, accessed January 26, 2011.
- "Primitive Hall (film)". Dave Brown, Trish Scott, Primitive Hall Foundation. 2006.
- Huston, Stewart, From Rambles: Seven scenic driving tours in and around Chester County, accessed January 28, 2011.
- Schooler, Alice Kent, 1971, NRHP Nomination Form for Primitive Hall Enter "public" for ID and "public" for password to access the site.
- Smith, George (1862). History of Delaware County, Pennsylvania: from the discovery of the territory ... H.B. Ashmead. p. 581.
