= James Fitzpatrick (outlaw) =

18th-century American outlaw

- Born: 1748; Doe Run, Pennsylvania, Colonial America
- Died: September 26, 1778 (aged 29–30); Chester, Pennsylvania, United States
- Cause of death: Execution by hanging
- Other names: Sandy Flash
- Occupation: Highwayman
- Years active: 1777–1778

James Fitzpatrick (1748 – September 26, 1778), also known as Sandy Flash, was an American highwayman who operated in Chester and Delaware counties west of Philadelphia, Pennsylvania, during the American Revolutionary War. A Continental Army deserter, Fitzpatrick defected to the Loyalist side and entered folklore as a swashbuckling Robin Hood figure. He was popularized as a character named Sandy Flash in Bayard Taylor’s novel The Story of Kennett, published in 1866.

== Early life ==
Fitzpatrick was born in 1748 in the village of Doe Run in West Marlborough Township, Chester County, Pennsylvania, the son of a working-class Scots-Irish immigrant. In his youth, he completed an apprenticeship with a local blacksmith, John Passmore, and then worked as a journeyman blacksmith and farmhand. Handsome and sandy-haired, Fitzpatrick stood 6 feet 4 inches in height. He excelled at wrestling, running, and other sports. After spotting Fitzpatrick riding home one morning after a dance, a farmer was said to have exclaimed, "He went by like a sandy flash." While most such stories are apocryphal or embellished, they reflect Fitzpatrick's romanticized image.

== Military service ==
Upon the outbreak of the American Revolutionary War in 1775, Fitzpatrick volunteered for the Continental Army and went to Long Island with the Pennsylvania militia in the summer of 1776. Flogged as punishment for some minor infraction, Fitzpatrick deserted, swimming across the Hudson River at night and making his way home. He was arrested in Philadelphia and released from prison on condition that he rejoin the army, whereupon he promptly deserted a second time. In September 1777, Patriot militia from Wilmington, Delaware, attempted to arrest him at the farm where he worked, but Fitzpatrick threatened them with a rifle, forcing them to flee empty-handed.

When British General Sir William Howe invaded Chester County in September 1777, Fitzpatrick joined the British army, guided troop movements, and fought at the Battle of Brandywine. He roamed Chester County and Delaware County (which was part of Chester County until 1789), accosting and robbing Whig militia officers and tax collectors and working as a British scout. Although he claimed the title of captain, there is no evidence that he ever held a British military commission or commanded troops. Notably, many Chester County residents sympathized with the Loyalist cause, while others, including the Quakers who made up 40 percent of the population, remained neutral.

== Outlaw activities ==
After the British withdrew from Philadelphia in June 1778, Fitzpatrick remained behind. He continued to harass the Continental Army and its supporters in the area, waging a personal vendetta against Whigs. On occasion he rode with the Doan Outlaws of Bucks County and partnered with fellow outlaw and boyhood friend Mordecai Dougherty.

Fitzpatrick became notorious for bravado. After robbing two tax collectors, he stripped them, tied them to trees, and flogged them. On another occasion, he captured a militia officer who prided himself on his long hair. After stealing his officer's weapons, Fitzpatrick cut off the man's handsome queue as an added indignity. He once strolled openly into a Kennett Square tavern crowded with Whigs, who stood bragging what they would do to Fitzpatrick once they caught him. The outlaw ordered a drink before he was recognized, whereupon he drew a pistol and backed out, covering himself with a pistol before disappearing into the woods. On yet another occasion, Fitzpatrick attended a public meeting unarmed and in disguise, afterward capturing a boastful young militia officer after fooling him into thinking that an iron candlestick was a blunderbuss.

Despite his campaign of harassment and intimidation, Fitzpatrick was never accused of murdering or seriously wounding anyone. Like Robin Hood, he cultivated a reputation for gallantry and was reported to have given gifts to the poor and to have never stolen from the poor or mistreated a woman.

== Capture and death ==
On August 23, 1778, Fitzpatrick entered the Edgmont home of Robert McAfee, a militia captain, to rob him. McAfee and a servant girl, Rachel Walker, subdued the outlaw after a struggle. The Supreme Executive Council of the Commonwealth of Pennsylvania split the £1000 bounty between them. On September 15, Fitzpatrick was convicted of burglary and highway robbery, crimes to which he confessed, and was sentenced to be hanged. He attempted to escape from prison three times but failed.

Fitzpatrick was hanged on September 26 in a botched public execution. The rope used to hang him was too long, such that when he dropped from the gallows, his toes touched the ground. The hangman actually climbed onto Fitzpatrick's shoulders to force him down, strangling him to death.

Fitzpatrick's confederate, Mordecai Dougherty, was never captured and is thought to have fled to Canada. Tory sympathizers burned the haystacks and maimed the horses of his captor, Captain McAfee, who received £200 in compensation from the revolutionary government in 1783.

== Legacy ==
Fitzpatrick was popularized in two novels, Bayard Taylor’s The Story of Kennett (1866) and Clifton Lisle's Sandy Flash: The Highwayman of Castle Rock (1922). These novels originated the epithet "Sandy Flash," by which Fitzpatrick has entered local folklore. Two Chester County roads have been named Sandy Flash Drive after Fitzpatrick, including the main road within Ridley Creek State Park, named in 1972, and another road located in a private housing estate in Kennett Square, Pennsylvania.

According to local legend, Fitzpatrick buried treasure ("enough to buy Chester County many times over") in a cave in the vicinity of Castle Rock, a rocky hill in the eastern part of Edgmont Township, Pennsylvania, near Crum Creek. No treasure was ever found.
