= Edgmont Township, Pennsylvania =

Township in Pennsylvania, US

- Township
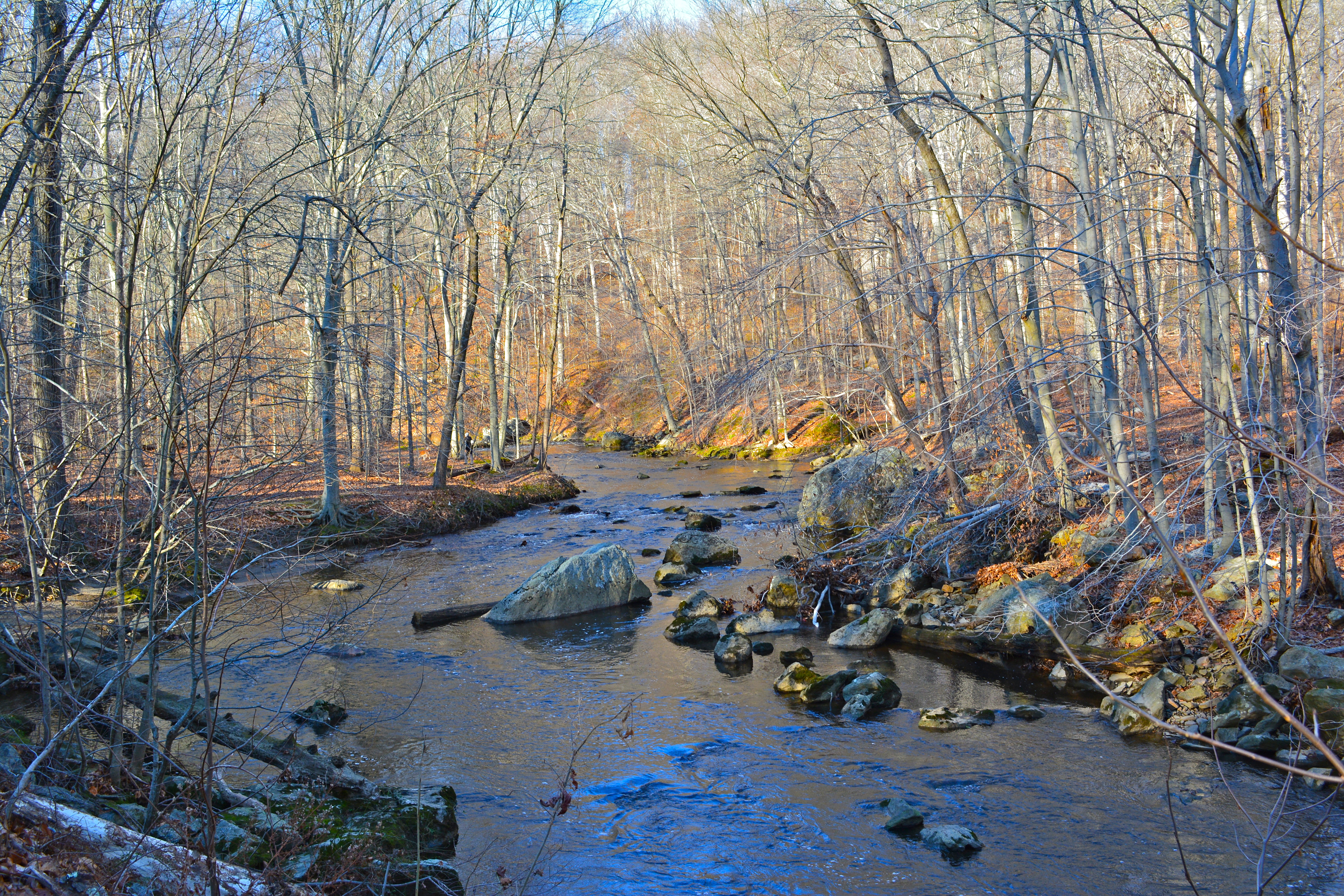
- Ridley Creek

- Seal
- Motto: "The Emerald of Delaware County"
- Location in Delaware County and the state of Pennsylvania.

- Location of Pennsylvania in the United States
- Coordinates: 39°56′56″N 75°28′07″W
- Country: United States
- State: Pennsylvania
- County: Delaware

Area
  - Total: 9.73 sq mi (25.20 km^{2})
  - Land: 9.71 sq mi (25.14 km^{2})
  - Water: 0.023 sq mi (0.06 km^{2})
- Elevation: 469 ft (143 m)

Population (2010)
  - Total: 3,987
  - Estimate (2016): 4,081
  - Density: 420.4/sq mi (162.32/km^{2})
- Time zone: UTC-5 (EST)
  - Summer (DST): UTC-4 (EDT)
- ZIP code: 19028
- Area codes: 484 and 610
- FIPS code: 42-045-22584
- FIPS code: 42-045-22584
- GNIS feature ID: 1216382
- Website: www.edgmont.org

Edgmont Township is a township in Delaware County, Pennsylvania, United States. Edgmont contains the unincorporated community of Gradyville. The population was 3,987 at the 2010 census.

== History and socioeconomics ==
Edgmont Township, otherwise known by the post office name of Edgemont (ZIP Code 19028), is a semi-rural suburban area in western Delaware County. It was one of the first townships in Pennsylvania, founded in the late 1680s. The name is derived from the ancient royal manor of Edgemond in Shropshire, England, where Joseph Baker, one of the earliest settlers to the township, emigrated from. Joseph Baker was the representative for Delaware County in the Provincial Assembly.

Today, Edgmont is home to a rather wide socioeconomic range. Along the rural area along Valley Road are many high-income neighborhoods such as Allee, Okehocking Hills, and Fiveormore. On Delchester Road is the rather posh new neighborhood known as Somerhill. On the major north–south thoroughfare through Edgmont, Providence Road, several upscale single-family homes on large lots predominate as well as other high-income neighborhoods such as Springton Chase and Runnymeade Farms. There is also a retirement home known as White Horse Village. Within Edgmont lies a very tiny village that is not incorporated known as Gradyville (19039). It consists mainly of a post office, a gas station, a flower shop, an antique shop, one or two houses, and an English-language Orthodox church. Though Edgmont has its own post office as mentioned previously, most of the area is served by the Newtown Square post office (19073), the Media post office (19063), or the Glen Mills post office as it delivers mail directly to residences.

== Geography ==
Edgmont Township lies northwest of the center of Delaware County, with its northern border forming the Chester County line. According to the United States Census Bureau, the township has a total area of 9.73 square miles (25.20 km^{2}), of which 9.71 square miles (25.14 km^{2}) is land and 0.02 square miles (0.06 km^{2}), or 0.24%, is water. Crum Creek forms the eastern border of the township, and Ridley Creek flows roughly parallel to it 1 mile (1.6 km) to the west.

Edgmont Township is bordered by the townships of Middletown, Upper Providence, Newtown, and Thornbury in Delaware County, and Willistown in Chester County. The single largest geographic feature of the township is Ridley Creek State Park, comprising 2,600 acres (11 km^{2}) in the eastern part of the township. It is a popular destination for a full range of recreational activities, and it is home to the Colonial Pennsylvania Farmstead, a living history museum where visitors and students can experience colonial farm life in the early 1700s.

== Demographics ==
Historical population
Census	Pop.	Note	%±
1930	874		—
1940	957		9.5%
1950	1,048		9.5%
1960	1,404		34.0%
1970	1,368		−2.6%
1980	1,410		3.1%
1990	2,735		94.0%
2000	3,918		43.3%
2010	3,987		1.8%
2020	4,283		7.4%

As of 2010 census, the racial makeup of the township was 93.7% White, 1.1% African American, 0.1% Native American, 3.8% Asian, 0.3% from other races, and 1.1% from two or more races. Hispanic or Latino of any race were 0.9% of the population.

As of the 2000 census, there were 3,918 people, 1,447 households, and 988 families residing in the township. The population density was 401.7 inhabitants per square mile (155.1/km^{2}). There were 1,515 housing units at an average density of 155.3 per square mile (60.0/km^{2}). The racial makeup of the township was 90.58% White, 4.90% African American, 2.73% Asian, 0.13% Native American, 0.38% from other races, and 1.28% from two or more races. Hispanic or Latino of any race were 1.35% of the population.

There were 1,447 households, out of which 27.7% had children under the age of 18 living with them, 60.4% were married couples living together, 5.4% had a female householder with no husband present, and 31.7% were non-families. 28.6% of all households were made up of individuals, and 18.1% had someone living alone who was 65 years of age or older. The average household size was 2.47 and the average family size was 3.08.

In the township, the population was spread out, with 27.9% under the age of 18, 4.1% from 18 to 24, 20.1% from 25 to 44, 26.7% from 45 to 64, and 21.2% who were 65 years of age or older. The median age was 44 years. For every 100 females, there were 94.2 males. For every 100 females age 18 and over, there were 84.6 males.

The median income for a household in the township was $88,303, and the median income for a family was $105,311. Males had a median income of $76,438 versus $42,371 for females. The per capita income for the township was $46,848. About 0.5% of families and 1.2% of the population were below the poverty line, including 1.4% of those under age 18 and none of those age 65 or over.

== Transportation ==
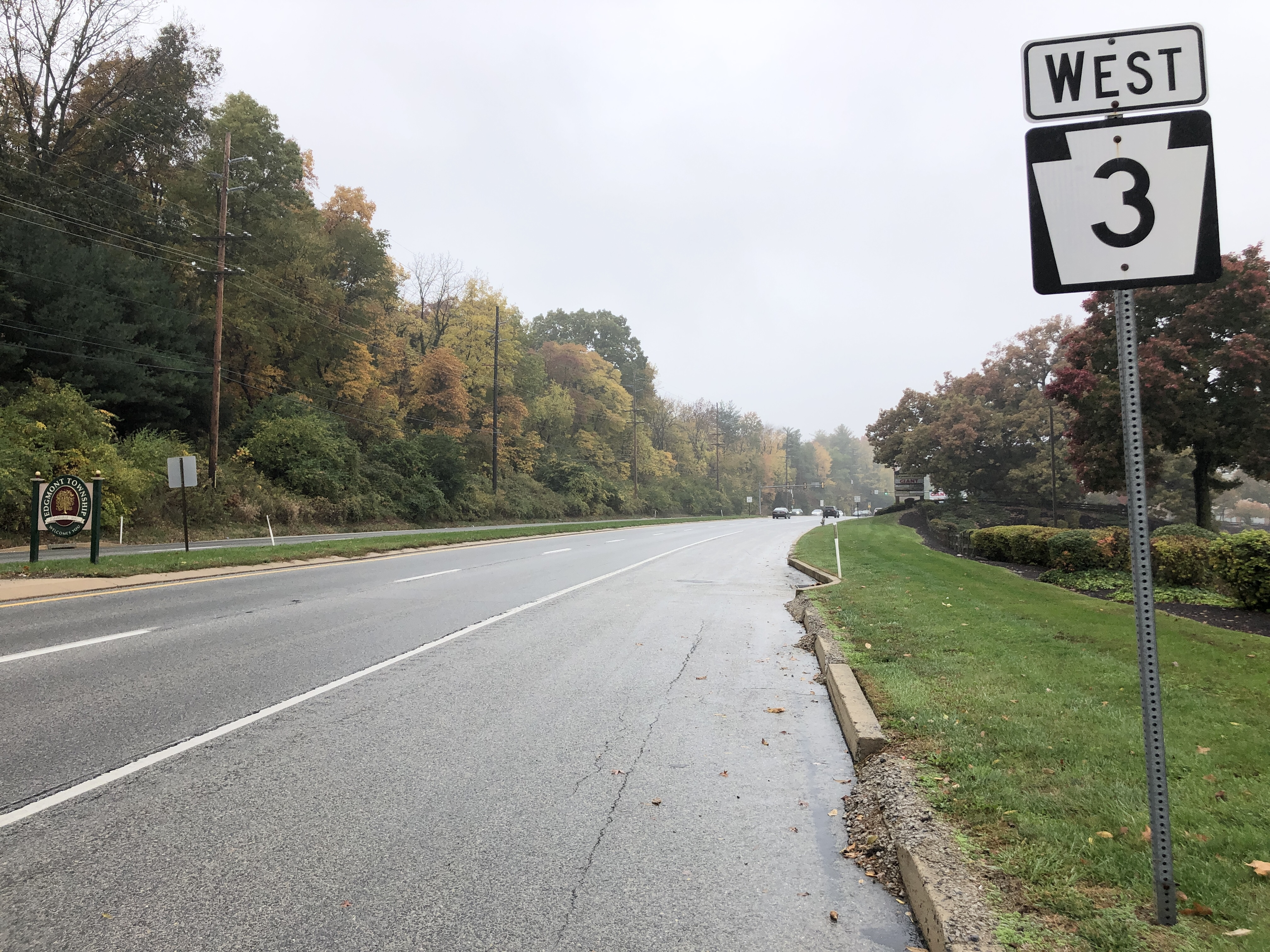
PA Route 3 westbound in Edgmont Township

As of 2021, there were 32.35 miles (52.06 km) of public roads in Edgmont Township, of which 14.53 miles (23.38 km) were maintained by Pennsylvania Department of Transportation (PennDOT) and 17.82 miles (28.68 km) were maintained by the township.

Major routes through and around Edgmont include Pennsylvania Route 3 (West Chester Pike) and Pennsylvania Route 352 (Middletown Road).

SEPTA provides Suburban Bus service to the West Chester Pike corridor in Edgmont Township along Route 104, which runs between West Chester University in West Chester and 69th Street Transportation Center in Upper Darby Township, and Route 120, which runs between Cheyney University and 69th Street Transportation Center.

== Education ==
Edgmont Township lies within the Rose Tree Media School District. Public school students living within township boundaries attend either Glenwood Elementary School or Rose Tree Elementary School for grades K-5, depending on where they live. However, it was announced in 2021 that a new elementary school will be built in Edgmont Township, with construction scheduled to begin in the spring of 2022. Springton Lake Middle School serves students in grades 6–8, and Penncrest High School serves students in grades 9-12.

== Notable people ==
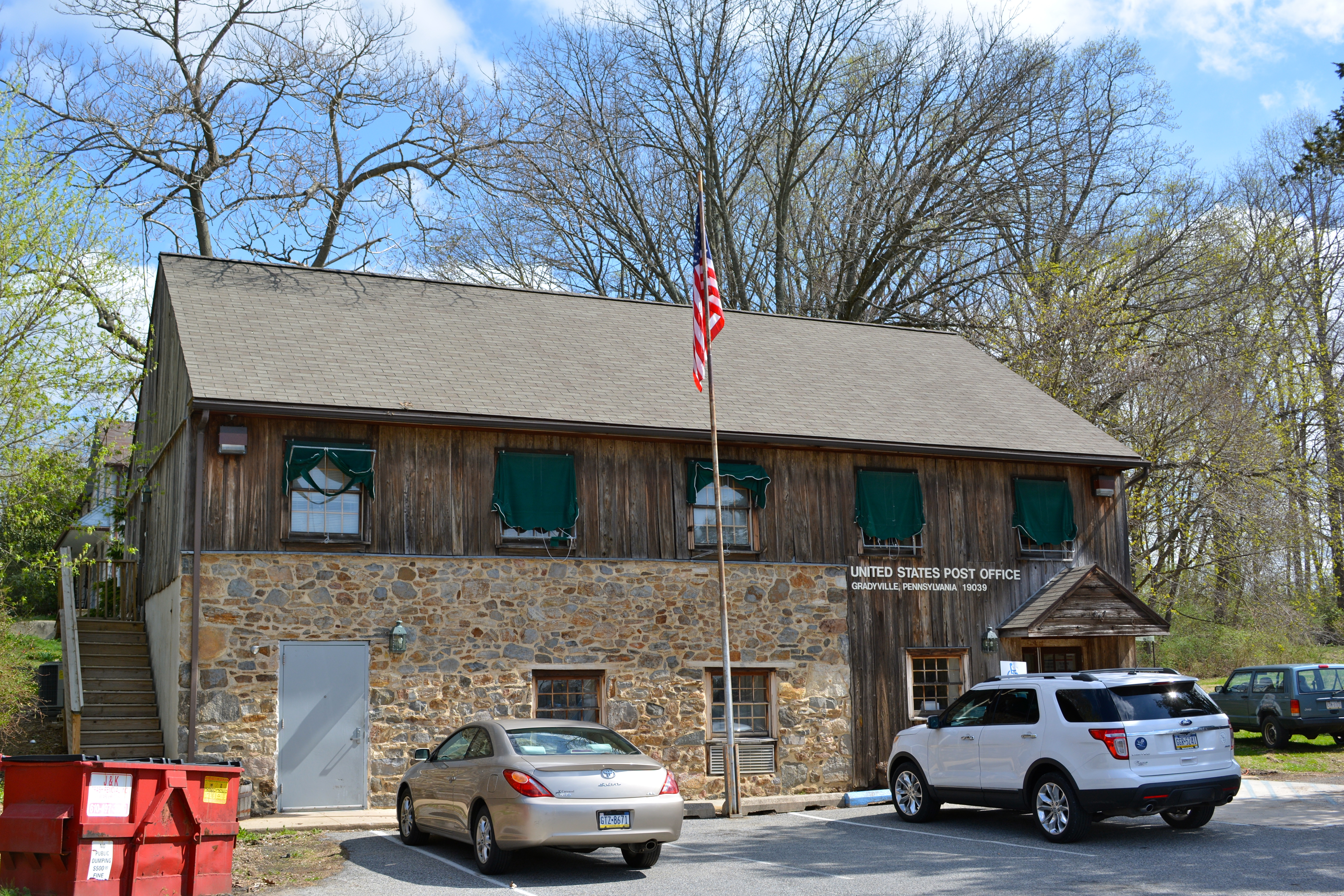
Gradyville Post Office

- William Lewis, Pennsylvania State Representative, U.S. Attorney and U.S. federal judge
- Joe Sestak, U.S. Navy three-star admiral and former U.S. Representative
