= Brinton Run Preserve =

Area in Delaware County, Pennsylvania

Brinton Run Preserve is a protected area in Delaware County, Pennsylvania.

== Description ==
The tract is in the area where the Battle of Brandywine between American and British soldiers was fought on September 11, 1777. The preserve has two 1.5-mile (2.4 km) loop trails.

The agricultural property was acquired for protection in 2021.

It is in Chadds Ford Township. The property is 71.5 acres (28.9 ha). There are no bathrooms and pets are not allowed.

It is open dawn to dusk and managed by North American Land Trust. It is across from the William Brinton 1704 House.

== See also ==
- Alapocas Run State Park – State park in Delaware, United States
- Brandywine Creek State Park – State park in Delaware, United States
- Dilworthtown Historic District – Historic district in Pennsylvania, United States
