= International cricket in 1903 =

International cricket season

The 1903 international cricket season was from April 1903 to September 1903.

== Season overview ==
International tours
Start date	Home team	Away team	Results [Matches]			
Start date	Home team	Away team	Test	ODI	FC	LA
22 June 1903	Marylebone	Philadelphia	—	—	1–0 [1]	—
25 September 1903	Philadelphia	Kent	—	—	0–2 [2]	—

== June ==
=== Philadelphia in England ===
First-class match
No.	Date	Home captain	Away captain	Venue	Result
Match	22–23 June	Not mentioned	John Lester	Lord's, London	Marylebone by 5 wickets

== September ==
=== Kent in Philadelphia ===
First-class match
No.	Date	Home captain	Away captain	Venue	Result
Match	25–28 September	Cuthbert Burnup	John Lester	Philadelphia Cricket Club Ground, Philadelphia	Kent by 7 wickets
Match	2–5 October	Cuthbert Burnup	John Lester	Merion Cricket Club Ground, Philadelphia	Kent by 7 wickets
