= International cricket in 1908 =

International cricket season

The 1908 international cricket season was from April 1908 to August 1908.

== Season overview ==
International tours
Start date	Home team	Away team	Results [Matches]			
Start date	Home team	Away team	Test	ODI	FC	LA
3 August 1908	Ireland	Philadelphia	—	—	0–1 [1]	—
13 August 1908	England	Philadelphia	—	—	0–1 [1]	—

== August ==
=== Philadelphia in Ireland ===
First-class match
No.	Date	Home captain	Away captain	Venue	Result
Match	3–4 August	Francis Browning	John Lester	College Park, Dublin	(Philadelphia) Philadelphians by an innings and 7 runs

=== Philadelphia in England ===
First-class match
No.	Date	Home captain	Away captain	Venue	Result
Match	13–15 August	Not mentioned	John Lester	Lord's, London	(Philadelphia) Philadelphians by 25 runs
