= William Brinton 1704 House =

Historic house in Pennsylvania, United States

- U.S. National Register of Historic Places
- U.S. National Historic Landmark
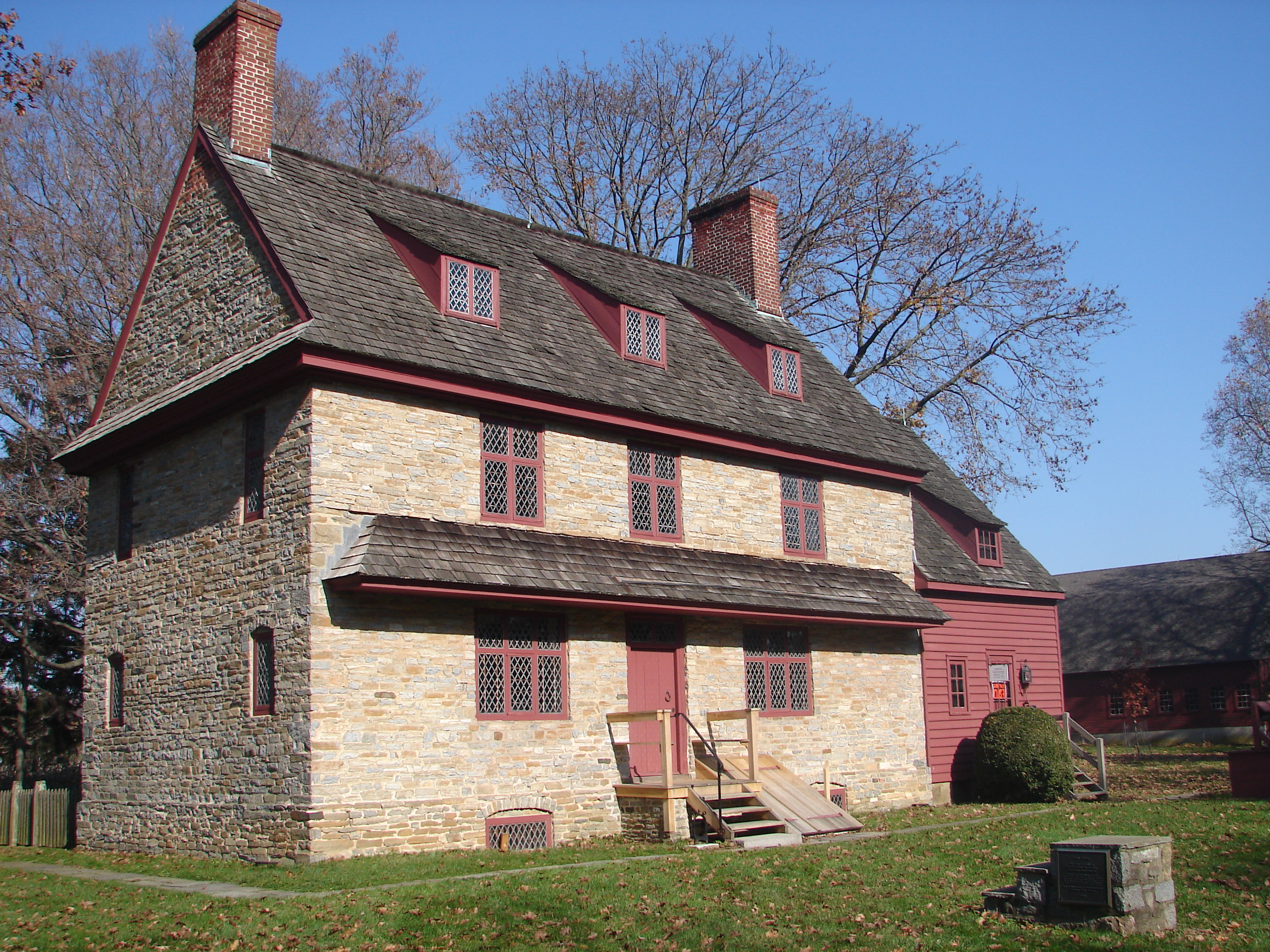
- Brinton 1704 House in 2009

- Location within Pennsylvania Location within the United States
- Location: Oakland Road, near junction of U.S. Route 202 and County Road 15199, near Dilworthtown, Pennsylvania
- Coordinates: 39°53′47″N 75°33′40″W
- Area: 3 acres (1.2 ha)
- Built: 1704
- NRHP reference No.: 67000018

Significant dates
- Added to NRHP: December 24, 1967
- Designated NHL: December 24, 1967

The William Brinton 1704 House is an historic house museum which is located at 21 Oakland Road in Delaware County, Pennsylvania, roughly five miles south of West Chester, Pennsylvania. Built in 1704, it is a well-preserved example of an early Delaware Valley stone house that served as a residence of one family for more than 150 years.

It was designated a National Historic Landmark in 1967, and is open for tours on weekends between May and October, or by appointment. Brinton Run Preserve is across the street.

== History ==
The William Brinton 1704 House was built in 1704 by William Brinton, Jr. (also known as "William the Younger" or "William the Builder"). It was sold out of the family in 1860. In 1881, a serpentine stone wing was added to the home. In 1947, the house was purchased by Brinton descendants. During the 1950s, architect G. Edwin Brumbaugh restored the building to its original form by removing the 1881 wing and other Gothic embellishments.

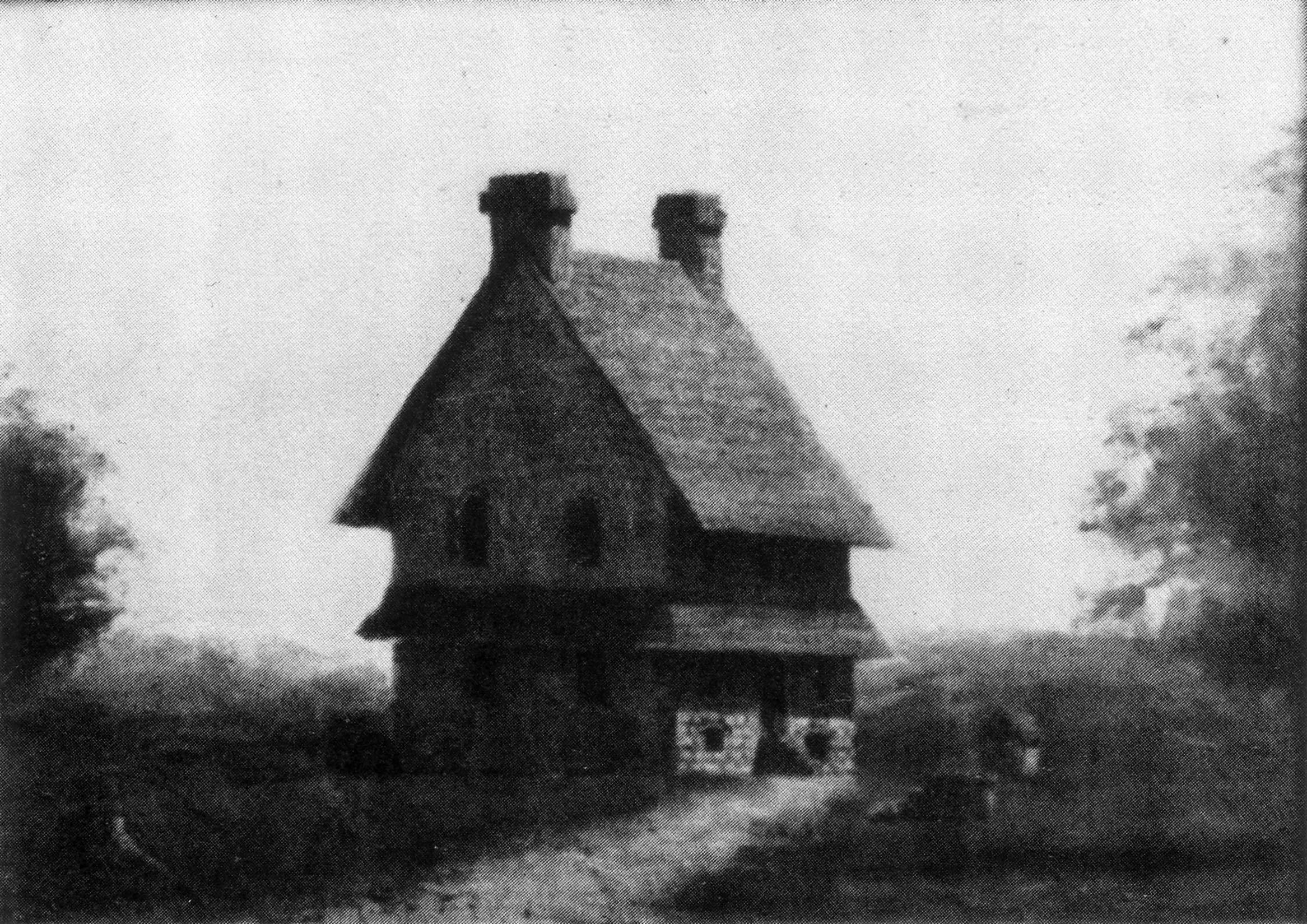
The Brinton House (1878) by Thomas Eakins.

The William Brinton 1704 House was one of the fourteen houses which stood in the battlefield area of the Battle of Brandywine that was fought on September 11, 1777, during the American Revolutionary War. In 1878, Thomas Eakins painted the Brinton House as it would have originally appeared.

== Description ==
The Brinton House stands south of West Chester, on the east side of Oakland Road south of its junction with Brinton's Bridge Road. Its main block is a rectangular stone structure, built out of locally quarried stone laid in courses of irregular height. The walls are 22 inches (56 cm) thick and two stories in height. The end walls each have a brick chimney on the outside. There is a steep roof and pent eaves are in place over the first-floor windows on the north and south sides of the house. The home also boasts twenty-seven reproduction windows of leaded sash with diamond lights. Most of the original flooring is still in use.

The Dilworthtown Historic District is located about half a mile north of the house in Birmingham Township, Chester County, Pennsylvania.

== See also ==
- List of National Historic Landmarks in Pennsylvania
- National Register of Historic Places listings in Delaware County, Pennsylvania
- Dillworth Village Historic District
