= International cricket in 1901 =

International cricket season

The 1901 international cricket season was from April 1901 to September 1901.

== Season overview ==
International tours
Start date	Home team	Away team	Results [Matches]			
Start date	Home team	Away team	Test	ODI	FC	LA
3 June 1901	Marylebone	South Africa	—	—	1–0 [1]	—
5 August 1901	England	Netherlands	—	—	3–0 [5]	—
27 September 1901	Philadelphia	England	—	—	1–2 [3]	—

== June ==
=== South Africa in England ===
Two-day match
No.	Date	Home captain	Away captain	Venue	Result
Match	3–4 June	W. G. Grace	Murray Bisset	Lord's, London	Marylebone by 53 runs

== August ==
=== Holland in England ===
First-class series
No.	Date	Home captain	Away captain	Venue	Result
Match 1	5–6 August	Not mentioned	Not mentioned	Lord's, London	Match drawn
Match 2	7–8 September	Not mentioned	Not mentioned	Bath	Marylebone Gentlemen by an innings and 53 runs
Match 3	8 August	Not mentioned	Not mentioned	Bath	Match drawn
Match 4	9–10 August	Not mentioned	Not mentioned	Kennington Oval, London	Surrey Gentlemen by an innings and 53 runs
Match 5	12–13 August	W. G. Grace	Not mentioned	Crystal Palace, London	London County by an innings and 23 runs

== September ==
=== England in USA ===
First-class series
No.	Date	Home captain	Away captain	Venue	Result
Match 1	27–30 September	John Lester	Bernard Bosanquet	Merion Cricket Club Ground, Philadelphia	Bosanquet's XI by 61 runs
Match 2	4–7 October	John Lester	Bernard Bosanquet	Germantown Cricket Club Ground, Manheim	Gentlemen of Philadelphia by 229 runs
