= Birmingham Friends Meetinghouse =

Historic Quaker meeting house

- Birmingham Friends Meetinghouse and School
- U.S. National Register of Historic Places
- Pennsylvania state historical marker
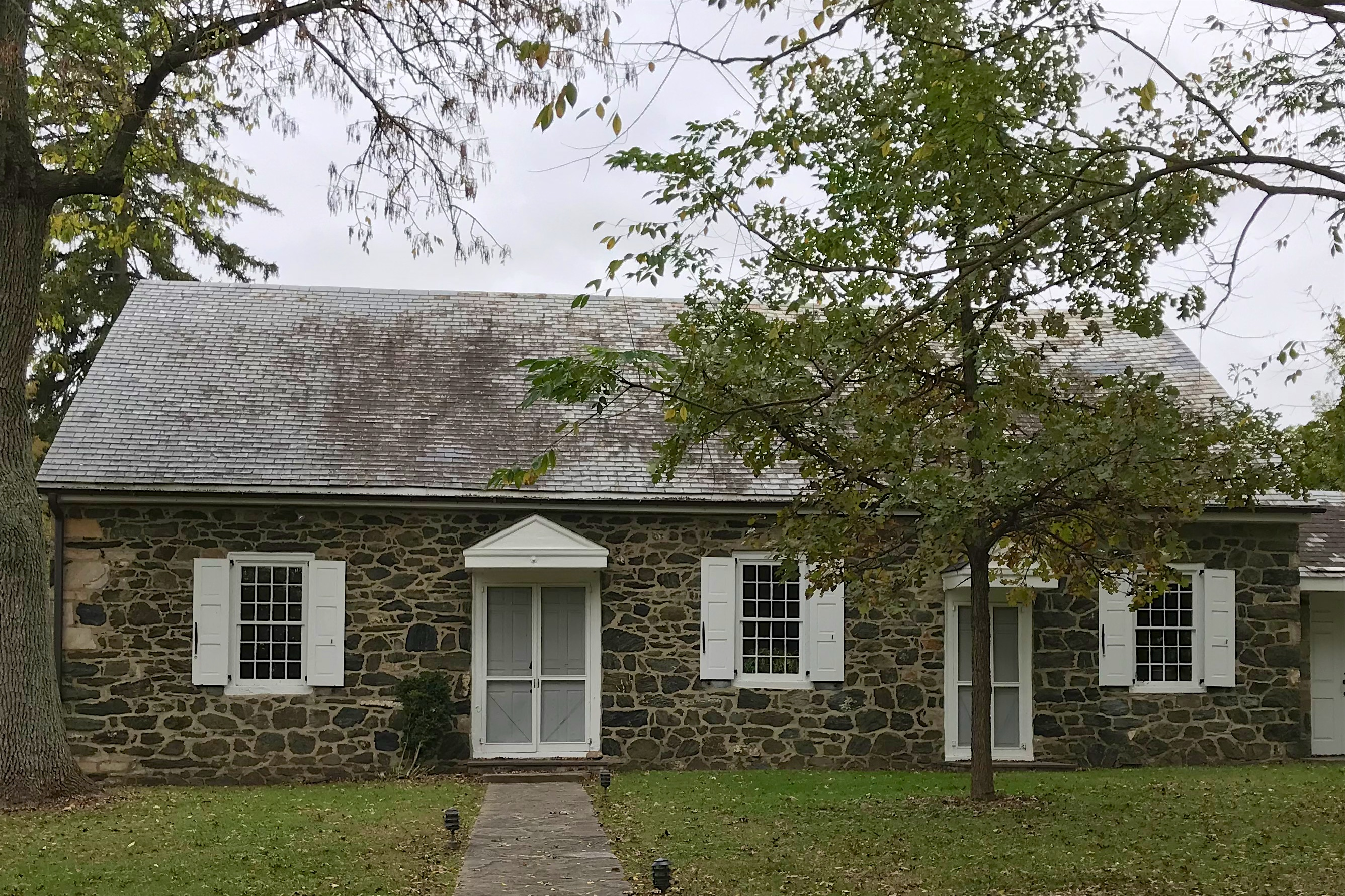
- Front view in 2017

- Location within Pennsylvania Location within the United States
- Location: 1245 Birmingham Road, Birmingham Township, Chester County, Pennsylvania
- Coordinates: 39°54′20″N 75°35′42″W
- Area: 2.4 acres (0.97 ha)
- Built: 1763
- NRHP reference No.: 71000688

Significant dates
- Added to NRHP: July 27, 1971
- Designated PHMC: September 1915

Birmingham Friends Meetinghouse is a historic Quaker meeting house at 1245 Birmingham Road in Birmingham Township, Chester County, Pennsylvania. The current meetinghouse was built in 1763. The building and the adjacent cemetery were near the center of fighting on the afternoon of September 11, 1777 at the Battle of Brandywine. Worship services are held weekly at 10am. The meetinghouse and adjacent octagonal schoolhouse were listed on the National Register of Historic Places as Birmingham Friends Meetinghouse and School on July 27, 1971.

== History ==
The first Quaker meeting in Birmingham Township was held about 1690. In 1718 a meetinghouse was built from red cedar logs. A burial ground, surrounded by a stone wall, was established in the 1750s. The building was made out of stone in 1763 and measured 38 by 41 feet. During the Battle of Brandywine, the British forces attempted to flank the Continental forces under General George Washington. The Continental forces rushed north to meet the British in the area of the meetinghouse. It was used as a hospital first for the Americans, and after the battle for British officers. The stone wall around the cemetery was used as a defensive position by the Americans. After the battle, dead British and American soldiers shared a common grave in the cemetery.

The meetinghouse was enlarged in 1819 and an octagonal school was completed in August, 1819 at a cost of $712.57. The school was used off and on through 1905 and is included in the NRHP site. In 1968 Quaker architect Mather Lippincott designed a new education building to the north of the meeting house.

The school is now used as The Peace Center at Birmingham.

From 1845 to 1923 a group of Quakers worshipped a few hundred yards south at the Orthodox Meetinghouse as a result of the Hicksite-Orthodox split. That meetinghouse is listed separately on the NRHP.

== Gallery ==
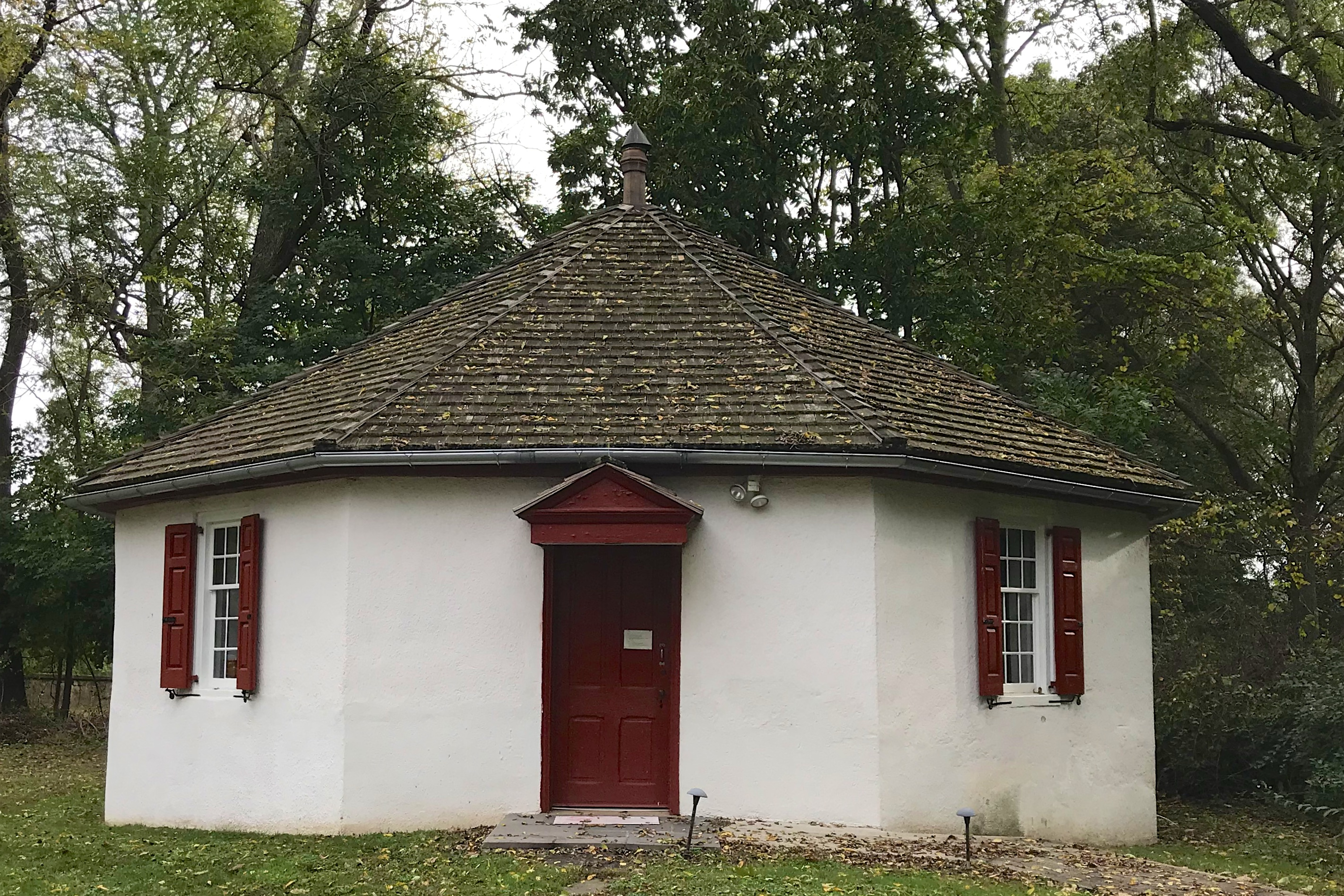
The octagonal school next to the meetinghouse.

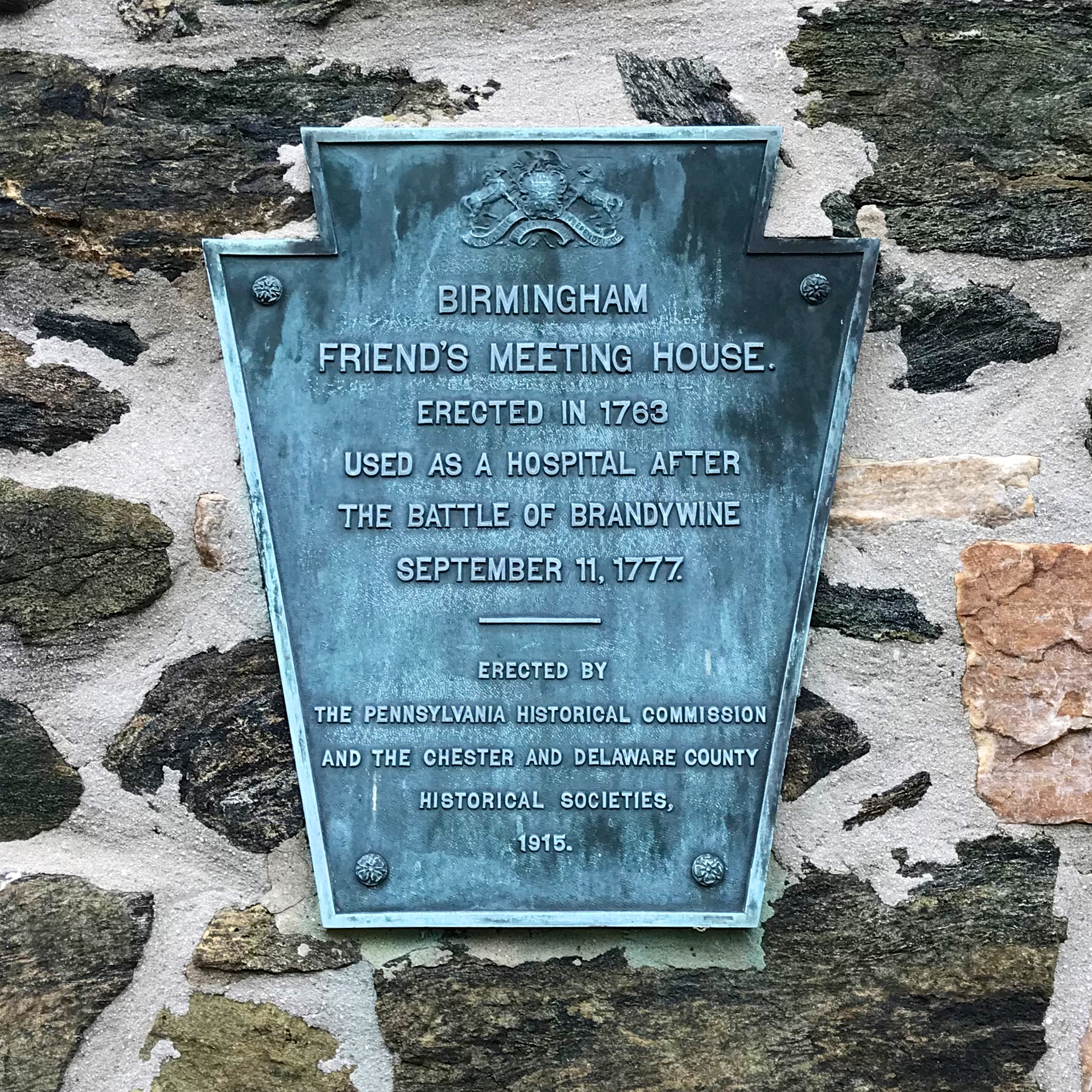
1915 Historical Marker

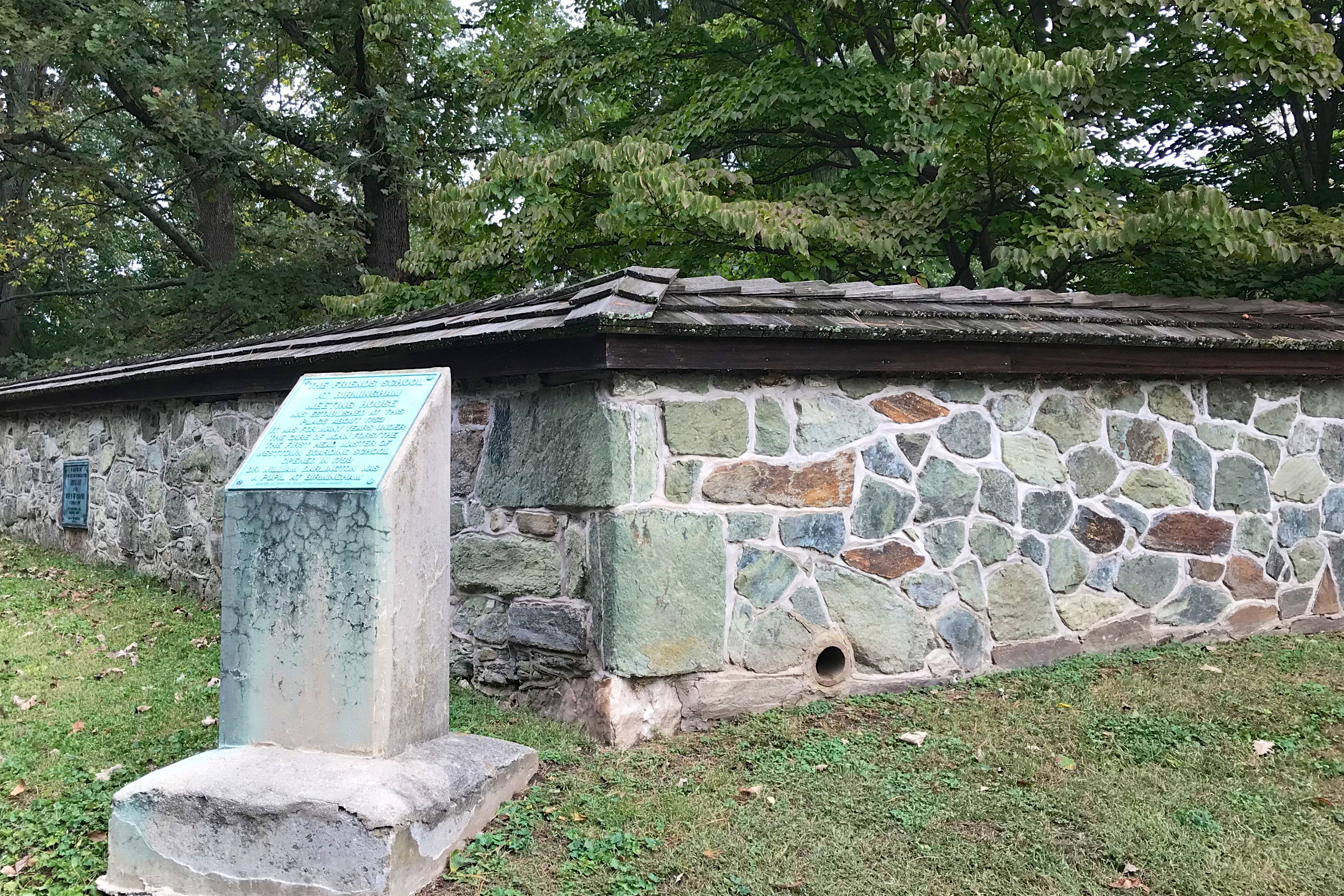
Defensive stone wall position at the Birmingham Friends Burial Grounds.

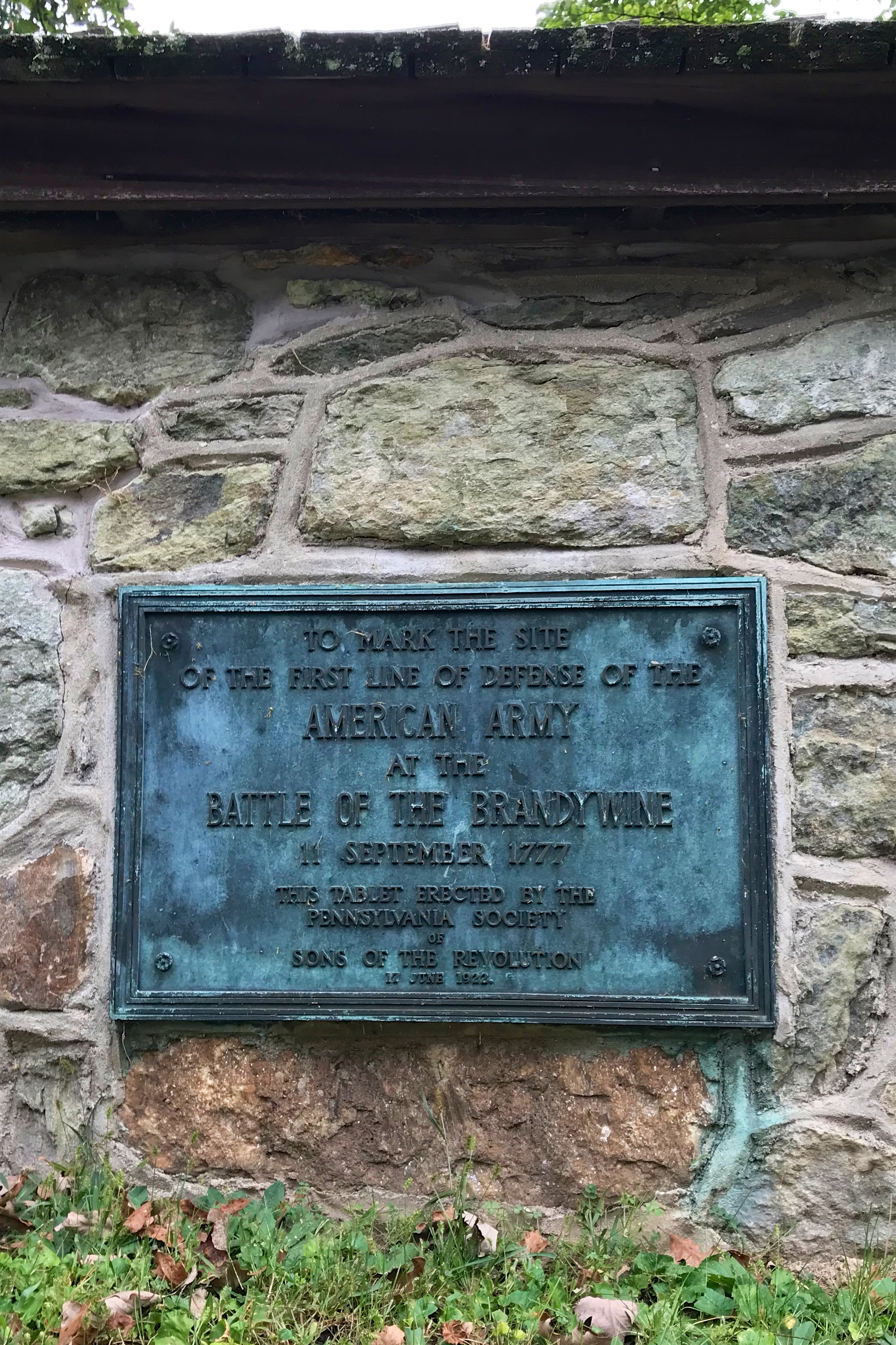
1922 plaque marking line of defense

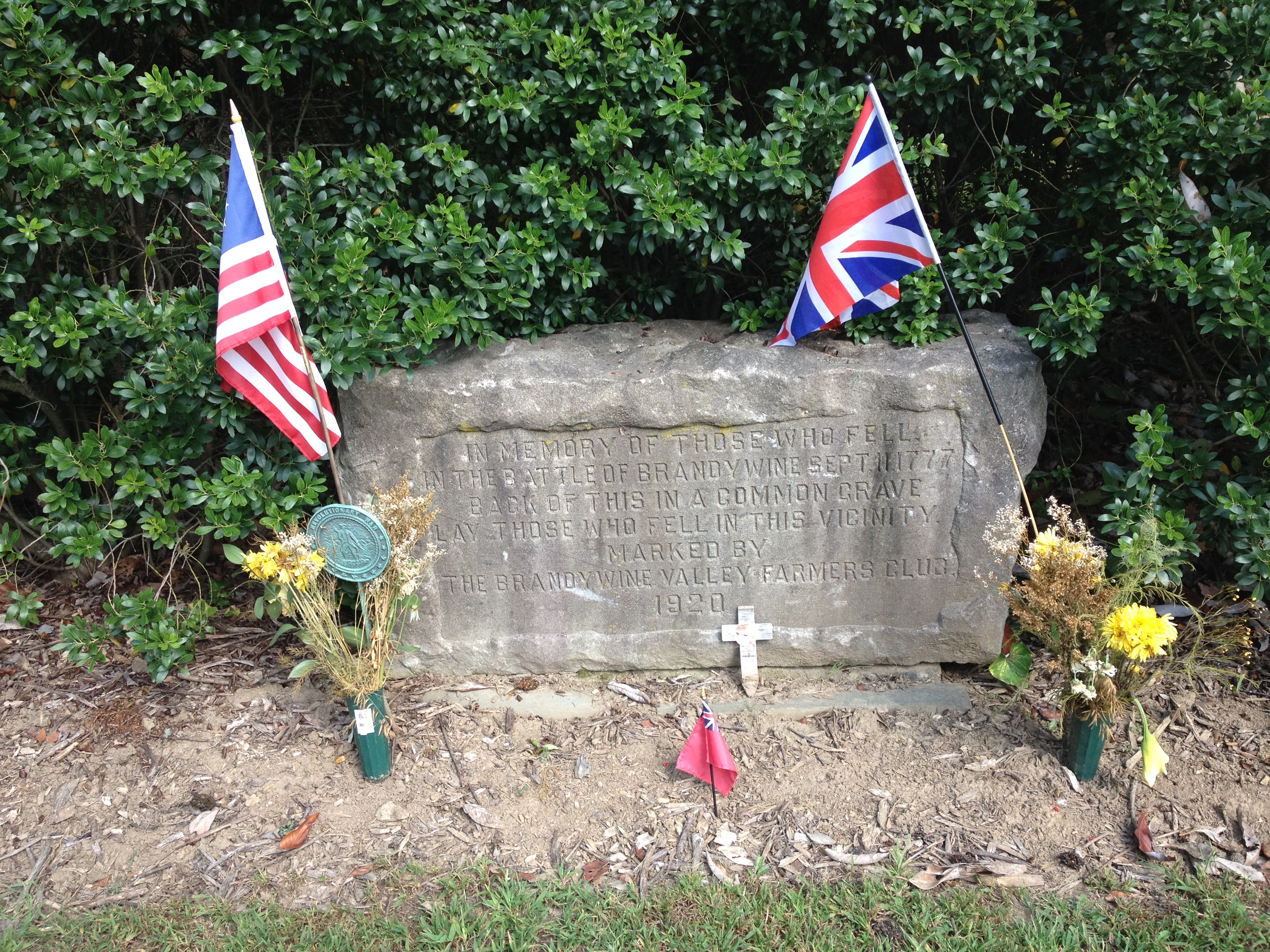
Common grave memorial stone on the Brandywine battlefield, Birmingham Friends Burial Grounds.
