= Edward Brinton House =

Historic house in Pennsylvania, United States

- U.S. National Register of Historic Places
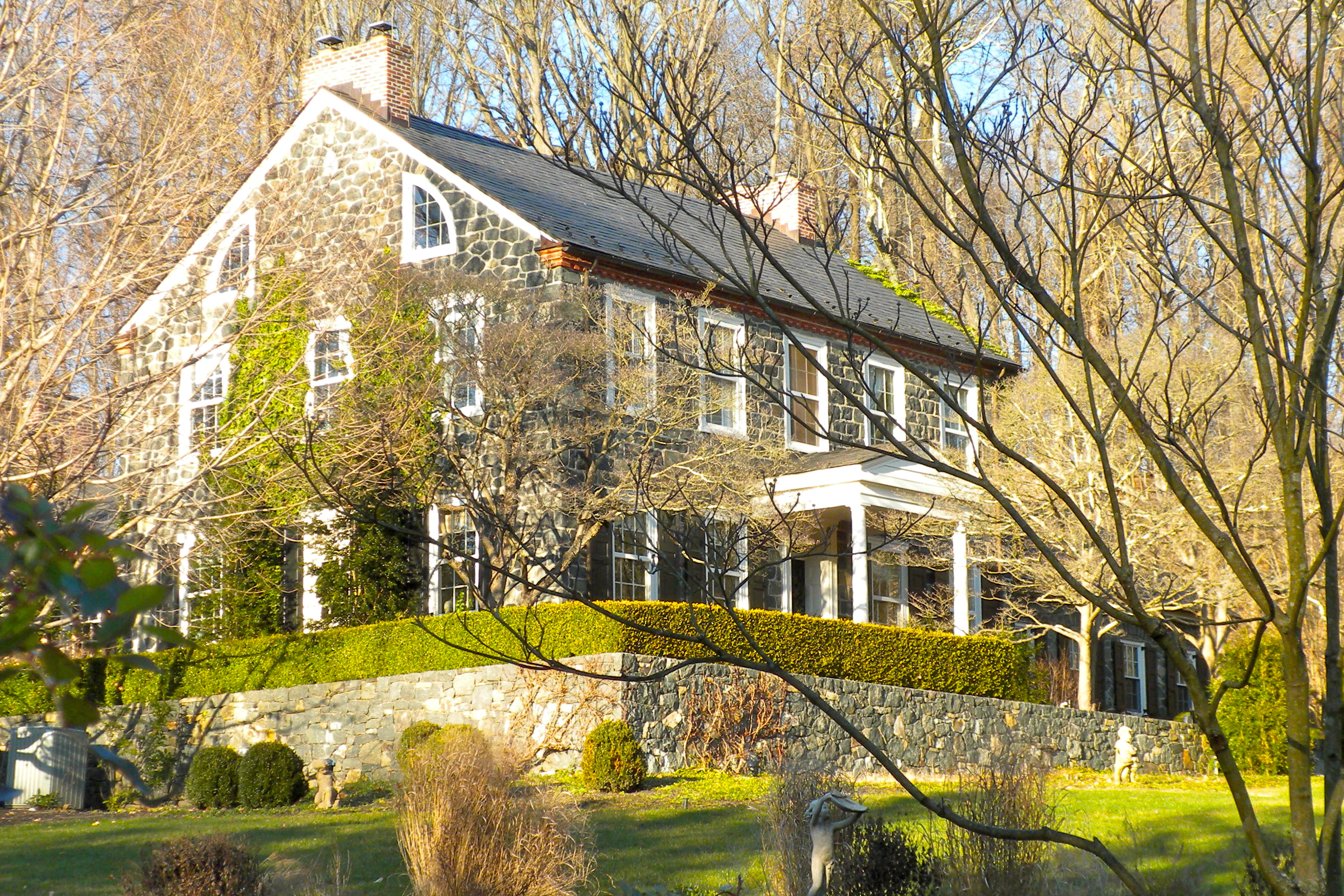
- Edward Brinton House, December 2009

- Location within Pennsylvania Location within the United States
- Location: Northwest of Chadds Ford at 1325 Creek Road, Birmingham Township, Pennsylvania
- Coordinates: 39°53′17″N 75°36′29″W
- Area: 9.8 acres (4.0 ha)
- Built: 1839
- Built by: Brinton, Edward
- Architectural style: Georgian
- NRHP reference No.: 73001599
- Added to NRHP: June 19, 1973

Edward Brinton House is a historic home located in Birmingham Township, Chester County, Pennsylvania. The house was built in 1839 and is a 2 1/2-story, five-bay, double pile, Georgian-style fieldstone dwelling with a gable roof. It has a 1 1/2-story stone summer kitchen addition.

It was added to the National Register of Historic Places in 1973.
