= Dilworthtown, Pennsylvania =

Unincorporated community in Pennsylvania, US

- Census-designated place
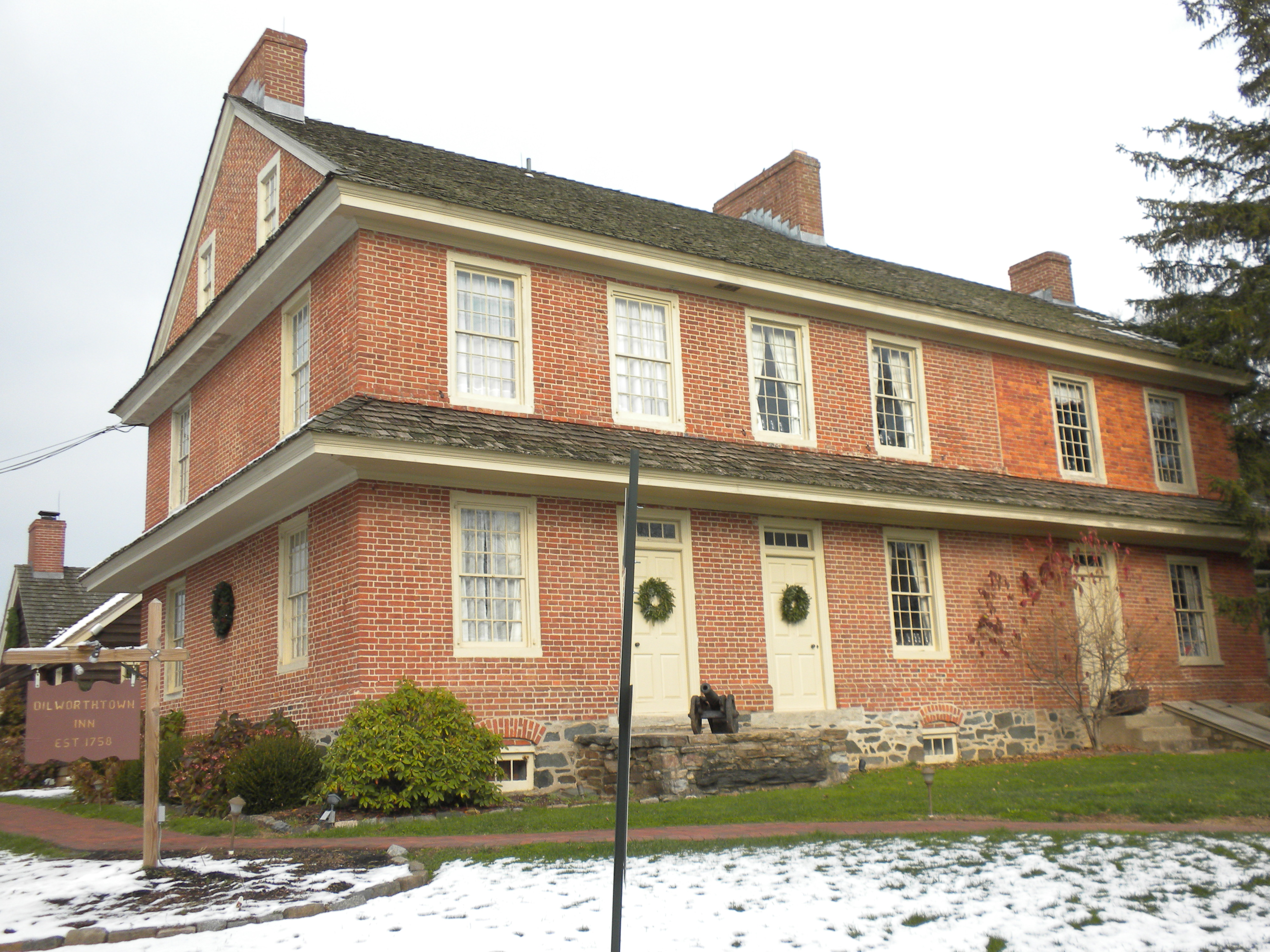
- Dilworthtown Inn

- Location in Chester County and the U.S. state of Pennsylvania

- Location within Pennsylvania Location within the United States
- Coordinates: 39°53′58″N 75°34′1″W
- Country: United States
- State: Pennsylvania
- Counties: Chester; Delaware
- Townships: Birmingham; Chadds Ford

Area
  - Total: 0.64 sq mi (1.65 km^{2})
  - Land: 0.63 sq mi (1.64 km^{2})
  - Water: 0 sq mi (0.00 km^{2})
- Elevation: 465 ft (142 m)

Population (2020)
  - Total: 1,150
  - Density: 1,812.2/sq mi (699.68/km^{2})
- Time zone: UTC-5 (Eastern (EST))
  - Summer (DST): UTC-4 (EDT)
- ZIP Code: 19382 (West Chester)
- Area codes: 610/484
- FIPS code: 42-19232
- GNIS feature ID: 2805484

Dilworthtown is an unincorporated community and census-designated place (CDP) in Chester and Delaware counties, Pennsylvania, United States. It was first listed as a CDP prior to the 2020 census.

The CDP is primarily in southeastern Chester County but extends south into western Delaware County. The Chester County part of the community is in Birmingham Township, while the Delaware County part is in Chadds Ford Township. U.S. Route 202 forms the eastern border of the CDP; the highway leads north 4 miles (6 km) to West Chester and south 11 miles (18 km) to Wilmington, Delaware.

The Dilworthtown Historic District, listed on the National Register of Historic Places, occupies the crossroads of Brintons Bridge Road, Oakland Road, Birmingham Road, and Old Wilmington Pike at the historic center of town.

== Demographics ==
Historical population
Census	Pop.	Note	%±
2020	1,150		—
U.S. Decennial Census
