= George Brinton House =

Historic house in Pennsylvania, United States

- U.S. National Register of Historic Places
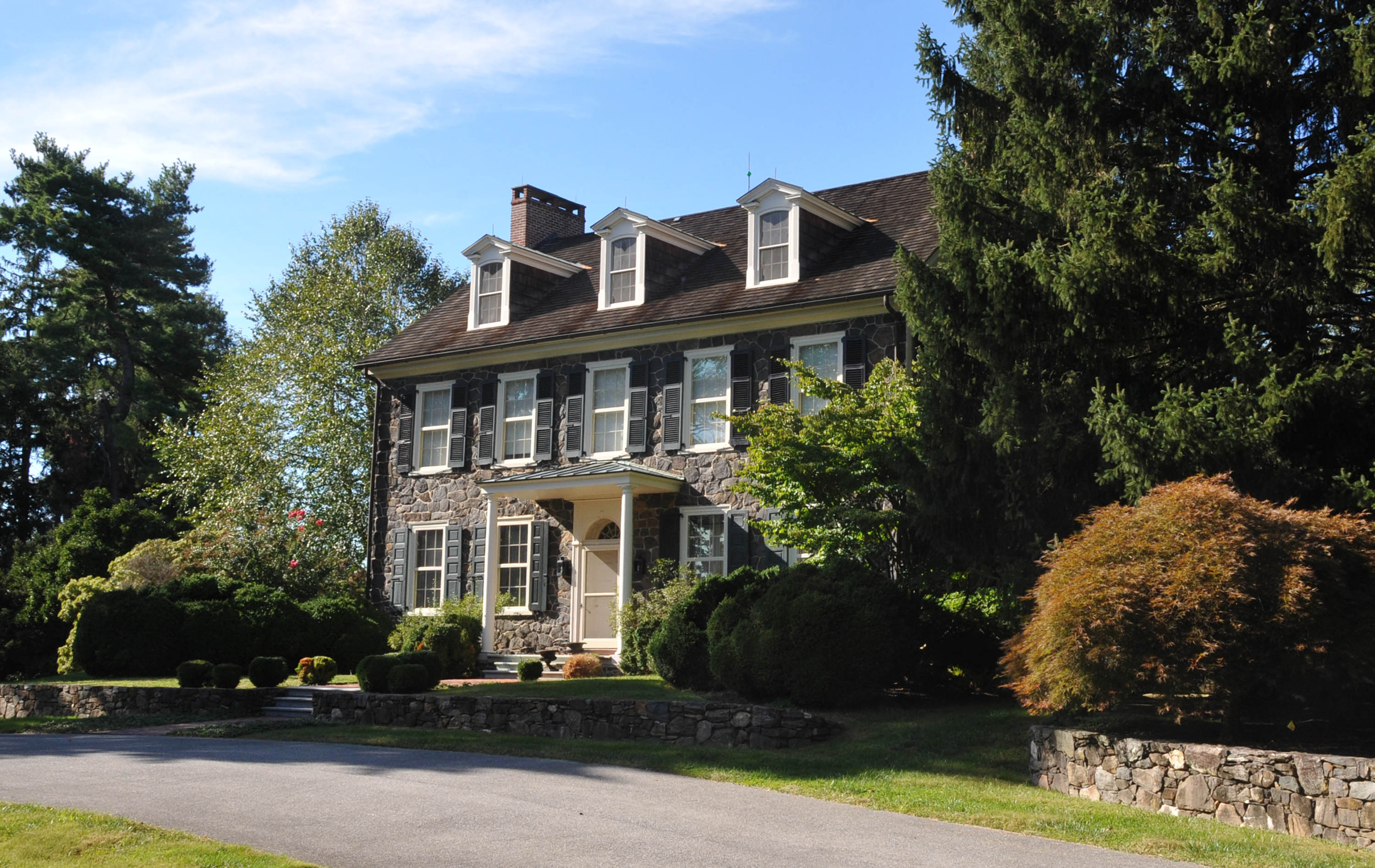
- George Brinton House, September 2012

- Location within Pennsylvania Location within the United States
- Location: PA 100, 1 mi. N of jct. with US 1, near Chadds Ford, Birmingham Township, Pennsylvania
- Coordinates: 39°52′51″N 75°35′56″W
- Area: 29.7 acres (12.0 ha)
- Built: 1777, c. 1830
- Architectural style: Federal
- NRHP reference No.: 90001608
- Added to NRHP: October 25, 1990

The George Brinton House, also known as Wawassan and Roundelay, is an historic home which is located in Birmingham Township, Chester County, Pennsylvania.

It was added to the National Register of Historic Places in 1990.

== History and architectural features ==
Built circa 1830, the George Brinton House is a two-and-one-half-story, five-bay, double pile, late Federal-style fieldstone dwelling with a gable roof. Also located on the property are a contributing carriage barn with stables, small carriage house, and the ruins of a large stone bank barn. During the Battle of Brandywine in September 1777, the property was the site where American gunners held an artillery position on high ground south of the house and exchanged fire with Hessian gunners across the Brandywine Creek.
