= Sharpless Homestead =

Historic house in Pennsylvania, United States

- U.S. National Register of Historic Places
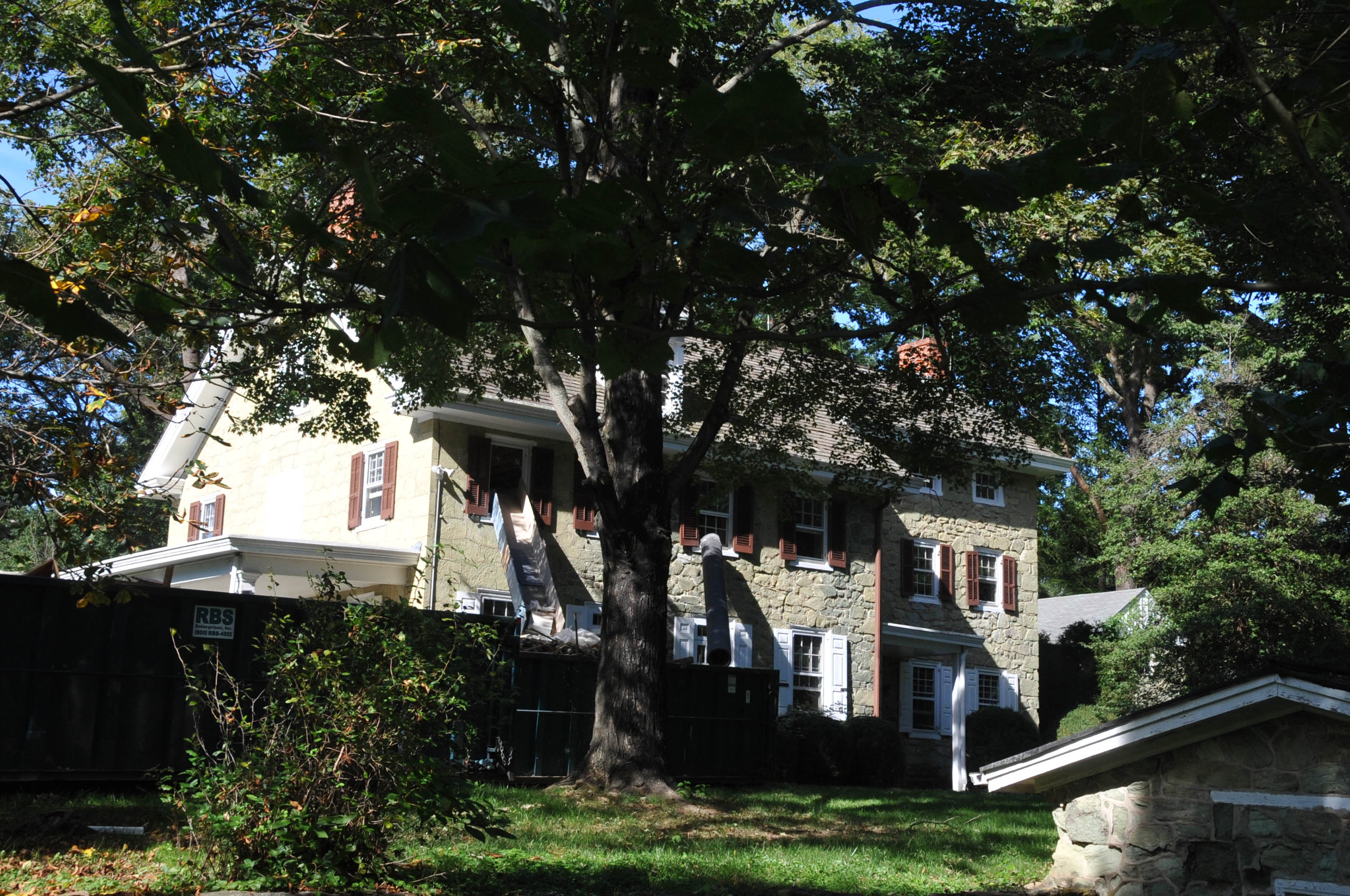

- Location within Pennsylvania Location within the United States
- Location: 1045 Birmingham Rd., Birmingham Township, Pennsylvania
- Coordinates: 39°55′08″N 75°36′22″W
- Area: 4.3 acres (1.7 ha)
- Built: c. 1790, 1820, 1831, 1860
- NRHP reference No.: 11000924
- Added to NRHP: December 15, 2011

The Sharpless Homestead, also known as the Radley Farm, is an historic home and farm complex that is located in Birmingham Township, Chester County, Pennsylvania, United States.

It was added to the National Register of Historic Places in 2011.

== History and architectural features ==
This historic house includes four green, serpentine, stone, vernacular buildings that were built roughly between 1790 and 1860. They are the farmhouse, stable, springhouse, and a smoke house. The main section of the farmhouse was built circa 1790 and rebuilt in 1860. It is a 2 1/2-story, four-bay, serpentine structure. The three-story, three-bay, east section was added circa 1820; the two-story northeast section was added circa 1831. It is the birthplace of Isaac Sharpless, professor and president of Haverford College.
