= Orthodox Meetinghouse =

Historic church in Pennsylvania, United States

- Birmingham Orthodox Friends Meetinghouse
- U.S. National Register of Historic Places
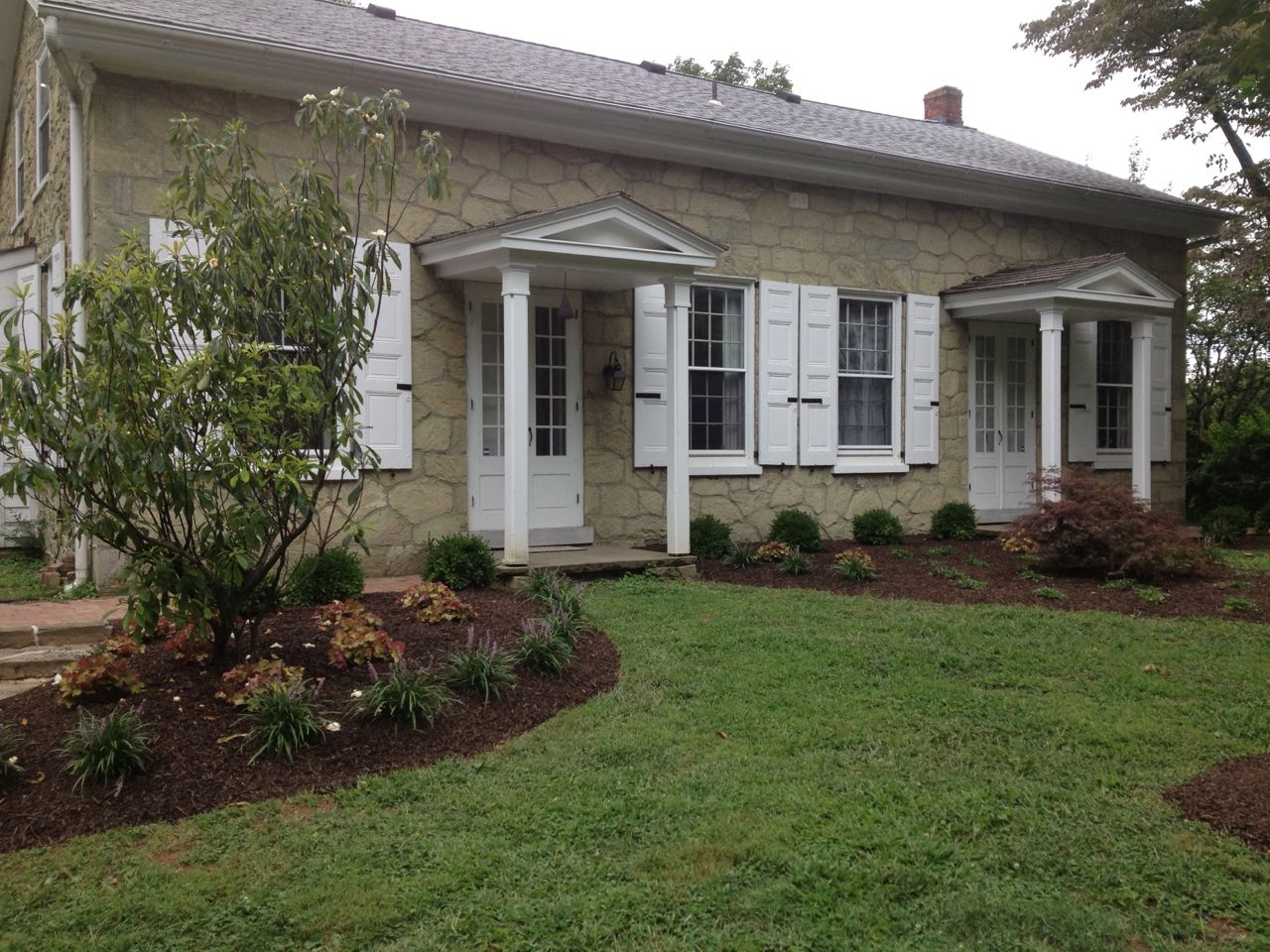
- Former Birmingham Orthodox Friends Meetinghouse in 2013

- Location within Pennsylvania Location within the United States
- Location: Southwest of West Chester on Birmingham Road, Birmingham Township, Chester County, Pennsylvania
- Coordinates: 39°54′16″N 75°35′38″W
- Area: 0.7 acres (0.28 ha)
- Built: 1845
- NRHP reference No.: 72001112
- Added to NRHP: April 26, 1972

The Birmingham Orthodox Friends Meeting, also known as the Birmingham Orthodox Meeting House, is an historic Quaker meetinghouse in Birmingham Township, Chester County, Pennsylvania, United States.

It was added to the National Register of Historic Places in 1972.

== History and architectural features ==
Erected in 1845, as a result of the Hicksite-Orthodox split in the Society of Friends, the Birmingham Orthodox Friends Meetinghouse was built in a modern or "classical" style, with larger windows than the older Birmingham Friends Meetinghouse. Created at a total cost of $2,310.83, it was built using green serpentine stone that was quarried at Chalkley Bell's Quarries in Westtown Township. It seated up to 200 people. A small graveyard was also built in 1874.

The members of the Birmingham Friends Meetinghouse, which was located a few hundred yards north, joined the Hicksite branch of the Quaker movement, as was common among farmers in Chester and Delaware Counties. That meetinghouse was the site of fighting during the Battle of Brandywine in 1777, and is listed separately on the National Register of Historic Places.

The two meetinghouses rejoined in 1923, well before the overall split healed in 1955. The Orthodox Meetinghouse was sold in 1938 for use as a private residence.
