= Edgewood (Birmingham Township, Chester County, Pennsylvania) =

Historic house in Pennsylvania, United States

- U.S. National Register of Historic Places
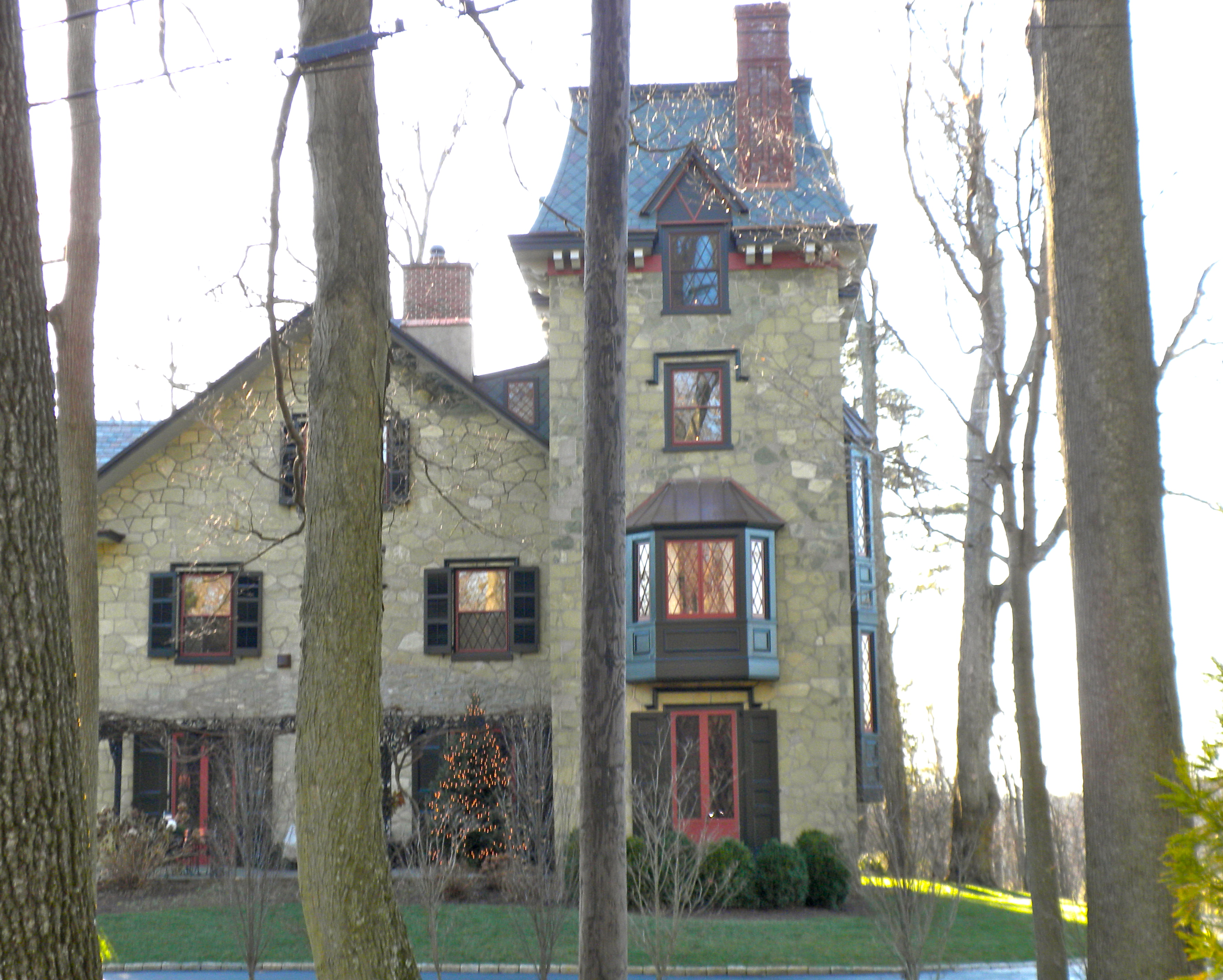
- Edgewood, December 2009

- Location within Pennsylvania Location within the United States
- Location: Southeast of the junction of County Roads 15087 and 15221, near West Chester, Birmingham Township, Pennsylvania
- Coordinates: 39°54′14″N 75°35′22″W
- Area: 9 acres (3.6 ha)
- Built: 1846
- Architectural style: Gothic
- NRHP reference No.: 09000102
- Added to NRHP: March 7, 1973

Edgewood, also known as the Charles Sharpless House, is a historic home located in Birmingham Township, Chester County, Pennsylvania. It was built about 1846, and is a 2 1/2-story, serpentine structure in the Victorian Gothic style. After 1873, it was remodeled and a four-story tower added.

It was added to the National Register of Historic Places in 1973.
