= Dilworthtown Historic District =

Historic district in Pennsylvania, United States

- U.S. National Register of Historic Places
- U.S. Historic district
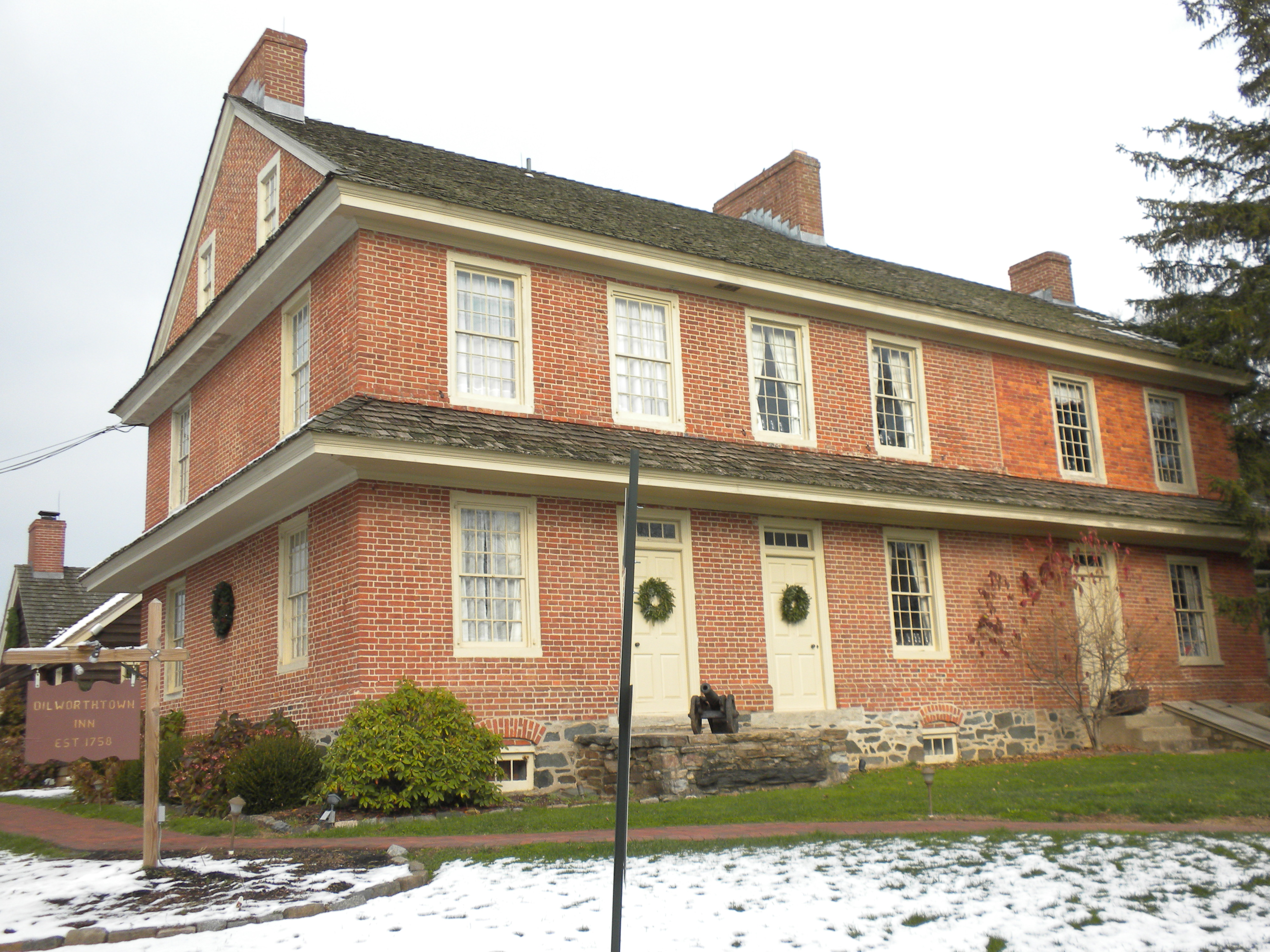
- Dilworthtown Inn, Dilworthtown Historic District, December 2009

- Location within Pennsylvania Location within the United States
- Location: Jct. of CR 15199 and 15087, Dilworthtown, Birmingham Township, Pennsylvania
- Coordinates: 39°53′57″N 75°34′06″W
- Area: 15 acres (6.1 ha)
- Built: c. 1700
- NRHP reference No.: 73001601
- Added to NRHP: January 18, 1973

Dilworthtown Historic District is a national historic district located in Dilworthtown, Birmingham Township, Chester County, Pennsylvania. It encompasses eight contributing buildings in the crossroads community of Dilworthtown. They include the Dilworth House (1758, 1770, c. 1800), stone house (1820), Dilworthtown Lyceum or meeting hall (c. 1850), Dilworthtown Store (1858), two tenant houses (c. 1850), and a two-story log cabin dated to 1686 or the early-18th century. The focal point of the district is the Dilworth House, also known as the Dilworthtown Inn, which has operated as an inn and tavern since the late 18th century. The town was at the center of the fighting during the Battle of Brandywine in September 1777.

It was added to the National Register of Historic Places in 1973.

The William Brinton 1704 House, a National Historic Landmark, is located about a half mile south of the historic district in Chadds Ford Township.
