= Birmingham Township, Chester County, Pennsylvania =

Township in Pennsylvania, US

Birmingham Township, Pennsylvania
- Township
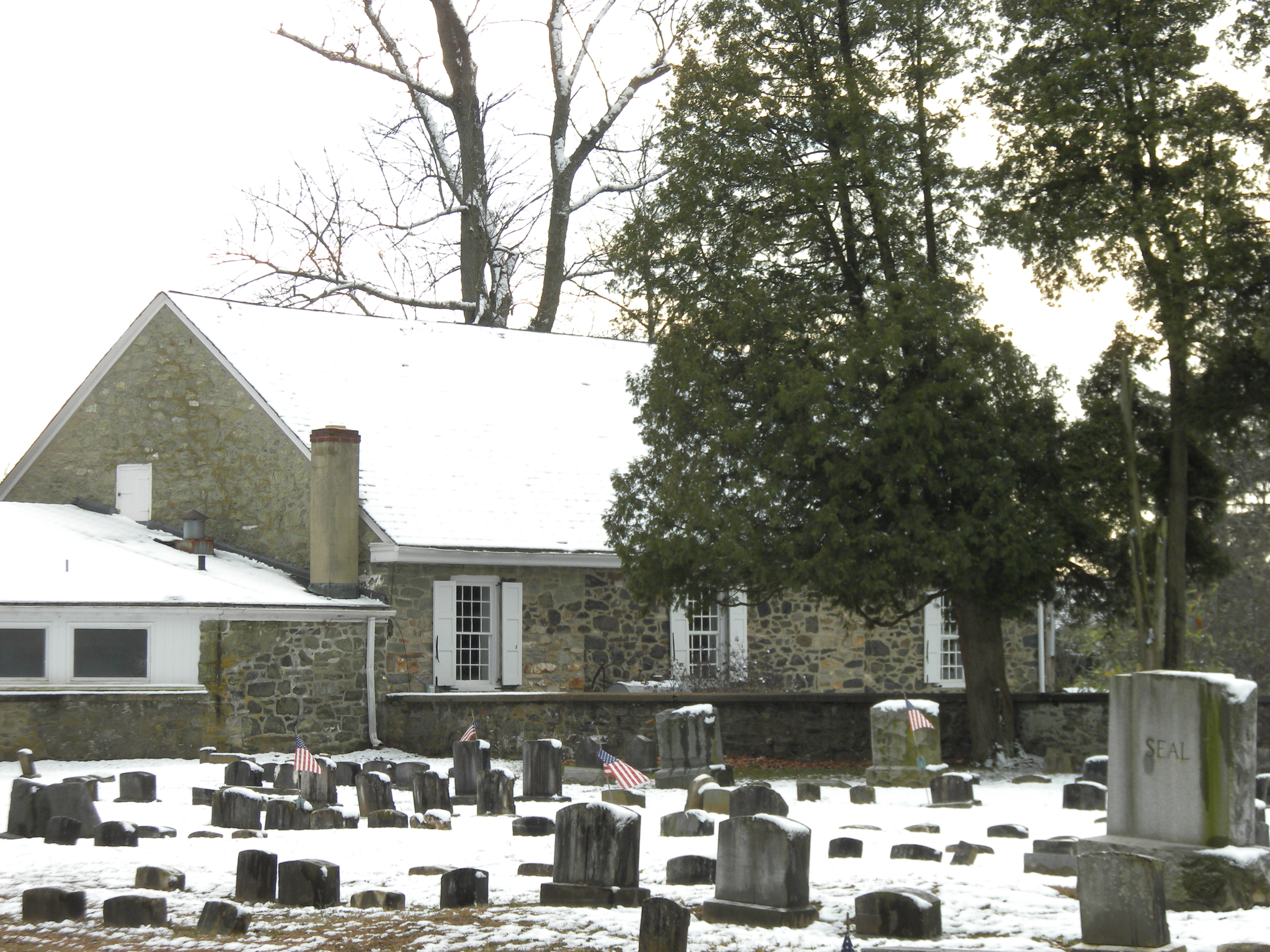
- Birmingham Friends Meeting

- Location of Birmingham Township in Chester County, Pennsylvania (left) and of Chester County in Pennsylvania (right)

- Location of Pennsylvania in the United States
- Coordinates: 39°54′30″N 75°36′55″W
- Country: United States
- State: Pennsylvania
- County: Chester

Area
  - Total: 6.43 sq mi (16.65 km^{2})
  - Land: 6.32 sq mi (16.38 km^{2})
  - Water: 0.11 sq mi (0.28 km^{2})
- Elevation: 249 ft (76 m)

Population (2020)
  - Total: 4,081 ▼
  - Estimate (2023): 4,086
  - Density: 672.1/sq mi (259.48/km^{2})
- Time zone: UTC-5 (EST)
  - Summer (DST): UTC-4 (EDT)
- Area code: 610
- FIPS code: 42-029-06544
- Website: www.birminghamtownship.org

Birmingham Township is a township in Chester County, Pennsylvania, United States. The population was 4,081 at the 2020 census.

== History ==
Birmingham Township was the site of the Battle of Brandywine, September 11, 1777, during the American Revolutionary War. Over 18,000 men were engaged. Until then, it was the largest land battle on the North American continent. Birmingham Friends Meeting, founded in 1690, is the location of a common grave of both American and British casualties. Much of the original battlefield around the meeting is preserved to this day. Birmingham is the oldest township in Chester County. Philadelphia magazine recently rated the township as one of the top five Best Places to Live in the suburbs of Philadelphia and as the "Place with the Biggest Paychecks".

The Lenape Bridge, Birmingham Friends Meetinghouse and School, Brinton's Mill, Edward Brinton House, George Brinton House, Daniel Davis House and Barn, Dilworthtown Historic District, Edgewood, Orthodox Meetinghouse, and Sharpless Homestead are listed on the National Register of Historic Places.

== Geography ==
According to the U.S. Census Bureau, the township has a total area of 6.5 square miles (17 km^{2}), of which 6.4 square miles (17 km^{2}) is land and 0.1 square miles (0.26 km^{2}), or 1.23%, is water. It is mainly composed of farmland and rolling hills, but several small communities also exist. A small non-contiguous piece of land within the great bend of Brandywine Creek is included in the township. It includes several roads, a railroad, and borders Chadds Ford Township in Delaware County, which until 1996 was also named Birmingham Township. Part of the census-designated place of Chadds Ford is in the southern corner of the township, extending south into Chadds Ford Township. Dilworthtown is in the eastern part of the township.

Adjacent townships

- Pennsbury Township, Chester County (southwest)
- Pocopson Township, Chester County (west)
- East Bradford Township, Chester County (north)
- Westtown Township, Chester County (northeast)
- Thornbury Township, Chester County (east)
- Chadds Ford Township, Delaware County (south)

The township has a humid subtropical climate (Cfa) and the hardiness zone is 7a except near the Brandywine Creek where it is 7b.

== Demographics ==
Historical population
Census	Pop.	Note	%±
1930	338		—
1940	384		13.6%
1950	429		11.7%
1960	453		5.6%
1970	834		84.1%
1980	1,584		89.9%
1990	2,636		66.4%
2000	4,221		60.1%
2010	4,208		−0.3%
2020	4,081		−3.0%
2023 (est.)	4,086		0.1%

At the 2010 census, the township was 90.6% non-Hispanic White, 1.4% Black or African American, 5.2% Asian, and 0.8% were two or more races. 2.1% of the population were of Hispanic or Latino ancestry.

At the 2000 census, there were 4,221 people in 1,391 households, including 1,265 families, in the township. The population density was 659.3 inhabitants per square mile (254.6/km^{2}). There were 1,413 housing units at an average density of 220.7 per square mile (85.2/km^{2}). The racial makeup of the township was 94.39% White, 0.57% African American, 0.05% Native American, 4.07% Asian, 0.05% Pacific Islander, 0.31% from other races, and 0.57% from two or more races. Hispanic or Latino of any race were 1.18%.

There were 1,391 households, 45.5% had children under the age of 18 living with them, 86.4% were married couples living together, 3.2% had a female householder with no husband present, and 9.0% were non-families. 7.4% of households were made up of individuals, and 1.1% were one person aged 65 or older. The average household size was 3.03 and the average family size was 3.19.

The age distribution was 30.1% under the age of 18, 4.1% from 18 to 24, 24.3% from 25 to 44, 34.5% from 45 to 64, and 6.9% 65 or older. The median age was 41 years. For every 100 females, there were 98.0 males. For every 100 females age 18 and over, there were 95.9 males.

The median household income was $130,096 and the median family income was $132,620. A 2006 study estimates the median household income at $152,516. Males had a median income of $99,678 versus $52,346 for females. The per capita income for the township was $51,756. About 0.4% of families and 0.9% of the population were below the poverty line, including none of those under the age of eighteen or sixty-five or over.

== Transportation ==
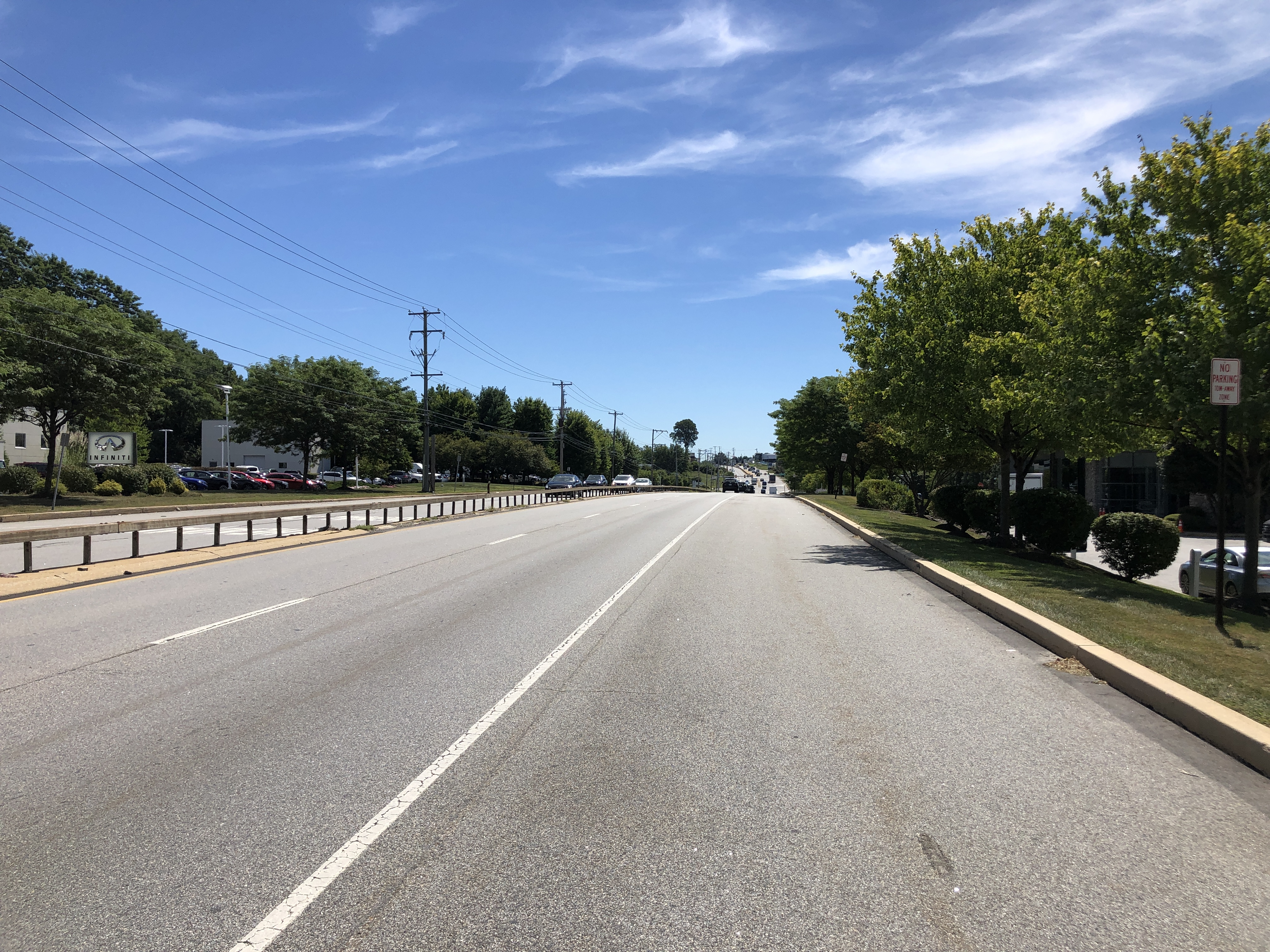
US Route 202 southbound and US Route 322 eastbound in Birmingham Township

As of 2020, there were 38.90 miles (62.60 km) of public roads in Birmingham Township, of which 13.50 miles (21.73 km) were maintained by Pennsylvania Department of Transportation (PennDOT) and 25.40 miles (40.88 km) were maintained by the township.

Numbered highways passing through Birmingham Township include U.S. Route 202/U.S. Route 322, Pennsylvania Route 52 and Pennsylvania Route 926. US 202 and US 322 follow the Wilmington Pike across the eastern edge of the township along a northwest–southeast alignment. PA 52 follows Lenape Road across the northwestern corner of the township on a north–south alignment. Finally, PA 926 follows Street Road across the central portion of the township on a southwest–northeast alignment.

== Schooling ==
Students in the area attend either Chadds Ford Elementary School or Pocopson Elementary School, followed by Charles F. Patton Middle School and Unionville High School, each of which are part of the Unionville-Chadds Ford School District. Private schools are also available nearby.
