= Isaac Sharpless =

American educator (1848-1920)

Isaac Sharpless, Sc.D., LL.D., L.H.D. (1848–1920) was an American educator, born in Chester County, Pennsylvania.

He graduated from Harvard in 1873 and received the honorary degree of Doctor of Divinity from there in 1915. He was employed at Haverford College for many years, becoming professor in 1879, dean in 1884, and president in 1887. In 1884, he was elected as a member of the American Philosophical Society.

His birthplace, the Sharpless Homestead, is listed on the National Register of Historic Places.

== Books ==
Astronomy for Schools and General Readers

Isaac Sharpless

- Astronomy for Schools and General Readers (1882; fifth edition, revised, 1912)
- English Education in the Elementary and Secondary Schools, in the "International Education Series" (1892)
- A Quaker Experiment in Government (1898)
- Two Centuries of Pennsylvania History (1900)
- Quakerism and Politics (1905)
- The Quaker Boy on the Farm and At School (1908)
- The American College (1915)
