= John Lester =

American cricketer (1871–1969)

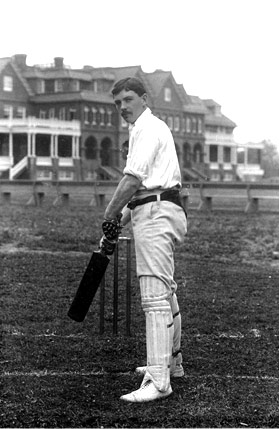
- Lester in around 1897

Personal information
- Full name: John Ashby Lester
- Born: August 1, 1871; Penrith, Cumberland, England
- Died: September 3, 1969 (aged 98); Haverford, Pennsylvania, US
- Batting: Right-handed
- Bowling: Right-arm slow

Domestic team information
- Years: Team
- 1894–1906: Merion
- 1896–1908: Gentlemen of Philadelphia

Career statistics
Competition	First-class
Matches	47
Runs scored	2,552
Batting average	33.14
100s/50s	2/18
Top score	126*
Balls bowled	2,314
Wickets	57
Bowling average	22.22
5 wickets in innings	3
10 wickets in match	1
Best bowling	7/31
Catches/stumpings	15/–
- Source: CricInfo, September 28 2018

John Ashby Lester (August 1, 1871 – September 3, 1969) was an American cricketer, active in the late 19th and early 20th centuries, and a teacher. Lester was one of the Philadelphian cricketers who played from the end of the 19th century until the outbreak of World War I. His obituary in Wisden Cricketers' Almanack, described him as "one of the great figures in American cricket." During his career, he played in 53 matches for the Philadelphians, 47 of which are considered first class. From 1897 until his retirement in 1908, Lester led the batting averages in Philadelphia and captained all the international home matches.

== Early life and career ==
Lester was born in Penrith in Cumberland, England on August 1, 1871. He began playing cricket at a very young age. He was playing a game in Yorkshire in 1892 when he met Dr. Isaac Sharpless. Sharpless was the president of Haverford College, and invited him to the United States to attend the school. In his early days as a student in Cumberland's Ackworth School, he had been described as a "very indifferent batsman". It was only after entering Haverford that he developed his batting style. As a student at Haverford, Lester excelled as an athlete and a scholar and played football, track, tennis, and soccer. During his freshman year, he averaged 100.5 runs per innings. Lester also won the Cope Bat every year during his time at Haverford. In his final season with the school in 1896, he scored 1,185 total runs and took 40 wickets for averages of 79 and 23.2, respectively. He also captained Haverford on their first overseas tour, scoring 105 against the MCC on his first appearance at Lord's. On this tour, he created a great impression with an average of over 84 and prepared himself for the Philadelphian's tour of England the following year.

=== Tour of England in 1897 ===
The tour undertaken by the Philadelphian cricketers was very ambitious. Though the results might have been less satisfactory than hoped for by its promoters, the tour was arranged mainly for educational purposes and few of those on the American side expected to win many matches. Previous tours had tended to involve amateur English sides as opponents, with a low level of competition. In 1897 a schedule was prepared including all of the top county cricket teams, the Oxford and Cambridge University teams, the Marylebone Cricket Club, and two other sides, though only a few of the counties thought it worthwhile to put their best elevens onto the field. Starting on June 7 at Oxford, the tour lasted for two months and ended in late July at The Oval. While it initially aroused some curiosity, many English fans lost interest until John Lester and the Philadelphians met the full Sussex team at Brighton on June 17. Behind a dominant bowling performance by Bart King, Lester helped to seal the victory with his batting. In the first innings, Lester and King were partners in a fourth-wicket stand of 107, with Lester top-scoring with 92. He continued in the second innings with 34 not out.

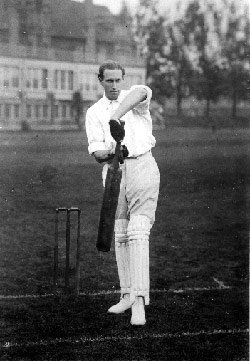
Bart King partnered Lester in a stand of 107 against Sussex in 1897

Despite the excitement surrounding Lester's and King's performances, the Americans did not fare well overall. Fifteen matches were played, but only two were won, while the team lost nine and earned a draw in four. The other win came against Warwickshire. During this match at Edgbaston, Lester scored 35 runs in the first innings and 67 in the second. Lester was the best batsman on the Philadelphian side; beginning with 72 not out in his first match, he kept up his form all through the tour, scoring 891 runs for an average 37.12. Several counties offered him contracts to play in England.

=== Tours of England in 1903 and 1908 ===
John Lester was chosen to captain the Philadelphians in 1903 and 1908 on their tours to England. Against Leicestershire in August 1903, Lester made his highest score in first-class cricket. In the first innings, he made 126 not out, and this was followed by a respectable 64 in the second innings. His batting on this tour so impressed the critics that he was called the "one batsman (among the Philadelphians) who may almost (be) described as great" and that he "would soon be one of the greatest men of his day" In his last first-class match on the 1908 tour, Lester posted a score of 34 in the first innings, but was dismissed LBW for nought in the second innings. He did manage to take 4 wickets in the Philadelphians' loss to Kent.

== Legacy and later life ==
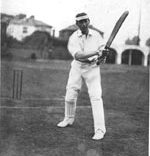
John Lester posing at bat in later life

John Lester helped to lift Philadelphia cricket to the highest levels of international play with his leadership and understanding of the sport. He is one of the few American cricketers noted in Cricket Scores and Biographies, which said that he was "a watchful batsman who could hit well and had plenty of strokes and strong defence." In 1951 he authored A Century of Philadelphia Cricket, which was a definitive history of the game in the area. Lester was also integral in the foundation of the C.C. Morris Cricket Library when he proposed in 1964 that cricket, "with a history and literature second to none should be given a permanent home in the United States." In 1969, he made his final public appearance at a cricket function when the library was opened at Haverford. Lester received his PhD in education from Harvard University in 1902 and for many years was head of the English department at The Hill School in Pottstown, Pennsylvania and served as a university professor. He died in 1969 and as a lasting memorial, the pavilion at Cope Field is named in his honor at Haverford College.

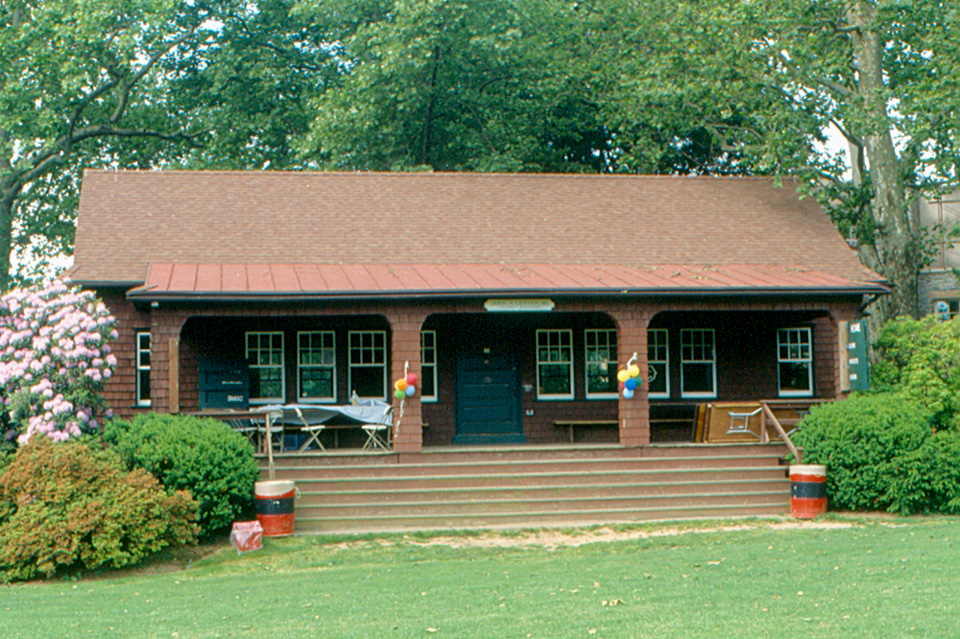
John Ashby Lester Cricket Pavilion next to Cope's Field Cricket Pitch, which has a library with the Western Hemisphere's largest collection of cricket literature and memorabilia.

== Teams ==
=== International ===
- United States of America (in two non-first-class matches against Canada, one in 1901 and one in 1906)

=== USA first-class ===
- Philadelphia

=== Philadelphia club ===
- Merion

== Publications ==
- Essays of Yesterday and Today. New York: Harcourt, Brace and Company, 1943.
- A Century of Philadelphia Cricket. Philadelphia: University of Pennsylvania Press, 1951.
