= Asa Walton House =

Historic house in Pennsylvania, United States

- U.S. National Register of Historic Places
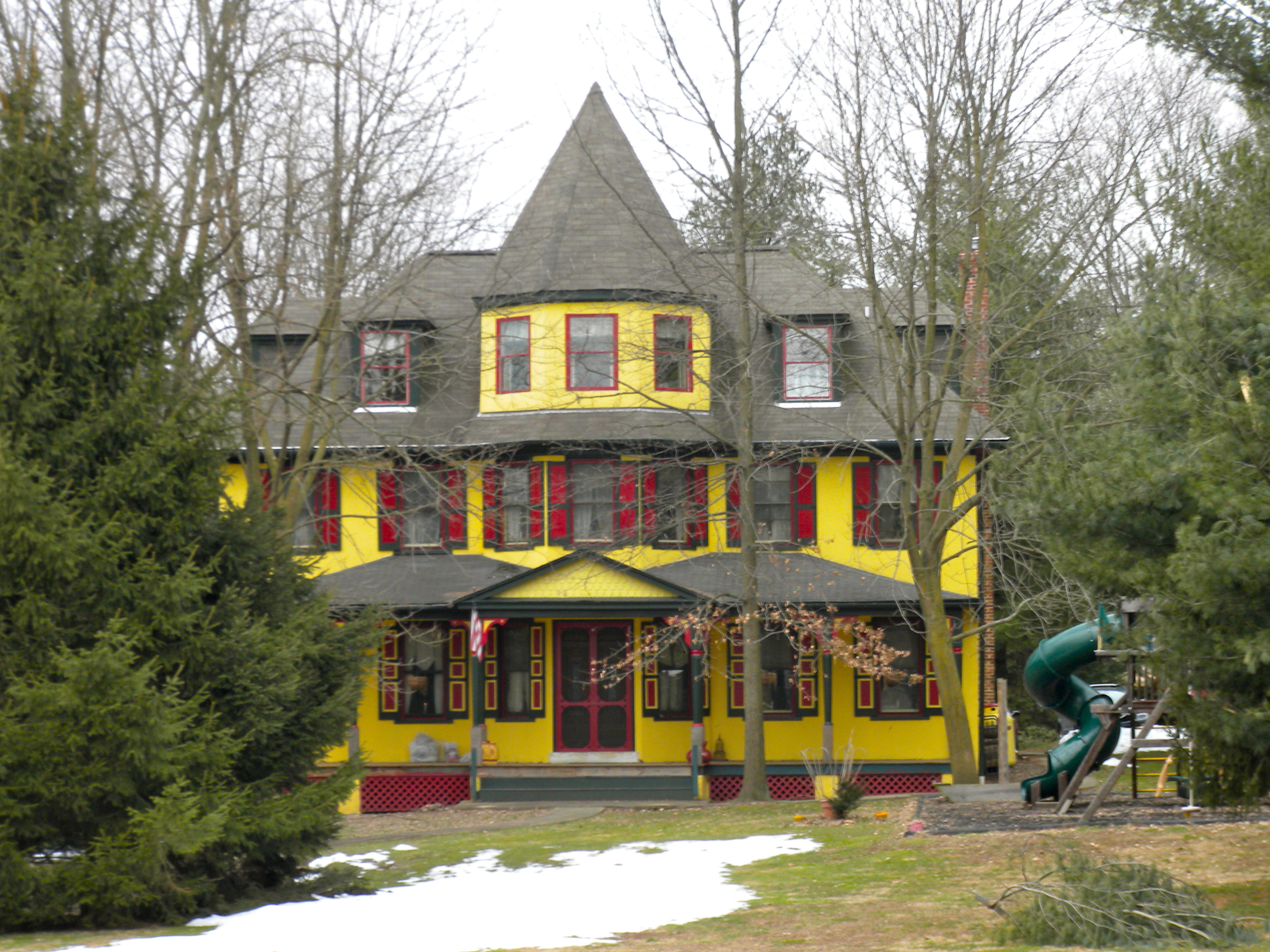
- Asa Walton House, March 2010

- Location within Pennsylvania Location within the United States
- Location: Strasburg and Old Wilmington Rds. near Coatesville, East Fallowfield Township, Pennsylvania
- Coordinates: 39°57′20″N 75°51′16″W
- Area: 1 acre (0.40 ha)
- Built: c. 1810, c. 1900
- Architectural style: Queen Anne
- MPS: Strasburg Road TR;East Fallowfield Township MRA
- NRHP reference No.: 85002396
- Added to NRHP: September 18, 1985

Asa Walton House is a historic home located in East Fallowfield Township, Chester County, Pennsylvania. It was originally built about 1810 and rebuilt about 1900 in the Queen Anne style. It is a 2 1/2-story, seven-bay, stuccoed stone dwelling with a slate covered multi-gabled roof. It features a massive conical three-story turret and full width verandah with ornate balustrades and brackets. It was renovated to its present form by the DeHaven Brothers, who also built the Harry DeHaven House and Isaac Pawling House.

It was added to the National Register of Historic Places in 1985.
