= Isaac Pawling House =

Historic house in Pennsylvania, United States

- U.S. National Register of Historic Places
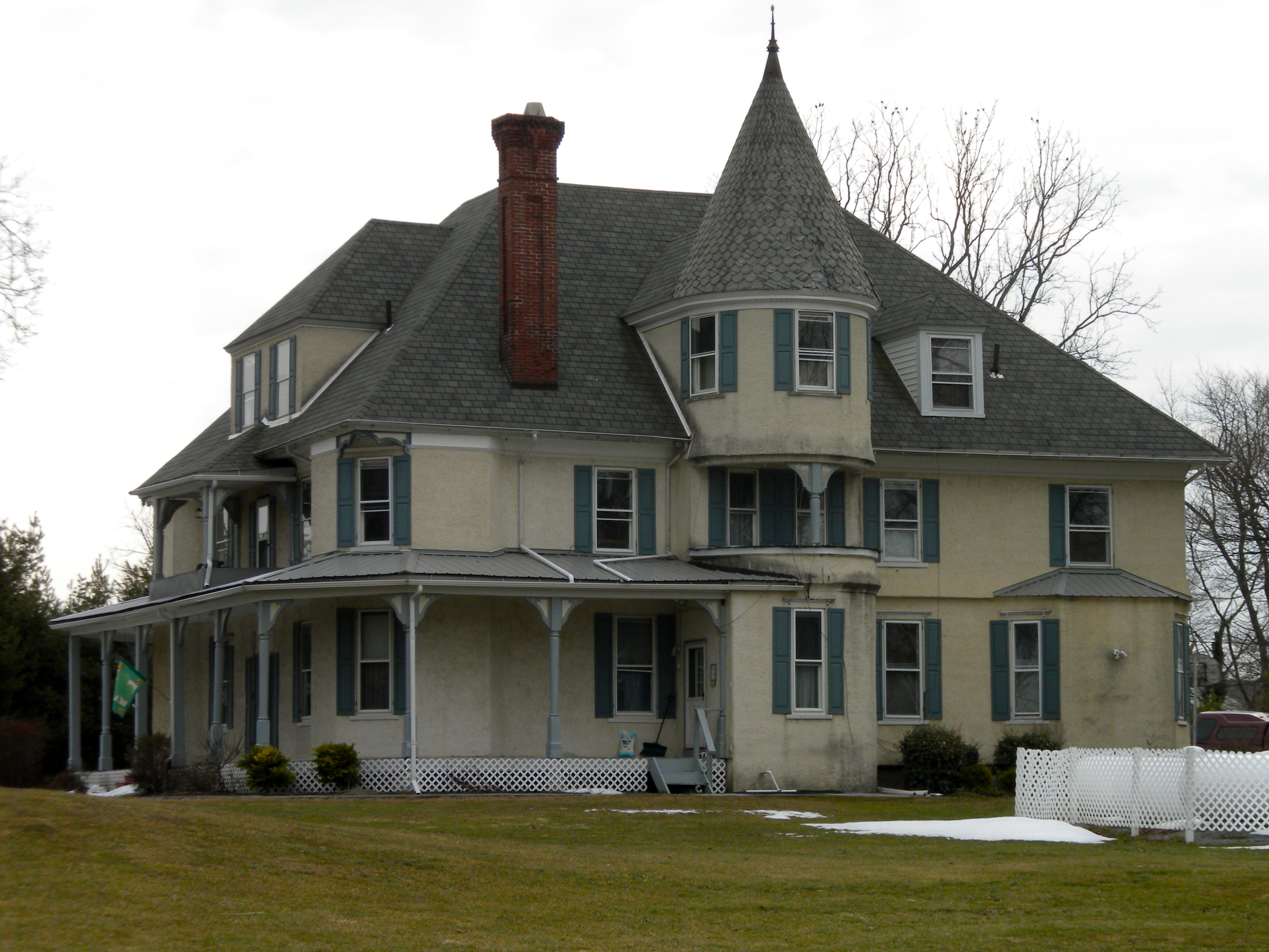
- Isaac Pawling House, March 2010

- Location within Pennsylvania Location within the United States
- Location: Strasburg Road near Coatesville, East Fallowfield Township, Pennsylvania
- Coordinates: 39°57′18″N 75°50′53″W
- Area: 1 acre (0.40 ha)
- Built: c. 1900
- Built by: DeHaven, William
- Architectural style: Queen Anne
- MPS: Strasburg Road TR;East Fallowfield Township MRA
- NRHP reference No.: 85002394
- Added to NRHP: September 18, 1985

The Isaac Pawling House is an historic home which is located in East Fallowfield Township, Chester County, Pennsylvania.

It was added to the National Register of Historic Places in 1985.

== History and architectural features ==
Built circa 1900, this historic structure is a two-story, seven-bay, frame dwelling with a slate-covered hipped roof which was designed in the Queen Anne style. It features a large, steep, conical turret, two-story, bay window, and two-story hipped roof portico porch. Its builder also built the Harry DeHaven House across the street.
