= Harry DeHaven House =

Historic house in Pennsylvania, United States

- U.S. National Register of Historic Places
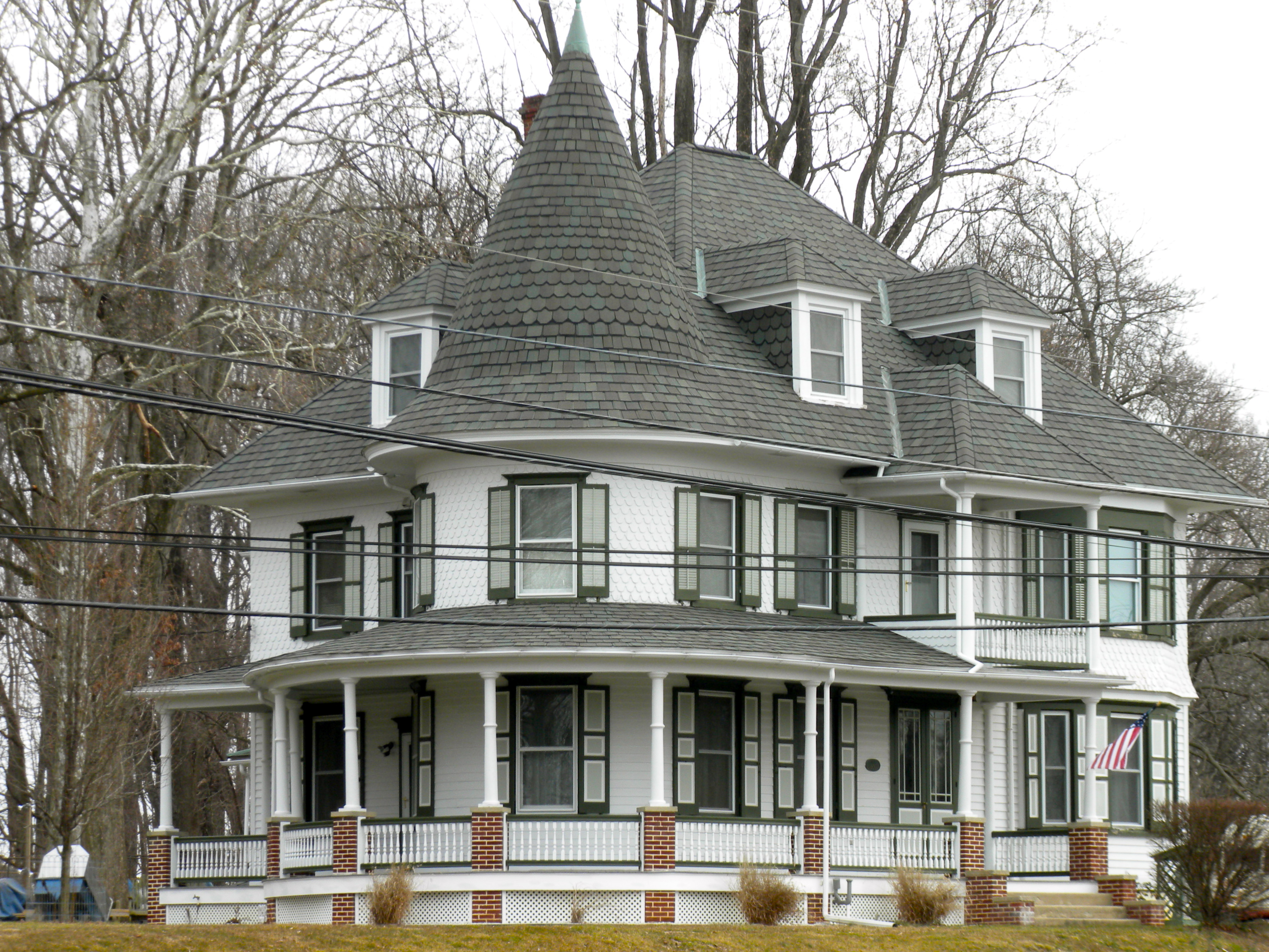
- Harry DeHaven House, March 2010

- Location within Pennsylvania Location within the United States
- Location: Strasburg Road near Coatesville, East Fallowfield Township, Pennsylvania
- Coordinates: 39°57′21″N 75°50′53″W
- Area: 1.2 acres (0.49 ha)
- Built: c. 1900
- Built by: DeHaven, Harry
- Architectural style: Queen Anne
- MPS: Strasburg Road TR;East Fallowfield Township MRA
- NRHP reference No.: 85002386
- Added to NRHP: September 18, 1985

The Harry DeHaven House is an historic home that is located in East Fallowfield Township, Chester County, Pennsylvania, United States.

It was added to the National Register of Historic Places in 1985.

== History and architectural features ==
Built circa 1900, this historic structure is a five-story, five-bay, frame dwelling that was designed in the Queen Anne style. It features tall Jacobean chimneys, a wraparound porch on three sides, rounded corners, and a partial porch on the second story. Its builder also built the Isaac Pawling House across the street.
