= Woodland Cemetery (Des Moines, Iowa) =

Cemetery in Des Moines, Iowa

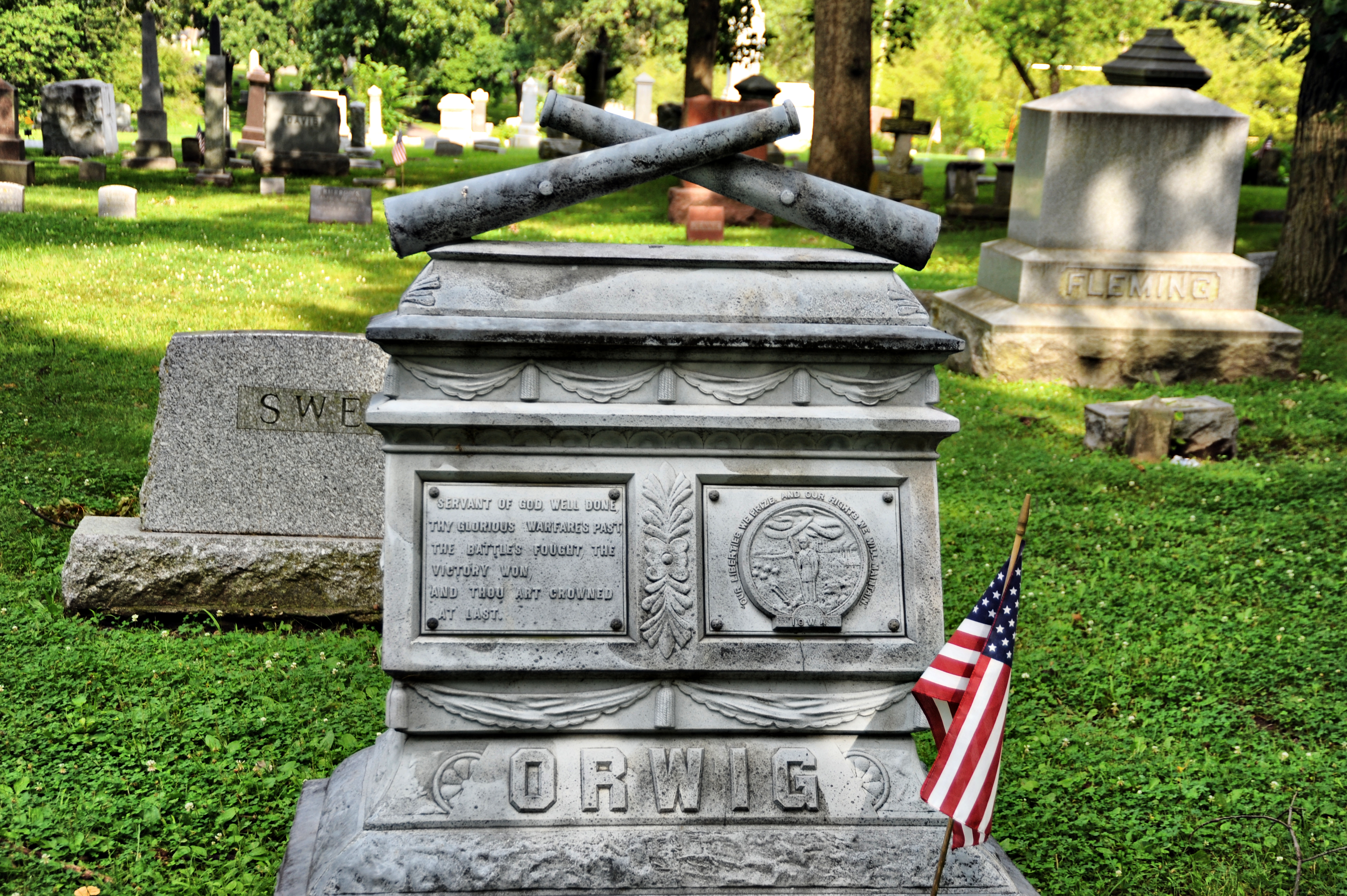
- Interactive map of Woodland Cemetery

Details
- Established: 1848
- Location: 2019 Woodland Avenue, Des Moines, Iowa
- Country: United States
- Coordinates: 41.589486°N 93.648094°W
- Type: Municipal
- Size: 69 acres (28 ha)
- Find a Grave: Woodland Cemetery

Woodland Cemetery is the oldest cemetery in Des Moines, Iowa, having been established in 1848, before Des Moines was the state capital. It is a municipal cemetery owned and operated by the Des Moines Parks and Recreation Department. It covers 69 acres (28 ha) at the corner of 20th Street and Woodland Ave and is the site of over 80,000 graves.

== History ==
The cemetery was created in 1848 when five local farmers donated 5.5 acres (2.2 ha) of land to create it. It was originally called Fort Des Moines Cemetery. The first burial took place in 1850, the burial of Thomas Casady, the infant son of Iowa state senator Phineas M. Casady. The city took ownership of the cemetery in 1857, and purchased an additional 36.5 acres in 1864. It has since been expanded to 69 acres (28 ha) and now houses over 80,000 graves. The City Receiving Vault, which was used to store bodies when the ground was too frozen for graves to be dug, was built in the 1880s.

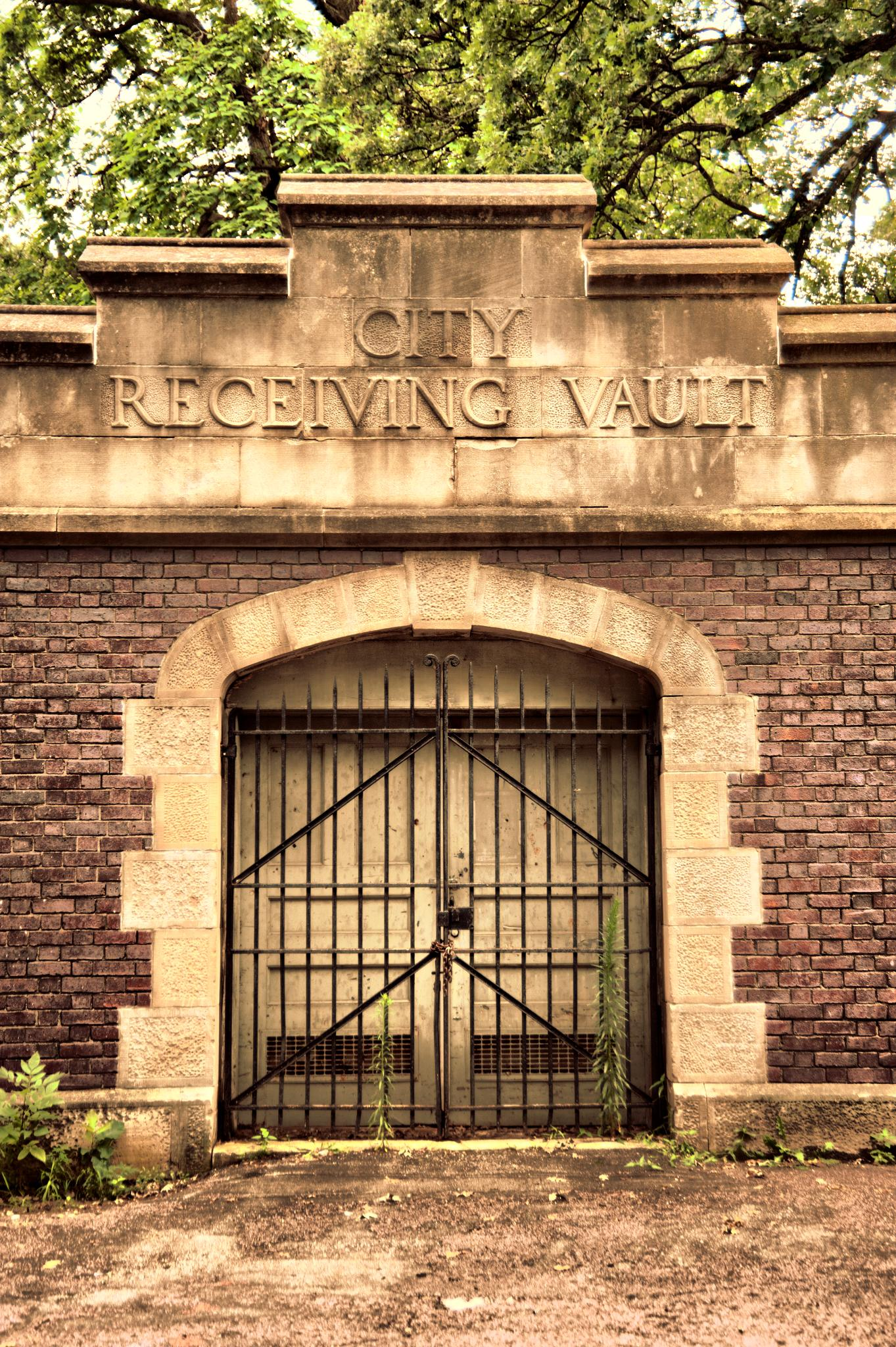
City Receiving Vault

Within the grounds are subsections. These include St. Ambrose Cemetery (relocated from elsewhere in Des Moines in 1866), the Emmanuel Jewish Cemetery founded in 1871, and an Independent Order of Odd Fellows Cemetery.

In 1986, the city council of Des Moines designated the cemetery a local historic landmark. Various restoration projects have been undertaken in recent years. A new arch over the entrance was constructed in 2012. An effort to restore the mausoleum of Samuel Merrill, the seventh governor of Iowa was started. A project to add markers to hundreds of previously unmarked children's graves on "Baby Hill" from the earliest days of the cemetery concluded successfully in April 2017.

A number of historic neighborhoods are near the cemetery, including Sherman Hill to the east, Woodland Place to the west, Ingersoll Place to the southwest.

== Notable interments ==
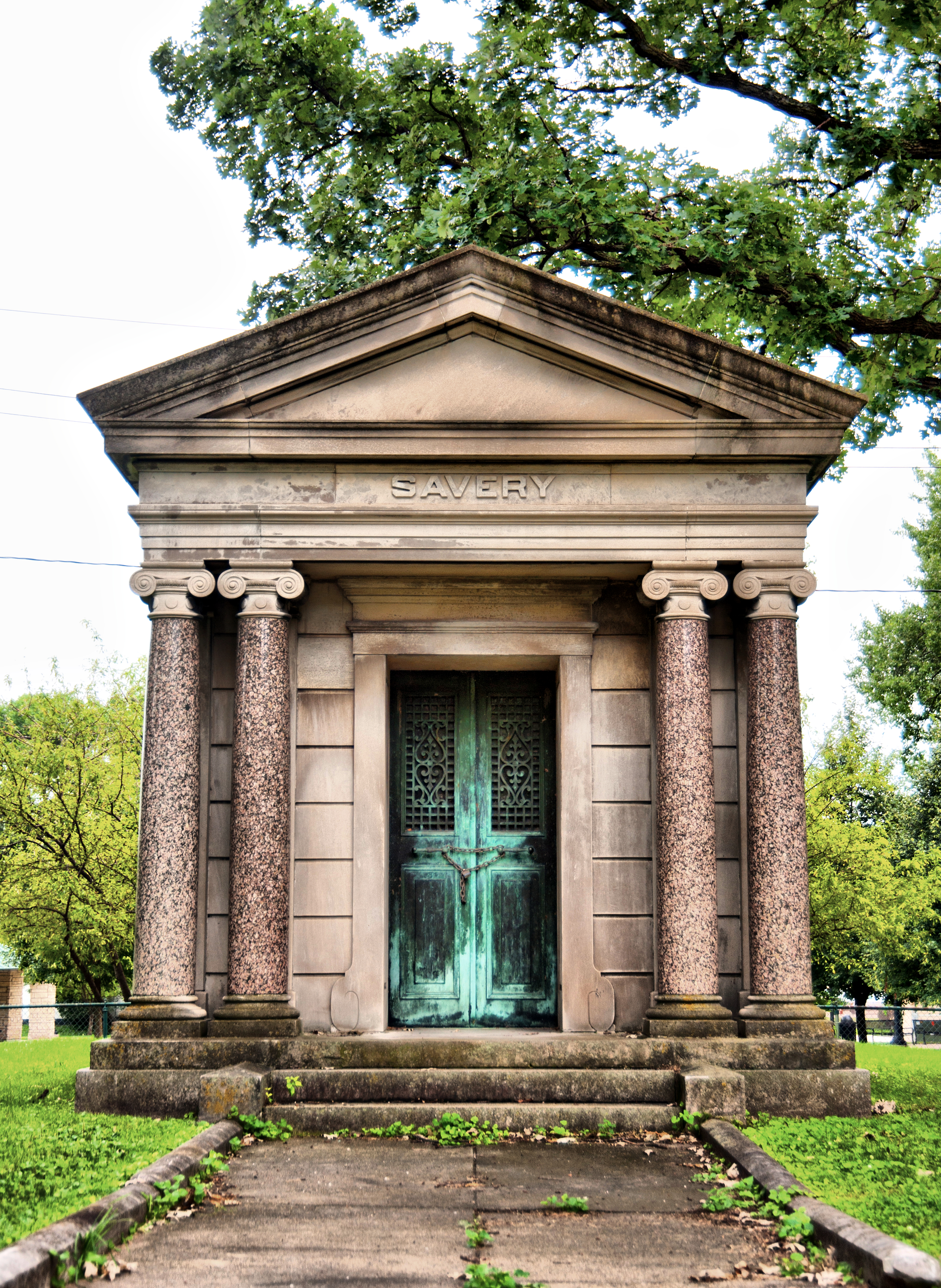
Savery Mausoleum

- Rollin V. Ankeny (1830 – 1901), soldier
- Nathaniel B. Baker (1818 – 1876), 24th governor of New Hampshire
- Martha Callanan, (1826 – 1901), woman's suffrage advocate, newspaper publisher
- James S. Clarkson (1842–1918), Iowa Republican leader and newspaper editor
- Chester C. Cole, Chief Justice of the Iowa Supreme Court
- Rose Connor (1892 – 1970), architect
- Ira Cook (1821 – 1902), land surveyor, businessman, politician
- Marcellus M. Crocker (1830 – 1865), American Civil War general
- Albert B. Cummins (1850 – 1926), 18th governor of Iowa
- Ida L. Cummins (1853 – 1918) Women's and children's rights activist
- Alvah Frisbie (1830 – 1917), Pioneer minister
- Josiah Given (1828 – 1908) attorney, soldier and Iowa Supreme Court justice
- Cora Bussey Hillis (1858 – 1924) child welfare advocate
- Frederick Marion Hubbell (1839 – 1930), prominent Des Moines businessman
- John A. Kasson (1822 – 1910), politician
- John MacVicar (1859 – 1928), progressive mayor of Des Moines (elected 1896, 1898, 1900 and 1928)
- Samuel Merrill (1822 – 1899), 7th governor of Iowa
- Calista Halsey Patchin (1845 – 1920), first woman reporter for the Washington Post
- Emory Jenison Pike (1876 – 1918), a World War I recipient of the Medal of Honor
- Charles A. Rawson (1867 – 1936), unelected Senator for Iowa in 1922
- Annie Nowlin Savery (1831 – 1891), women's suffrage activist and philanthropist
- James C. Savery (1826 – 1905) businessman who built the Savery Hotel
- Hoyt Sherman (1827 – 1904), banker, namesake of Hoyt Sherman Place, brother of William T. Sherman
- Hiram Y. Smith (1843 – 1894), politician
- Seward Smith (1830 – 1887), lawyer, politician
- Sumner F. Spofford, one of the first mayors of Des Moines
- S. S. Still (1851 – 1931), osteopath
- James M. Tuttle (1823 – 1892), soldier
- Henry Cantwell Wallace (1866 – 1924), politician
- James B. Weaver (1833 – 1912), politician
- George G. Wright (1820 – 1896), politician
- Lafayette Young (1848 – 1926), journalist
- Sarah Palmer Young (1830 – 1908), nurse and writer
