= Calista Halsey Patchin =

American journalist (1845–1920)

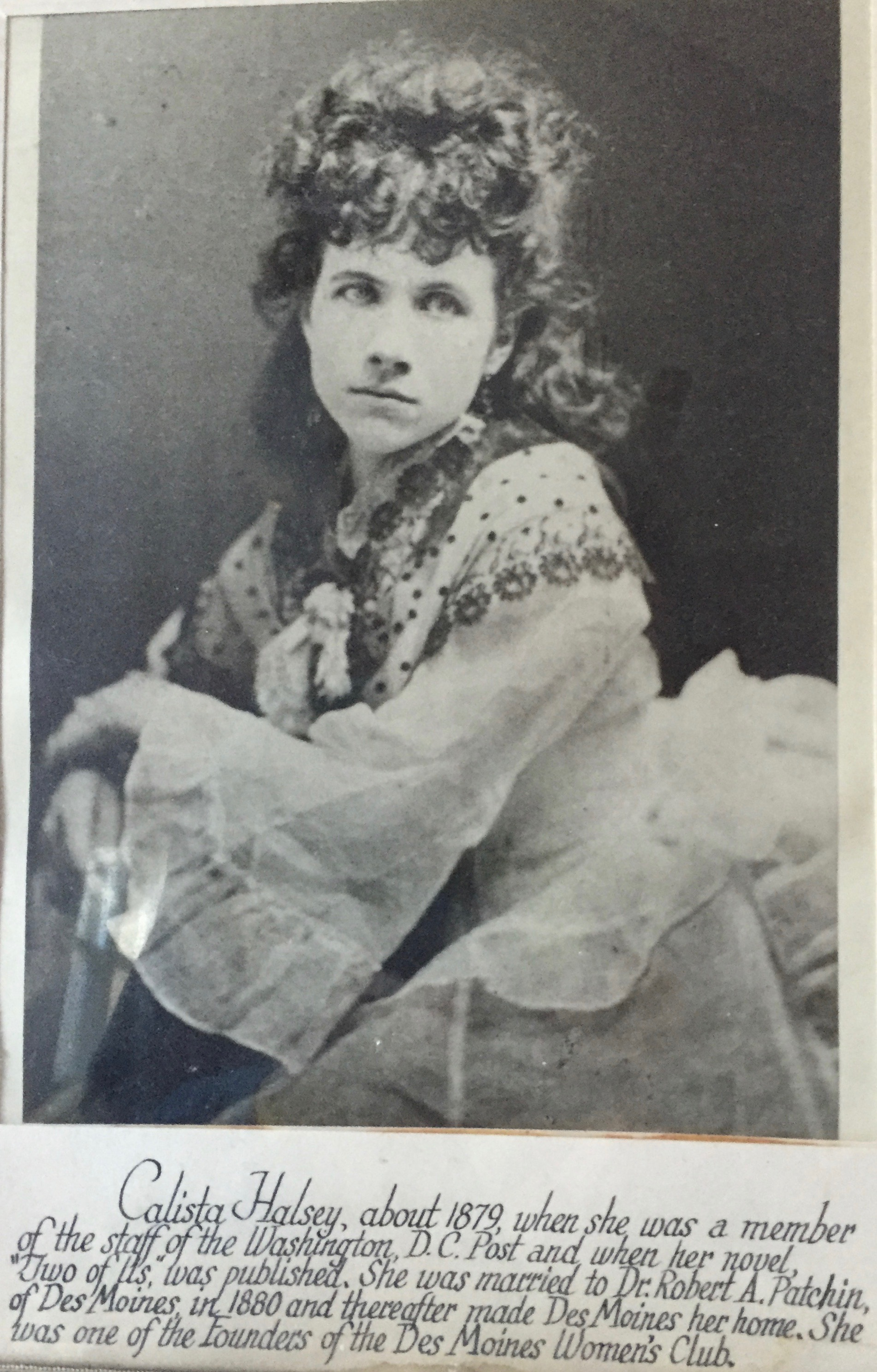
- Calista Halsey Patchin
- Born: Calista Halsey; December 2, 1845; Chillicothe, Ohio, U.S.
- Died: January 5, 1920 (aged 74); Loomis, New York, U.S.
- Resting place: Woodland Cemetery, Des Moines, IA
- Known for: Journalist; Washington Post; Author

Calista Halsey Patchin (December 2, 1845 – January 5, 1920) was a journalist and artist based in Washington, D.C., and Des Moines, Iowa. Patchin was the first woman reporter hired by The Washington Post newspaper in 1878.

== Early life ==
She was born on December 2, 1845, in Chillicothe, Ohio. She was the daughter of Samuel Halsey, a newspaper man. Patchin was educated in Ohio and Albany, New York. She studied wood carving at the Cincinnati School of Design. She taught woodworking in St. Louis, Missouri. She began her career as a journalist covering the Mardi Gras and writing articles for many newspapers. Soon after, she was hired in 1878 by The Washington Post newspaper to become their first woman reporter. She was described as a lively writer and was assigned to "women's news." "On the Post, she was in no sense limited to articles, supposedly appealing especially to women. She wrote editorials, reported notable public events, interviewed statesmen, author, actors, and actresses, painters, etc." In 2018, as part of its 141 anniversary, an illustrated graphic strip of her life was published in the Post.

Before her marriage, she wrote a novel called Two of Us, about two young women who were wood artists. She also wrote several short stories. One, "The Professor", is included in Prairie Gold, a collection of writings by Iowa authors.

Her wedding announcement states: "Miss Calista Halsey well known in literary circles and elsewhere, is to be married at her Ohio home shortly to a young physician of large practice and most excellent promise in Des Moines, Iowa, in which city she will hereafter reside. As the author of the very clever little book entitled "Two of Us." And also as a contributor to magazines and the daily press, Miss H. Has won the reputation of a bright and earnest worker, who bade fair to give the world literary contributions of permanent value."

== Life in Des Moines ==
Following her marriage in 1880 to Robert Azor Patchin, she moved to Des Moines with her husband and devoted herself to developing arts and culture in Des Moines. She was the primary mover in developing the art collection of the Des Moines Women's Club instructing members in fine arts and helping with the interior decorating of the clubhouse. This collection became the first public art collection in the city. The club built a gallery room in the club house, Hoyt Sherman Place. The gallery room made the collection available for public viewing. Patchin wrote: "no other women's club in this country achieved such success in 'upbuilding' of its art holdings."

Patchin was a charter member of the Des Moines Women's Club. She delivered the first paper "Art and Literature", heard by the club on November 10, 1885. Later that year, she prepared a second paper read March 2, 1886, titled "Aesop and his Fables". (cite Day and Memorabilia)

She was a member of the Iowa Press and Authors Club and a pioneer of Des Moines. She died in Loomis, New York, January 5, 1920, and her body was returned to Des Moines to be buried with her husband. Her living relatives were her two sons, Robert H and Ira H Patchin of New York City, her son Philip H. of San Francisco, and her sister, Alice Halsey.
