= Emory Jenison Pike =

United States Army officer (1876–1918)

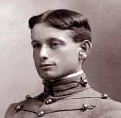
- At West Point in 1901
- Born: December 18, 1876; Columbus City, Iowa
- Died: September 16, 1918 (aged 41); Vandieres, France
- Burial place: Woodland Cemetery, Des Moines, Iowa
- Relatives: Zebulon Pike (great-granduncle)
- Military career
- Allegiance: United States of America
- Branch: United States Army
- Service years: 1901–1918
- Rank: Lieutenant Colonel
- Unit: 82nd Division
- Commands: 321st Machine Gun Battalion
- Conflicts: World War I
- Awards: Medal of Honor

Signature
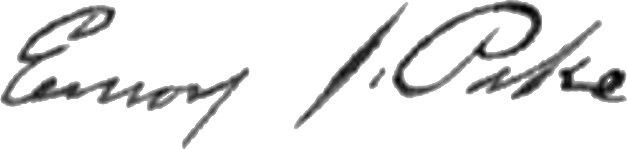

Emory Jenison Pike (December 18, 1876 – September 16, 1918) was a United States Army officer during World War I who received the Medal of Honor for his actions at Vandieres, France on September 15, 1918. A 1901 graduate of West Point, and the only West Point graduate to be awarded the Medal of Honor during World War I, Pike was a lieutenant colonel at Vandieres. His daughter was presented his Medal of Honor after the war. He was buried at Woodland Cemetery, Des Moines, Iowa. He was the great-grandnephew of explorer Zebulon Pike.

== Medal of Honor citation ==
Citation:

Having gone forward to reconnoiter new machinegun positions, Lt. Col. Pike offered his assistance in reorganizing advance infantry units which had become disorganized during a heavy artillery shelling. He succeeded in locating only about 20 men, but with these he advanced and when later joined by several infantry platoons rendered inestimable service in establishing outposts, encouraging all by his cheeriness, in spite of the extreme danger of the situation. When a shell had wounded one of the men in the outpost, Lt. Col. Pike immediately went to his aid and was severely wounded himself when another shell burst in the same place. While waiting to be brought to the rear, Lt. Col. Pike continued in command, still retaining his jovial manner of encouragement, directing the reorganization until the position could be held. The entire operation was carried on under terrific bombardment, and the example of courage and devotion to duty, as set by Lt. Col. Pike, established the highest standard of morale and confidence to all under his charge. The wounds he received were the cause of his death.

== See also ==
- List of Medal of Honor recipients
