= The Lexington (Des Moines, Iowa) =

- U.S. National Register of Historic Places
- U.S. Historic district – Contributing property
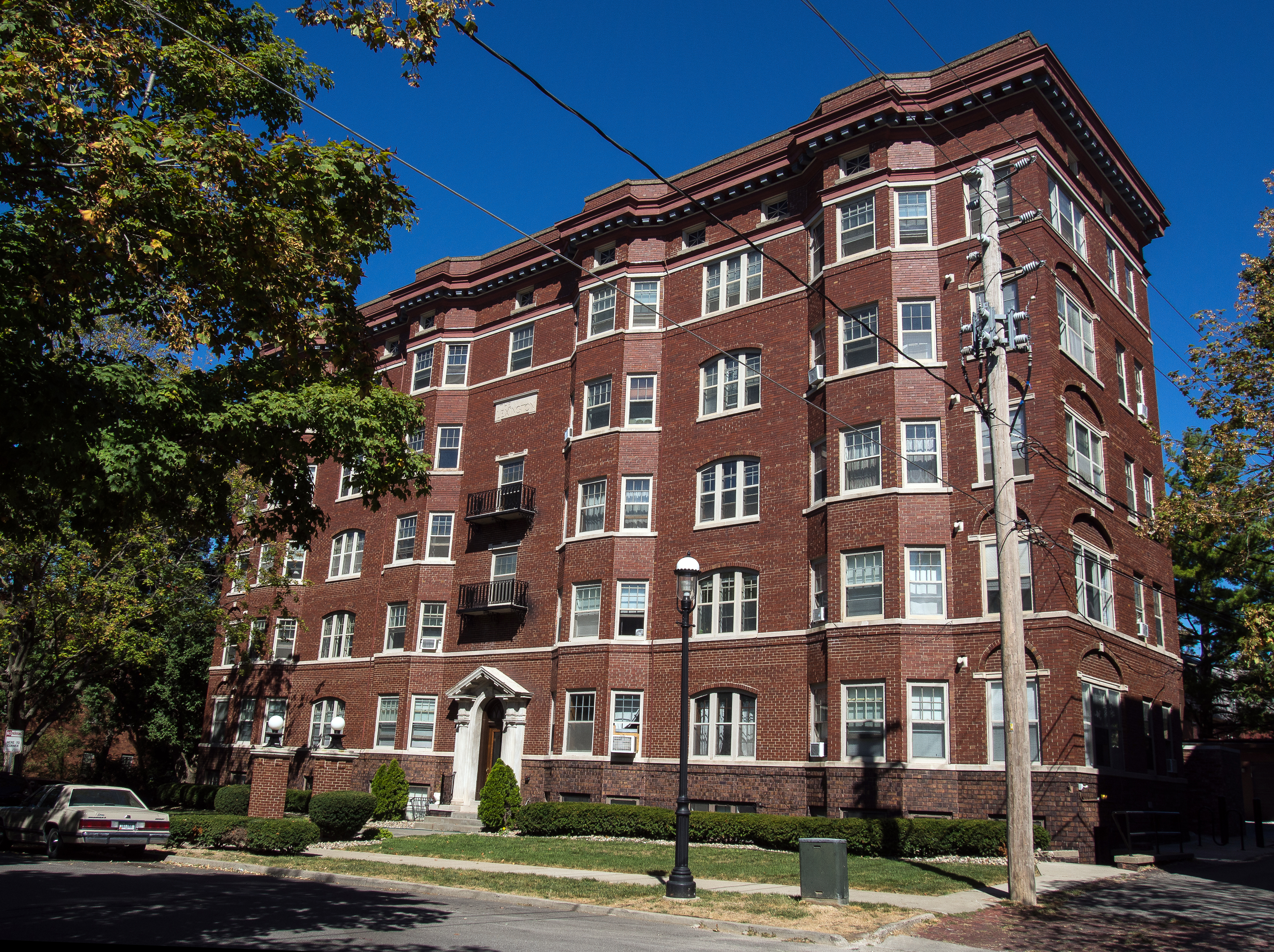

- Location within Iowa Location within the United States
- Location: 1721 Pleasant St. Des Moines, Iowa
- Coordinates: 41°35′24.3″N 93°38′27.5″W
- Area: less than one acre
- Built: 1908
- Architect: Fred Weitz
- Part of: Sherman Hill Historic District (ID79000926)
- NRHP reference No.: 76000800
- Added to NRHP: December 12, 1976

The Lexington, also known as Lexington Apartments, is a historic building located in Des Moines, Iowa, United States. The five-story brick structure on a raised basement was completed in 1908 as the city's first high-rise apartment building. It was designed and built by local architect-builder Fred Weitz. The exterior features a Colonial Revival style entrance with a recessed door, arched fanlight, and engaged Doric style columns that support the pediment. Wrought iron balconies are located on the two floors above the entrance. On the interior there are two apartments on every floor, and they originally featured servant's quarters. They have subsequently been converted into other purposes. The upper floors are served by a large, open-cage brass elevator. The building purportedly had paranormal activity involving its elevator. It was renovated between 2012 and 2014. It was individually listed on the National Register of Historic Places in 1976. The building was included as a contributing property in the Sherman Hill Historic District in 1979. It is currently owned by the Allen Family Trust.
