= Flora Dunlap =

American activist

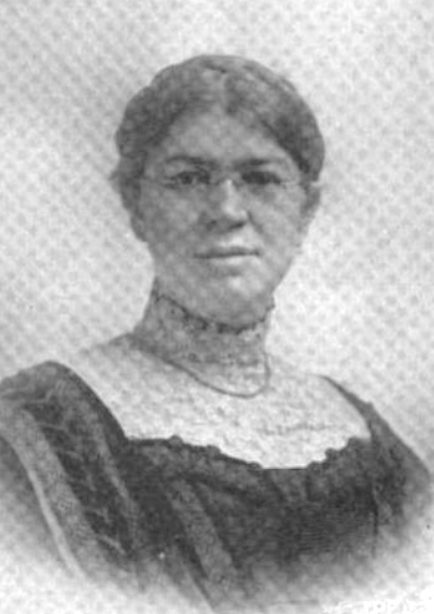
- Flora Dunlap, from a 1912 publication
- Born: 1872; Ohio, US
- Died: Unknown
- Occupations: Settlement worker; clubwoman; suffragist

Flora Dunlap (born 1872) was an American social worker and social reform activist in Iowa. She served as the president of the Iowa Equal Suffrage Association in 1913. She headed the Roadside Settlement House in Des Moines, Iowa. Dunlap was the first woman to ever serve on the Board of Education of Des Moines. She was a friend of Jane Addams and a supporter of the Women's Suffrage Movement.

== Early life and education ==
Dunlap was born in 1872 to Mary and Samuel W. Dunlap. Growing up in Circleville, Ohio, she attended school in nearby Columbus. She graduated from Cincinnati Wesleyan College.

== Settlement houses ==
Dunlap earned an apprenticeship at the Kingsley Settlement House a year later. Following the apprenticeship, Dunlap went on to live in the Goodrich House in Cleveland, as well as the Hull House in Chicago. Dunlap found the widespread fame of the Hull House to be “…a stimulating, an absorbing, and a bewildering place in which to live and work.” However, she wished to work in a smaller city rather than staying in Chicago despite her love for Hull House. After Dunlap resigned her position at the Roadside Settlement House in September 1916, she headed the Neighborhood Guild House in Brooklyn, New York. Dunlap ultimately returned to the Roadside Settlement in 1918, where she maintained head resident until 1924.

=== Roadside Settlement ===
Jane Addams referred Dunlap to the Roadside Settlement in Des Moines, and Dunlap accepted the position of head resident in 1904. Dunlap had been offered to go to another house in the east, however Addams believed she would have more autonomy in the western area. The settlement was located in a commercial neighborhood, causing a decrease in clientele to serve.

The settlement board voted to relocate the home to South Bottom near the Des Moines River. Dunlap oversaw the construction of this three-story brick building. The new home opened in 1906 and was regarded by Dunlap as one of her greatest achievements. As the Roadside house became open to the public, Dunlap established several programs including sewing and cooking classes, as well as manual training and literary clubs. Dunlap served as head resident of the Roadside Settlement House for two decades.

== Elected office and activism ==
=== Board of education ===
In 1912 Dunlap ran for the Des Moines school board. Her community involvement earned Dunlap the support of local women’s clubs who endorsed her candidacy and distributed her campaign advertisements in various local establishments. Dunlap won the election as the first woman to ever serve on the board. After three years of serving, Dunlap reported it was “the most unpleasant and most futile task” she had managed. Dunlap concluded the board was not ready for women and neglected to run for re-election after complaining none of the other male members would speak or listen to her opinions.

=== Iowa Equal Suffrage Association ===
During this same time period, Dunlap served as legislative chair of the Iowa Federation of Women’s Clubs. In 1913 Dunlap won the presidency of the Iowa Equal Suffrage Association. She held office for this position until 1916. During her three years of presidency, Dunlap took to the streets and visited 30 towns to hold educational open-air meetings. In 1916 Dunlap led a campaign in which an amendment to the state constitution was submitted to voters to allow women the right to vote. Dunlap was an active member of Des Moines Women's Club from 1907 to 1926.

In 1917 and 1918, Dunlap maintained the position of regional director of the girls division of the War Camp Community Service.
