= Henry C. Wallace House =

Historic house in Iowa, United States

- U.S. National Register of Historic Places
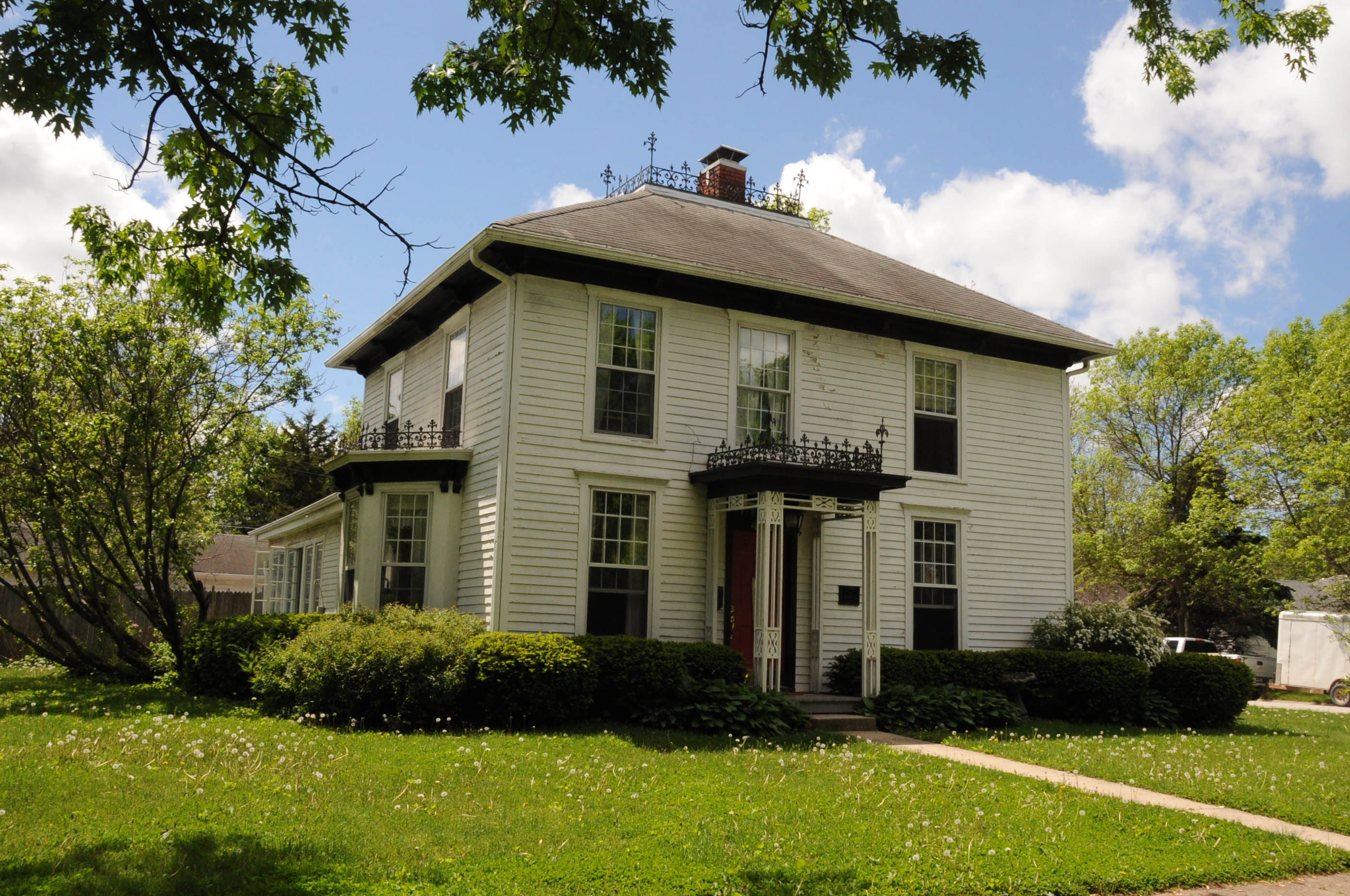

- Location within Iowa Location within the United States
- Location: 422 W. Jefferson; Winterset, Iowa
- Coordinates: 41°20′07″N 94°01′09″W
- Area: less than one acre
- Built: c. 1872
- Architectural style: Italianate
- NRHP reference No.: 85000005
- Added to NRHP: January 3, 1985

The Henry C. Wallace House is a historic residence located in Winterset, Iowa, United States. Wallace was the father of U.S. Secretary of Agriculture Henry C. Wallace, Jr. and the grandfather of U.S. Vice President Henry A. Wallace. He was a Presbyterian minister who moved to Winterset in 1877. He bought this Italianate house in 1882 from H.C. Price, who had it built. He and his wife Nanie owned the house for nine years when they sold it in March 1891. While he lived in town he became involved with the local newspaper business and bought the Winterset Chronicle and the Madisonian. He would go on to be the editor of the Iowa Homestead, a leading farm publication in Des Moines, and found Wallace's Farmer.

The two-story frame, Italianate, house features a hip roof, and ornamental iron work on the roof, above the main entry porch, and above the side window bay. At one time it had a wrap around porch. The house was listed on the National Register of Historic Places in 1985.

== See also ==
The following properties are associated with the Wallace family and are all listed on the National Register of Historic Places:

- Henry Wallace House in Des Moines, which is also listed on the National Register of Historic Places.
- Catalpa, a farm located southeast of Greenfield, Iowa
