= Des Moines Women's Club =

Historic Women's Association in Des Moines, Iowa

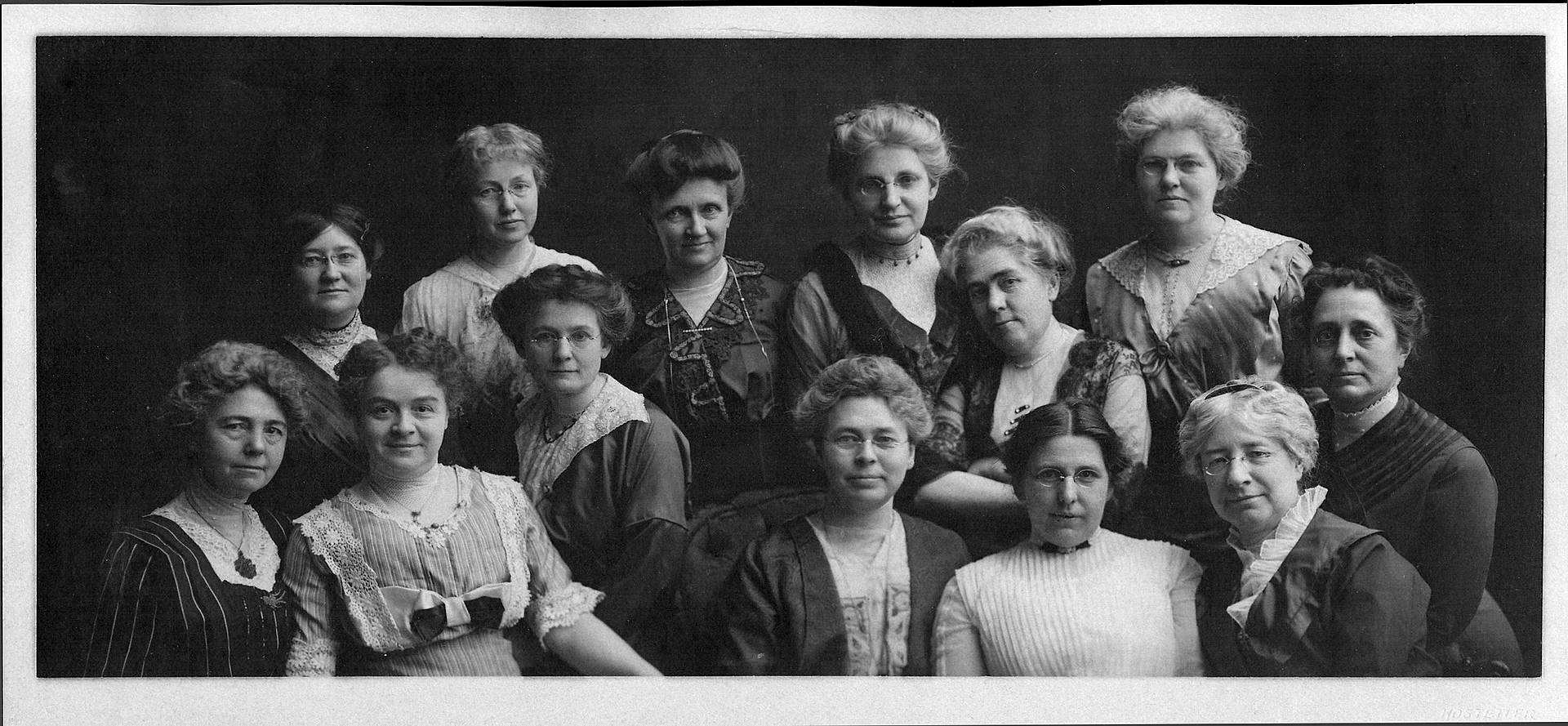
- The founders of the Des Moines Women's Club
- Abbreviation: DMWC
- Founded: October 20, 1885; 140 years ago
- Founders: Margaret Cleaves, Martha Callanan, Calista Halsey Patchin, Mrs. James Berryhill, Ella Hamilton Durley
- Headquarters: Hoyt Sherman Place, Des Moines
- Region served: Central Iowa
- Website: desmoineswomensclub.com

The Des Moines Women's Club, founded in 1885 as the women's club movement swept through the United States, today serves the Des Moines community by providing scholarships, support for the local arts community, and other civic projects.

== History ==
The Des Moines Women's Club was founded in Des Moines, Iowa, in 1885 by a group of five women inspired by the national women's movement developing in the second half of the nineteenth century. The woman's club movement was a social movement that took place throughout the United States that established the idea that women had a moral duty and responsibility to transform public policy. The women first met at Plymouth Church, Des Moines, Iowa at 5th and Grand Avenue, to form the club with twenty-two charter members. The first president of the club was Margaret Cleaves, a notable American physician. Another founder and the second president was Martha Callanan, a noted philanthropist and suffrage worker. Two noted journalists were also charter members: Ella Hamilton Durley and Calista Halsey Patchin. Other prominent founders were Mrs. Maria S. Orwig and Mrs. Julia Hunting, active members in the American Association for the Advancement of Women. The club members met at various places throughout the city during the early years. In 1894 club records state that there were 136 members. Dues were $2 per year.

Since its beginning, the club has provided strong support for the art community in central Iowa. In 1888 the club committed to establishing and maintaining an art gallery for the city. The first art was purchased for the club in 1893. In an article in the Des Moines Tribune "While a public art gallery has been the dream of each president...All the financial burdens of building and furnishing have been theirs (the club). The gallery contains a number of handsome paintings that have been selected during the past ten years."

On May 19, 1893, the club became a founding Iowa member of the General Federation of Women's Clubs. Women's Club Programs have brought many well known speakers to a Des Moines audience including Edna St. Vincent Millay, Dorothy Thompson, Amy Vanderbilt, Elsa Maxwell, Count Ilya Tolstoy, John Philip Sousa and his band, Will Rogers, Richard Halliburton, and John Erskine.

At the turn of the century, the club received from the city of Des Moines, the former Hoyt Sherman residence. The club agreed to maintain the building and to preserve the name Hoyt Sherman Place. In October 1907, the Des Moines Women's Club held its first meeting at Hoyt Sherman Place. The club women sat on the front steps because the inside of the house was being renovated and restored.

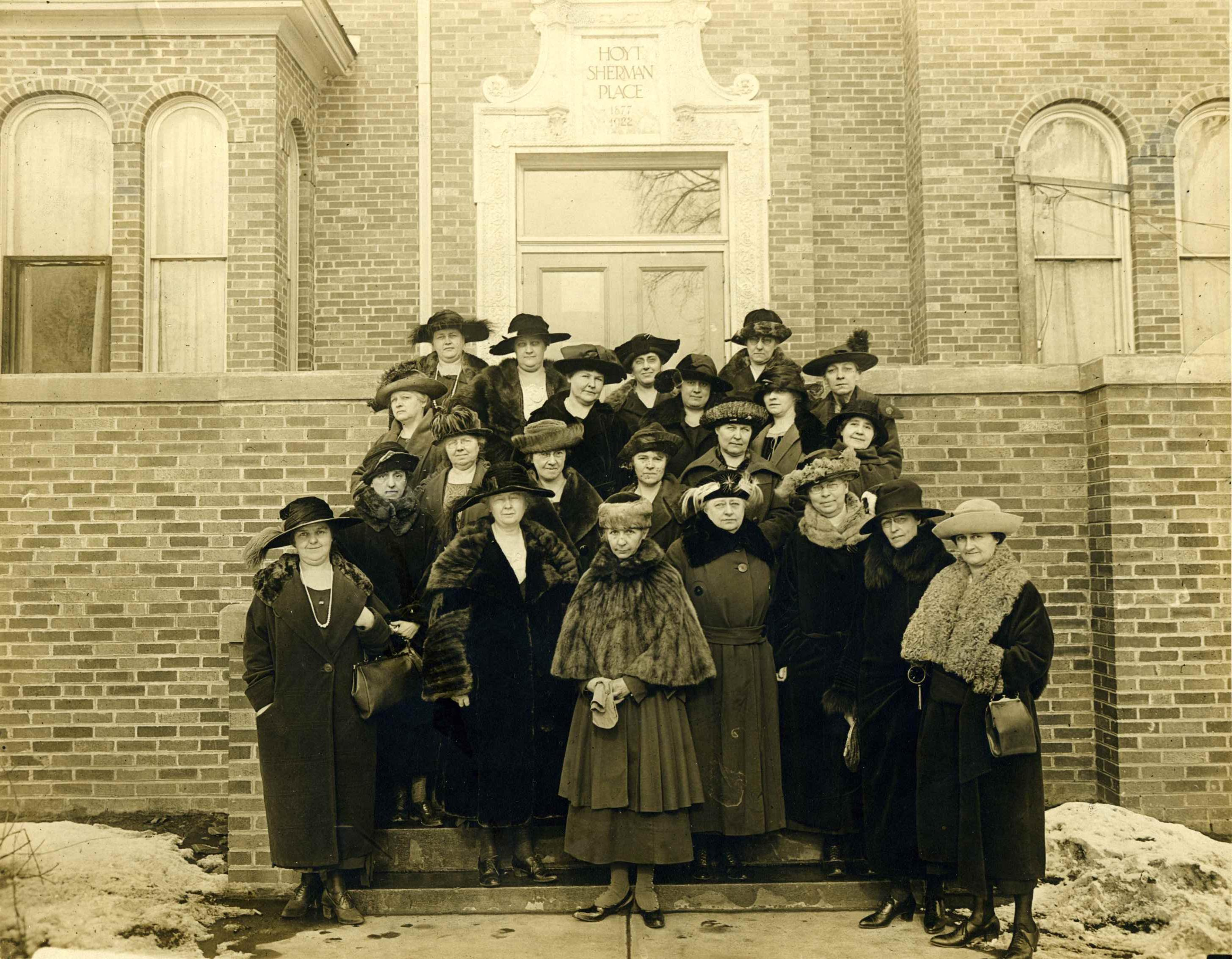
Officers, Des Moines Women's Club, ca.1920s

== The Progressive Movement and the Des Moines Women's Club ==
As part of the Progressive Era, The Des Moines Women's Club was active and influential in the "City Beautiful Movement" to develop the city riverfront and the "Des Moines Civic Center District" beginning in the 1890s. The document "City Beautiful Movement and City Planning in Des Moines Iowa 1892–1938" written for the National Register of Historic Places application, cites the Des Moines Women's Club as being very influential in the development of the riverfront, the public library and the Civic Center District. The chair of the Club Civic Committee was Mrs. Cora Bussey Hillis and the president of the club was Mrs. Virginia Berryhill.

Page 12 states:

Mrs. Cora Hillis...presented a resolution to the club favoring the river site. The measure passed at the special April 21, 1898 meeting of the Women's Club.

On page 17:

With the involvement of the Des Moines Women's Club, an additional influential segment of Des Moines society weighed in behind city planning and beautification, especially of the river front. Their commitment dates from at least 1898 when the library site was selected and probably went back to early Park Board work beginning in 1892... The Women's Club secured the blessing of the City Council to hire the nationally known city planning expert Charles Mulford Robinson. But the women assumed responsibility for the expense of his visit and report.

The only remaining copy of this report by Charles Mulford Robinson is housed in the archives of the Des Moines Women's Club and is available in digital form in the Club's digital archives. The copies from the City archives and Parks Department archives have been lost.

Page 37 states:

Women remained involved and continued to play a role in fostering river front. In 1929 J. N. (Ding) Darling...asked the Women's Club to sponsor specific plans for Civic Center development...the Women's Club raised $3,000 plus another $1,500 for a railroad survey (tied to acquiring a new Union Station.

The document concludes;

Collectively, examples of this property type call attention to the role of various individuals and public and private groups in bringing about change during the progressive period. They are thus associated with the roles of and interaction between the Des Moines Women's Club and Commercial Exchange, and local, state and federal governments in the City Beautiful Movement and city planning in Des Moines.

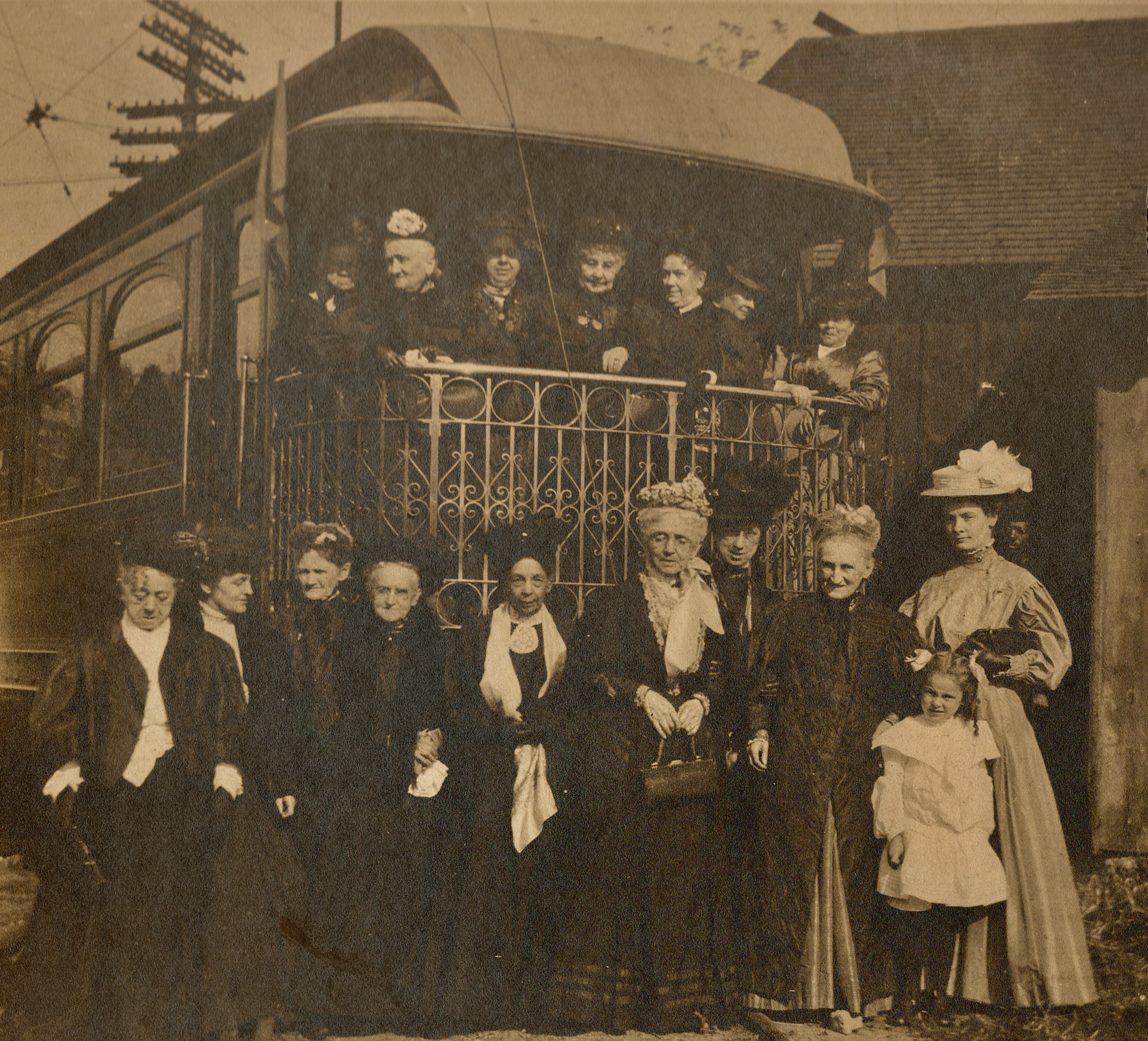
Des Moines Women's Club Members and Trolley

== Hoyt Sherman Place ==
The Hoyt Sherman Mansion was acquired by the club from the City of Des Moines in 1907 for $1 a year. At that time the club completely refurnished the house which had been emptied and used for two years by the Sisters of Mercy as a 52 bed hospital. The club built new additions to the house, first, the gallery room for its growing art collection and then in 1923, for $10,000, the club added the Byers Room to house the collection of paintings, artifacts and furnishings donated by the Major Samual Hawkins Marshall Byers family.

That same year the club mounted a capital campaign to build the theater addition to the house. The theater originally seated 1400 so that all club members could be seated.

Operated by the Des Moines Women's Club, today's Hoyt Sherman Place cradles the original home of Hoyt Sherman, a prosperous Des Moines resident...The original house, now in the center of today's structure was first leased to the Des Moines Women's Club by the Des Moines Board of Park Commissioners in 1907... The club's purpose at the time...was to bring culture to the city of Des Moines – and it remains the club's primary purpose today.

The Women's Club obtained the property from the city for $1 a year rental, and immediately restored the house and added a $10,000 art gallery... By 1908 the membership had expanded to 400, and the women were having successful art exhibits in their new building and leading citizens were speaking at their programs. During World War I, a limit of 1,000 was placed on membership.

In 1995 the Club formed the Hoyt Sherman Place Foundation as a separate nonprofit entity to administer, maintain, and preserve Hoyt Sherman Place. At that time, all the club art collections, artifacts and building were donated to the new foundation. The auditorium, which now seats 1200, underwent a major restoration in 2000 with funds raised by the new foundation. In 2019 a new capital campaign added a major addition to the theater wing and in 2020 a renovation of the original house began to restore it as a museum.

Hoyt Sherman Place exists today primarily due to the work of the Des Moines Women's Club and the generosity of the community... Added to the National Register of Historic Places in 1977, Hoyt Sherman Place is the cornerstone of the Sherman Hill neighborhood.

== Des Moines Women's Club Art Collection and Gallery ==
The club opened the art gallery in Hoyt Sherman Place after building the gallery room on the west side of the house. Soon the club began sponsoring an exhibition of local artists. For many years, the winning painting was added to the club collection. The Women's Club exhibit is the oldest bonafide art competition in Iowa. The club continues to sponsor this annual event.

The art collection of paintings and sculpture grew with purchases using Club funds as well as gifts from members and the community. It represents art from the Renaissance to early 20th century abstraction and reflects the tastes of the women who collected the art. The Club gallery now is home to a large collection of nineteenth and twentieth century paintings and classical sculpture.

One valuable painting, "To the Memory of Cole" by Frederic Edwin Church was "discovered" hanging in the club gallery in the 1980s. This painting was sold at Sotheby's to fund and endowment for the Hoyt Sherman Place foundation. The Hoyt Sherman Place Foundation completed a painting and frame conservation program based on adopt a painting fund raising in 2018. During the restoration project, two old masterpieces were "discovered" in storage at Hoyt Sherman Place.

== Scholarships ==
The club has funded scholarships for central Iowa students since 1903. The first scholarship was awarded on November 18, 1903, to Mr. Roy Stancliff, a student at the Cumming School of Art in Des Moines. The following year, 1904, "Professor Cumming reported that Mr. Barkalow had been unable to use the scholarship the entire year and he had thought the best substitute a very promising boy by the name of Leon Stitzell, who appeared before the ladies and made a freehand rapid sketch of Mrs. Mitchell in the act of presiding." Throughout the years many new scholarships have been funded through member bequests and the club funds four scholarships in Art, Music, Drama and Literature through dues and donations. In 2020 the club offered 17 scholarships for high school, college and graduate students for a total of $38,000.

== Membership ==
The club continues to serve the Des Moines community today by providing scholarships, support for the local arts community, support for Hoyt Sherman Place and other civic projects. The club has around 175 members both men and women, from Des Moines and surrounding communities. Meetings with programs and a luncheon are held every Wednesday from October through May. A few additional events are held in the summer months. There are no attendance requirements for members.

== Notable Achievements of the Des Moines Women’s Club ==
- Established the first art gallery and significant art collection for the City of Des Moines.
- Helped establish the Free Public Library of Des Moines.
- Funded the first city plan for Des Moines.
- Sponsored an annual art exhibition for Iowa artists since 1908.
- Provided scholarships for central Iowa students since 1903.
- Built a 1400 seat theater for the City in 1923 which still actively serves the community.
- Maintained a historic house for over a century.

== Notable Members ==
- Alice Crawford Baily, Activist, Suffragist
- Grace Ballantine, Attorney, Suffragist, Attorney for Mary Jane Coggeshall
- Virginia Berryhill, writer, activist
- Addie B. Billington, Suffragist, journalist
- Martha Callanan, Charter Member, Suffragist, Club President, Philanthropist
- Margaret Cleaves, Charter Member, Physician, Club President
- Cora M. Cummins (Mrs J.C.), activist, Club President, Life Member
- Ida L. Cummins, (Mrs. A.C) Activist and Iowa First Lady
- Ella Hamilton Durley, Charter Member, journalist, Club President
- Flora Dunlap, Social Worker, journalist
- Martha Crosby Frisbie (Mrs. A.L.), activist, Life Member
- Sophie Gillette, Charter Member, journalist
- Cora Bussey Hillis
- Maria Orwig, Charter Member, author, librarian
- Calista Halsey Patchin, Charter Member, journalist, artist
- Marie Waldt Riddle, educator
- Reverend Mary Safford, Unitarian Minister, activist
