= Hoyt Sherman =

American businessman and politician (1827–1904)

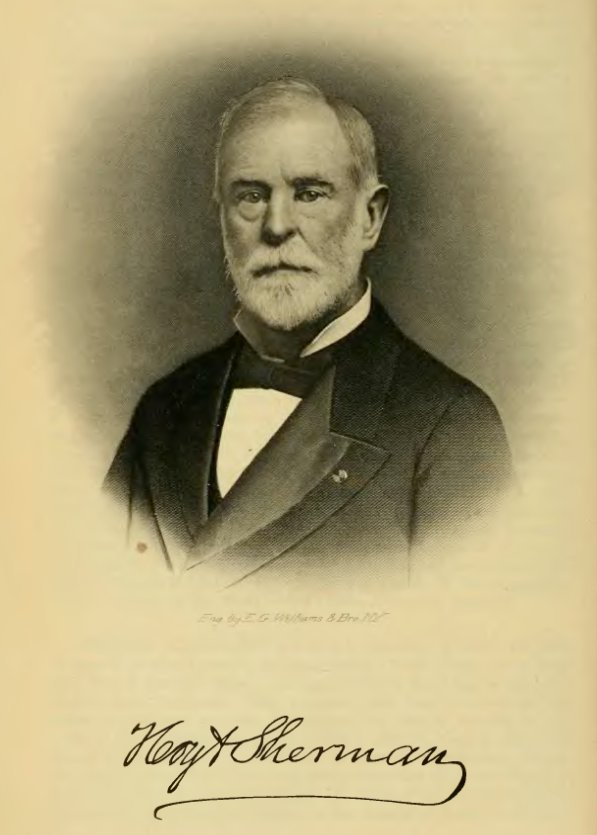
- Sherman in 1903

Member of the Iowa House of Representatives from the Polk County district
- In office 1866–1866 Serving with George Lute Godfrey
- Preceded by: Nicholas Baylies
- Succeeded by: John A. Kasson and Joshua H. Hatch

Personal details
- Born: November 21, 1827 Lancaster, Ohio, U.S.
- Died: January 25, 1904 (aged 76) Des Moines, Iowa, U.S.
- Resting place: Woodland Cemetery
- Party: Republican
- Spouse: Sarah Elvira Moulton (m. 1855; died 1887)
- Relations: William T. Sherman (brother); Charles Taylor Sherman (brother); John Sherman (brother); Sara Sherman Wiborg (granddaughter); Mary Hoyt Wiborg (granddaughter)
- Parent: Charles R. Sherman (father)

Hoyt Sherman (November 21, 1827 – January 25, 1904) was an American banker and politician. He served as a member of the Iowa House of Representatives in 1866.

== Early life ==
Hoyt Sherman was born in 1827 in Lancaster, Ohio. He was the youngest of eleven children born to Mary (née Hoyt) Sherman (1787–1852) and Charles R. Sherman, a lawyer who was a justice on the Ohio Supreme Court, who died unexpectedly of typhoid fever in 1829. Among his siblings were U.S. Federal Judge Charles Taylor Sherman, U.S. Senator John Sherman, and Major General William T. Sherman.

Until eighteen years of age, Hoyt's time was divided between school and the printing office as he apprenticed under his brothers Charles and John in Mansfield, Ohio. In the spring of 1848 he came to Fort Des Moines, Iowa, then far out on the western frontier.

== Career ==
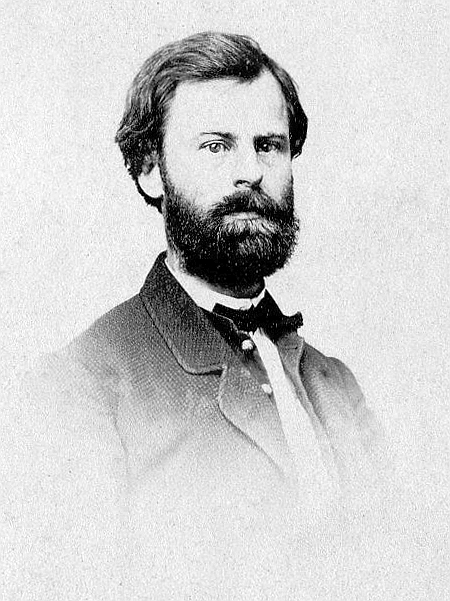
Sherman, c. 1860

In 1849, he was admitted to the bar and began to practice law, and also engaged in real estate business. In March of that year he was appointed by President Zachary Taylor postmaster of Des Moines, holding that position until the inauguration of President Franklin Pierce, when he resigned and was elected clerk of the District Court. President Abraham Lincoln appointed him the Army Paymaster at the start of the Civil War, with the rank of Major.

Upon his return, Hoyt teamed up with others and created Equitable of Iowa Insurance Company. During this time, he also gave his counsel, his time, and his money to ensure Des Moines had schools, including a college, a waterworks system, and many more facilities.

In 1854, he was the senior member of the banking house of Hoyt Sherman & Co., and upon the establishment of the State Bank of Iowa he became cashier of the Des Moines branch and was one of the directors on part of the State to supervise the system and guard the public interests. When the American Civil War began Mr. Sherman was appointed by President Abraham Lincoln paymaster in the Union army with the rank of major, holding the position for three years. He was one of the organizers of the Equitable Life Insurance Company of Iowa and for many years its general manager. That institution owes much of its stability and high standing to Major Sherman's reputation for integrity and skillful management.

In 1866, Major Sherman was a member of the House of the Eleventh General Assembly where he was chairman of the committee on railroads and a member of the committee of ways and means. In 1886, he was one of the founders of the Pioneer Lawmakers' Association and was one of its most influential members, serving as president and long a member of the executive committee. He contributed valuable historical articles to the Annals of Iowa on "Early Banking in Iowa", and on the "State Bank of Iowa". For many years he was the chief executive officer of the Associated Charities of Des Moines.

== Personal life ==
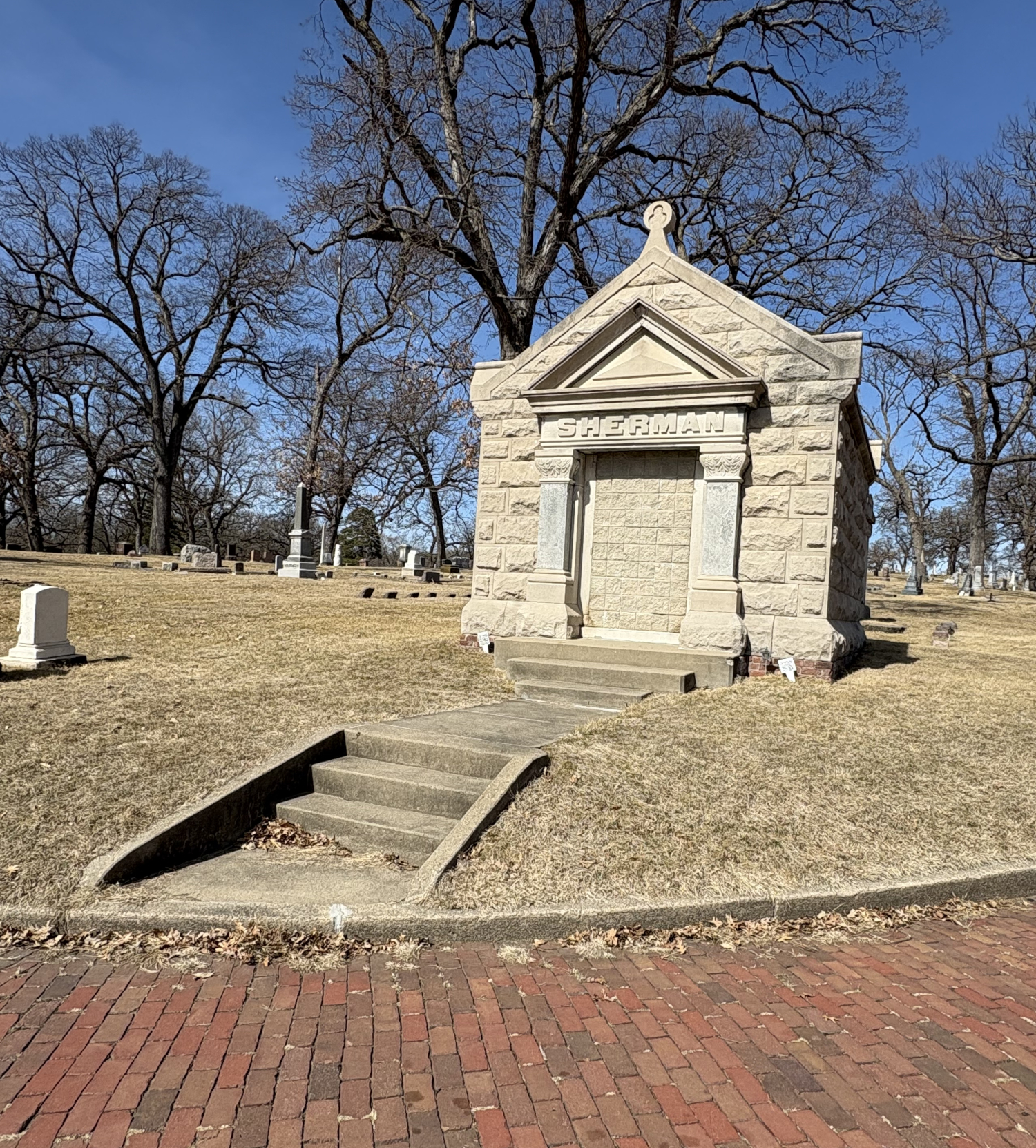
Sherman mausoleum at Woodland Cemetery

On December 25, 1855, Sherman was married to Sarah Elvira Moulton (1837–1887), a daughter of Daniel Alonzo Moulton and Adaline (née Wallace) Moulton. Together, they were the parents of:

- Frank Allen Sherman (1857–1902), who married Ada Louise Bacon, a daughter of Capt. George S. Bacon.
- Adeline Moulton Sherman (1859–1917), who married Frank Bestow Wiborg in 1882.
- Charles Moulton Sherman (1866–1911), who married Bertha Bartlett, a daughter of Joseph J. Bartlett.
- Arthur Hoyt Sherman (1869–1945), who married Corsa Linnie Kintzley, a daughter of William Worth Kintzley.
- Helen Sherman (1873–1961), who married William O. Griffith.

Sherman died on January 25, 1904, in Des Moines, Iowa, and was interred at Woodland Cemetery.

=== Descendants ===
Through his daughter Adeline, he was a grandfather of arts patron Sara Sherman Wiborg, playwright Mary Hoyt Wiborg, and Olga (née Wiborg) Fish (wife of Sidney Webster Fish, a son of Stuyvesant Fish).

=== Hoyt Sherman Place ===
In 1877, Sherman built a mansion. The structure is now a museum and performing arts center. Following his death, the park board bought the Hoyt Sherman Place and an adjoining 3 acres (1.2 ha) in 1907. The original house and gallery now display a collection of 19th- and 20th-century paintings, as well as elaborately carved 17th-century furniture and other rare artifacts. The mansion lent its name to the surrounding Des Moines neighborhood of Sherman Hill. For many years Hoyt Sherman Place has served as the headquarters for Des Moines Women's Club. The house, gallery, and theater are now under the management of the Hoyt Sherman Place Foundation.

== Sources ==
- Holden-Reid, Brian (2020). The Scourge of War: The Life of William Tecumseh Sherman. Oxford University Press. ISBN 978-0-19539-273-9. See book review at Bordewich, Fergus M. (May 29, 2020). "'The Scourge of War' Review: A Long March Into Myth". The Wall Street Journal.
- Marszalek, John F. (2007) [1992]. Sherman: A Soldier's Passion for Order (Reissued with new preface ed.). Southern Illinois University Press. ISBN 978-0-02-920135-0.
