= Ella Hamilton Durley =

American educator, newspaper editor, and journalist

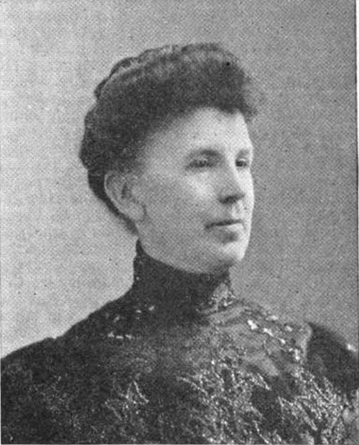
- "A Woman of the Century"
- Born: Ella Adaline Hamilton ca. 1852; Harrisville, Pennsylvania, U.S.
- Died: August 14, 1922; Redlands, California, U.S.
- Education: Iowa State University
- Occupations: educator; newspaper editor; journalist
- Spouse: Preston B. Durley (m. 1886; died 1896)
- Writing career
- Pen name: "Judith Jorgenson"
- Language: English

Ella Hamilton Durley (née, Hamilton; pen name, Judith Jorgenson; ca. 1852 – August 14, 1922) was an American educator, newspaper editor, and journalist. She was also a peace activist and supported woman's suffrage. Durley did noteworthy work on the Saturday Mail, a Des Moines weekly publication, but her professional life was mainly given to the Des Moines Daily News, of which her husband, Preston B. Durley and her brother, John J. Hamilton, with herself, were the principal owners. Under the pen name of "Judith Jorgenson", she conducted a column of stories of real life, "Around the Evening Lamp", for many years, and it was considered especially creditable.

As editor of The News Junior, she became the literary guide and mentor of the children of Iowa, who competed for artistic pictures which hung in hundreds of schoolhouses all over the state. Later, she became editor of the Homemaker Magazine, and still later, associate editor of the National Daily Review of Chicago, afterwards merged in the Women's National Daily of St. Louis in the latter capacity, visiting all parts of the country, interviewing former President Grover Cleveland at his home in Princeton, New Jersey, and other men and women of distinction. According to Printers' Ink Publishing Company, she was "one of the two or three most successful newspaper women of the United States".

== Early life and education ==
Ella Adaline Hamilton was born in Harrisville, Pennsylvania, circa 1852. She was the oldest daughter of William Hamilton, a Union soldier and his wife, Catherine (née Logan; d. 1905). She had three siblings: a sister, Mary H. Hamilton, and two brothers, John J. Hamilton and LaMonte Hamilton. She was the granddaughter of another Union soldier, Robert Logan, and of General William Hamilton, who served in the Indian Wars and the War of 1812; and the great-greanddaughter of Hugh Hamilton, a revolutionary soldier, hence she was a member of the order of the Daughters of the American Revolution.

Born in a home that was a station of the Underground Railroad, with hiding of fugitive slaves on their way to Canada and freedom-, he was ever an advocate and champion of political, social, and economic liberty. Durley lived in northwestern Pennsylvania for fourteen years. In the spring of 1866, the family moved to Iowa City in Davis County, Iowa, where they made their home for four years.

It was in the schoohouse of that locality that Durley acquired sufficient education to permit her to begin to teach at the age of sixteen. The loss of her father, whose ambition for his children was limitless, led her to make the attempt to carry out his oft-expressed wish that she should take a college course. To do so meant hard work and strenuous application as she had to pay her own way. She studied at Iowa State University for eight years; in the spring of 1878, she took the degree of B. A. in Iowa State University, and in 1892, she received the degree of M. A.

== Career ==
After graduation, Durley became the principal of the high school in Waterloo, Iowa, a position she held for two years. She then went to Europe to continue her studies, more especially in the German language and literature. She spent a year in European travel and study, including a course of lectures in the Victoria Lyceum of Berlin, and an inspection of the school system of Germany and Italy.

Upon her return, she lectured widely and these were well received. After a year spent in the Iowa State Library, Durley decided to enter newspaper work. She became associate editor of the Des Moines Mail and Times, which position she held over a year, when an offer caused her to become editor-in-chief of the Northwestern Journal of Education. Her later journalistic work was in connection with the Des Moines Daily News, upon which she served as reporter and editorial and special writer for several years.

In 1884, Durley was appointed a member of the State Education Board of Examiners for Iowa, which position she held until 1888, serving most of her time as secretary. In 1885 she became a charter member of the Des Moines Women's Club. She served as president of the club in 1891-1892. In October 1886, she married Preston B. Durley, business manager of the Des Moines Daily News. For a year, they homesteaded in South Dakota. Newspaper work was kept up uninterruptedly until the summer of 1890, when her son, John, was born. By 1905, she was associated with her brother, John J. Hamilton, and others in the ownership and publication of the Chicago Daily Review, where she served as writer, an expert in circulation management, and an authority on advertising; it was a national daily newspaper for American women and the American home.

Durley wrote two novels, My Soldier Lady and The Standpatters. She was also a convincing public speaker; her lectures on Margaret Fuller and on her travels were very successful.

== United Sisterhood of Peace ==
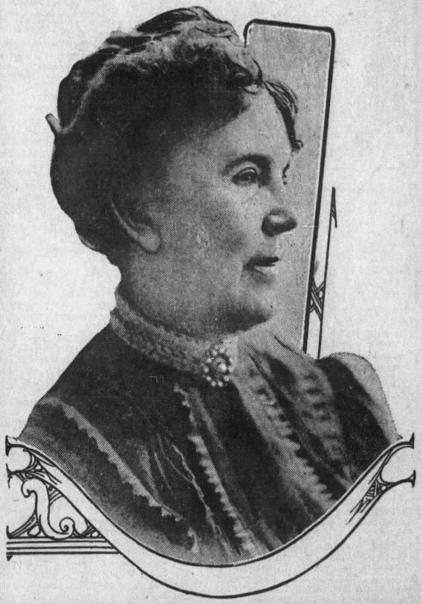
Ella Hamilton Durley (1916)

The United Sisterhood of Peace was organized at Los Angeles in June, 1916, by Durley, who drew to her aid seven women, who became the Mother Circle. Within a few days each of these ladies had chosen her own circle—a circle of seven, of which she became the Elder Sister, the first fifty thus coming into the organization becoming the charter membership. Each member pledged herself to secure six other members within a reasonable time, each of whom pleadged herself to perform the same service. All the members promised to work untiringly for unity, peace, and harmony in their own neighborhoods, their own country, and throughout the world. In the same year, a second circle was founded in Chicago.

The United Sisterhood of Peace had for its basic principle a belief in the sincerity of women in their declarations against war and in favor of the settlement of international questions by means of mediation through an international tribunal. Believing also that war was not the last word in human wisdom, members of this organization were happy to enter upon a definite constructive plan for universal and enduring peace. Returning European travelers said that throughout the belligerent countries there was a growing consciousness of the utter futility of war.

It was the hope of the society to establish a universal peace in seven years: to "unify the women of California in 1916, of the United States in 1917, of North America in 1918, of South America in 1919, of Europe in 1920, of Asia in 1921, and the women of Africa and the islands of the sea in 1922—the world in seven years:. The motto of the Sisterhood was: "We have no prejudices; every woman is our sister and every man our brother." The obligation members assumed was: "We pledge ourselves to be faithful members of the United Sisterhood of Peace; to organize and conduct circles in affiliation with the mother circle, and to work untiringly for unity, peace, and harmony in our own neighborhoods, our own country, and throughout the world, always thinking and speaking well of all persons, races, and nations, and forgetting their faults."

Membership was promoted by means of numbered cards, signed by the Elder Sister, followed by the members of her circle. To each one a card was given of a higher number, which she, in turn, signed as Elder Sister, and proceeded to fill with her own circle. She also gave to each six cards of a still higher number, so that each would be provided with cards to continue her work. A circle could, if it desire, elect an Elder Brother. One of the first to indicate his approval was that distinguished pacifist, David Starr Jordan, who became an honorary patron of the organization. Henry Ford and William Jennings Bryan wrote expressing their high appreciation of the plan and their belief in its effectiveness.

Endless-chain systems came under the ban of the Post Office Department several years prior, but when the Postal Inspector made an investigation of the "sisterhood" and its aims, he announced that, as there were no profits to be made and as the "system will run out everywhere after a time, the postal authorities would not interfere.

== Affiliations ==
She was the founder of the Des Moines Home for the Aged, the largest institution of the kind in Iowa; and led in the organization of the Deutsche Gesellschaft, a club for German literature and conversation. Prior to 1885, Durley was a member of the Association for Advancement of Women, which in the autumn of that year, was organized into the Des Moines Women's Club. She was a charter member of it and one of the first presidents; it was the strongest women's organization in the State. She was president of the Des Moines Women's Press Club and the Des Moines Federation of Women's Clubs. Durley did church work. She was active in the Friday Morning Club, the Women's City Club, the League of American Penwomen, and the Public Power League. Durley had a hand in naming and launching the cruiser, Des Moines. She organized central Iowa in the work of sending a shipload of Iowa corn to the Russian famine sufferers. In 1894, Durley obtained for Des Moines a fine art loan, this being the first ever held in that city. Durley was a suffragist.

As a girl at Iowa City, she became acquainted with Susan B. Anthony and Mary A. Livermore; and as a clubwoman at Des Moines, she became the friend of such women as Julia Ward Howe. Her own home at Des Moines was for years the rendezvous of the Iowa Press and Authors' club, which she organized. Iowa's most eminent men and women of letters, people such as Emerson Hough, Woods Hutchinson, and Alice French (Octave Thanet) met there to exchange experiences.

== Later life ==
Durley's husband died in January 1896. In 1911, she and her son moved to California, and became residents of Los Angeles. Durley's son died in California in December 1919. Ella Durley died in Redlands, California, August 14, 1922.

== Selected works ==
=== Books ===
- My Soldier Lady (1908). She uses "Ella H. Durley" on the book cover, and "Ella Hamilton Durley" on the frontispiece.
- The Standpatters (1912)

=== Judith Jorgenson, editor ===
- Des Moines Daily News
- Northwestern JOurnal of Education
