= Catalpa (Greenfield, Iowa) =

- U.S. National Register of Historic Places
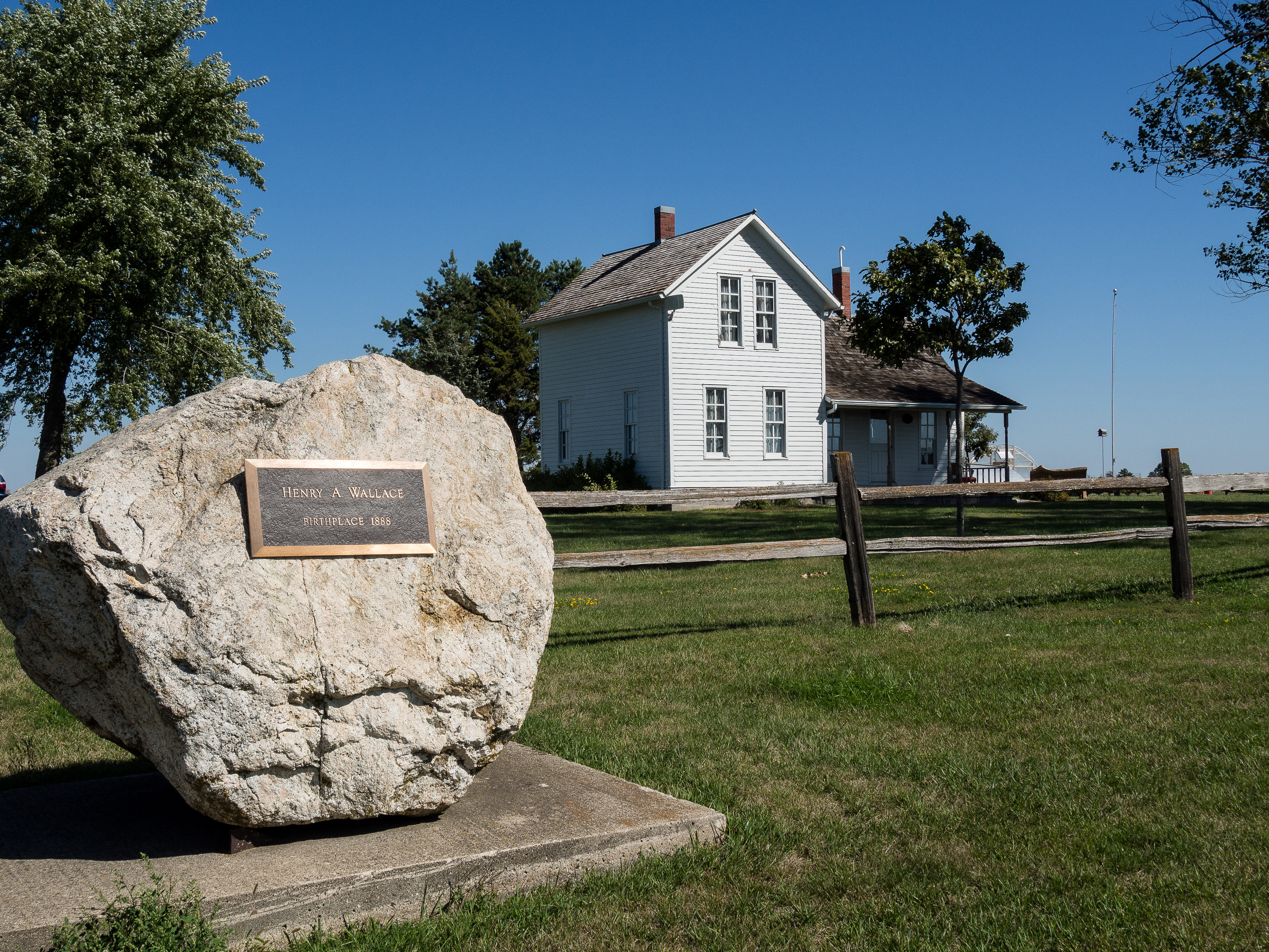

- Location within Iowa Location within the United States
- Location: Southeast of Greenfield, Iowa
- Coordinates: 41°13′55″N 94°21′37″W
- Area: 200 acres (81 ha)
- NRHP reference No.: 74000776
- Added to NRHP: November 13, 1974

Catalpa, generally known as Wallace Farm, is a historic farm located near the small city of Orient, Iowa, United States. It is associated with Henry Cantwell Wallace, who owned and operated the influential agricultural publication Wallaces' Farmer, and served as U.S. Secretary of Agriculture (1921-1924). It is also associated with his son, Henry Agard Wallace, who followed his father at the newspaper and served as U.S. Secretary of Agriculture (1933-1940), Vice President of the United States (1941-1945) and U.S. Secretary of Commerce (1945-1946). He was the Progressive Party candidate for president in 1948. This was one of several farms owned by the Rev. Henry Wallace, Henry Cantwell's father. It was acquired by the family in 1877, and it was operated by a tenant farmer until Henry "Harry" Cantwell took it over. His son, Henry Agard, was born here in 1888. After five years, Harry returned to his studies at Iowa State University in Ames and the family left the farm at that time.

Catalpa was listed on the National Register of Historic Places in 1974 (as "southeast of Greenfield). The designation includes the farmhouse and outbuildings, which are modest frame structures with gable roofs, and a 200-acre (81 ha) plot of farmland. The house and barn were built before the Wallaces moved here in 1887.

== See also ==
The following properties are associated with the Wallace family and are all listed on the National Register of Historic Places:

- Henry Wallace House in Des Moines, Iowa
- Henry C. Wallace House in Winterset, Iowa
