= Margaret Cleaves =

American physician

Margaret A. Cleaves
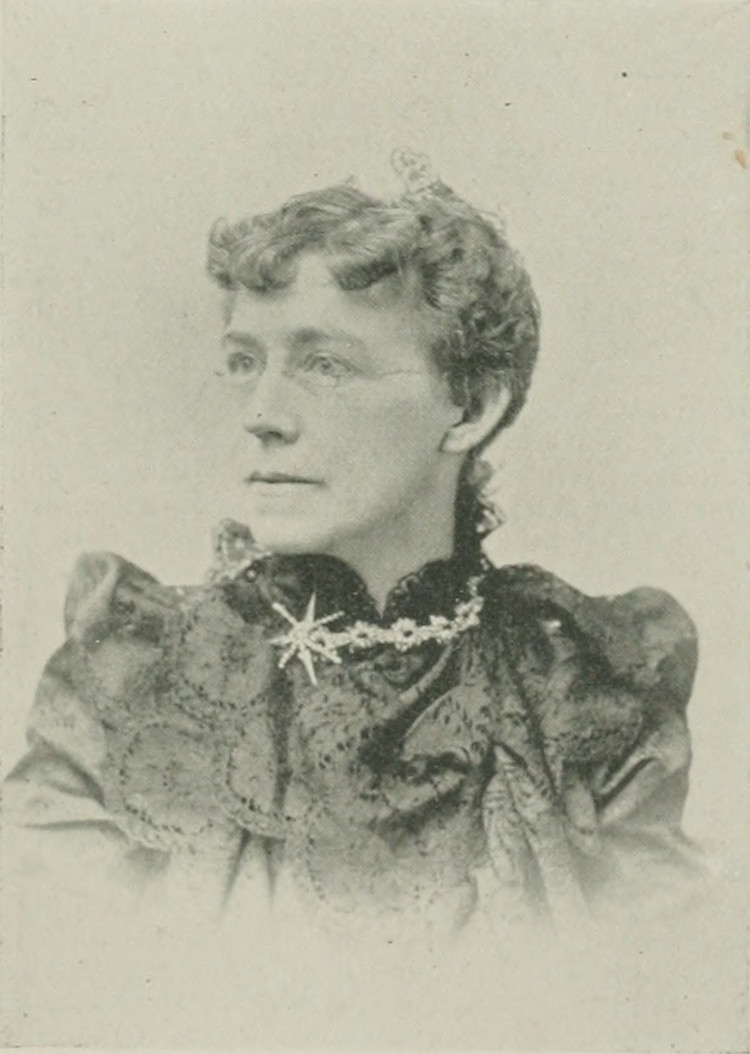
- "A Woman of the Century".
- Born: November 25, 1848; Columbus City, Iowa, U.S.
- Died: November 7, 1917 (aged 68); Mobile, Alabama, U.S.
- Education: University of Iowa Medical Department (M.D.)
- Known for: pioneer of electrotherapy and brachytherapy

Margaret Abigail Cleaves (November 25, 1848 – November 7, 1917), M.D., was an American physician and scientific writer. She was a pioneer of electrotherapy and brachytherapy, instructor in Electro-Therapeutics New York Post-Graduate Medical School, President of the Women's Medical Society of New York, a Fellow of the American Electro-Therapeutic Association, a member of the Société Francaise d'Électrothérapie, a Fellow of the New York Academy of Medicine, Editor of Asylum Notes: Journal of Nervous and Mental Disease, 1891–2, a member of the Medical Society of the County of New York, a member of the American Medical Association, and a member of the New York Electrical Society.

Cleaves was licensed to practice medicine in Iowa (1873), Illinois (1876), Pennsylvania (1880) and New York (1890). She lectured and had clinical practice in London, Paris, Leipzig, Berlin and New York. From 1873 to 1876, Cleaves worked as an assistant physician at the State Hospital for the Insane, Mt. Pleasant, Iowa. Cleaves was the first woman physician to regularly treat mental illness at that institution, and subsequently served as a member of the board of trustees. From 1880 to 1883, Cleaves was physician-in-chief of the Women's Department, State Hospital for the Insane in Harrisburg, Pennsylvania. In 1885, Cleaves was appointed to the University of Iowa Medical Department's examining committee, "perhaps the first woman to serve in that capacity in the United States." In 1895, Cleaves founded the New York Electro-Therapeutic Clinic, Laboratory and Dispensary in New York City. Her work there included the treatment of a large number of cases of neurasthenia among both male and female patients.

Cleaves was a prolific author on topics concerning the use of radiation and electricity to treat illnesses. Cleaves also invented a variety of instruments for such treatments. Having an interest in the welfare and advancement of women, She organized the Des Moines Women's Club and served as its first president.

== Early life and education ==
Margaret Abigail Cleaves was born in Columbus City, Iowa, November 25, 1848. Her father was of Dutch and English descent, and her mother of Scotch and Irish ancestry, but both had been born in the United States. Cleaves' father, Dr. John Trow Cleaves, was born in Yarmouth, Maine, in 1813, and her mother, Elizabeth Stronach, in Baltimore, in 1820. In 1843, they were married in Columbus City, where Dr. John Cleaves practiced medicine until his death in October 1863. He had been twice elected to the Iowa State Legislature, first in 1852, and again in 1861.

Cleaves was the third of seven children. She inherited her father's taste for the medical profession, and as a child, sometimes accompanied him on patient visits.

Cleaves was educated at public schools and eventually enrolled in the University of Iowa, but was unable to complete her undergraduate degree due to financial difficulty. After she was sixteen, she alternately attended and taught school for some years. In 1868, Cleaves and her family moved to Davenport, Iowa. There, Cleaves reportedly resolved to become a doctor. Her choice of a profession disapproved of by various members of her family. In 1870, Cleaves began to study medicine and enrolled in Medical Department of the University of Iowa against her family's wishes. In 1871, she entered the office of her preceptor, Dr. W. F. Peck, who was dean of the faculty and professor of surgery in the university. She graduated on March 5, 1873, at the head of the class.

== Career ==
=== Physician ===
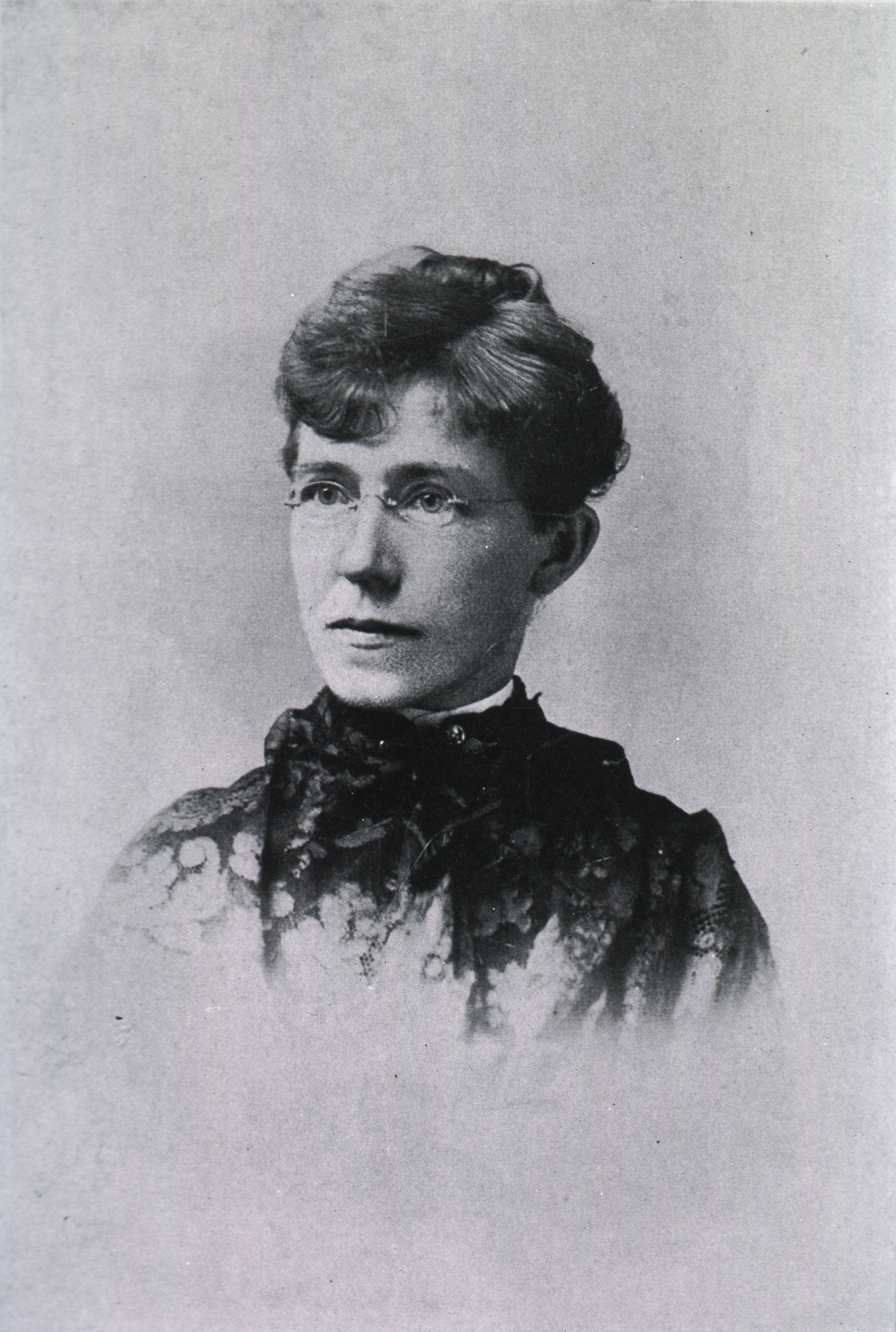
Margaret Cleaves.

Shortly after graduating, Cleaves was appointed second assistant physician in the State Hospital for the Insane in Mount Pleasant, Iowa. There, she was a veritable pioneer, for up to that time, only one other woman in the world had occupied the position of physician in a public insane asylum. She remained in the asylum for three years and then resigned her position to commence private practice in Davenport, She was subsequently appointed one of the trustees of the asylum.

While practicing medicine in Davenport, she became a member of the Scott County Medical Society, being the second woman to gain admission to that body. For several years, she was the secretary of the society. She also joined the State Medical Society, where she was again the second woman to gain admission. She was the first woman to become a member of the Iowa and Illinois Central District Medical Association. During her residence in Davenport she was an active member of the Davenport Academy of Sciences.

In 1879, the board of trustees of the State Asylum for the Insane chose her their delegate to the National Conference of Charities, which that year met in Chicago, Illinois. In that conference, she read a paper on "The Medical and Moral Care of Female Patients in Hospitals for the Insane." It attracted widespread attention, and was printed in a volume, Lunacy in Many Lands, which was published by the Government of New South Wales. In June 1880, she was appointed by the Governor of Iowa a Slate delegate to the National Conference of Charities in Cleveland, Ohio, and thus the distinction was conferred upon her of being the first female delegate from Iowa to that body. She reported for the State to the conference, and her report was subsequently incorporated in the Governor's annual message. That same year she was appointed physician-in-chief in the Female Department of the Pennsylvania State Lunatic Hospital in Harrisburg. After three years, Cleaves resigned due to failing health.

She went abroad in 1883, remaining nearly two years, visiting insane hospitals in Scotland, England, France, Italy, Germany, Austria, Switzerland, and Belgium, everywhere receiving courtesies from men of recognized eminence in the treatment of insanity. She witnessed operations in general hospitals in England, France, and Germany, and in Paris, she was for several months a regular attendant at lectures and clinics. After returning to the United States, she opened a private home for the reception of patients in Des Moines, Iowa, conducting also an office practice in connection with her other work. In March 1885, she was appointed one of the examining committee of the Medical Department of the Iowa State University. It was the first honor of that kind bestowed on a woman by any standard medical school in the United States. In July 1886, she was sent as a delegate to the yearly meeting of the National Conference of Charities, which was held in St. Paul, Minnesota. During her residence in Des Moines, she was an active member of the Polk County Medical Society, of the Missouri Valley Medical Association and of the Iowa State Medical Association. In 1885-86 she served as the first president and charter member of the Des Moines Women's Club Before all those bodies she read papers and she served the last-named body as chairman of obstetrics and gynaecology in the session of 1889. At that time she was the only woman who had received such an appointment.

In the medical fields of radiation oncology and gynaecology, Margaret Cleaves is remembered as the first physician to successfully apply radium in the treatment of cancer of the uterine cervix. In her seminal paper of October 1903, she wrote:

"...an inoperable primary pelvic case of epithelioma, involving the cervix, anterior and posterior vaginal walls, almost to the introitus; rectum, bladder, and both broad ligaments." (page 605)

The patient was treated first by a combination of x-rays and ultraviolet light, followed by intravaginal insertion of one gram of bromide of radium in a sealed glass tube. On September 15, 1903, the patient had radium brachytherapy for five minutes to the posterior wall of the vagina, followed by five minutes to the anterior surface, because of the vesical involvement. A second application of five minutes was given on September 16, 1903.

"September 21, 1903. Five days subsequent to the use of radium, no bleeding, no odor, no discharge, no ulceration, and vaginal and cervical mucous membrane normal in appearance." (page 605)

"September 28. Is looking and feeling well. No symptoms; still no bleeding from rectum since radium first used, two weeks since."

Since then, brachytherapy is a pivotal part of the curative treatment for women with inoperable cervical cancer. Cleaves introduced a technique that has saved the lives of millions of women with cancer.

=== Activist and writer ===
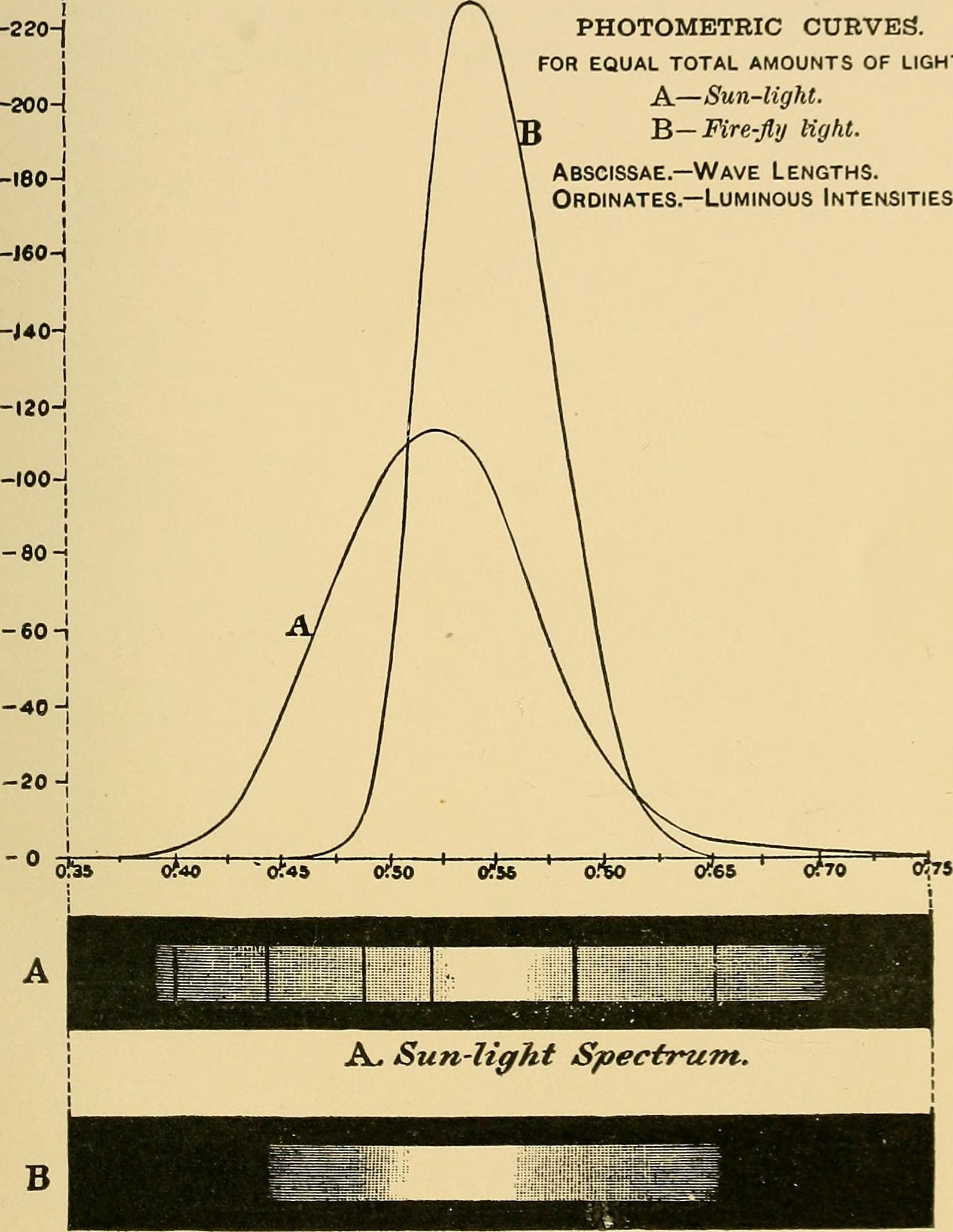
Illustration from Light energy, its physics, physiological action and therapeutic applications (1904).

Her work was not confined to medicine alone. She took a deep interest in all that pertained to the welfare and advancement of women. She organized the Des Moines Women's Club and was its first president. Some time prior to that, she had become a member of the Association for the Advancement of Women. Becoming interested in the subject of electro-therapeutics, she went to New York in the winter of 1887 and to Paris in the following summer, to prosecute her inquiries and investigation. After her return, she continued to practice for a while in Des Moines, but in 1890, she moved to New York City. She there joined the Medical Society of the County of New York, the American Electro-Therapeutic Association and the New York Women's Press Club. In the Post-Graduate Medical School, New York, she served as clinical assistant to the chair of electro-therapeutics. Since she took up her residence in New York, she read papers before the Medical Society of Kings County, Brooklyn, the New York Medico-Legal Society, the American Electro-Therapeutic Association and the National Conference of Charities. Many of them were published, and all of them were distinguished by painstaking research, clearness of statement, and logical reasoning. She was author of Light Energy: Its Physics, Physiological Action and Therapeutic Application, and American editor of the Journal of Physiological Therapeutics, London.

Cleaves died in a hospital in Mobile, Alabama, November 7, 1917.

== Selected works ==
- Asylum Notes, 1891
- Commitment of the insane, 1891
- Electro-Therapeutical Notes, 1892
- Murray Royal Academy, Perth, Scotland, 1892
- Franklinization as a Therapeutic Measure in Neurasthenia, 1896
- The Expenditure of Electric Energy, 1898
- American Electro-Therapeutic Association, 1899
- The Rontgen ray and ultraviolet light in the treatment of malignant diseases of the uterus, with report of an inoperable case, 1902
- Radium: With a preliminary note on Radium rays in the treatment of cancer, 1903
- Light Energy: Its Physics, Physiological Action, and Therapeutic Applications, 1904
- The Autobiography of a Neurasthene: As Told By One of Them and Recorded by Margaret A. Cleaves, M.D., 1910
