= Alvah and Martha Frisbie =

Pioneer residents of Des Moines, Iowa

Alvah Lillie Frisbie
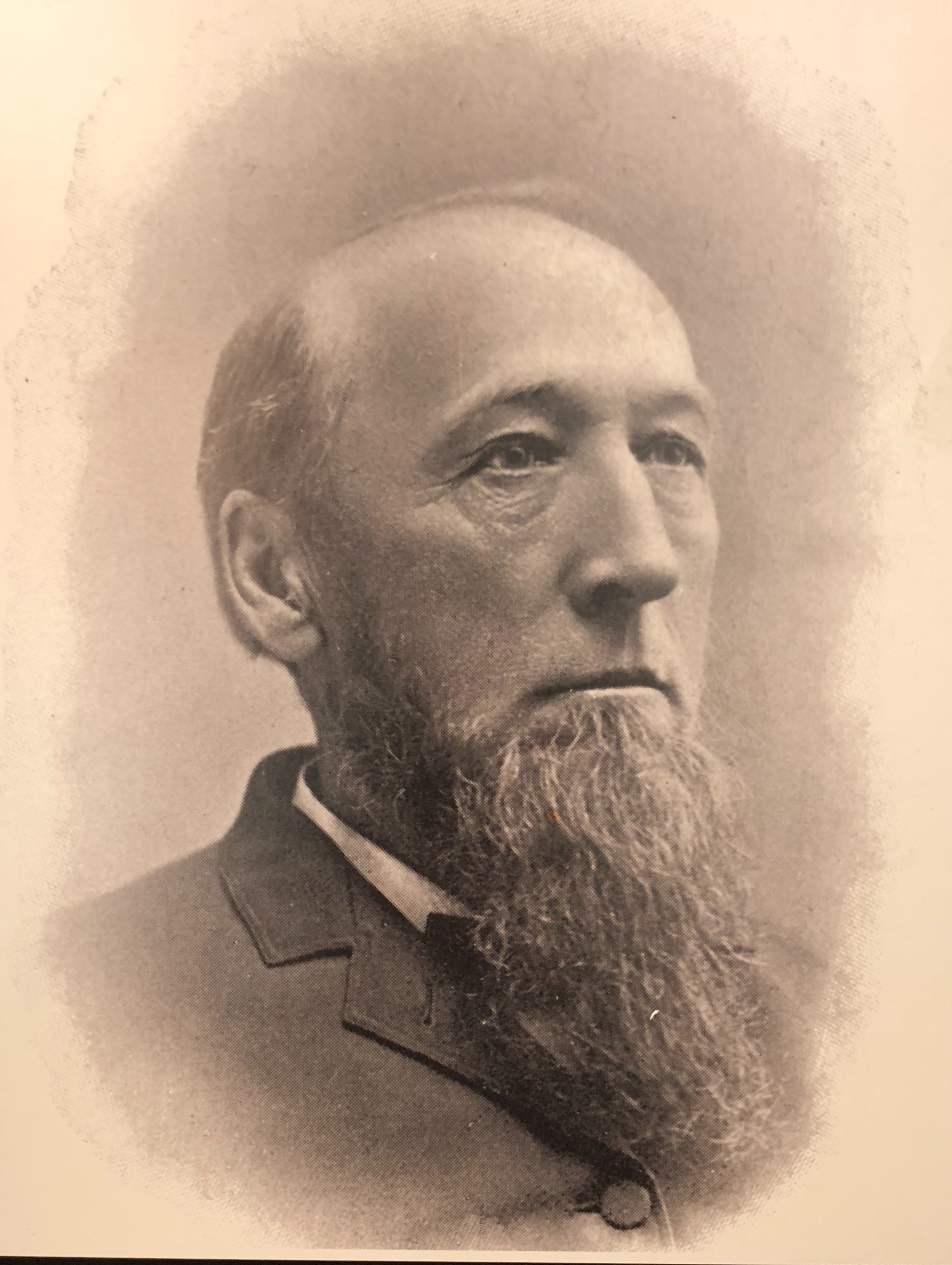
- Born: October 20, 1830; Tompkins County, New York, U.S.
- Died: December 17, 1917 (aged 87); Des Moines, Iowa
- Burial place: Woodland Cemetery, Des Moines, Iowa
- Occupation: Pastor
- Years active: 42
- Notable work: The Siege of Calais, Sermons in Verse

Martha Crosby Frisbie
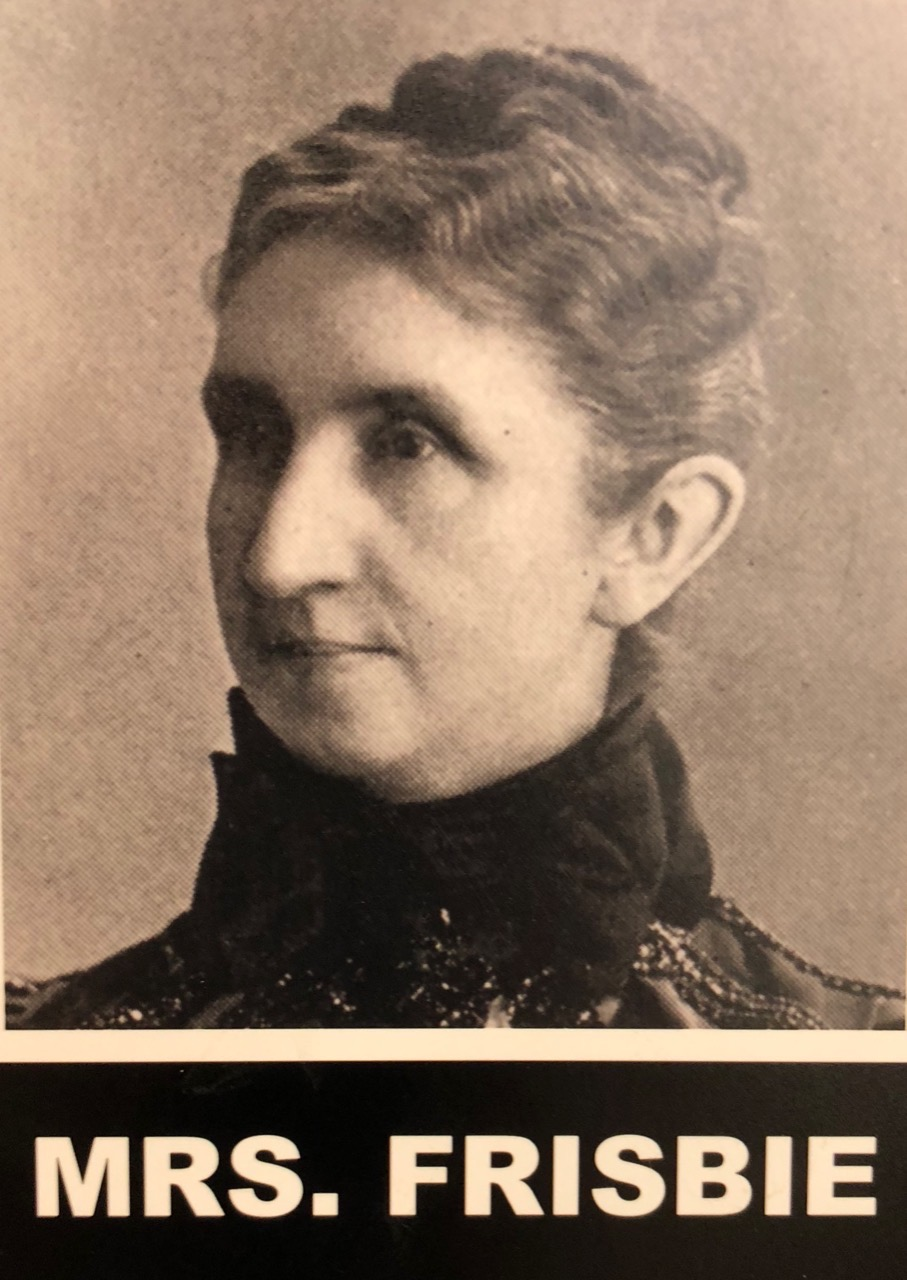
- Born: Martha C. Crosby; May 17, 1840; Danbury, Connecticut, U.S.
- Died: March 27, 1931 (aged 90); Des Moines, Iowa
- Occupation: Teacher

A. L. Frisbie was a pioneer minister at Plymouth Church in Des Moines, Iowa, from 1871 to 1899. After he retired, he served as Pastor Emeritus for a total of 42 years of service. Martha Frisbie was a teacher and leader in the Iowa Congregational Church. Frisbie Park in Des Moines and the former Frisbie Public School were named for them. The Frisbies were active abolitionists and suffrage advocates in Des Moines. He shepherded Plymouth Congregational Church during years of growth and building. She was a teacher and a leader in women’s organizations. Her former students formed the Frisbie Club, a study club which still exists today.

== Life ==
Alva L. Frisbie was born on October 22, 1830, in Tompkins County, New York. His father, Daniel Grand Frisbie, died when Alva was four years old. In August 1857, he graduated from Amherst College. On August 23, 1859, he married Jerusalem Slocomb. Their first child, Lillian Hope, was born in November 1860. In June 1863, a second daughter was born. In September 1863, he joined the 20th Regular Connecticut Volunteer Infantry as a chaplain. After serving as a chaplain during the American Civil War, he moved to Des Moines, Iowa in October 1871 to be the Pastor of Plymouth Congregational Church. On May 15, 1872, Jersha Frisbie died after giving birth to her daughter Ruth, who died in October of the same year. On July 29, 1873, Frisbie married Martha Crosby in Danbury, Connecticut.

During his time at Plymouth, he started four new congregations and built a new church building. After retiring from Plymouth Church in 1889, he continued to be active in public and religious life. In an article about his 75th birthday sermon, the Minneapolis Journal said, “He has married more Iowa couples and officiated at more Iowa funerals than any man living. Tho the active work of the pastorate is in other hands, he still performs almost all marriages..” He published a detailed history of the early church in 1904.

Frisbie was a well known writer of verse, including Sermons in Verse and The Siege of Calais, which was reviewed in the Des Moines Register in 1897. (obit Pioneer is Dead Des Moines Tribune (Des Moines, Iowa) · 18 Dec 1917, Tue · Page 2 ) He was a trustee of Iowa College now known as Grinnell College from 1885 through 1908. A scholarship was established in his name in 1908. He died December 17, 1917.

Martha Crosby Frisbie was born on May 17, 1840, in Danbury, Connecticut. She studied at Mt. Holyoke Seminary and then taught for four years at Temple Grove Seminary, a boarding school for women in Saratoga Springs, New York. The school closed during the Civil War and eventually became Skidmore College. She married Alva L. Frisbie in 1873 and moved to Des Moines, Iowa, after his first wife died. Frisbie had three young children when he remarried. She and Alva Frisbie had two children. After moving to Des Moines, she taught at Callanan College in Des Moines for seven years and instructed women in her home with private classes. “She dexterously arranged her household and teaching responsibilities to accompany Dr. Frisbie when making calls on his parishioners.” She taught Bible classes for young women at Plymouth Church for 35 years.

Martha Frisbie was a member of Des Moines Women’s Club and presented many speeches on literature and religion. She was very active in the Board of Missions of the Congregational Church spending 17 years as president of the Grinnell association and eleven years as president of the Iowa association. She died at age 90 on March 27, 1931, and is buried with her husband in Woodland Cemetery, Des Moines.

== Frisbie Park ==
Frisbie Park, named after the Frisbies, is located at 6101 Muskogee Avenue in Des Moines, and the park also gives its name to Frisbie Park Neighborhood.

== Frisbie School ==
Frisbie School was also named after the Frisbies. It opened in 1914 and served a small population of Des Moines and West Des Moines students in a sparsely populated area on the west side of Des Moines, located at 60th and Muskogee. “Until a levee was built to hold back the Raccoon River, the school was bothered with floods. One year water came to the first floor of the building. In the Spring of 1965, water completely surrounded the building for a few days. Cars were parked several blocks away, and pupils and teachers waded through about six inches of water. School was held each day.” With the opening of a new addition to Hanawalt School in 1972, Frisbie School was closed and later demolished. Mrs. Frisbie visited the school in 1921 and gave the school its Motto: “Fight for your best”

== Adeline and Frisbie Clubs ==
Both the Adeline and the Frisbie clubs were formed by former Sunday School classes at Plymouth Church. The Adeline Club was formed in 1900 and named for their late teacher, Adeline McFarland. The Frisbie Club was formed in 1903 and named in honor of Rev. and Mrs. Frisbie. Both groups met fortnightly and later combined. The Frisbie Club still meets today in Des Moines.
