= Henry Wallace House =

Historic house in Iowa, United States

- U.S. National Register of Historic Places
- U.S. Historic district – Contributing property
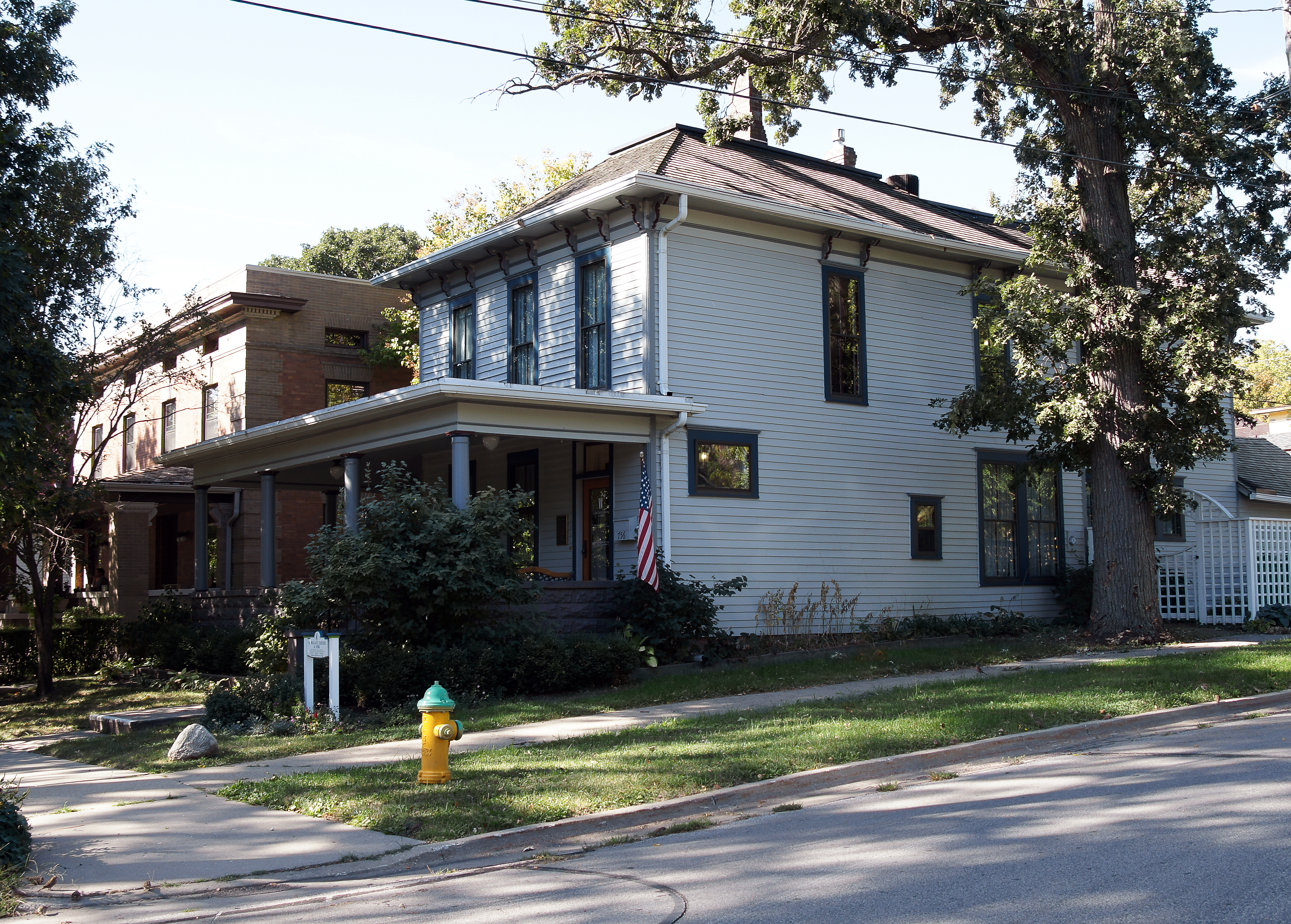

- Location within Iowa Location within the United States
- Interactive map showing the location of Henry Wallace House
- Location: 756 16th St. Des Moines, Iowa
- Coordinates: 41°35′29.5″N 93°38′21.3″W
- Built: 1883
- Architectural style: Late Victorian
- Part of: Sherman Hill Historic District (ID88001168)
- NRHP reference No.: 93000412
- Added to NRHP: May 14, 1993

The Henry Wallace House is an historic building located in Des Moines, Iowa, United States. It was the home of Henry Wallace, who was an advocate for agricultural improvement and reform. The house was listed on the National Register of Historic Places as a contributing property in the Sherman Hill Historic District in 1979 and it has been individually listed since 1993.

== History ==
Henry Wallace was a Presbyterian minister who moved to Iowa in 1862 with his wife Nancy and their daughter Josephine when Henry became editor of the Iowa Homestead. He was an advocate for agricultural improvement and reform. With his sons Henry C. and John, he founded Wallace's Farm and Dairy, which became a major national publication named Wallace's Farmer. He was involved with the establishment of Iowa State College, now Iowa State University, as a premier agricultural research institution. Wallace was asked to serve as U.S. Secretary of Agriculture, but he deferred to his friend James "Tama Jim" Wilson. Nancy died in 1909 and Henry died in 1916. His son Henry became Secretary of Agriculture and his grandson, Henry A. Wallace, was Secretary of Agriculture, Secretary of Commerce and U.S. Vice President.

The Wallace's moved into this house on the corner of 16th and Center Streets when they moved to Des Moines in 1892. Josephine continued to live in the house until 1923. The Wallace family continued to own the house until 1940. By the 1950s the house was divided into 11 apartments and continued to serve this purpose until the early 1970s. In the 70's it was purchased by Guy L. Roberts, Jr. who began to restore and return the home to a single family building. Ultimately he sold the home to The Wallace House Foundation in late 1988. The Wallace House Foundation was established in 1988 to purchase and restore the home. In 2000 a 100-year-old oak tree on the north side of the Wallace House was named Iowa's Millennium Tree. The garden was redesigned in 2008. The house is now owned by The Wallace Centers of Iowa who maintain it as a house museum and for its own purposes.

== Architecture ==
The house was built in 1883 in the Victorian-Italianate style. It features a wrap-around porch, stacked bay windows and a second story balcony. The Wallace's altered the third floor around 1895 adding two bedrooms and a hybrid mansard/hip roof and dormer windows.

The restoration of the house in the late 20th century was guided by photographs taken by Josephine Wallace. Architect William Wagner, who specializes in historic preservation, developed restoration plans to bring the house back to its original floor plan. It was altered somewhat to allow for the building's multiple uses as a museum, office space and meeting facility. The Wallace family donated period furniture and historic mementoes to be displayed in the house. The portraits of Henry and Nancy Wallace are original to the house.

== See also ==
The following properties are associated with the Wallace family and are all listed on the National Register of Historic Places:

- Catalpa, a farm located southeast of Greenfield, Iowa
- Henry C. Wallace House in Winterset, Iowa
