= Ida L. Cummins =

19th and 20th-century American women's and children's rights activist

Ida Lucerne Cummins
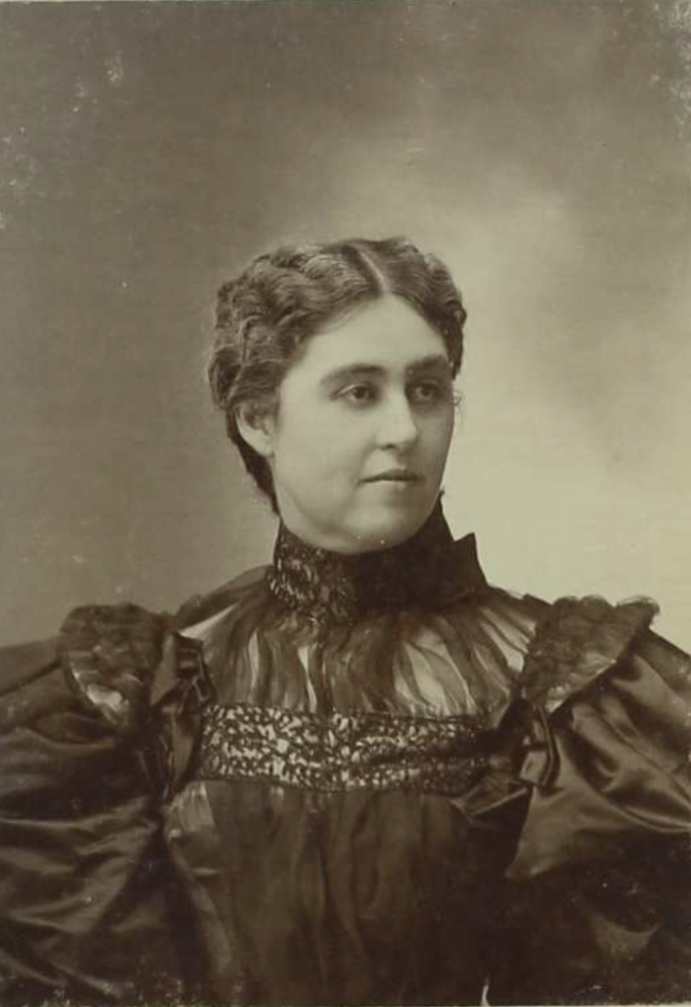

First Lady of Iowa
- In office January 16, 1902 – November 24, 1908
- Preceded by: Alice Crenshaw Shaw
- Succeeded by: Clara Clark Garst

Personal details
- Born: Ida Lucerne Gallery; August 15, 1853 Eaton County, Michigan, U.S.
- Died: February 27, 1918 (aged 64) Washington, D.C., U.S.
- Resting place: Woodland Cemetery, Des Moines, IA
- Known for: Women's suffrage; women's rights; Children's Rights

Ida L. Cummins (August 15, 1853 – February 27, 1918) was a women's rights and children's rights activist living in Des Moines, Iowa and Washington, D.C. She was the wife of Albert B. Cummins, three term governor of the state of Iowa and U.S. Senator for Iowa for 18 years. She was active in the Des Moines Women's Club and served as the 10th president from 1895 to 1896. She and her husband were also active speakers and proponents of Women's Suffrage in Iowa hosting suffrage events in their home. She was president of the National Society Children of the American Revolution.

In an article about the new first lady of Iowa, the Champaign Daily Gazette said: "She has been a leader among women in many charitable works and combines with a charming personality quite and extensive popularity. Mrs. Cummins is one of the handsomest matrons of Des Moines. She is a leader in intellectual and charitable circles, having served as president of the Des Moines Women's Club and being at this time president of the board of managers of the Home for Friendless children." Mrs. Cummins was also an active and influential member of Plymouth Congregational Church in Des Moines, Iowa

According to her obituary: "Mrs. Cummins was active in Des Moines and in Washington in the interest of child welfare. She, more than any one person to Iowa, was responsible for the Iowa child labor law. Mrs. Cummins was president of the Des Moines Home for the Friendless Children for a number of years prior to her removal to Washington. She was retained as honorary president, and whenever in Des Moines devoted her time to the affairs in the home."

After her death, the Des Moines Women's Club and the Des Moines Public Library and librarian Forrest Spaulding established a special memorial collection named for her which contained books on history, world politics, and literature. When her husband, Senator Cummins heard that the collection would be established he said: “The idea is a noble, beautiful conception and I shall never cease to be grateful to you and your association for the proposal. I have a library of nearly 5000 volumes, partially in my Des Moines home and here in Washington. When you are ready to make the collection will you not go into my library and make such selections as you think will be appropriate?" The collection is still maintained in the special collections room of the Des Moines Public Library today.
