= Martha Callanan =

19th and 20th-century American women's suffragist activist

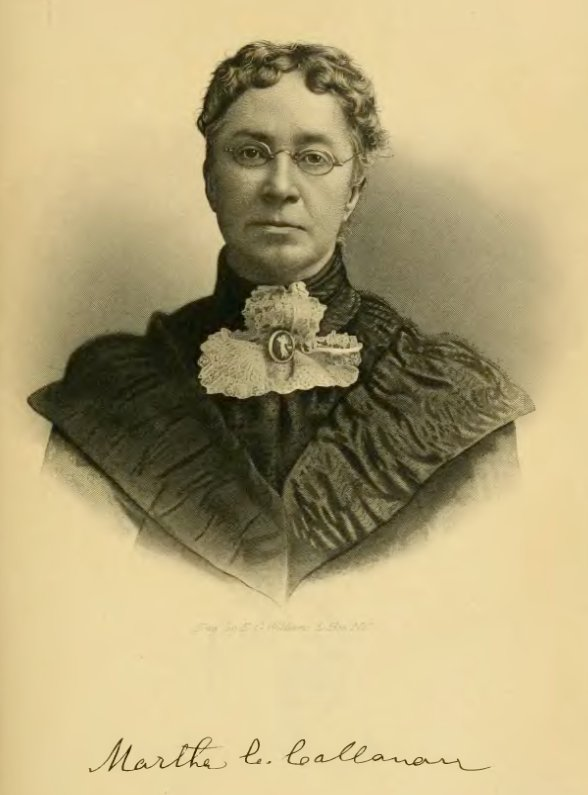
- Born: Martha Coonley; May 18, 1826; Albany County, New York, U.S.
- Died: August 16, 1901 (aged 75); Des Moines, Iowa, U.S.
- Resting place: Woodland Cemetery, Des Moines, IA
- Known for: Women's suffrage; women's rights; Children's Rights

Martha Callanan (1826-1901) was a woman's suffrage advocate, newspaper publisher and philanthropist. She was born in Albany County New York and moved to Des Moines, Iowa with her husband James C. Callanan in 1863 and her home soom became the unofficial headquarters for the local women's suffrage movement.

In 1870 Callanan became a charter member and president of the Polk County Woman Suffrage Association. When Susan B Anthony and Elizabeth Cady Stanton visited Des Moines, they stayed at the Callanan home. In 1876 she was elected president of the Iowa Women's Suffrage Association succeeding her husband James Callanan. She served in that position for four terms. She was editor of The Standard, a suffrage paper published in Iowa.

Callanan was also active in the Woman's Christian Temperance Union and was one of the founders of the Home for the Aged in Des Moines (which was renamed the Martha Callanan Home after her death). She was the second president of the Des Moines Women's Club.

Callanan suffered an accidental death in 1901 after her carriage overturned. Her will bequeathed $20,000 (equivalent to $755,920 in 2024) to the Tuskegee Institute, which she had developed an interest in following a cross-county lecture tour by Booker T. Washington.
