= Sherman Hill Historic District =

Historic district in Iowa, United States

- U.S. National Register of Historic Places
- U.S. Historic district
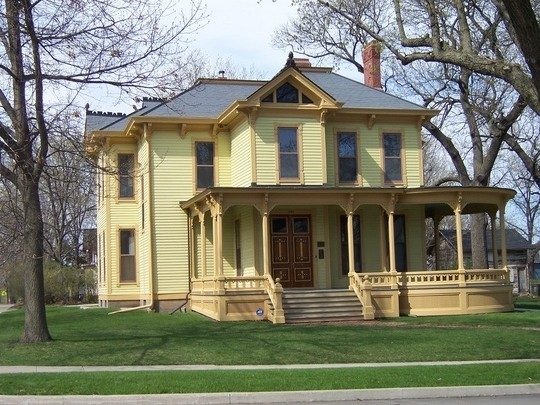
- 1623 Center Street (1884)

- Location within Iowa Location within the United States
- Location: Roughly bounded by Woodland Ave., 19th, School, and 15th Sts. Des Moines, Iowa
- Coordinates: 41°35′28″N 93°38′25″W
- Area: 80 acres (32 ha)
- Architectural style: Late Victorian
- NRHP reference No.: 79000926 (original); 12000063 (increase)

Significant dates
- Added to NRHP: January 25, 1979
- Boundary increase: March 7, 2012

The Sherman Hill Historic District is located in Des Moines, Iowa, United States. It is one of the oldest residential neighborhoods in Des Moines. Single-family houses were constructed beginning around 1880 and multi-family dwellings were built between 1900 and 1920. The district encompasses 80 acres (32 ha) and 210 buildings and is bounded by 15th Street to the east, High Street to the south, Martin Luther King Parkway on the west, and School Street to the north. The historic district has been listed on the National Register of Historic Places since 1979.

== History ==
Sherman Hill took its name in the early 1970s, borrowed from the name of Hoyt Sherman Place, which is located in the southeast part of the neighborhood. In the early 1870s, Des Moines banker Hoyt Sherman built his brick "palazzo" on a hill overlooking the city center. He was followed by local developers such as Talmadge Brown, James Savery and W.C. Burton who laid out streets and lots in the first of seven subdivisions which now encompasses the district. The forty years of development saw the construction of late Victorian mansions, simple hipped box houses, the gable-roofed vernacular houses and small cottages. After 1900 multi-family apartment buildings were built in the district. It has the highest concentration of residential architecture from the late 19th-century and the early 20th-century in Des Moines. Given the range of architecture and houses sizes it has also contained a variety of income levels over the years.

The various architectural designs in Sherman Hill were set by the end of World War I. Over the following 30 to 35 years the housing stock began to deteriorate, and the wealthier residents began to move to the newer suburban districts to the south and west. At the same time, the population in the district increased as the larger homes were converted from single-family to multi-family dwellings. By the mid-20th century, the neighborhood had become blighted with abandoned and condemned housing. The early 1960s saw the construction of cheap, unaesthetic apartment complexes. The pace of deterioration slowed somewhat in the late 20th century as the city, neighborhood residents and newcomers took an interest in historic preservation.

The most prosperous years of Sherman Hill were from about 1880 to just after 1900 when a variety of prominent Des Moines businessmen choose to live in the area. Hoyt Sherman, a lawyer, banker, and local politician was joined by insurance executive Henry Scholte Nollen (664-18th) whose grandfather founded the Dutch community of Pella, Iowa. Real estate developer Samuel Saucerman (1510 Center) who was responsible for developing a portion of the city northwest of Drake University. Prominent members of Des Moines’ Jewish community moved to the district around the turn of the 20th century. They tended to live along 18th Street and Woodland Avenue, and they included Aaron Younker (823-18th), who with his brothers developed the Younkers department store chain. Other professionals who lived here included Lafayette Young (822-18th), who was the publisher of the Des Moines Capital, one of the city's major newspapers at the time; Robert S. Finkbine (808-19th) who was the Superintendent of Construction for the Iowa State Capitol and T. Fred Henry (1701 Woodland), a locally-known African American musician and the leader of T.F. Henry's Band. Henry Wallace (756-16th) lived in Sherman Hill from about 1893 to 1910. He was an advocate for agricultural improvement and reform, edited the Homestead and, with his sons, founded Wallace's Farm and Dairy, which became a major national publication named Wallace's Farmer. His son was U.S. Secretary of Agriculture Henry C. Wallace and his grandson was Secretary of Agriculture, Secretary of Commerce and U.S. Vice President Henry A. Wallace.

== Architecture ==
Sherman Hill is a 15 block area northwest of downtown Des Moines. It is mostly a residential area with two clusters of commercial buildings, one on the northwest corner and another along its southern border. The streets follow a grid pattern that is oriented north to south. The elevation of the district varies as do the sizes of the lots. There is an abundance of trees, but no public spaces.

Houses built in the 1880s and the early 1890s were of either brick or frame construction. After the turn of the 20th-century brick was used primarily for commercial or apartment building construction. There are only two examples of brick houses from this period. Architectural styles of the larger houses in the district include French Château, vernacular Italianate, Queen Anne and Eastlake. There are also three Victorian Italianate row houses that were built in 1887. Many of the houses do not exhibit a definitive architectural style. Instead, they are classified by size, form and roof shape. These included houses known as the hipped box, gabled-roofed and cottages.

The apartment buildings built in the first two decades of the 20th century are three or more stories tall. They feature a simple, rectilinear form with flat fronts. Details are concentrated at the doorways, cornices and windows. There are several double houses, which date from the same period. They are similar in design with the apartment buildings, although many have projecting window bays. All of the double houses are two stories high, and many feature front porches.

There is also a church in the northwest corner of the district, Kingsway Cathedral. It was designed by the Des Moines architectural firm of Proudfoot, Bird and Rawson and was built in 1901. The Gothic Revival style building features a crenellated corner tower.

== Contributing Properties ==
- The Lexington
- Hoyt Sherman Place
- Henry Wallace House
- Lua Brewing

== See also ==
- Sherman Historic District
