= Woodland Place Historic District =

Historic district in Iowa, United States

- U.S. National Register of Historic Places
- U.S. Historic district
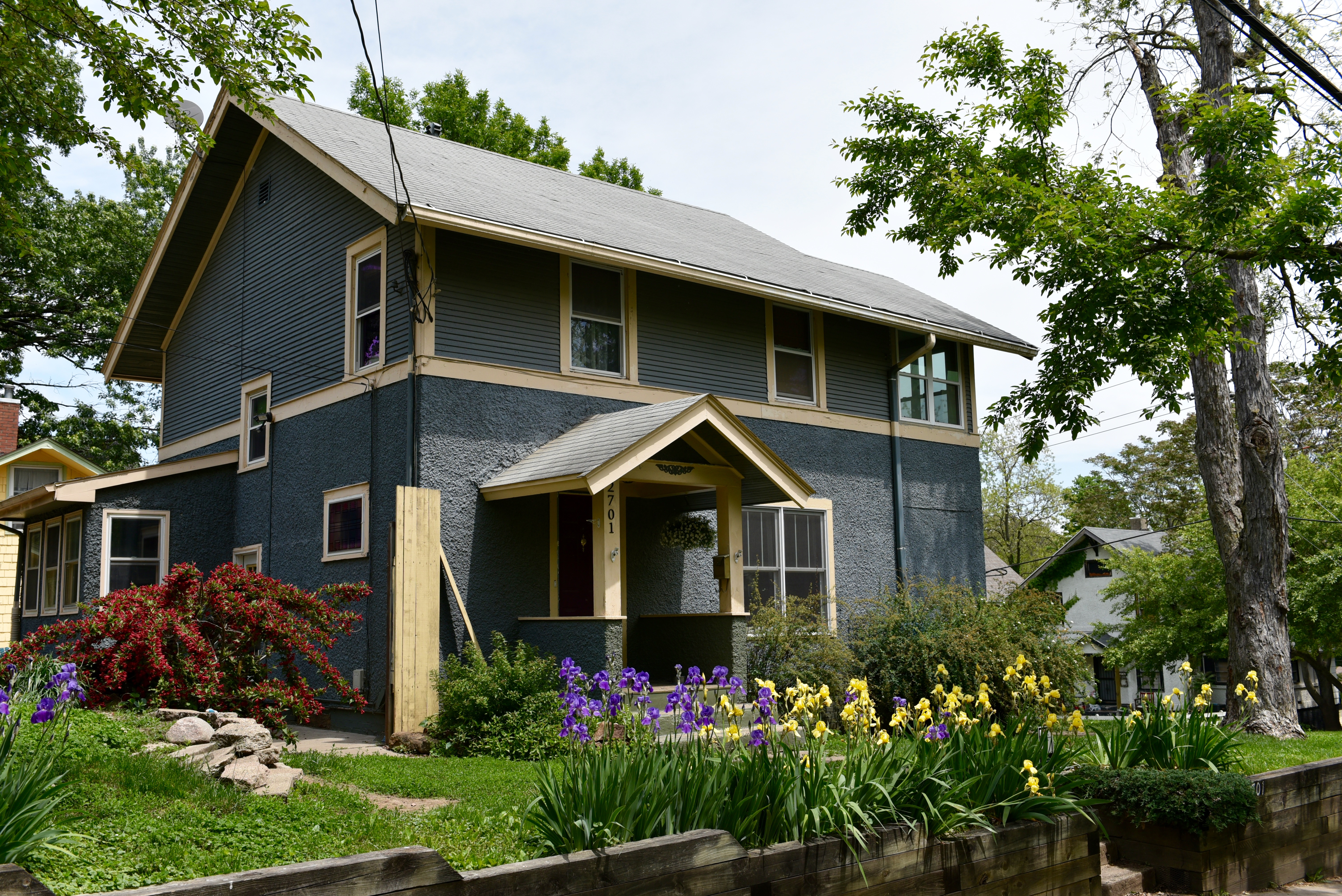
- A house on Woodlawn Avenue within the district.

- Location within Iowa Location within the United States
- Location: 25th to 27th St. to Woodland Ave. Des Moines, Iowa
- Coordinates: 41°35′24″N 93°39′06″W
- Area: 33.38 acres (13.51 ha)
- Architect: Harry Taylor; Henry Pharmer
- Architectural style: Bungalow; American Craftsman
- MPS: The Bungalow and Square House--Des Moines Residential Growth and Development MPS
- NRHP reference No.: 00000927
- Added to NRHP: November 21, 2000

The Woodland Place Historic District is located on the west side of Des Moines, Iowa, United States. The houses in the district are primarily bungalows and square houses. It has been listed on the National Register of Historic Places since 2000.

== History ==
Percival-Porter and Company had Woodland Place platted in June 1907 and Ellen F. Whitman, the landowner, had it officially recorded on July 5, 1907. The plat was composed of six rectangular blocks with 138 numbered lots that measured 50 feet (15 m) by 132 feet (40 m). There was little in the way of development in the plat until 1910 when Des Moines real estate developer Henry H. Pharmer secured 19 lots in 1910 and 1911 in the northwest quarter of the plat. He also had a dozen showcase bungalows built in 1910. Percival and Porter offered 27 newly built houses for sale during the first half of June 1910, although records indicate only ten were built. Some of these houses could have been those built by Pharmer. What makes this situation unique in Des Moines is that the developers were offering completed houses for sale, rather than empty lots. The houses were being offered for $3,500. It required a down payment of $350 and a monthly payment of $35. The houses that Percival-Porter offered were seven room, square houses. Many of the people who bought land and had their own homes built chose to build bungalows. Harry Taylor was responsible for the houses that were built around 1920. He purchased the lots from the United Investment Company and several realtors. These lots were also in the northern part of the plat, right below Pharmers’.

The residents of Woodland Place organized early on in its existence. Mrs. Raymond A. Bullard organized the "Woodland Neighbors" in early 1911. It was a woman's group who goals were social interaction in order to develop lasting friendships. Around the same time the "Woodland Boosters" were organized to promote "sidewalk, paving, and other improvements and in a general way to enlist the interest of the people of that section in the city beautiful movement." The "Woodland Place Improvement Club" was organized in mid-1912. Its accomplishments included having 27th Street lowered by as much as 12 feet (4 m), as well as ensuring the safety of the residents.
