= Hoyt Sherman Place =

Theater and House Museum in Des Moines, Iowa

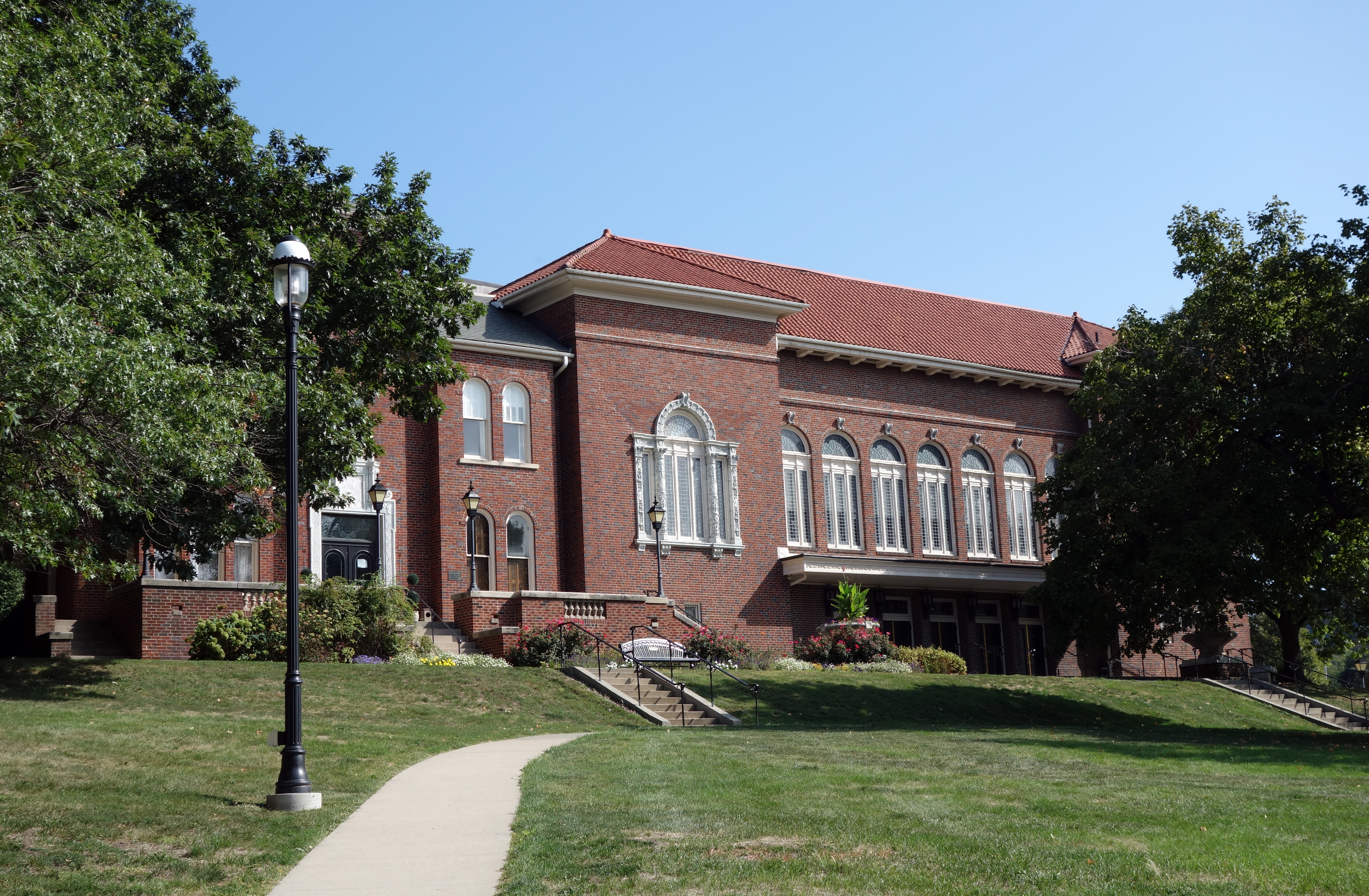
- Interactive map of Hoyt Sherman Place
- Address: 1501 Woodland Avenue
- Location: Des Moines, Iowa, United States
- Owner: Hoyt Sherman Place Foundation
- Capacity: 1,252 Theater Capacity
- Type: Theater/Museum//Historic House

Construction
- Built: 1877
- Opened: 1907
- Renovated: 2000–2003, 2019-2021

Website
- www.hoytsherman.org
- Hoyt Sherman Place
- U.S. National Register of Historic Places
- U.S. Historic district – Contributing property
- Location within Iowa Location within the United States
- Coordinates: 41°35′19″N 93°38′18″W
- Area: 1.3 acres (0.53 ha)
- Built: 1877
- Architect: Kraetsen Vorse & Kraetsch
- Architectural style: Late Victorian
- Part of: Sherman Hill Historic District (ID88001168)
- NRHP reference No.: 77000552
- Added to NRHP: September 19, 1977

Hoyt Sherman Place is a house and museum located in Des Moines, Iowa. Built in 1877, the house was the home of banker and politician Hoyt Sherman.

== History ==
In 1850, Hoyt Sherman purchased five acres of land in Des Moines for $105. In 1877, Hoyt Sherman Place, the family home, was completed with the help of William Foster, an Iowa architect. Almost immediately, it is noted in writings to be, "a society showplace of the grandest scale." Among its distinguished guests are General William Tecumseh Sherman, brother of Hoyt, General Ulysses S. Grant, General Philip Sheridan, and Major William McKinley.

Hoyt Sherman had moved to Fort Des Moines, IA, at the age of 21, in 1848, when Fort Des Moines was then a frontier town. Sherman, a lawyer, and later was appointed the city's postmaster by President Zachary Taylor. During the Civil War, President Abraham Lincoln appointed him as an Army Paymaster with the rank of major.

Sherman was involved in the formation of the Equitable of Iowa Insurance Company, the Des Moines school system, the waterworks system and other essential facilities.

Sherman and his wife, Sara, raised five children, Frank, Addie, Charles, Arthur, and Helen, in the home. Major Hoyt Sherman died in January 1904.

In 1893, The Sisters of Mercy, from Davenport, Iowa, rented the home and created the first Mercy Hospital. It held 52 beds and operated for nearly two years.

The Des Moines Sherman Hill neighborhood is named after Hoyt Sherman Place.

The house was added to the National Register of Historic Places in 1977.

== Theater ==
The original theater was built in 1923. In 2004, a major theater restoration project took place. The historic theater has seating available for 1,252 guests. Some of the major acts that have performed at the Hoyt Sherman Place Theater include: Dwight Yoakam, Dave Chappelle, Martina McBride, and David Sedaris.

In 2015, Hoyt Sherman Place was inducted into the Iowa Rock 'n' Roll Hall of Fame for its continuance as a venue for musicians to perform. It is also known for its history of presenting music to the masses.

== Art Gallery ==
In 1885 the Des Moines Women’s Club decided to create an art collection in the city of Des Moines was a top priority. The first piece they purchased was a bronze statue of Joan of Arc at the Chicago World's Fair, World's Columbian Exposition in 1893. This piece is still on display at Hoyt Sherman Place. The collection continued to grow with purchases from the Women's Club as well as a large donation of art and artifacts from Major S.H.M. Byers, author of The Song of Iowa and Sherman's March to the Sea and his wife, Margaret, in 1912, as well as other generous donors from the Des Moines area. The majority of these works are still on display in the Hoyt Sherman Place Gallery. Some of the paintings are attributed to well-known artists such as Otto van Veen, Robert Reid (American Painter), Edwin Lord Weeks and Andrea del Verrocchio.

== Renovation and Addition ==
The full restoration of the upper level of the mansion was completed in 2021. The COVID-19 shutdown allowed for the time needed to restore the second floor to the original floorplan including Hoyt and Sara Sherman's bedroom as well as their daughter, Helen Sherman's bedroom. Their daughter, Helen Sherman Griffith was born and raised in the Sherman home and as an adult became a well-known author of children's books.

The rooms have been restored top to bottom including period-appropriate lighting fixtures, paint, flooring and décor.

The Center for Artists and Education was completed in 2020. It includes classroom and rehearsal spaces as well as modern dressing rooms, loading dock, administrative offices and additional event spaces.

== Des Moines Women's Club ==
In 1907, Hoyt Sherman Place became the clubhouse of the Des Moines Women’s Club. The Club added an art gallery, the first public art museum in the city. In 1923, a 1400-seat auditorium was completed for Club programs.

In 1995, the Hoyt Sherman Place Foundation was created to provide long-term care and protection of the home and collection as well as run the day-to-day operations. The Women's Club continues to meet at the historic home and contribute to its ongoing success. In 1995, the Hoyt Sherman Place Foundation was founded by the Des Moines Women's Club and Des Moines government officials. Ownership of the house and all art and artifacts contained in it were given to the Foundation by the Des Moines Women's Club. The club also provided an endowment, which was increased by the sale of the painting To the Memory of Cole by Frederic Edwin Church. In 2017, the Hoyt Sherman Place Foundation completed restoration of all major paintings in the collection.
