= Iowa Women's Hall of Fame =

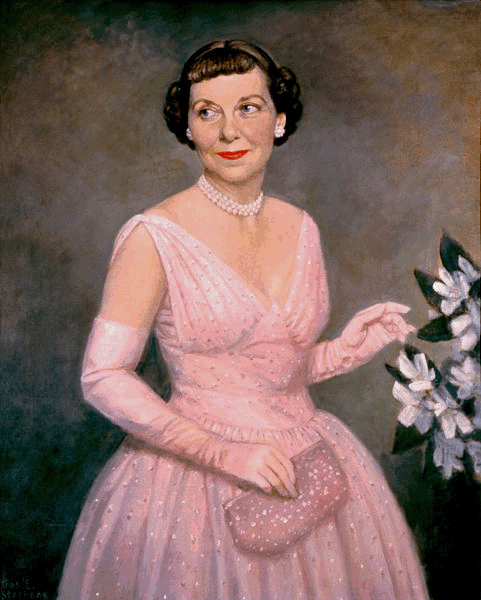
Mamie Eisenhower First Lady of the United States January 20, 1953 – January 20, 1961

The Iowa Women's Hall of Fame was created to acknowledge the accomplishments of female role models associated with the U.S. state of Iowa, and is an endeavor of the Iowa Commission on the Status of Women (ICSW).

== History ==
In 1972, the state of Iowa created the ICSW to oversee women's issues, with Cristine Swanson Wilson as its first chair. Since the Hall of Fame's beginnings in 1975, four annual nominees are inducted by the ICSW and the Governor of Iowa in a public ceremony. The event is held on Women's Equality Day, which commemorates the August 26, 1920, ratification of the Nineteenth Amendment to the United States Constitution that gave women the right to vote. The honorees are nominated by the public via online forms available on the ICSW website. The ICSW also created the annual "Cristine Wilson Medal for Equality and Justice" in 1982. Wilson was inducted into the Hall of Fame in 1989.

The initial inductees were Iowa's first female Secretary of State Ola Babcock Miller, who created the Iowa State Patrol; president and founding member of Iowa Woman Suffrage Association, Amelia Bloomer; president of the National American Woman Suffrage Association, and founder of the League of Women Voters, Carrie Chapman Catt; and Annie Turner Wittenmyer who founded the Women's Christian Temperance Union, formed an aid society to support Union Army soldiers during the Civil War, as well as helped to pass pension legislation for nurses in that same war. Catt was the first inductee.

In the ensuing years, the Hall of Fame ranks were joined by women from all walks of life. As of the 2017 inductee ceremonies, there have been 172 women inducted. The list of inductees includes civil rights pioneers, global issues leaders, community volunteer workers, elected officials, artists, the medical profession and a large cornucopia of contributions by the state's women. Two First Ladies of the United States, Lou Henry Hoover and Mamie Eisenhower were added in 1987 and 1993 respectively. Environmental preservationist Gladys B. Black made the list in 1985. Mycologist Lois Hattery Tiffany was added in 1991 for her career of educating the public about mushrooms. The military is represented by Women's Army Corps veteran Rosa Cunningham in 1980 and by former United States Army Judge Advocate General officer Phyllis Propp Fowle in 2001. Vietnam War era anti-war activist Peg Mullen was inducted in 1997. Pulitzer Prize winner Susan Glaspell was a 1976 inductee. Hualing Nieh Engle, who in 1976 was co-nominated for the Nobel Peace Prize, became a Hall of Fame inductee in 2008. Cattle breeder Mary Garst was added in 1981. Several women farmers are on the list, and added in 2001 was attorney Phyllis Josephine Hughes who had also been honored by Pope John Paul II for her legal assistance to the farm community.

== Inductees ==
Iowa Women's Hall of Fame
Name	Image	Birth–Death	Year	Area of achievement	Ref(s)
Romonda D. Belcher		(b. 1968)	2023	District Associate Judge	
Paula S. Dierenfeld		(b. 1954)	2023	Mayor of Johnston, Iowa	
Bridget D. Reed		(b. 1977)	2023	Registered nurse	
Elizabeth Bates Cowles		(1900–1976)	2022	Civic activist	
Mary Elaine Richards		(b. 1936)	2022	County attorney, activist	
Laurie Schipper		(b. 1962)	2022	Executive director of the Iowa Coalition Against Domestic Violence	
Mary Swander		(b. 1950)	2022	2009-2019 Poet Laureate of Iowa	
Cornelia Clarke		(1884–1936)	2021	Nature photographer, academic contributor, book illustrator	
Jan Mitchell			2021	Educator, 35-year veteran of the Marshalltown Community School District	
Donna Reed		(1921–1986)	2021	Actress, 1953 Academy Award for Best Supporting Actress	
Roxann Marie Ryan		(b. 1955)	2021	Iowa Commissioner of Public Safety, Assistant Iowa Attorney General	
Mark Cady		(1953–2019)	2020	Chief Justice, Iowa Supreme Court from 2011 to 2019, wrote the Varnum v. Brien opinion that legalized same-sex marriage in Iowa in 2009.	
Betty Jean Dillavou Durden		(1923–2017)	2020	WWII WAVES US Navy veteran, one of the founders of the Iowa Commission on the Status of Women	
Ann Fry Jorgensen		(b. 1939/1940)	2020	Agriculture	
Helen Miller		(b. 1945)	2020	Former Iowa State Representative	
Mary Elizabeth Young Bear		(b. 1959)	2020	Meskwaki native American birth name "Bo na bi go". Artist and art conservator, educator, cultural historian, civic leader and political activist, humanitarian, community leader and mentor	
Ruth B. Klotz		(1922–2020)	2019	Attorney, first probate judge in the State of Iowa in 1978; former Special Counsel to the Iowa Department of Revenue	
Mona Kadel Martin		(b. 1934)	2019	Iowa House of Representatives	
Ione Genevieve Shadduck		(1923–2022)	2019	Founding member of both the Iowa Women Attorneys Association and the Iowa Women's Political Caucus; member of the Governor's Committee to remove sexism from the Iowa Code	
Florine Mary Schulte Swanson		(b. 1942)	2019	Teacher, coach, organizer	
Dianne G. Bystrom		(b. 1953)	2018	Director of Carrie Chapman Catt Center for Women and Politics at Iowa State University	
Ruth Harkin		(b. 1944)	2018	Harkin Institute for Public Policy and Citizen Engagement at Drake University	
Jean Y. Jew		(b. 1948)	2018	University of Iowa’s College of Medicine. Won a landmark harassment legal case against the University of Iowa. Jean Y. Jew Human Rights Award named in her honor.	
Peggy Whitson		(b. 1960)	2018	Astronaut	
Jane Boyd		(1869–1932)	2017	Social worker, namesake of the Jane Boyd Organization	
Joni Ernst		(b. 1970)	2017	United States Senator from Iowa	
Christine Hensley		(b. 1949)	2017	Des Moines City Council	
Kim Reynolds		(b. 1959)	2017	Governor of Iowa	
Grace Amemiya		(1920–2017)	2016	Nurse	
Angela Connolly		(b. 1952)	2016	Polk County Board of Supervisors	
Michele Devlin			2016	Professor of Global Public Health and Chair of the Division of Health Promotion and Education at the University of Northern Iowa and Director of the Iowa Center on Health Disparities	
Viola Gibson		(1905–1989)	2016	Founder of Cedar Rapids Branch of the National Association for the Advancement of Colored People (NAACP)	
Joyce Boone Chapman			2015	First female president of the West Des Moines Chamber of Commerce, the West Des Moines Development Corp. and Rotary Club of Des Moines Foundation. The first female executive vice president at West Bank, director of West Bank since 1975.	
Michelle D. Johnson		(b. 1959)	2015	Lt. General and superintendent of the United States Department of Defense Service Academy, the first woman to serve in that position	
Linda K. Neuman		(b. 1948)	2015	Justice of the Iowa Supreme Court	
Marsha Ternus		(b. 1951)	2015	Justice of the Iowa Supreme Court	
Renee Hardman		(b. 1961)	2014	Owner of the human resources business Hardman Consulting	
Mary O'Keefe		(b. 1956)	2014	Former vice president and marketing chief at Principal Financial Group	
Maggie Tinsman		(b. 1936)	2014	Former Iowa State Senator	
Christie Vilsack		(b. 1950)	2014	Literacy advocate and politician	
Mary Louise Sconiers Chapman		(b. 1948)	2013	First woman to be the executive dean at Des Moines Area Community College	
Patty Judge		(b. 1943)	2013	46th Lieutenant Governor of Iowa and Secretary of Agriculture for Iowa	
Barbara Marie Mack		(1952–2012)	2013	Journalism professor at Iowa State University; first female corporate secretary and general counsel for the Des Moines Register and Tribune	
Deborah Ann Turner		(1950–2024)	2013	First African American woman to be certified by the American Board of Obstetrics and Gynecology in gynecologic oncology	
Judith A. Conlin		(b. 1941)	2012	Educator and co-founder of the Iowa Women's Studies Association	
Teresa Marie Hernandez		(b. 1956)	2012	Director of the Chrysalis Foundation	
Nancy Dunkel		(b. 1955)	2011	Banking industry, mentor to women in business	
Jacqueline Easley McGhee		(b. 1957)	2011	Community activist	
Charlotte Bowers Nelson		(1931–2023)	2011	Civic leader	
Mildred Hope Fisher Wood		(1920–2014)	2011	Physician, learning disabilities	
Julia Addington		(1829–1875)	2010	Elected 1869 Superintendent of Schools in Mitchell County, first woman in Iowa elected to office	
Mary Lundby		(1948–2009)	2010	Iowa State Senator	
Ruby L. Sutton		(1932–2015)	2010	African American civil rights worker, community civic activist	
Charese Yanney		(b. 1949)	2010	Business woman, fund raiser and civic leader, helped launch Women's Power Lunch and Women United	
Linda K. Kerber		(b. 1940)	2009	Historian	
Mary E. Kramer		(b. 1935)	2009	Iowa State Senator	
Adeline Lavonne McCormick-Ohnemus		(1921–1996)	2009	Osteopath, rural doctor and county Medical Examiner	
Lyn Stinson		(b. 1937)	2009	Community activist	
Joan Urenn Axel		(b. 1943)	2008	Lawyer, civic leader; founding member of the Carrie Chapman Catt Center for Women in Politics	
Barbara Moorman Boatwright		(1924–2012)	2008	Worked to help women run for political office; helped bring global peacemakers to Iowa; Boatwright Political Action Award established in her name by the Iowa Association of Social Workers	
Hualing Nieh Engle		(1925–2024)	2008	Novelist, poet, nominated (with her husband) for the Nobel Peace Prize in 1976	
Marilyn A. Russell		(1932–2007)	2008	Executive Director of Visiting Nurses in Des Moines	
Ruth Ann Gaines		(b. 1947)	2007	Educator, created Sisters for Success mentoring program. Inductee of National Teachers Hall of Fame and Iowa African American Hall of Fame	
Emma J. Harvat		(1870–1949)	2007	Pioneer in government service; Emma J. Harvat and Mary E. Stach House is on the NRHP in Johnson County	
Ada Hayden		(1884–1950)	2007	Botanist who added 10,000 specimens to the state herbarium	
Connie Wimer		(b. 1932)	2007	Community leader, publisher, business woman	
Jeanette Eyerly		(1908–2008)	2006	Young adult fiction writer	
Christine Grant		(1936–2021)	2006	University of Iowa Athletics Hall of Fame, Athlete and athletic director, University of Iowa	
Dorothy Marion Bouleris Paul		(1927–2024)	2006	Human rights	
Margaret Wragg Sloss		(1901–1979)	2006	Veterinary medicine	
Johnie Wright Hammond		(b. 1932)	2005	Politician, civic leader	
Brenda LaBlanc		(1928–2020)	2005	Advocate for low-income needy	
Susan Schechter		(1946–2004)	2005	Social worker	
Jo Ann McIntose Zimmerman		(1936–2019)	2005	43rd Lieutenant Governor of Iowa	
Joy Cole Corning		(1932–2017)	2004	44th Lieutenant Governor of Iowa	
Mary Ann Evans		(b. 1939)	2004	Co-founder Iowa State University's International Women in Science and Engineering, and ISU Program for Women in Science and Engineering	
Ruth Cole Nash		(1922–2002)	2004	Social activist, patron of the arts	
Sally J. Pederson		(b. 1951)	2004	45th Lieutenant Governor of Iowa	
Diana L. Findley		(b. 1948)	2003	Established Iowa CareGivers Association	
May E. Francis		(1880–1968)	2003	Educator and author of Jim Bowie's Lost Mine	
Jean Hall Lloyd-Jones		(b. 1929)	2003	Iowa Senate, Iowa House of Representatives	
Margaret Mary Toomey		(b. 1937)	2003	Volunteerism	
Bonnie Campbell		(b. 1948)	2002	32nd Iowa Attorney General	
Sue Ellen Follon		(1942–1998)	2002	Executive director Iowa Commission on Status of Women	
Alice Yost Jordan		(1916–2012)	2002	Musical composer	
Shirley Ruedy		(b. 1936)	2002	Journalist	
Ursula Delworth		(1934–2000)	2001	Psychologist, academician	
Phyllis L. Propp Fowle		(1908–2000)	2001	First female in the United States Army to serve as an officer with the Judge Advocate General, and the only female in that position deployed overseas in World War II	
Phyllis Josephine Hughes		(1912–2005)	2001	Honored by Pope John Paul II for legal aid to farmers; Democratic Party activist; novelist	
Ann Dearing Holtgren Pellegreno		(b. 1937)	2001	Musician	
Betty Jean "Beje" Walker Clark		(1920–2005)	2000	Public service, Beje Clark Residential Center bears her name	
Denise O'Brien		(b. 1949)	2000	Organic farmer; founder of Women, Food and Agriculture Network, represented farmers at the United Nations, serves on many coalitions representing rural women	
Adeline Morrison Swain		(1820–1899)	2000	Women's rights	
Margaret Boeye Swanson		(1919–2011)	2000	Volunteerism	
Mary Jaylene Berg		(1950–2004)	1999	Professor of pharmacy, advocate of women in health careers and pharmacy	
Rosa Maria Escudé de Findlay		(1936–2019)	1999	Latino rights advocate	
Helen Navran Stein		(1923–2010)	1999	Neighborhood cooperation, working with the blind	
Elaine Eisfelder Szymoniak		(1920–2009)	1999	Iowa State Senator	
Bess Streeter Aldrich		(1881–1954)	1998	Author	
Janice Ann Beran		(b. 1931)	1998	Educator, community and church leader	
Lynn Germain Cutler		(b. 1938)	1998	Political worker and organizer	
Maude Esther White		(1913–2003)	1998	Educator, volunteer	
Charlotte Hughes Bruner		(1917–1999)	1997	Pioneer for African women writers	
Margaret "Peg" Mullen		(1917–2009)	1997	Vietnam War era anti-war activist	
Annie Nowlin Savery		(1831–1891)	1997	Women's suffrage	
Beulah E. Webb		(1895–1998)	1997	African American civic organizer	
Meridel Le Sueur		(1900–1996)	1996	Writer	
Joan Liffring-Zug Bourret		(1929–2022)	1996	Photojournalist who documented 1950s civil rights movement in Cedar Rapids	
Janette Stevenson Murray		(1874–1967)	1996	Educator, voting rights for women, civic leader	
Mary E Wood		(1902–1998)	1996	Business leader, YWCA executive	
Sue M. Wilson Brown		(1877–1941)	1995	Civil rights advocate	
Mary E. Domingues Campos		(b. 1929)	1995	Human rights advocate	
Gertrude Dieken		(1910–2002)	1995	Economist, journalist	
Rowena Edson Stevens		(1852–1918)	1995	Women's suffrage	
Mildred Wirt Benson		(1905–2002)	1994	Children's author who helped develop Nancy Drew books; pilot and journalist	
Lois Eichacker		(1932–2018)	1994	Advocate for disadvantaged, advocate for economic development	
Gertrude Durden Rush		(1880–1962)	1994	First African American female lawyer in Iowa	
Evelyne Jobe Villines		(1930–2017)	1994	Political activist	
Julia Faltinson Anderson		(1919–2012)	1993	Global community worker, included involvement with the Peace Corps and UNESCO	
Mamie Doud Eisenhower		(1896–1979)	1993	First Lady of the United States	
Phebe W. Sudlow		(1831–1922)	1993	Educator	
Jean Adeline Morgan Wanatee		(1910–1996)	1993	First woman elected to the Meskwaki tribal council	
Virginia Harper		(1929–1997)	1992	African American pioneer of integration	
Helen Brown Henderson		(1919–1997)	1992	Advocate for the mentally challenged	
Eve Schmoll Rubenstein		(1907–1993)	1992	Broadcaster	
Mary Beaumont Welch		(1841–1923)	1992	Women's rights, home economics	
Mabel Lossing Jones		(1878–1978)	1991	Educator spent her career teaching in India as the request of the Methodist Episcopal Church	
Mary Louise Duncan Putnam		(1832–1903)	1991	Helped develop the Davenport Academy of Sciences	
Marilyn E. Staples		(1926–2022)	1991	Volunteerism	
Lois Hattery Tiffany		(1924–2009)	1991	Mycologist, educating the public on mushrooms	
Mary Jane Coggeshall		(1836–1937)	1990	Carrie Chapman Catt nicknamed Coggeshall "The Mother of Woman's Suffrage in Iowa"	
Merle Wilna Fleming		(1926–2006)	1990	Civil rights and education reform	
Betty Jean Furgerson		(1927–2018)	1990	Advocate for leadership skills, human rights, civil rights	
Glenda Gates Riley		(b. 1938)	1990	Historian, women's advocate	
Nancy Maria Hill		(1833–1919)	1989	Civil War nurse who became a doctor; advocated for pregnant women and children	
Georgia Rogers Sievers		(1924–2014)	1989	Community activist	
Ruth Wildman Swenson		(1924–2018)	1989	Scientist, encouraging women to enter science professions	
Cristine Swanson Wilson		(1945–1991)	1989	Women's rights	
A. Lillian Edmunds		(1892–1955)	1988	African American advocate for children and youth	
Twila Parker Lummer		(1917–2016)	1988	Advocate of care and education for pregnant teenagers	
Marilyn O. Murphy		(1921–2012)	1988	Volunteerism; civic leader	
Sister Patricia Clare Sullivan		(1928–2018)	1988	Health care	
Jolly Ann Horton Davidson		(1930–2023)	1987	Educator, member of various public broadcasting boards and committees	
Gwendolyn Wilson Fowler		(1907–1997)	1987	First licensed African American woman pharmacist in Iowa	
Lou Henry Hoover		(1874–1944)	1987	First Lady of the United States	
Nellie Verne Walker		(1874–1973)	1987	Sculptor	
Marguerite Esters Cothorn		(1909–1999)	1986	African American musician and civic leader	
Willie Stevenson Glanton		(1922–2017)	1986	First African American woman elected to the Iowa State Legislature	
Jessie M. Parker		(1879–1959)	1986	Educator	
Dorothy Schramm		(1909–2006)	1986	Global affairs	
Gladys B. Black		(1909–1998)	1985	Ornithologist and environmental preservationist	
Edna M. Griffin		(1909–2000)	1985	1948 State of Iowa v. Katz, civil rights landmark ruling	
Anna B. Lawther		(1872–1957)	1985	Advocate for voting rights, women's education	
Alice Van Wert Murray		(1912–2014)	1985	Farmer, community leadership, National Safety Council, Associated Country Women of the World Conference, Living History Farms	
Fannie R. Buchanan		(1875–1957)	1984	Music promoter and organizer	
Mary Frances Clarke		(1803–1887)	1984	Founder of the Sisters of Charity of the Blessed Virgin Mary	
Mary Louise Petersen		(1932–2011)	1984	Volunteerism	
Edith Rose Murphy Sackett		(1901–1987)	1984	Volunteerism	
Virginia Bedell		(1895–1975)	1983	First United States female serving on a regularly appointed parole board	
Evelyn K. Scott Davis		(1921–2001)	1983	Advocate early childhood education	
Beverly George Everett		(1926–2001)	1983	Advocate for women's equality	
Helen LeBaron Hilton		(1910–1993)	1983	Public service	
Peg Stair Anderson		(b. 1928)	1982	State chair Iowa Women's Political Caucus, served on numerous boards and commissions	
Ruth Bluford Anderson		(1921–2013)	1982	Author, university professor, civic leader	
Pearl Hogrefe		(1889–1977)	1982	Scholar, author, educator	
Jeanne Montgomery Smith		(1917–2015)	1982	Physician	
Mary Newbury Adams		(1837–1901)	1981	Founded Northern Iowa Suffrage Association, founded Iowa Federation of Women's Clubs	
Roxanne Barton Conlin		(b. 1944)	1981	U.S. Attorney for the Southern District of Iowa, Assistant Attorney General of Iowa	
Mary Garst		(1928–2014)	1981	Cattle breeder, state director Iowa Beef Improvement Assn, president Iowa Simmental Cattle Assn, served on many organizations, including League of Women Voters, Planned Parenthood of Iowa, and Iowa Children's and Family Services	
Louise Rosenfield Noun		(1908–2002)	1981	Community activist, patron of the arts	
Rosa Cunningham		(1890–1987)	1980	Served in the Women's Army Corps in World War II, women's rights advocate	
Mary Grefe		(1922–2018)	1980	Educator, consultant	
Arabella Mansfield		(1846–1911)	1980	First female lawyer in the United States	
Catherine G. Williams		(1914–2020)	1980	Social worker	
Minnette Doderer		(1923–2005)	1979	Iowa House of Representatives, advocate for women's rights	
Mabel Lee		(1886–1985)	1979	Physical education	
Mary Jane Neville Odell		(1923–2010)	1979	Broadcaster	
Louise Rosenfeld		(1906–1990)	1979	USDAHome economics extension agent	
Jacqueline Day		(1918–2002)	1978	Civic leader, public relations officer for Veterans Administration, part of Congressional fact finding team to Vietnam during war	
Dorothy Houghton		(1890–1972)	1978	Director of the Office of Refugees, Migratory and Voluntary Assistance during the Eisenhower Administration	
Carolyn Pendray		(1881–1958)	1978	Iowa House of Representatives; first female in the state legislature	
Ruth Suckow		(1892–1960)	1978	Author	
Jessie Binford		(1876–1966)	1977	Juvenile Protective Association leadership, social worker and advocate for Hull House	
Jessie Field Shambaugh		(1881–1971)	1977	Known as "The mother of 4-H clubs"	
Ida B. Wise		(1871–1952)	1977	Suffragette, National president Women's Christian Temperance Union, served on White House Conference on Child Health and Protection during Herbert Hoover administration.	
Mary Louise Smith		(1914–1997)	1977	First female Chair of the RNC	
Susan Glaspell		(1876–1948)	1976	1931 Pulitzer Prize for Drama, Alison's House	
Cora Bussey Hillis		(1858–1924)	1976	Helped organize the Iowa Child Welfare Association	
Agnes Samuelson		(1897–1963)	1976	Educator	
Ruth Buxton Sayre		(1896–1980)	1976	Farm spokeswoman, co-founder Association Country Women of the World, Franklin D. Roosevelt and Dwight D. Eisenhower both appointed her to Presidential positions.	
Amelia Jenks Bloomer		(1818–1894)	1975	President and founding member of Iowa Woman Suffrage Association	
Carrie Chapman Catt		(1859–1947)	1975	President of the National American Woman Suffrage Association, founder of the League of Women Voters	
Ola Babcock Miller		(1872–1937)	1975	First female Iowa Secretary of State; instituted the Iowa State Patrol; Ola Babcock Miller Building named in her honor	
Annie Wittenmyer		(1827–1900)	1975	Established the Keokuk Ladies' Soldiers' Aid Society to assist Union Army soldiers during the Civil War. Assisted with passage of an 1892 bill to give pensions to Civil War nurses. Founder and President of the Women's Christian Temperance Union.	
