= Gladys Black =

American ornithologist, conservationist, and writer

Gladys Bowery Black (1909–1998) was an American ornithologist, conservationist, and writer known as "Iowa's Bird Lady". She was inducted into the Iowa Women's Hall of Fame in 1985.

== Early life, education, and marriage ==
Gladys Bowery was born January 4, 1909, one of two children of James M. Bowery and Jerusha (Ford) Bowery. She was raised on a farm east of Pleasantville, Iowa, where her mother introduced her to birding at an early age. She attended Pleasantville High School and went on to obtain a nursing degree from Mercy Hospital (Des Moines, 1930) and a B.S. degree in public health nursing from the University of Minnesota. She began her career as a public health nurse in rural areas of the state.

She married Wayne Black and they moved to Georgia, where Wayne had a job at Warner Robins Air Force Base. Black worked in public health and did a great deal of volunteer work.

== Career in ornithology ==
While living in Georgia, Black began working with ornithology professor David Ware Johnston of Mercer University, and he mentored her as she established a local bird-banding program. When Wayne died in 1956, Black moved back to Pleasantville and joined the Iowa Ornithologists' Union. Although she never received any formal training in ornithology, she would go on to spend more than three decades working on identifying bird species in her home state, keeping checklists, and educating the public about birds and related issues like habitat preservation.

From 1969 to 1987, Black wrote a weekly column on birding that appeared in The Des Moines Register, the Knoxville Journal Express, the Pella Chronicle, and the Marion County News. A number of these columns were republished in her sole book, Iowa Birdlife (1992), a joint project of the Nature Conservancy and the University of Iowa Press that was still in print as of 2015. She also took children on nature hikes and discussed ornithology and conservation at civic and church groups around the state.

In 1978, Simpson College awarded Black an honorary doctorate in recognition of her public outreach and her expertise in the migration and nesting patterns of American birds. Other honors she received included a certificate from the U.S. Army Corps of Engineers recognizing her conservation education efforts related to Lake Red Rock (1978), election as a Fellow of the Iowa Academy of Science (1983), induction into the Iowa Women's Hall of Fame (1985), and recognition from the Iowa governor for her 35 years of volunteerism (1989).

Black was also an amateur woodcarver who in 1968 exhibited one of her own works in an exhibition of bird carvings at the Ward Museum of Wildfowl Art in Maryland; it was subsequently included in a second exhibition at the museum in 2012, "Making Her Mark: A Showcase of Women’s Carvers".

Black died at home on July 19, 1998.

== Legacy ==
Black's work was honored in 2004 by the creation of the Gladys Black Bald Eagle Refuge, funded by public donations and located on a well-known bald eagle roosting site in Marion County, Iowa.

In addition, the Gladys Black Environmental Education Project was set up as a partnership between two nonprofit groups, the Red Rock Lake Association and Marion County Conservation, to encourage public use of county natural resources and to sponsor environmental education and conservation efforts.
