= Ione Genevieve Shadduck =

American women's rights activist

- Born: October 28, 1923; Mattoon, Wisconsin
- Died: May 7, 2022 (aged 98)
- Resting place: Iowa Veterans Cemetery
- Education: University of Wisconsin (BS); Michigan State University (MA, PhD); Drake University Law School (JD)
- Occupations: Professor, coach, lawyer
- Awards: Iowa Women's Hall of Fame

Ione Genevieve Shadduck was an educator, women's rights activist, and attorney. She is known for advocating for equal pay and her work in physical education at Drake University. She was a veteran of the Korean War.

== Early life and education ==
Shadduck was born in Mattoon, Wisconsin on October 28, 1923. She grew up on a farm, attending a one-room schoolhouse for her elementary education.

Her first job was at a local electric company, where she asked for equal pay and was refused, leading her to quit. During World War II, she became a Rosie the Riveter and tested out steel drums. In May of 1949, Shadduck joined the Women's Army Corps and later served in the Korean War.

Under the G.I. Bill, Shadduck earned her BS in Physical Education from the University of Wisconsin. She graduated with honors. She later earned her MA and PhD from Michigan State University.

== Career ==
In 1967, Shadduck was hired by Drake University to lead up their women's physical education program. She created programs for women's swimming, tennis, and badminton, including hiring women to coach them. She was responsible for hiring Drake's first women's basketball coach and their first women's athletic director.

Shadduck lobbied the school's athletic department to transition Drake's women's basketball from six-on-six to the traditional five-player teams. At the time, only Iowa and Oklahoma still restricted women to playing the six-by-six variant of the game, and Shadduck argued that this was incorrectly based on the idea that "girls could only run half a court... (and) couldn’t throw that far." She also argued this made it harder for women to get college basketball scholarships without five-player experience. She is credited as being one of the main drivers in changing Iowa's women basketball competitions to conform to national standards. Shadduck also argued for more female hires and better pay equality, saying that: "While Iowa was ahead of other states, sexism continues in the number and salaries of women coaches and in media coverage".

Shadduck created a coordinated physical education program for men and women at Drake, but the leadership position of the new program was assigned to a man. She filed a discrimination lawsuit against Drake, which was eventually settled. Based on this experience, Shadduck enrolled in law school and passed the Iowa Bar exam in January 1977 on her first attempt. She was known for pioneering the practice of getting expert testimony from economists to assess the economic value of a homemaker in a marriage for divorce cases.

Shadduck was a founding member of the Iowa Women Attorneys Association. She also served for 12 years on the Iowa Civil Rights Commission and was a leader in the Older Women's League. In 2008, she called out the media for the negative attention given to Hillary Clinton in the 2008 Democratic primary.

== Death and legacy ==
Shadduck died on May 7, 2022. She is buried in Iowa Veterans Cemetery in Van Meter, Iowa.

Shadduck is remembered for her activism on women's rights and as someone who "used every arena she worked in to champion equality". Shadduck described herself as a "radical feminist".

In 2019, Shadduck was inducted into the Iowa Women's Hall of Fame.
