= Swander =

Swander is a surname. Notable people with the surname include:

- Mary Swander (born 1950), American author
- Pinky Swander (1880–1944), American baseball player
