= Lois H. Tiffany =

American mycologist

Lois Hattery Tiffany (1924–2009) was a mycologist who taught for over 50 years at Iowa State University (ISU) and was known as "Iowa's mushroom lady". She won a number of awards, including becoming the first recipient of both the Mycological Society of America's Weston Award and the Iowa Governor’s Medal for Science Teaching. She published on many different aspects of fungal life, but her special area of research was Iowa's prairie fungi.

== Early life and education ==
Lois Hattery was born March 8, 1924, near Collins, Iowa, to Charles Hattery and Blanche (Brown) Hattery. She attended Iowa State College (now Iowa State University), earning a B.S. in botany in 1945, and went on to get both M.S. (1947) and Ph.D. (1950) degrees in mycology at the same institution.

In 1945, she married Fremont Henry (Hank) Tiffany. They had three children: Ray, David, and Jean.

== Scientific career ==
Tiffany got her first teaching job in 1950 at Iowa State College (later to become Iowa State University), as an instructor in the Botany and Plant Pathology Department. Despite initial difficulties related to her gender—the university at first did not want to pay her at all, for example, and when she refused, underpaid her at the level of a teaching assistant—she rose to become a full professor in the department in 1965, and she also served as the department's chair for six years (1990–96). She was the first woman in the ISU College of Liberal Arts and Sciences to be awarded the title of Distinguished Professor (1994). She taught a range of courses in mycology at ISU and at Iowa Lakeside Laboratory, and her general mycology course has been termed the best graduate mycology course in the country.

She published over 100 scientific papers and several books on various aspects of fungi, especially soil fungi, plant pathogens, mycotoxins, morels, and lichens. For making scholarly contributions on each of the major groups of the fungus kingdom, she has been referred to as the Renaissance woman of mycological research. She was particularly interested in Iowa prairie fungi, their fungal diseases, and their relationship to environmental changes (such as those resulting from fires). The work Tiffany and her students did on prairie fungi is considered unique among biosurveys. She also carried out long-term studies of Iowa morels and false morels, and of the fungi of Big Bend National Park, making the latter one of the very few national parks to have had such extensive research carried out on its fungi. She was a co-author of the second edition of Mushrooms and Other Fungi of the Mid-Continental United States (2008).

Tiffany helped to integrate the university's mycology collection into its existing herbarium, in the process donating more than 8000 specimens from her own collection.

Tiffany also worked to educate the public about fungi, giving talks and leading field trips with amateur mushroom hunters. In addition, she co-led annual field trips with the university's Botany Club to various national and state parks. It was these outreach efforts that led to her becoming known as "Iowa's mushroom lady", and some of the people who learned from her through these events went on to become active in Iowa savanna conservation efforts.

Tiffany was a member of the American Phytopathological Society and of the Iowa Academy of Science, serving as the IAS's first woman president in 1977–78. She was a member of the editorial board of the journal Mycopathologia, and she was appointed by the Iowa governor to serve on the State Preserves Advisory Board.

Tiffany formally retired from the university in 2002 but maintained a small lab there and continued teaching until 2005. She died Sept. 6, 2009, in Ames, Iowa.

== Honors and legacy ==
Tiffany was honored with a number of awards during her lifetime. A member of the Mycological Society of America, she was given the first W. H. Weston Award for Teaching Excellence in Mycology in 1980. She also received the first Iowa Governor’s Medal for Science Teaching (1982). Other honors included the Distinguished Iowa Scientist Award from the Iowa Academy of Science (1982), the ISU Regents Award for Faculty (1990), an Honorary Outstanding Career Award from the North Central Division of the American Phytopathological Society (2009), and several distinguished service awards from scientific organizations. She was inducted into the Iowa Women's Hall of Fame in 1991.

In recognition of Tiffany's work on Iowa truffles, a Mediterranean truffle species was named after her, Mattirolomyces tiffanyae.

After her death, a paving stone with her name was placed in the Plaza of Heroines at the entrance to ISU's Center for Women and Politics.

In 2013, the Nature Conservancy named a piece of recently acquired prairie land in northwest Iowa the Dr. Lois Tiffany Prairie in her honor. It is an 80-acre parcel in the Glacial Hills of Little Sioux Valley.

Tiffany's papers are held by Iowa State University.
