= Adeline Morrison Swain =

American politician

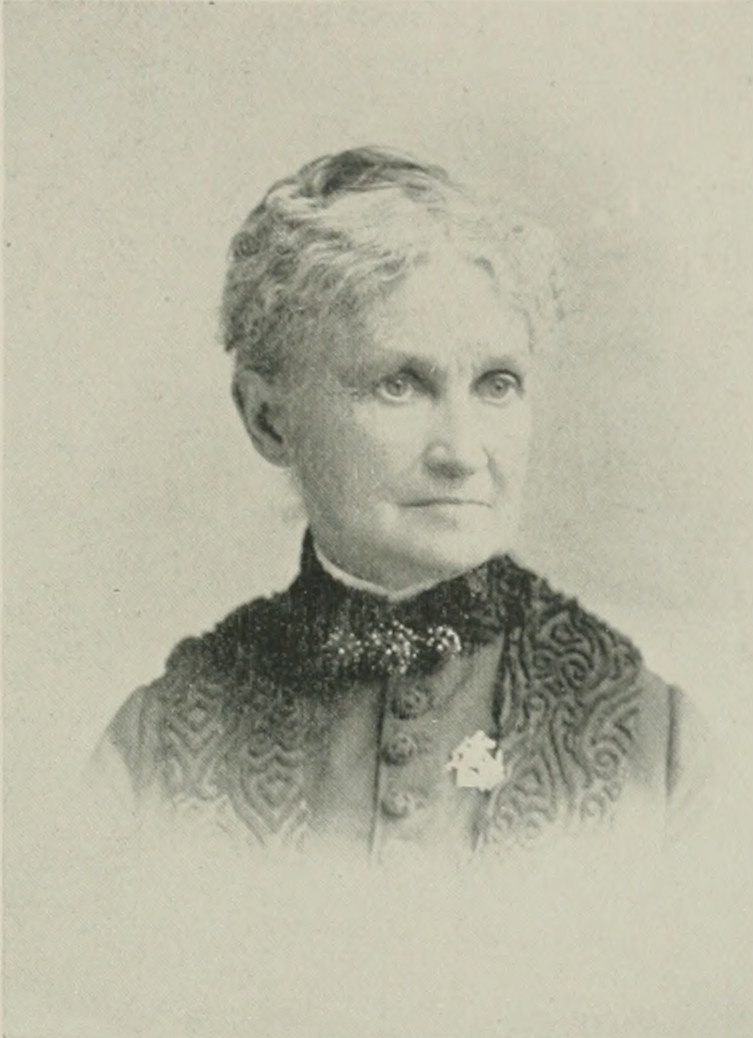
- Born: May 25, 1820; Bath, New Hampshire
- Died: February 3, 1899 (aged 78)
- Resting place: Fort Dodge, Iowa
- Spouse: James Swain (m. 1846; died in 1878)

Adeline Morrison Swain (May 25, 1820 – February 3, 1899) was an American writer, politician and suffragist. She was inducted into the Iowa Women's Hall of Fame in 2000.

== Life ==
Swain née Morrison was born on May 25, 1820, in Bath, New Hampshire. In her childhood, she was given an education by her mother, a schoolteacher. After completing her education at 16, she took a teaching position at a women's seminary. There, she taught drawing, painting, and modern languages. In 1846 she married James Swain and the couple settled in Fort Dodge, Iowa, in 1858. While living in Buffalo, New York, Swain became interested in spiritualism and eventually became an advocate of its doctrines and philosophy. In Fort Dodge she organized French, English, music, botany, and art classes specifically for young women.

Swain's main interests lay in public affairs and social reforms rather than the arts and sciences, with a particular focus on women's rights. In the early 1870s the couple built a large Victorian house in Fort Dodge. It became known as a "literary center" with vast collections of art and literature. The house was grander than their income allowed and they rented out rooms to boarders and also made the house available for events.

Swain was an advocate for women's right to vote and handed in a ballot for several years despite it not ever being counted. At the very beginning of the fight for women's suffrage in Iowa in 1857, only white males over 21 could vote or run for office. In 1869, Swain organized the first woman suffrage meeting in Fort Dodge and Martha H. Brinkerhoff of Missouri delivered a lecture to the community. In June 1871, and on two other occasions, Susan B. Anthony arrived in Fort Dodge to advocate for women's rights. Swain received Anthony as her guest in what was noted in her diary as a "bedbuggy room". Jane Swisshelm stayed with Swain in 1874. But by 1879 they sold the house to Webb Vincent. In 1977 the Swain-Vincent House was listed on the National Register of Historic Places as the Vincent House.

Swain was appointed as a correspondent of the Entomological Commission of the U.S. Department of Agriculture which led her, in 1877, to write a report documenting the devastation of crops brought on by the Colorado grasshopper. She subsequently became a member of the American Association for the Advancement of Science and became the first woman to present a paper at their national convention.

In 1873, however, Swain and her husband faced bankruptcy and business loss [see Panic of 1873] that precipitated Swain's political involvement and her interest in farmer's movement. Swain thus became active in politics where she was affiliated with the Greenback Party. In 1883, the Greenback Party nominated Swain for the office of Iowa Superintendent of Public Instruction. Though she lost, she was the first woman to run for statewide public office in Iowa and gained nearly 27,000 votes, and even garnered more votes than male Greenback party members who ran for other positions in public office. Adeline Swain had been the president of the suffrage club and made history as one of the first women in the nation to present a political campaign speech. She had also been an editor for the political science department in the Woman’s Tribune. By 1884, Swain was an accredited delegate of the Indianapolis National Greenback convention.

After moving to Illinois in 1887, Swain died on February 3, 1899, and was buried in Fort Dodge.

== Legacy ==
Swain was included in the 1893 publication A Woman of the Century. She was memorialized in the "Annals of Iowa, Vol. 4, No. 1 (1899)" and was inducted into the Iowa Women's Hall of Fame in 2000.

Adeline was provided a marker in her honor located in Fort Dodge, Webster County, Iowa located at the Vincent House, reading " Leader in Iowa and Illinois State suffrage movements. Honorary V. P. Nat'l American Woman Suffrage Assn 1896. Owned this property". This plaque was granted to Adeline Morris in 2020 as part of The National Votes for Women Trail to honor her contributions to seek women's rights to vote.

== See also ==
- List of suffragists and suffragettes
