= Catherine G. Williams =

American social worker

- Born: November 21, 1914; Des Moines, Iowa, US
- Died: May 20, 2020 (aged 105)
- Education: Cortez Peters Business College; Drake University; University of Iowa
- Occupation: Social worker
- Spouse(s): Richard Williams, Jr. (m. 1963; died 1995)

Catherine Gayle Virginia Williams (November 21, 1914 – May 20, 2020) was an American social worker. She worked for the Iowa Department of Social Services and other organizations. Williams won multiple awards including being inducted into the Iowa Women's Hall of Fame.

== Personal life ==
Williams was born in Des Moines, Iowa, on November 21, 1914. She had six siblings. Williams graduated from North High School as a valedictorian. She later received a degree from Cortez Peters Business College in Chicago, a Bachelor of Science degree from Drake University, and a master's degree in social work from the University of Iowa. Williams was married to funeral director Richard Williams for around 30 years, until his death in 1995.

== Career ==
After graduating from high school, Williams tap danced in Chicago, New York, and Los Angeles for 13 years. Williams began her career in social work as a typist. She was deputy commissioner of the Iowa Department of Social Services, and she was the highest-ranking black female official within the Iowa government. She started many programs for the state's Department of Social Services such as the first Iowa-wide foster parent training program of children with special needs. After Williams retired in 1981, she worked for Johnson and Williams Associates as a consultant. Her social work includes being on the Health Facilities Council, the City of Des Moines Planning and Zoning Committee, the Project Helper Board, the Council of Human Services, and others. She coordinated the Iowa Commission on the Status of Women and the Commission on Aging Conference on Older Women.

=== Awards ===
As a part of Delta Sigma Theta, Williams promoted a dropout prevention project which resulted in President John F. Kennedy awarding her chapter with the National Public Service Award. She was inducted into the Iowa Women's Hall of Fame in 1980, and the Iowa African-Americans Hall of Fame in 1999. In 2013, the Catherine G. Williams Lifetime Achievement Award was created by the Iowa Chapter of the National Association of Social Workers. Her other awards were the Iowa Social Worker of the Year and the YWCA/Mary Louise Smith Racial Justice Award. She received alumni awards from North High School, Drake University, and the University of Iowa School of Social Work.

== Death ==
Williams died on May 20, 2020. Commissioner of Iowa's Department of Human Services Michael V. Reagen wrote of Williams after her death, "Life’s great when lived for others. Williams “walked the walk” and kindly used tough love to guide and assist those around her. Her fingerprints are still on many of the programs that have positively improved the lives of Iowa's most vulnerable."
