= Jean Y. Jew =

American academic (born 1948)

Jean Y. Jew (born October 7: 1948 Greenwood, Mississippi) was an American academic who was a tenured professor at the University of Iowa College of Medicine. She retired in 2010.

== Early life ==
Jew received am undergraduate biology degrees from Newcomb College, Tulane University and Tulane University School of Medicine.

== Career ==
=== Research ===
At the University of Iowa, Jew’s research centered on the autonomic nervous system and the brain.

=== Harassment case ===
Jew sued the University of Iowa and the Board of Regents in federal court on the basis of sex discrimination under Title VII of the Civil Rights Act of 1964.

Jew contended there were false rumors of her having a sexual relationship with her department head and that resulted in a hostile work environment. She also contends it was the reason why she wasn’t made a full professor.

She won her case, which took ten years. Her experiences inspired her to be one of the founding members of the Iowa Women’s Foundation.

Yale Law School has a case study of the case they use for their students.

The University established the Jean Jew Women’s Rights Award in 1992 to honor those “who demonstrate outstanding effort or achievement in improving the status of women on campus.”

== Awards and honors ==
Jew is a 2018 inductee of the Iowa Women's Hall of Fame.
