= Emma J. Harvat =

American businesswoman and mayor

Emma J. Harvat (1870–1949) was an American businesswoman and politician, notable as the first female mayor of Iowa City, Iowa, and as the first woman to be elected leader of a United States municipality with a population exceeding 10,000.

== Early life ==
Emma Harvat was born in 1870, the ninth of ten children of Joseph and Mary Harvat, who had immigrated to the United States from Czechoslovakia in 1854. Emma's father operated a meat market in Iowa City during the 1880s. Joseph and Mary died by 1889. Mary attended the Iowa City Academy and Williams Commercial College, studying business, an unusual field for the time for women. Following her studies, Emma worked at the Lee Welch bookstore as a clerk. By 1902 Emma had accumulated enough savings to buy the shares of John Ries of the Lee and Ries bookstore, and owned the entire operation in another two years. Selling the store for a profit, she moved to Kirksville, Missouri, where she bought and turned around a failing bookstore, going on to buy and sell other businesses in Kirksville and surrounding towns. At the age of 43 Emma was financially secure and she returned to Iowa City to retire.

== Iowa City ==
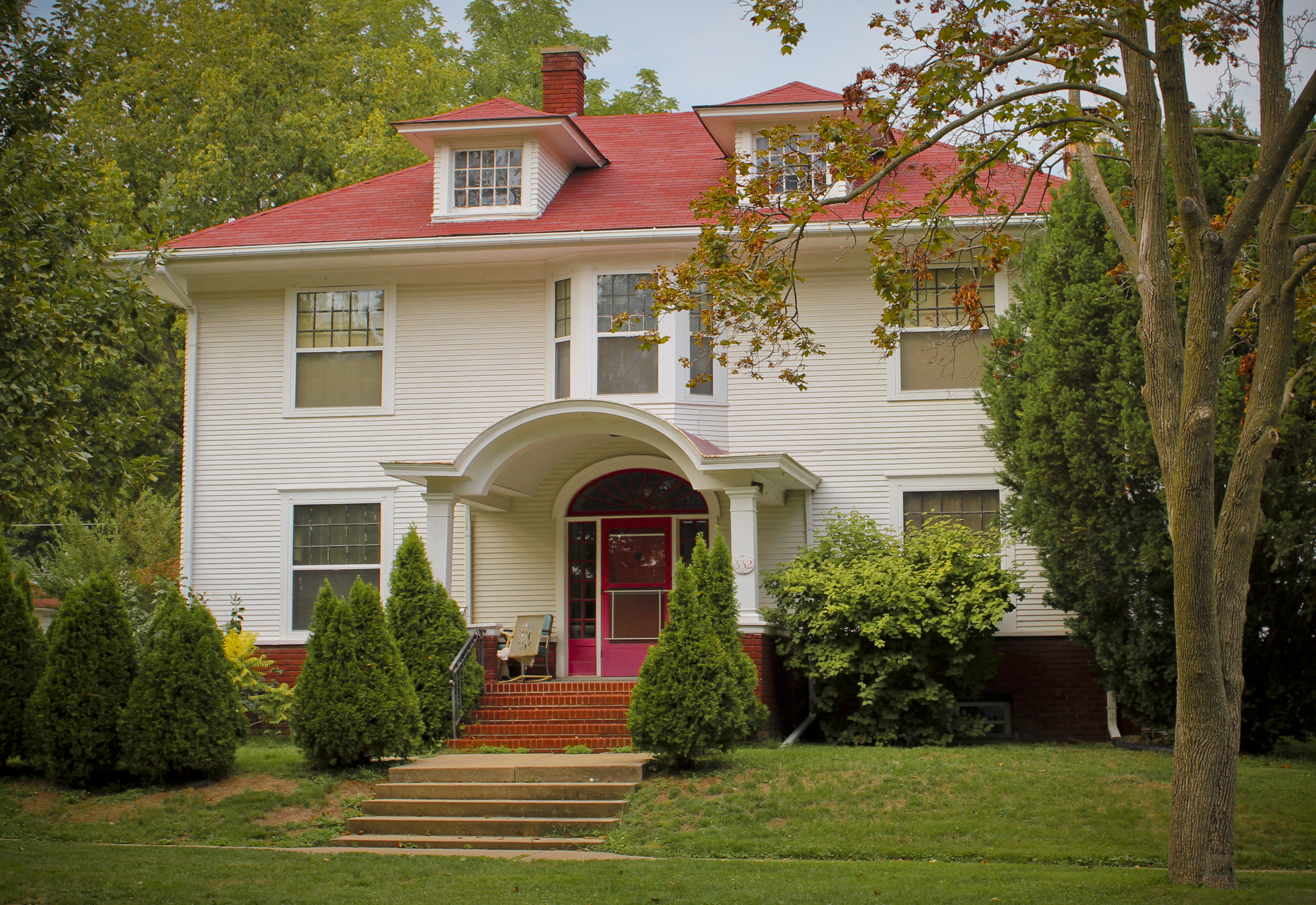
Emma J. Harvat and Mary E. Stach House, Iowa City

In Iowa City Emma rented a room from Theresa Stach, the mother of friend Mary (May) Stach. Using an inheritance that Stach had received, Emma and Mary opened a ladies' clothing store in 1913, Harvat and Stach, which became a success. Stach was the store's expert on fashion, and Harvat ran the business. By 1919 Harvat and Stach built a new house, the Emma J. Harvat and Mary E. Stach House, now listed on the National Register of Historic Places.

Harvat was elected to the Iowa City city council in 1921, serving two terms as alderman-at-large. In 1922 the then-mayor, Ingalls Swisher, resigned and Emma Harvat was elected mayor pro tem by the council. She ran for mayor in 1923 and was elected, the first female mayor of Iowa City. As the first female leader of a city with a population of more than 10,000 in the United States, her election was covered in national and international newspapers. She served as mayor until 1925 through a period of civic growth. During her tenure a zoning commission was established, and city services were improved and extended. Harvat lost election to a third term, and made an unsuccessful run for the council in 1935.

Emma Harvat died in 1949, aged 79. In 2000 the City Council auditorium at the City Hall of Iowa City, was designated Emma J. Harvat Hall. She was inducted into the Iowa Women's Hall of Fame in 2007.

== See also ==
- List of mayors of Iowa City
