= Gilbert-Linn Street Historic District =

Historic district in Iowa, United States

- U.S. National Register of Historic Places
- U.S. Historic district
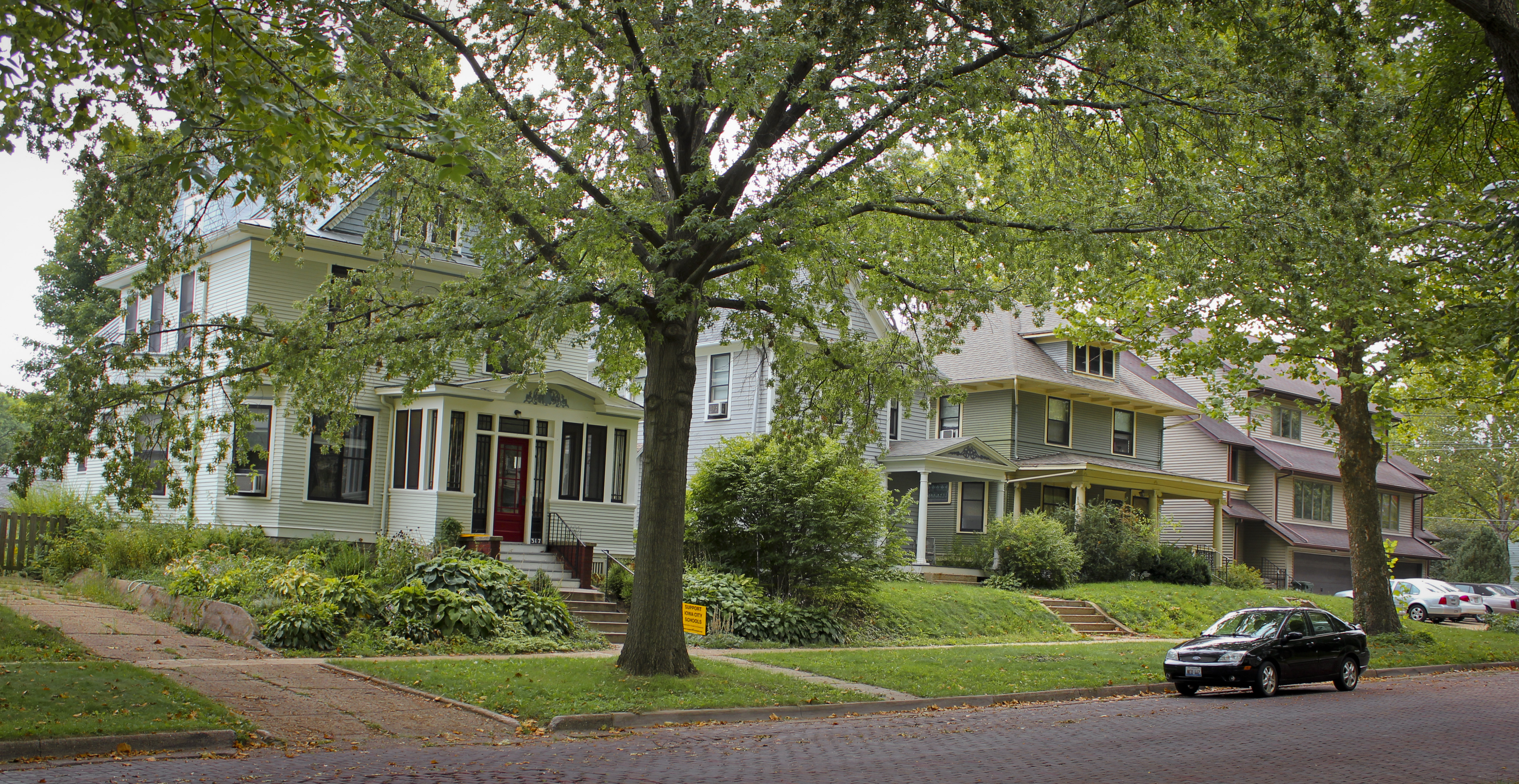

- Location within Iowa Location within the United States
- Location: Portions of the 300-600 blocks of N. Gilbert and N. Linn Sts., Iowa City, Iowa
- Coordinates: 41°40′0″N 91°31′49″W
- Area: 22 acres (8.9 ha)
- Built by: Sheets & Freyder
- Architect: O.H. Carpenter
- Architectural style: Queen Anne; Greek Revival
- MPS: Iowa City MPS
- NRHP reference No.: 05000366
- Added to NRHP: April 21, 2005

The Gilbert-Linn Street Historic District is a nationally recognized historic district located in Iowa City, Iowa, United States. It was listed on the National Register of Historic Places in 2005. At the time of its nomination it consisted of 120 resources, which included 94 contributing buildings and 26 non-contributing buildings. This section of the city was developed as the population increased in the late 19th and early 20th centuries. The growth was due, in part, to the expansion of the University of Iowa and its hospitals. There was also an expansion of the central business district at the same time. Both professionals and business owners built houses here. The district contains houses for the upper class and the middle class, side by side to each other. It was also the place where German and Bohemian immigrant families resided.

The architectural styles and vernacular house forms found here are representative of those built in the city from the 1860s through the 1930s. The Queen Anne and Greek Revival styles are particularly evident. Local architect Orville H. Carpenter designed at least eight houses in the district. The Emma J. Harvat and Mary E. Stach House (1918) were individually listed on the National Register of Historic Places.
