= Joan Liffring-Zug Bourret =

American photographer (1929–2022)

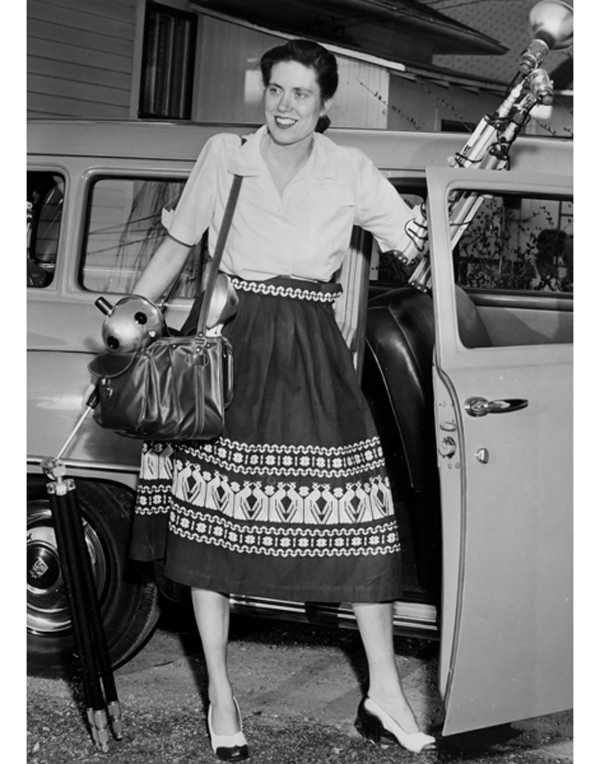
- Liffring at age 23
- Born: Joan Liffring; February 20, 1929; Iowa City, Iowa, U.S.
- Died: October 16, 2022 (aged 93); Solon, Iowa, U.S.
- Occupations: Book publisher, photographer

Joan Liffring-Zug Bourret (February 20, 1929 – October 16, 2022) was an American photographer, book publisher, and civil rights activist. On April 6, 1951, she became the first woman to photograph herself giving birth.

She contributed more than 500,000 negatives from the 1940s to 2007 to the archives of the State Historical Society of Iowa and has been called Iowa's premier documentary photographer of the 20th century. In 1996 she was inducted into the Iowa Women's Hall of Fame. She founded Penfield Books in 1979. Penfield Books has published more than 110 titles.

Bourret's autobiography, Pictures and People: A Search for Visual Truth and Social Justice was awarded the Benjamin Franklin Award by the Independent Book Publishers Association in the category of Autobiographies/Memoirs in 2012.

On March 1, 2023, Joan was posthumously presented with the Arts Legacy Award by Iowa Governor Kim Reynolds and the Iowa Arts Council.

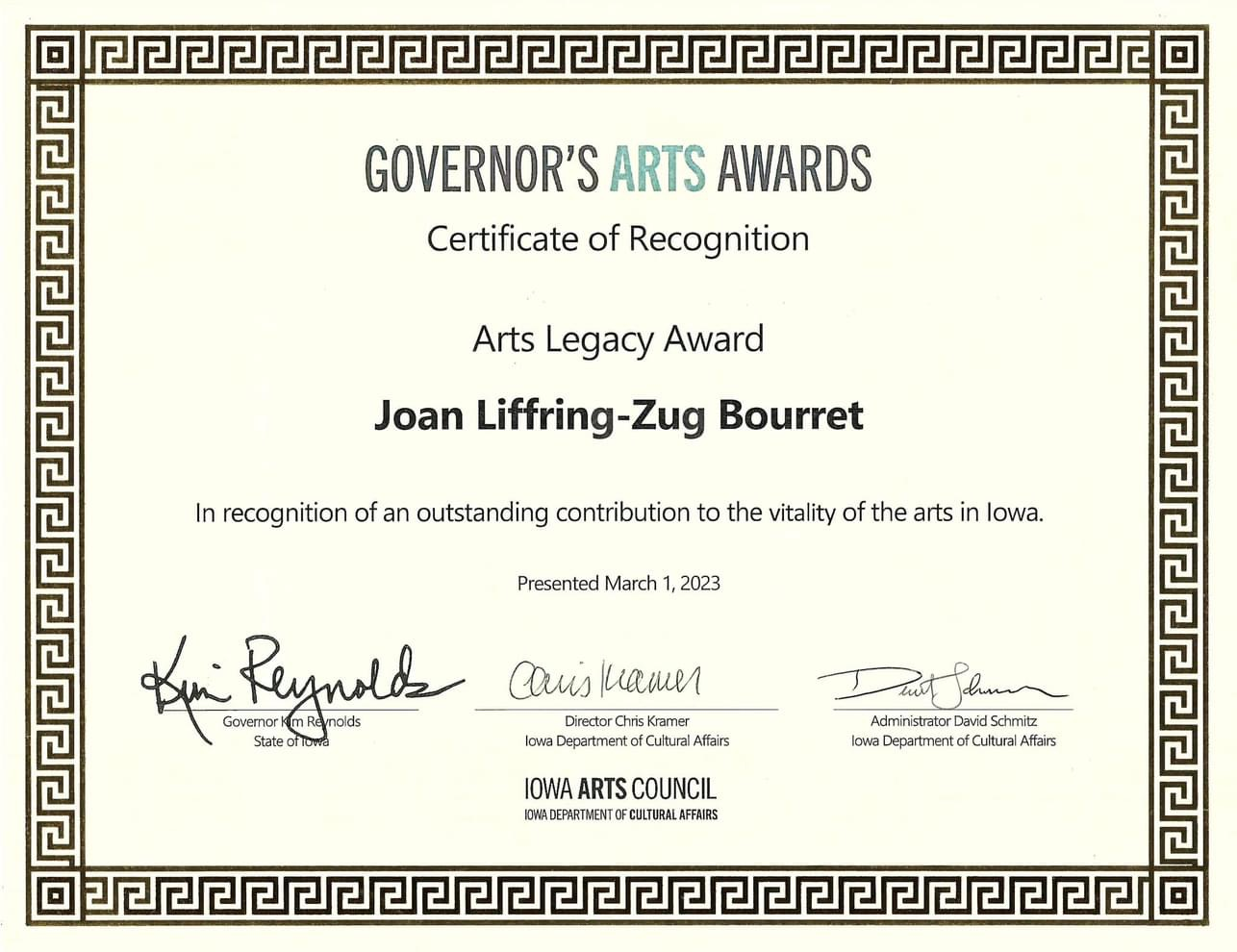

On October 16, 2024, Joan was posthumously presented with the Women of Achievement Award by Women Lead Change. A permanent plaque bearing her name was installed on the Women of Achievement Bridge in Des Moines Iowa.
