= Virginia Harper =

American civil rights activist (1929–1997)

- Born: December 23, 1929; Fort Madison, Iowa
- Died: September 3, 1997 (aged 67); Cedar Rapids, Iowa

Virginia Harper (December 23, 1929 – September 3, 1997) was a civil rights activist known for her work against the rerouting of U.S. Highway 61 (US 61) through the Mexican-American and Black neighborhoods of Fort Madison, Iowa.

== Early life and education ==
Harper was born in Fort Madison, Iowa, a descendant of George Stevens, a freed slave who bought land nearby and was an area farmer. She was the oldest of five children of Lillie (Grinage) Harper, a science teacher, and Harry Harper Sr., a medical doctor who ran his own medical clinic.

She graduated from Fort Madison High School in 1946 and attended the University of Iowa in 1946. The campus had segregated dormitories and all the other Black students lived off campus at the Negro Women's Clubs of Iowa except for lighter skinned Black students who could pass for White. Black students were refused service at campus facilities such as the Iowa Memorial Union. Harper and four other women moved into Currier Hall on campus. Known as the Currier Five, their story is told on a campus mural installed in 2021.

She attended the University of Iowa for three years and also studied at Howard University. She completed her education at the College of Medical Technology in Minneapolis. She was employed as an x-ray technician and medical assistant at her father's medical clinic from 1952 until 1977.

== Activism ==
Harper's father was the longtime president of the local chapter of the NAACP. As a pre-teen she and her siblings would go to the movies, but would have to sit in the segregated areas in the balcony or at the back of the theater. They would often sit where they chose, resisting the ushers' exhortations to move. Harper resisted segregation where she encountered it, working with others to integrate the University of Iowa dorms.

She joined the local branch of the NAACP in 1949 and was active there for the rest of her life. She was the organization's secretary in the 1960s, and served as president from 1978 until her death in 1997. She was the organization's newsletter editor in the 1960s and through it mounted a "selective buying campaign," encouraging people to patronize Black and Mexican American-owned businesses and boycott those businesses which continued to discriminate.

From 1968 through 1976 Harper worked to oppose the rerouting of US 61 through the southwest corner of the city which was the location of the city's Mexican American and African American neighborhoods. She worked with the legal team at the national NAACP office and wrote letters, circulated petitions, spoke at public meetings until the Iowa State Highway Commission and the Iowa Department of Transportation abandoned the plan. She filed a legal complaint against the project, saying that it violated Title VI of the Civil Rights Act since the majority of those who would be displaced were members of minority populations.

In the 1960s she helped establish a branch of the NAACP at the Iowa State Penitentiary. She was appointed to the State Board of Public Instruction in 1971 and to the Iowa Board of Parole in 1979, the first Black woman to serve on either board. Through her work with the local school district, she served on a committee responsible for implementing state multicultural and nonsexist guidelines. She belonged to the Fort Madison Human Rights Commission and was president of the Library Board of Trustees in the 1970s and 1980s. She was on the steering committee of the Iowa Black Network which lobbied politicians and area leaders about issues facing the Black community and to work for better jobs and committee positions for Black Iowans.

In the late 90s just before her death she was writing letters to the editor and speaking to the city council about discrimination within the Fort Madison Police Department.

== Death and legacy ==
Harper died on September 3, 1997, in Cedar Rapids, Iowa. She was inducted into the Iowa Women's Hall of Fame in 1992. In 1998, she posthumously received the Martin Luther King Jr. Achievement Award from the Iowa Commission on the Status of African-Americans. Her papers are held by the University of Iowa Libraries' Iowa Women's Archives collection.
