= Bruce Teague =

American politician (born 1976)

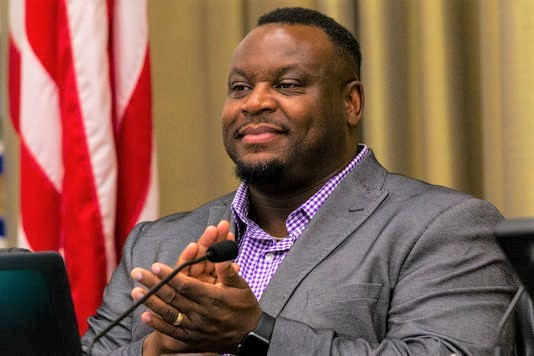

Mayor of Iowa City, Iowa
- Incumbent
- Assumed office January 2, 2018

Personal details
- Born: Bruce Ali Teague III; July 27, 1976 (age 49) Chicago, Illinois, U.S.
- Party: Democratic
- Education: Kirkwood Community College; (AAS); University of Iowa; (BA, Cert.)

Bruce Ali Teague III (born July 27, 1976) is an American entrepreneur serving as the mayor of Iowa City since 2018.

== Early life and education ==
Bruce Teague was born July 27, 1976, who is also known as Bruce, Junger, and Brucie. He moved to Iowa City from Chicago at 17 years old. Later, he earned his associate degree from Kirkwood Community College, a bachelor's degree in psychology and a certificate in aging studies from the University of Iowa.

== Career ==
=== Entrepreneurship ===
Teague is the CEO of Caring Hands and More, whose services include home care/companionship care, parent helper, pet care, professional cleaning, lawn care, supported community living, day rehabilitation, and crisis stabilization (CSB). He also owns CHARM Homes, LLC.

=== Politics / Iowa City Council (2018-2023) ===
On Oct 2, 2018, Teague was elected to the Iowa city council to fill the remainder of a four-year term vacated by Kingsley Botchway, who moved away from Iowa City. In early January 2020, he was appointed as Mayor of Iowa City, and was re-appointed in January 2022 for a four-year term.

== See also ==
- List of first African-American mayors
- List of mayors of Iowa City
