= Nancy M. Hill =

American Civil War nurse

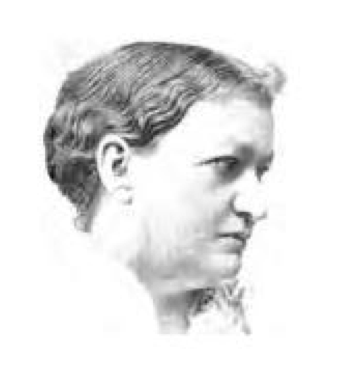
- Our Army Nurses, 1895
- Born: Nancy Maria Hill; November 19, 1833; Boston, Massachusetts
- Died: January 8, 1919 (aged 85); Dubuque, Iowa
- Education: Mount Holyoke College, University of Michigan
- Medical career
- Profession: Physician, nurse
- Field: Obstetrics
- Institutions: Armory Square Hospital

Nancy Maria Hill (November 19, 1833 – January 8, 1919) was an American Civil War nurse who later became one of the first women physicians in the United States. She specialized in obstetrics and founded what is now called Hillcrest Family Services, an organization providing support to single mothers and their children in Dubuque, Iowa.

== Biography ==
Hill was born in Boston, Massachusetts, in 1833, to William and Harriet (Swan) Hill. She was well educated, and attended Mount Holyoke College. She served as a volunteer nurse during the American Civil War, during which time she worked at the Armory Square Hospital in Washington, D.C.

When the war ended, Hill was inspired by her nursing experiences to study for a medical degree and was admitted to the University of Michigan's medical school in Ann Arbor. She graduated in 1874, at the age of 41, becoming one of the first female physicians in the United States. Shortly afterwards, she moved to Dubuque, Iowa, where she would practice medicine for 36 years. She specialized in obstetrics and once noted, "I was never a mother but brought about 1000 children into this world."

Hill established the Women's Rescue Society of Dubuque in 1896 to provide shelter and support for unwed mothers and their babies. She was involved in the organization until 1909 when she was forced to close the residential facility as a result of financial problems and her own advanced age. The facility was reopened by Anna Blanche Cook in 1914 as the Hillcrest Deaconess Home and Baby Fold and is now called Hillcrest Family Services. Hill died in 1919 and was buried in Linwood Cemetery in Dubuque.

Seventy years after her death, Hill was inducted into the Iowa Women's Hall of Fame in 1989.
