= Mabel Lee (teacher) =

American physical education teacher

- Born: August 14, 1886; Clearfield, Iowa
- Died: December 3, 1985 (aged 99); Lincoln, Nebraska
- Education: Coe College, Boston Normal School of Gymnastics
- Occupation: educator

Mabel Lee (18 August 1886 - 3 December 1985) was an American physical education teacher, advocate, and author, best known for serving as the director of physical education for women at the University of Nebraska from 1924 to 1952, being the first woman president of the American Alliance for Health, Physical Education, Recreation, and Dance (AAHPERD), and being the first woman president of the American Academy of Physical Education (now National Academy of Kinesiology).

== Life ==
=== Early years ===
Lee was born in Clearfield, Iowa, on August 18, 1886, to Jennie Aikman Lee and David Alexander Lee, who worked in the lumber business for most of her childhood. Marie had three sisters and no brothers. In 1893, Lee moved with her family to Centerville, Iowa when David joined the coal business.

=== Education ===
Lee graduated from Centerville High School in 1904, then went to Coe College in Cedar Rapids, Iowa where she majored in psychology and minored in biology. She graduated magna cum laude in the Class of 1908. She wanted to teach physical education, so she enrolled in the Boston Normal School of Gymnastics, which was later acquired by Wellesley College.

Throughout her career, Lee was recognized with honorary doctorates in physical education from Coe College, Beloit College, and George Williams College.

=== Academic and professional career ===
After graduation from Wellesley, Lee returned to Coe College in 1910 where she was the director of physical education for women. During this time, she started several traditions including the May Fete (an interpretation dance program held on the quad) and Colonial Ball (a dance celebrating George Washington's birthday). In 1918, Marie accepted a position with the Oregon Agricultural College in Corvallis (now Oregon State University). During the Spanish flu epidemic, Lee became seriously ill and was forced to resign and move back to her parents' home in Iowa for recovery. When she could work again, she spent four years (1920–1924) as the director of physical education for women at Beloit College in Beloit, Wisconsin.

The majority of Lee's career was as the director of physical education for women and a professor at the University of Nebraska–Lincoln. In her role, she expanded the PE department and served on several committees. In her time leading the UNL physical education department for women, participation in women's intramural sports expanded from 3% to 80%.

In 1931, Lee was elected as the first woman president of the American Alliance for Health, Physical Education, Recreation, and Dance.

At the 1932 Summer Olympics in Los Angeles, Lee substituted for First Lady Lou Hoover in presiding over the women's competitions.

== Publications ==
Lee's first book, The Conduct of Physical Education (1937), was adopted as a text in most colleges and universities. Her second book, Fundamentals of Body Mechanics and Conditioning (1949), was written with Miriam Wagner. Her final book on physical education, A History of Physical Education and Sports in the U.S.A. (1983), was published when she was 97.

Lee also received an Amy Morris Homans Fellowship Award from Wellesley College that resulted in two autobiographies: Memories of a Bloomer Girl, 1894-1924 (1977). and Memories Beyond Bloomers, 1924-1954 (1978). These books recount the history of the physical education movement in the United States in addition to Lee's life.

== Honors ==
Inducted in 1931, Lee is Fellow #30 in the National Academy of Kinesiology (formerly American Academy of Physical Education; American Academy of Kinesiology and Physical Education). Further, she served as the Academy's Interim President during 1938-1939, and President during 1941-1943.

Lee received several national awards including two from the American Association for Health, PE, and Recreation: the Luther Halsey Gulick Award in 1948 and the R. Tait McKenzie Award in 1968. The American Academy of Physical Education (now National Academy of Kinesiology) recognized her with its highest honor, the Hetherington Award, in 1957.

In 1977, the Women's Physical Education Building at UNL was renamed Mabel Lee Hall in her honor. Also in 1977, Lee was inducted into the Coe College Athletic Hall of Fame.

In 1979 Lee was inducted into the Iowa Women's Hall of Fame.
