= Jessie Binford =

American social worker (1876–1966)

Jessie Florence Binford (1876 Marshalltown, Iowa-1966), aka “the conscience of Chicago”, was a social worker who worked closely with Jane Addams at Hull House. Binford was the founder and executive director of the Juvenile Protective Association in 1916 and stayed for 32 years.

She is a 1977 inductee in the Iowa Women's Hall of Fame.

== Biography ==
Before she resided at Hull House, Bindfors graduated from Rockford College.

=== University of Illinois Chicago ===
The City of Chicago wanted to build a campus of the University of Illinois Chicago on the site of the Hull House in 1959. Binford and Florence Scala led the fight against the plan. Trustees accepted an offer of $875,000 in 1963 and the two took the case to the Supreme Court of the United States. The Court ruled in favor of the University and closed the case on March 28, 1963.
