= Fannie R. Buchanan =

American musician and writer

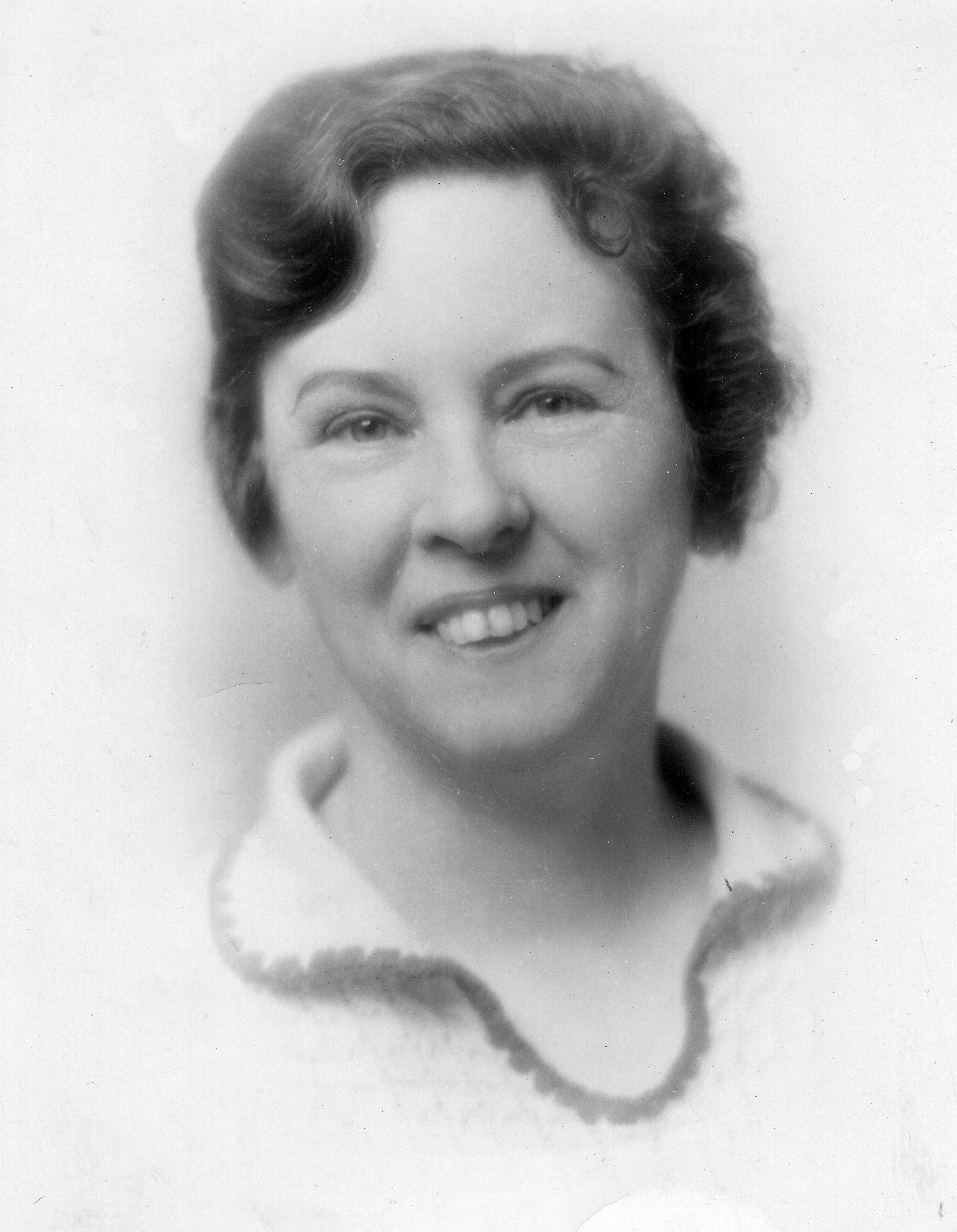
- Born: 1875; Victor, Iowa, US
- Died: 1957 (aged 81–82); Grinnell, Iowa, US
- Occupation(s): Musician and writer

Fannie R. Buchanan (1875–1957) was an American musician and writer who organized music programs for people in rural Iowa. She was known for conducting music projects and writing songs for 4-H clubs. Buchanan was posthumously inducted into the Iowa Women's Hall of Fame in 1984.

== Personal life and career ==
Buchanan was born on September 23,1875 in Victor, Iowa, and she spent her childhood in Grinnell, Iowa. She graduated from the Iowa College School of Music, now Grinnell College, in 1900 as part of its Music Department. Her personal music studio was active for 12 years in Grinnell and she taught music to children in rural Iowa. For two years, Buchanan was a play supervisor for Redpath Chautauqua Company in Iowa, Minnesota, South Dakota, and North Dakota. She was later a manager and director of the same company for women attending Grinnell College. For 18 months, she was Supervisor of Recreation for the New York War Camp Community Service Girls' Division. Buchanan was one of the editors of Compton Publication Company in Chicago, Illinois, for one year and she was a writer for Compton's Encyclopedia. She then was a field worker for one year for the American Red Cross, Northern Division.

Buchanan was known for conducting music projects as a part of the Iowa State College Extension Service, starting in 1922 as the first to be in that position. During the Great Depression, she taught classical and folk music to people in rural Iowa. As a part of 4-H Clubs while she was an employee of the Victor Talking Machine Company, Buchanan promoted music and co-wrote songs with some of them still being sung as "official 4-H songs". She conducted songs for farmers and their wives as a part of Farmers Week in Niagara County, New York. Buchanan wrote various music booklets including Music Gems from an Old World Treasure Chest, Half-Hour Studies from Famous Operas, Musical Moments from Latin America, and Short Stories of American Music. She also wrote storybooks such as "Sunny Crest Farmyard" (1925). In 1959, she authored the book "How man made music" about the historical development of music, musical instruments, lives and works of great composers, and various musical forms.

=== Honors ===
In 1942, she received a citation and medal from the USDA "for outstanding contributions to rural culture". Her work with and music for 4-H programs across the country was documented in the booklet "The music and story of Fannie R. Buchanan's 4-H songs" in 1949. She was inducted into the Iowa 4-H Hall of Fame in 2002 and the National 4-H Hall of Fame in 2007. She was inducted into the Iowa Women's Hall of Fame in 1984. She has a brick on the Plaza of Heroines at Iowa State University.

During World War II, she became disabled during a collision between a train and a car which ended her career in the extension music program. She died on September 3, 1957, in Grinnell.
