= Ruth Buxton Sayre =

President of the Associated Country Women of the World (1896–1980)

Ruth Buxton Sayre (January 25, 1896 – November 23, 1980) was born in Indianola, Iowa, United States. She was the American president of the Associated Country Women of the World, from 1947 until 1952. She was appointed to President Eisenhower’s Agricultural Advisory Committee in 1953. In 1976 she was inducted into the Iowa Women's Hall of Fame. Her papers are held at the State Historical Society of Iowa in Iowa City, Iowa. Her life is chronicled in the book Ruth Buxton Sayre: First Lady of the Farm, by Julie McDonald.

Sayre was an advocate for national and international social organizations with a rural, agricultural focus. Her involvement in the American Farm Bureau Federation began in 1922 and eventually led to an appointment as state chairman in 1930. Sayre also participated in the Rural Welfare Committee of the United Nations Food and Agriculture Organization and the National Society for Crippled Children and Adults.
