= Virginia Bedell =

American lawyer

Virginia P. Bedell (1895-1975) was an American attorney and the founder of Assigned Children who helped children of veterans.

== Biography ==
Bedell became an Iowa county attorney through on-the-job training rather than obtain a degree. She was the first American woman to be a part of a parole board, a position that she held for 19 years, later being elected to President of the Central States Correction Association and then joining the first Governor's Commission on Alcoholism. Bedell was active in her church and was a Republican. She founded Assigned Children to help children of veterans as a part of the Legion Auxiliary.

Bedell has a brick on Iowa State University's Plaza of Heroines. She was posthumously added to the Iowa Women's Hall of Fame in 1983. Her son Jack stated on August 24, 1983, of her addition, "She was never satisfied until she reached the top. She didn't do anything part way. She was of the opinion that there was nothing beyond the abilities of women".
