= Rosa Cunningham =

American soldier and civil rights advocate

Rosa Ethel Cunningham (February 19, 1890 – May 25, 1987) was an American soldier and civil rights advocate. She was inducted into the Iowa Women's Hall of Fame.

== Biography ==
Cunningham was born on February 19, 1890, in Kansas City, Missouri, to parents Emma and George Ryland McKean. Cunningham received most of her early education in Natchez, Mississippi. In 1918, she married Edward Cunningham. Her first job was working for South West Bell Telephone Company, where she became acting manager. After Edward Cunningham died, she moved to Des Moines, Iowa, and worked at D. J. Joint Stock Land Bank, and later the V. U. Sigler Investment Company. Cunningham was elected the president of the Iowa Federation of Business and Professional Women for 1928. She is credited with convincing the National Federation of Business and Professional Women's Clubs to support the Equal Rights Amendment.

In 1943, Cunningham enlisted in the Women's Army Corps. After completing officer training in Fort Oglethorpe, Georgia, she served for nine years. After being discharged, she worked at the Veteran's Memorial Auditorium for several years, managing records of veterans in Iowa and planning Memorial and Veterans' Day services. She worked for many years with the American Legion. In 1978, she was appointed to the Iowa Commission on the Status of Women, and two years later, Cunningham was inducted into the Iowa Women's Hall of Fame. Cunningham posthumously received the Iowa National Guard's Distinguished Service Medal.
