= Mildred Hope Fisher Wood =

American educator (1920–2014)

Mildred Hope Fisher Wood (born Mildred Hope Fisher; April 19, 1920 – July 6, 2014) was an American teacher and a pioneer in special education. Wood was also an author and newspaper column writer. She received multiple honors.

== Early life and education ==
Fisher was born in Alta, Iowa on April 19, 1920, to Jessie and Hazel David Fisher. She spent her time as a child in multiple small farms by the Des Moines River. She attended Humboldt High School, and in 1937 she went to the University of Northern Iowa, where she met her future husband, William O. Wood, on her first day of class.

== Career ==
Fisher began teaching in 1939, and during that year she taught three students that were sisters and one of them had trouble with reading. The student had issues with her vision and hearing. Wood said, "I couldn't teach that child one thing that year." Her failure to teach the student led to her starting a career in special education when that field was just beginning. After a short period of teaching, Fisher became a speech therapist. Fisher married William Wood on June 23, 1940 in Renwick, Iowa.

Wood earned a BA degree in 1956, a MA degree in 1962, and an Ed.S. degree from the University of Northern Iowa. She completed post-graduate work at Syracuse University and the University of Oregon, receiving a Doctorate of Education in 1970 from the University of Indiana. She helped develop ways to determine if a student has a learning disability and also created methods to teach those students. Wood started and taught learning-disability courses, the first such courses of the time, to prospective teachers at the University of Northern Iowa. She was in charge of several hundred workshops for teachers, principals, parents, psychologists, and juvenile offenders.

She was one of the people who founded the Iowa Learning Disabilities Association, while also being a board member and president of the association. In a column for the Waterloo Courier titled "Parents and Learning Disabilities", she gave advice to parents. The column was written by her for almost 8 years, and it was published as a book, Handful of Popcorn, for parents with children that have Attention deficit hyperactivity disorder. She was a co-author of a diagnostic test for children in preschool.

== Honors ==
Wood was appointed to the Governor's Task Force on Education, which is the highest honor given by the Commission of Persons with Disabilities "for significantly enhancing the empowerment and employment of individuals with disabilities". The Iowa Association for Children and Youth with Learning Disabilities awarded her The President's Award. In 2011, Wood was inducted into the Iowa Women's Hall of Fame and later won a 2012 UNI Outstanding Alumnus Award.

== Death ==
Wood died on July 6, 2014. She was buried at Greenwood Cemetery in Cedar Falls, Iowa.
