= Poet Laureate of Iowa =

The poet laureate of Iowa is the poet laureate for the U.S. state of Iowa. The position was created July 1, 1999 by Subchapter 303.89 of the Iowa Code with a two-year renewable term.

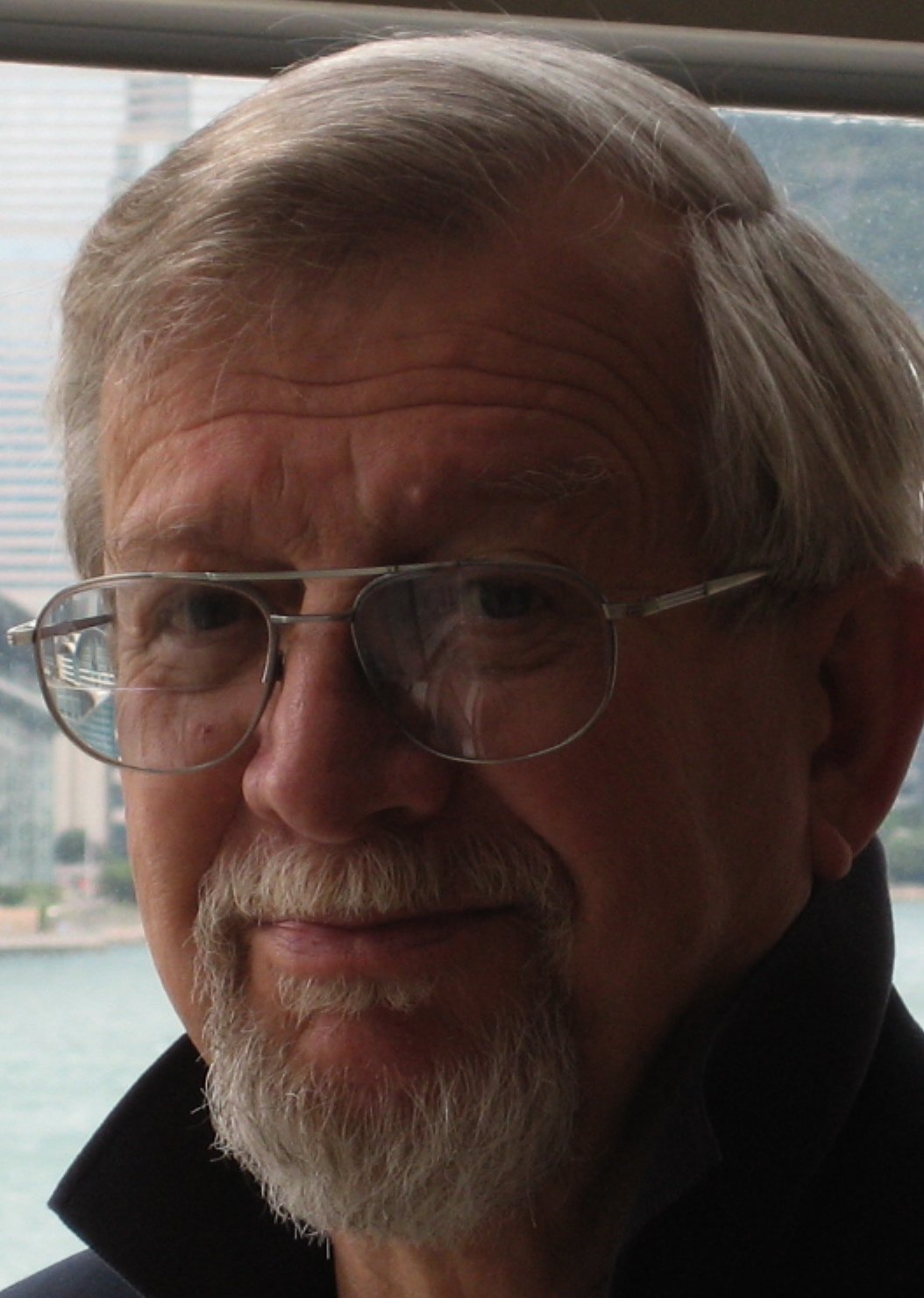
Robert P. Dana was poet laureate in 2004.

== List of poets laureate ==
- Marvin Bell (2000–04)
- Robert Dana (2004–08)
- Mary Swander (2009–19)
- Debra Marquart (2019–23)
- Vince Gotera (2024–26)

== See also ==
- Poet laureate
- List of U.S. state poets laureate
- United States Poet Laureate
