= Evelyne Jobe Villines =

American disability rights advocate

Evelyne Jobe Villines (February 11, 1930 – September 30, 2017) was an American disability rights advocate and political activist who had Poliomyelitis. Villines worked for both the state of Iowa and the federal government as an advocate. The Des Moines Register called her a "nationally known spokeswoman for the disabled" in 1992.

== Early life ==
Villines was born in Siam, Iowa. She had a brother named Ronald Jobe. At the age of 3, she contracted Poliomyelitis. When she first went to school, she was sent home with a comment from the teacher who said, "I don't have time to teach a handicapped child." Her father was the mayor and her uncle the president of the school board, both of whom helped her stay in school. When she turned 9, she was placed in the Crippled Children's Hospital in Iowa City, and she remained there until she was 16 years old. At the hospital, she was punished for crying. She, and other patients in the hospital were "paraded naked in front of medical students 'as the possessors of warped and crippled bodies.'" She had 14 surgeries to improve her chances of being able to walk while she was a teenager. Villines had the lead role in her high school's opera performance, however, she was only allowed to sing from backstage and another girl played her role for the audience. As a young person, Villines said she was motivated to succeed because of her grandmother who she helped her see that she could become a leader.

== Life and career ==
Villines served for multiple committees during her career. From 1965 to 1975, she was the executive secretary of the Iowa Governor's Committee on Employment of the Handicapped. On the committee, she worked to educate others about what people with disabilities can do and also to work towards greater public accessibility. She was elected president of the Iowa Rehabilitation Association in 1968. In 1971, she named the chair of the women's division for the Easter Seal Campaign in Polk County. She was honored with the National Award of Gallantry from the Easter Seal Society in 1977.

She then became the Director of Development at Iowa Lutheran Hospital in Des Moines until 1979. After that, she transferred to the Easter Seals Society of Iowa, Inc. as the Director of the Client Assistance Program from until 1991. During her time at the Easter Seals Society of Iowa, Inc., she became a motivational speaker, presenting her famous "In the Name of Love" speech to various international organizations. In 1994, President Bill Clinton assigned her to be a member of the Purchase from People Who are Blind or Severely Disabled, where she remained for 5 years before being reassigned for another 5 years in 1999. She was invited by President George H. W. Bush to the signing of the Americans with Disabilities Act of 1990 to be a witness. Villines died on September 30, 2017, at the age of 87. She spent 20 years helping a non-profit organization that helps people with disabilities get jobs called SourceAmerica.

== Personal life ==
Villines had 2 daughters named Chris and Julia. Her son, Wes Ferguson, died in 2009. Villines has shared that the first time "she felt whole, not disabled" was when she held her first child in her arms after giving birth.

Villines died at Mercy Hospice in Johnston, Iowa on September 30, 2017.

== Legacy ==
Villines was inducted into the National Hall of Fame for Persons with Disabilities in 1986. In 1994, Iowa state placed her into the Iowa Women's Hall of Fame. in 1995, the National Industries for the Blind created an award in Vilines' name for excellence in the workplace. In 2000, she was recognized as the Woman of the Year by Metro Women's Network of Greater Des Moines. Also in 2000, she was awarded the Medtronic Full Life Award. The National Industries for the Blind's headquarters in Vienna, Virginia were renamed the Evelyn Jobe Villines Training Center in 2004.

For serving 20 years at SourceAmerica, the organization named an award after Villines called the Evelyne Villines Award. This award is to recognize leaders in movements.
