= Agnes Samuelson =

American educator and school superintendent (1887–1963)

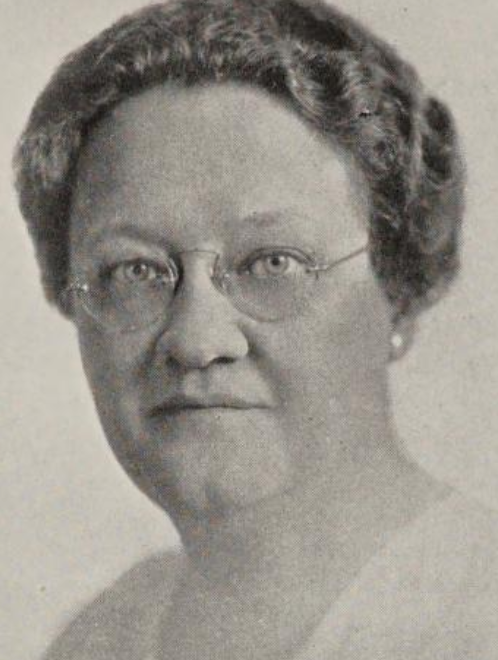
- Agnes Samuelson, from a 1935 publication of the US Department of the Interior

State Superintendent of Public Instruction
- In office 1926–1938

Personal details
- Born: April 14, 1887 Shenandoah, Iowa
- Died: May 12, 1963 (aged 76) Des Moines, Iowa
- Occupation: Educator

Agnes Mathilda Samuelson (April 14, 1887 – May 12, 1963) was an American educator and a state superintendent in public schools. She worked to provide equal education for all students in Iowa. She was posthumously inducted into the Iowa Women's Hall of Fame in 1976 and a Des Moines elementary school was named after her.

== Early life and career ==
Samuelson was born on April 14, 1887, in Shenandoah, Iowa, and her parents were Sven August Samuelson and Alvida (Johnson) Samuelson, who both immigrated from Sweden to the United States. She was the oldest of 7 children. Samuelson graduated from high school in 1904 with a dream to be a teacher because she had experience helping Swedish immigrants learn American customs and language. After completing an 11 month long course at the Western Normal College in Shenandoah in 1905, she started her teaching career in 1906 at a one-room schoolhouse in the country, two miles from Shenandoah. During the next two years, Samuelson taught at multiple schools in southwest Iowa, later becoming a principal and teacher at a high school in Silver City, Iowa. In 1908, her father died which made her become the main income earner in her family, making her more sensitive to the fact that male teachers received higher salaries.

From 1911 to 1913, Samuelson continued her education at the University of Nebraska and later became superintendent of public schools in Yorktown, Iowa, in 1913. In 1915, she successfully campaigned to become a Page County Superintendent of Schools. She provided rural schools with more new curricular education during that time, ensured that schoolbooks were available countywide, and helped advance teachers by starting summer schools and institutes. Samuelson became an extension professor of rural education in 1923 at the Iowa State Teachers College and continued to help rural children receive equal education while in that position. She attended the State University of Iowa, receiving a B. A. in 1925 and a M. A in 1928.

In 1926, while Samuelson was a student and an extension professor, she ran for State Superintendent of Public Instruction and won the Republican nomination against May E. Francis. Samuelson was re-elected in 1930 and 1934. She held the position for 12 years. In 1935, she was elected as president of the National Education Association. After deciding not to run for another term as Superintendent of Public Instruction in 1938, Samuelson became the executive secretary of the Iowa State Teachers Association. She left the association in 1945 to travel to the headquarters of the National Education Association in Washington, D.C., so that she could become assistant editor of the organization's journal and to become the associate director of American Education Week.

Samuelson retired in 1952 and moved back to Iowa to live in Des Moines. After her retirement, she wrote books and compiled a school manual and service for the Governor's Commission on Senior Citizens.

== Death ==
Samuelson died on May 12, 1963, in Des Moines, Iowa, from cancer after being ill for over a year. The funeral service was held at First Lutheran Church in Des Moines, Iowa, and she was buried at Rose Hill Cemetery in Shenandoah, Iowa.

== Honors and legacy ==
Samuelson ensured that all Iowa children would receive equal education regardless of their property wealth in their home school district. A Des Moines elementary school was named Samuelson School in her honor. In 1976, Samuelson was posthumously inducted into the Iowa Women's Hall of Fame.
