= List of mayors of Iowa City =

The following is a list of mayors of Iowa City, Iowa, United States.

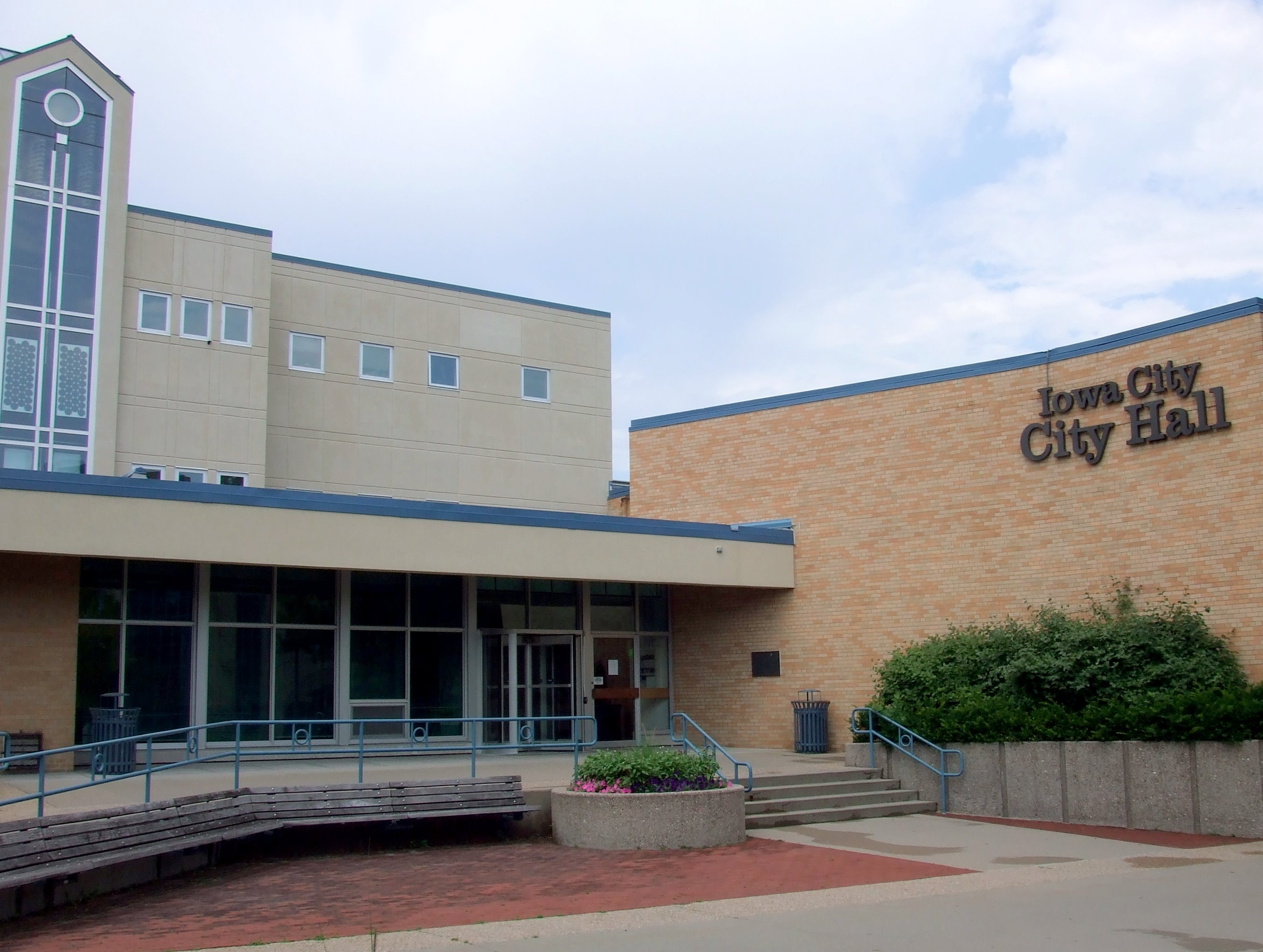
City hall building in Iowa City (photo 2008)

- Jacob P. DeForest, 1853
- Joseph E. Fales, 1854
- G.D. Woodin, 1855
- John Carlton, 1856
- Morgan Reno, 1857
- Charles Ransom, 1858
- Moses Morseman, 1859
- Peter Dey, 1860
- G.W. Clark, 1861
- G.H. Collins, 1862
- Joel Buttles, 1863
- George W. McCleary, 1864-1868
- F.H. Lee, 1869-1870
- S.E. Paine, 1871-1873
- Moses Bloom, 1874
- Jacob Ricord, 1875, 1878
- Henry Morrow, 1876
- Frederick Theobald, 1877
- Matthew Cavanagh, 1879
- William A. Morrison, 1880-1881
- J.J. Holmes, 1882-1883, 1887
- C.M. Reno, 1884-1885, 1889, 1891, 1895
- J.M.B. Letovsky, 1886
- D.S. Barber, 1887-1888
- Chas. Lewis, 1893
- Frank Stebbins, 1897-1904, 1917-1919
- Geo. W. Ball, 1905-1908
- Ralph Otto, 1909-1910
- George W. Koontz, 1911-1916
- W.H. Bailey, 1919
- Ingalls Swisher, 1919-1921
- Emma J. Harvat, 1922-1924
- John Carroll, 1925-1932
- Thomas Martin, 1935-1936
- Myron Walker, 1937-1938
- Henry Willenbrock, 1939-1942
- Wilber Teeters, 1943-1946
- William Holland, 1951-1953
- LeRoy Mercer, 1954-1957, 1962
- Louis Loria, 1958
- Philip Morgan, 1959
- J.R. Thornberry, 1960
- Thelma Lewis, 1961
- Dorr Hudson, 1962
- Fred Doderer, 1962-1963
- Richard Burger, 1964-1965
- William Hubbard, 1966-1967
- Loren Hickerson, 1968-1971
- C.L. Brandt, 1972-1973
- Edgar Czarnecki, 1974-1975
- Mary Neuhauser, 1976-1977, 1982-1983
- Robert Vevera, 1978-1979
- John Balmer, 1980-1981
- John A. McDonald, 1984-1985, 1988-1991
- Darrell Courtney, 1992-1993
- Susan Horowitz, 1994-1995
- Naomi Novick, 1996-1997
- Ernest W. Lehman, 1998-2005
- Ross Wilburn, 2006-2007
- Regenia Bailey, 2008-2009
- Matt Hayek, c.2011
- Bruce Teague, 2018-present

== See also ==
- Iowa City history
