= Ruth Bluford Anderson =

Social worker and professor

- Born: Ruth Bluford; October 28, 1921; Braden, Oklahoma, United States
- Died: January 22, 2013 (aged 91); Waterloo, Iowa, United States
- Education: University of California, Berkeley; Columbia University School of Social Work
- Occupations: social worker and professor
- Employer(s): Social Worker: Black Hawk County, Iowa Department of Public Welfare; Professor: Wartburg College; University of Northern Iowa
- Spouses: Everett McKinnis (m. 1946; div. 1959) Danny Oliver (m. 1961; div. 1964) James C. Anderson (m. 1968)
- Children: 2 sons, 5 stepchildren
- Parents: Roy Bluford (father); Josie Bluford (mother)
- Awards: Iowa Women's Hall of Fame

Ruth Bluford Anderson (October 28, 1921 – January 22, 2013) was an American social worker and professor at the University of Northern Iowa (UNI).

== Biography ==
Roy and Josie Bluford, Oklahoma sharecroppers, had five children and Ruth was the oldest. The family moved from Oklahoma to Sioux City, Iowa when she was seven. Her father went to work at the Cudahy Packing Company. Her parents divorced in 1933. Her mother was unable to provide for the family on her earnings as a part time maid at a hotel and she went on pun Ic assistance.

She married Everett McKinnis in Reno, Nevada on February 19, 1946. They had two sons Dwayne and Keith. The couple divorced in 1959. She married Danny Oliver on September 23, 1961 and divorced in 1964. On June 8, 1968, she married James C. Anderson and became stepmother to five children. Her autobiography, From Mother’s Aid Child to University Professor: the autobiography of am American Black Woman was published in 1985.

=== Education ===
Anderson received her undergraduate education from University of California, Berkeley, Class of 1946. She was working for the Westchester County, New York Welfare Department when she earned a Master of Social Work in 1956 from the Columbia University School of Social Work.

=== Career ===
While married to McKinnis, she moved to Waterloo, Iowa and began working for the Black Hawk County, Iowa Department of Public Welfare until she began teaching at Wartburg College in 1967. Two years later, she began teaching social work at UNI. After not receiving tenure nor becoming a full professor, Anderson took legal action against UNI. She won the case in am out of court settlement which has been considered a victory for all female at Iowa public universities.

Anderson was elected to the Black Hawk County Board of Supervisors in 1988. Sue was the first African American woman in Iowa to do so.

== Honors and awards ==
Anderson was inducted into the Iowa Women's Hall of Fame in 1982. Simpson College awarded her a Doctor of Humane Letters in 1990. The National Association of Social Workers awarded her a lifetime achievement award in 2012. In 1996, she was inducted into the Iowa African American Hall of Fame.
