= Peter A. Dey =

American politician (1825–1911)

Peter Anthony Dey
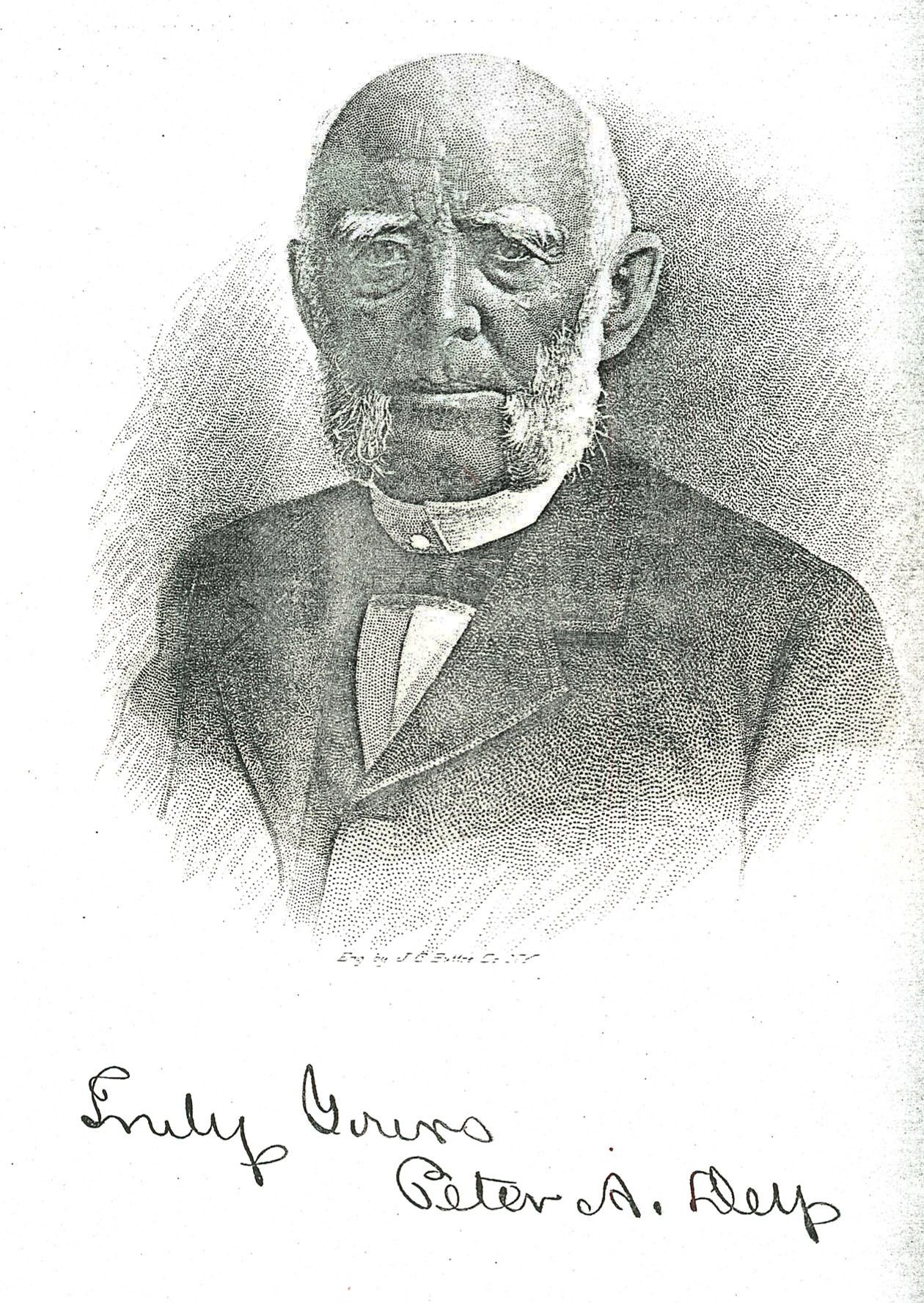
- 1911 Peter A Dey Obituary picture
- Born: 1825; Romulus, Seneca County, New York
- Died: 1911; Iowa City, Iowa
- Occupations: Civil engineer, railroad executive, banker
- Known for: Survey of the Union Pacific Railroad
- Spouse: Catherine Thompson (m. 1856)
- Children: Six

Peter Anthony Dey (1825–1911) was born at Romulus, Seneca County, New York on January 27, 1825. His father was Dr. Philip Dey, a son of Theunis Dey, Colonel of a New Jersey regiment in the Revolutionary war. Dey attended Seneca Falls Academy until 1840, when he entered Geneva College at Geneva, New York, graduating in 1844. He studied law until 1846 when he switched over to civil engineering. His first engagement was for surveying part of the right of way for the New York and Erie Railroad. For the next three years, Dey worked on the Delaware and Susquehanna rivers in Orange County, N.Y., and in Pike and Susquehanna counties in Pennsylvania. In 1849, he was hired by New York state to help rebuild the Cayuga and Seneca Canal locks in Seneca Falls. Then he worked on the Erie Canal at Port Byron.

In 1850, Dey assisted in the laying out and in the construction of the Michigan Southern railway, in charge of the construction of a division of that railroad in the vicinity of La Porte, Indiana. In the fall of 1852, he joined the Chicago and Rock Island railroad and was in charge of division work from Peru to Sheffield, Illinois. Dey was engaged in various railway construction enterprises in Illinois until 1853 when he relocated to Iowa City. In 1853 he moved to Iowa City, Iowa and continued his activities as a civil engineer. Dey was also division engineer for the construction of the Mississippi and Missouri Railroad Company (M&M) which ran from Davenport to Council Bluffs.

Dey married Catherine Thompson (1834–1899) of Connecticut at the Trinity Church in Buffalo on Oct. 23, 1856.; they had six children. In the winter of 1856, he rejoined the Rock Island railroad company, building its rail line west to Kellogg. Dey became mayor of Iowa City in 1860.

In 1862 Dey explored locations for the future Union Pacific Railroad working for Thomas C. Durant. Dey became chief engineer of the railroad until he was replaced by Grenville Dodge.

In 1864, Dey retired from his railroad interests and entered the banking industry at his home town, Iowa City, Iowa. Dey became president of the First National Bank of Iowa City, serving in that capacity until his death in 1911.

In 1872, Dey was one of three commissioners that oversaw the construction of the new Iowa State Capitol building at Des Moines, Iowa, a task that was not completed until 1884. In 1879, Dey was appointed railroad commissioner by Governor Gear and reappointed by Governors Sherman and Larrabee continuing thru 1896.

== Death and legacy ==
Dey was a member of the Iowa State Historical Society at Iowa City and for twelve years served as its president. Dey died at Iowa City, Iowa, on July 12, 1911.

Peter Anthony Dey's greatest contribution was the first survey of the Union Pacific Railroad. In Seneca Falls, New York, the name of the street connecting the residential area along the Seneca River in “the Flats” with Cayuga Street was named Dey Street in his honor until it was submerged in 1915 when "the water level of the reconstructed Cayuga-Seneca Canal was raised by the artificial lake now known as Van Cleef Lake."

== See also ==
- List of mayors of Iowa City
