= Jessie M. Parker =

American politician and educator

Iowa Superintendent of Public Instruction
- In office January 1939 – December 31, 1954

Winnebago County, Iowa Superintendent of Schools
- In office 1915–1927

Personal details
- Born: February 25, 1879 Black Hawk County, Iowa, US
- Died: May 1, 1959 (aged 80) Lake Mills, Iowa, US
- Education: Iowa State Normal School; Valparaiso University; Des Moines University
- Profession: Educator and education administrator

Jessie M. Parker (February 25, 1879 – May 1, 1959) was an American politician, educator, and education administrator. She was the Iowa superintendent of public instruction for fifteen years.

== Early life ==
Parker was born on February 25, 1879, in Black Hawk County, Iowa. Her parents were Martha J. (née Knapp) and Frederick H. Parker. Her family moved to Lake Mills, Iowa public elementary and secondary schools, graduating in 1896.

She graduated from Iowa State Normal School. She then attended Grinnell College, where she studied music. She received a Bachelor of pedagogy degree from Valparaiso University, and a Bachelor of Arts from Des Moines University. She was a member of Phi Theta Kappa.

== Career ==
In 1898, Parker became an elementary teacher in Lake Mills. Later, the taught eighth grade and was principal of the Lake Mills High School. She successfully ran for the Winnebago County Superintendent of Schools, serving from 1915 to 1927.

She became Iowa's rural school supervisor and the inspector for Iowa's standard rural schools in 1927. On November 8, 1938, she was elected the Iowa superintendent of public instruction as a Republican and was reelected in 1942, 1946, and 1950. She served from January 1939 to December 31, 1954. Under her administration, she consolidated rural school districts, introduced a new school accounting system, created curricular aids, and increased the requirements for teacher certification. She retired in December 1954.

She was second vice president of the National Council of Chief State School Officers and a member of the American Association of School Administrators and the National Education Association. She was a charter member of Iowa's chapter of Delta Kappa Gamma.

== Honors ==
Parker received an honorary LL.D. from Buena Vista College. In 1960, she was one of twenty national educators honored by the Shattuck School in Minnesota, during its centennial celebration. She was inducted into the Iowa Women's Hall of Fame in 1986. Iowa's Vocational Rehabilitation Building in Des Moines was renamed the Jessie Parker State Office Building in 1998.

== Personal life ==
Parker was a member of the Business and Professional Women's League of Des Moines, the Iowa Federation of Women's Clubs, the Order of the Eastern Star, and the 20th Century Club of Forest City. She was a trustee of the Iowa State Library board. She was a member of Asbury Methodist Church.

After she retired, she moved to Lake Mills, Iowa, where she lived with her sister. There, she served a term on Lake Mills Community School Board.

Parker died of cancer at her family homestead in Lake Mills on May 1, 1959. She was buried in the Sunnyside Cemetery in Lake Mills.
