= Penfield Books =

Penfield Books is a book publishing company that was founded in 1979 in Iowa City, Iowa by Joan Liffring-Zug Bourret and late husband John Zug. It was originally named Penfield Press.

Penfield Books and Penfield Press have published more than 110 books. Penfield Books has published many titles which promote understanding of ethnic culture primarily of northern and eastern European descent including historical books about the Amana Colonies of Iowa. Penfield has published titles about Grant Wood and brought back into a print select titles by Selma Ottilia Lovisa Lagerlöf, the first woman to win the Nobel Prize in Literature.

Many titles have received national and international awards. Several titles were awarded first and second place in the United States by the Independent Book Publishers Association.
