= Anna B. Lawther =

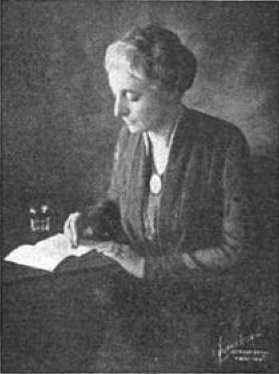
- Born: September 8, 1872; Dubuque, Iowa
- Died: October 21, 1957 (aged 85)
- Education: Bryn Mawr College
- Occupation: Suffragist

Anna Bell Lawther (September 8, 1872 - October 21, 1957) was a leader in the women's suffrage movement in the U.S. state of Iowa.

== Biography ==
Lawther was born in Dubuque, Iowa, the daughter of William Lawther and Annie Elizabeth (Bell) Lawther. She received her early education in the Dubuque public schools. She prepared for college at Miss Stevens' School at Germantown, Philadelphia, Pennsylvania, and received the B. A. degree from Bryn Mawr College in 1897. The following year, she became assistant bursar of Bryn Mawr College and from 1904 to 1905 she was warden of Merion Hall at Bryn Mawr and from 1907 to 1912 was the secretary of Bryn Mawr College. After resigning her position at her alma mater, Lawther returned to Iowa and became interested in local activities. During the referendum for equal suffrage in 1916 she was the chairman of the Dubuque County, Iowa Equal Suffrage Association and for the following three years was its president. During her term of office, Lawther was appointed by Governor Harding as a member of the Council of Defense. When suffrage was granted to the women of Iowa by the Thirty-Eighth General Assembly, Lawther was made the Democratic National Committeewoman for Iowa. Lawther Hall at the University of Northern Iowa was named in her honor. She also served on the state board of education.

== Bibliography ==
- Iowa. Secretary of State (1923). Official Register. Iowa General Assembly. STANFORD:36105014095553.
- Smith, Grace Partridge (1920). The Iowa Alumnus. Vol. XVIII (Public domain ed.). University of Iowa Association.
