= Mattoon, Wisconsin =

Mattoon, Wisconsin, in Shawano County Zip Code 54450
- Village
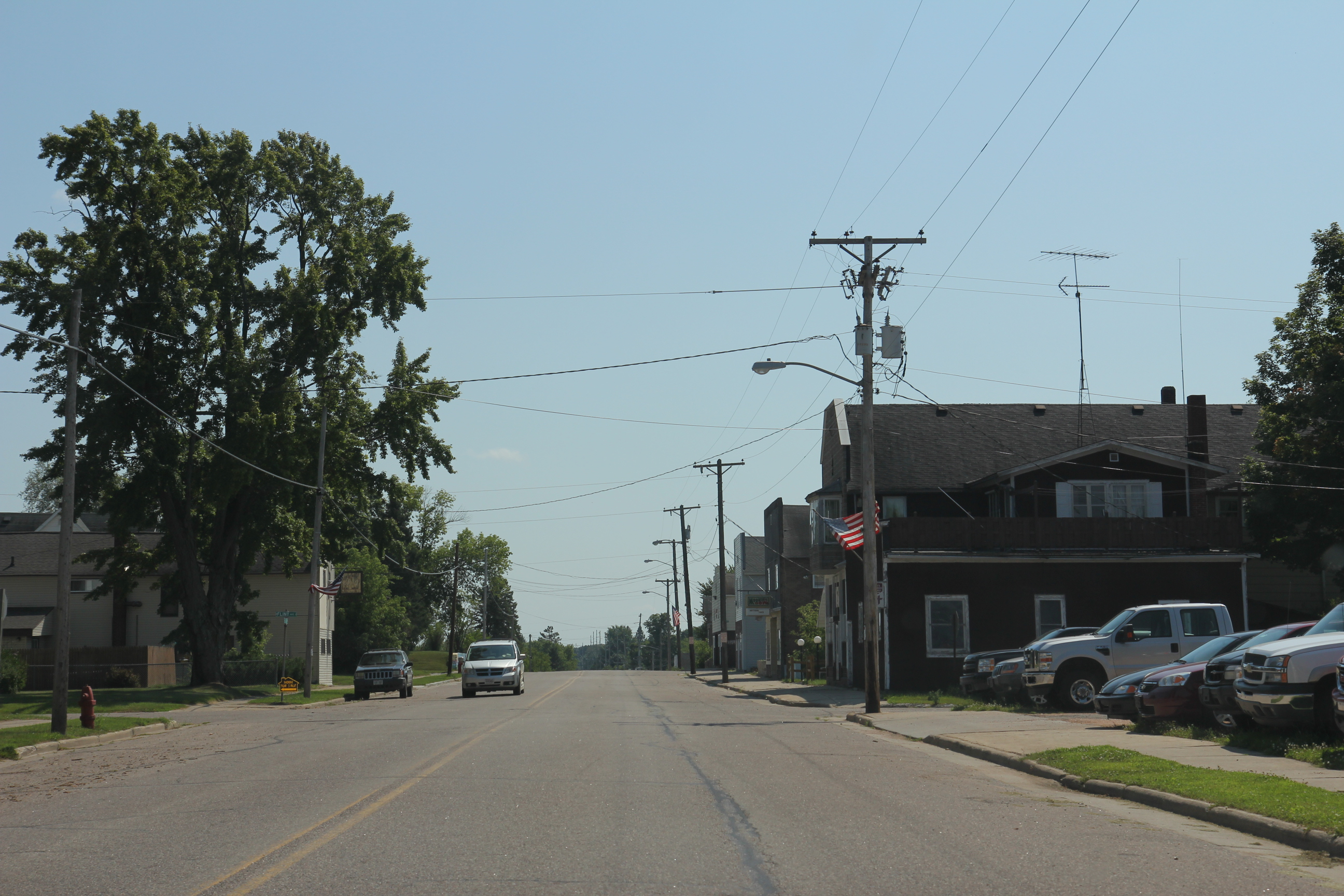
- Looking south in Mattoon

- Location of Mattoon in Shawano County, Wisconsin.
- Coordinates: 45°0′19″N 89°2′21″W
- Country: United States
- State: Wisconsin
- County: Shawano

Area
  - Total: 1.64 sq mi (4.25 km^{2})
  - Land: 1.64 sq mi (4.25 km^{2})
  - Water: 0 sq mi (0.00 km^{2})
- Elevation: 1,276 ft (389 m)

Population (2020)
  - Total: 357
  - Density: 218/sq mi (84.0/km^{2})
- Time zone: UTC-6 (Central (CST))
  - Summer (DST): UTC-5 (CDT)
- Area codes: 715 & 534
- FIPS code: 55-50000
- GNIS feature ID: 1569128
- Website: https://villageofmattoon.org/

Mattoon is a village in Shawano County, Wisconsin, United States. The population was 357 at the 2020 census.

== Geography ==
Mattoon is located at 45°0′19″N 89°2′21″W (45.005282, -89.039292).

According to the United States Census Bureau, the village has a total area of 1.64 square miles (4.25 km^{2}), all land.

== Demographics ==
Historical population
Census	Pop.	Note	%±
1910	868		—
1920	666		−23.3%
1930	508		−23.7%
1940	524		3.1%
1950	510		−2.7%
1960	435		−14.7%
1970	377		−13.3%
1980	382		1.3%
1990	431		12.8%
2000	466		8.1%
2010	438		−6.0%
2020	357		−18.5%
U.S. Decennial Census

=== 2010 census ===
As of the census of 2010, there were 438 people, 171 households, and 119 families living in the village. The population density was 267.1 inhabitants per square mile (103.1/km^{2}). There were 194 housing units at an average density of 118.3 per square mile (45.7/km^{2}). The racial makeup of the village was 82.6% White, 0.2% African American, 1.8% Native American, 1.6% Asian, 9.4% from other races, and 4.3% from two or more races. Hispanic or Latino of any race were 16.0% of the population.

There were 171 households, of which 32.7% had children under the age of 18 living with them, 50.9% were married couples living together, 12.3% had a female householder with no husband present, 6.4% had a male householder with no wife present, and 30.4% were non-families. 26.9% of all households were made up of individuals, and 14.6% had someone living alone who was 65 years of age or older. The average household size was 2.56 and the average family size was 3.03.

The median age in the village was 38 years. 23.5% of residents were under the age of 18; 9.7% were between the ages of 18 and 24; 25.8% were from 25 to 44; 22.6% were from 45 to 64; and 18.3% were 65 years of age or older. The gender makeup of the village was 51.1% male and 48.9% female.

=== 2000 census ===
As of the census of 2000, there were 466 people, 177 households, and 109 families living in the village. The population density was 285.3 people per square mile (110.4/km^{2}). There were 193 housing units at an average density of 118.2 per square mile (45.7/km^{2}). The racial makeup of the village was 95.06% White, 0.21% African American, 3.43% Native American, 0.43% from other races, and 0.86% from two or more races. Hispanic or Latino of any race were 0.43% of the population.

There were 177 households, out of which 32.2% had children under the age of 18 living with them, 48.6% were married couples living together, 9.0% had a female householder with no husband present, and 38.4% were non-families. 31.1% of all households were made up of individuals, and 19.2% had someone living alone who was 65 years of age or older. The average household size was 2.63 and the average family size was 3.31.

In the village, the population was spread out, with 28.5% under the age of 18, 9.4% from 18 to 24, 27.5% from 25 to 44, 20.8% from 45 to 64, and 13.7% who were 65 years of age or older. The median age was 36 years. For every 100 females, there were 93.4 males. For every 100 females age 18 and over, there were 92.5 males.

The median income for a household in the village was $34,375, and the median income for a family was $41,375. Males had a median income of $29,250 versus $21,944 for females. The per capita income for the village was $18,969. About 4.1% of families and 9.4% of the population were below the poverty line, including 7.9% of those under age 18 and 12.9% of those age 65 or over.

== Images ==
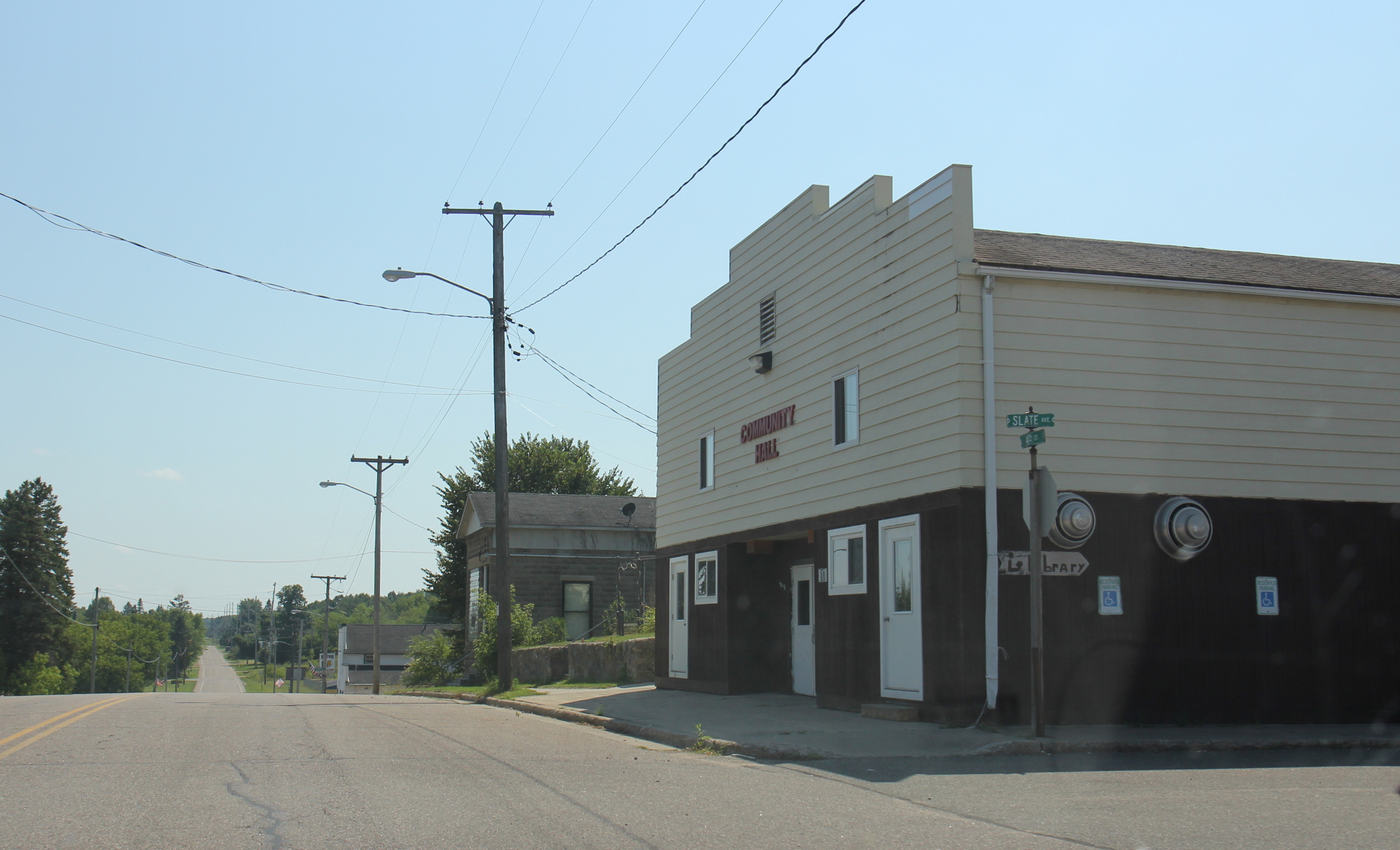
The community hall

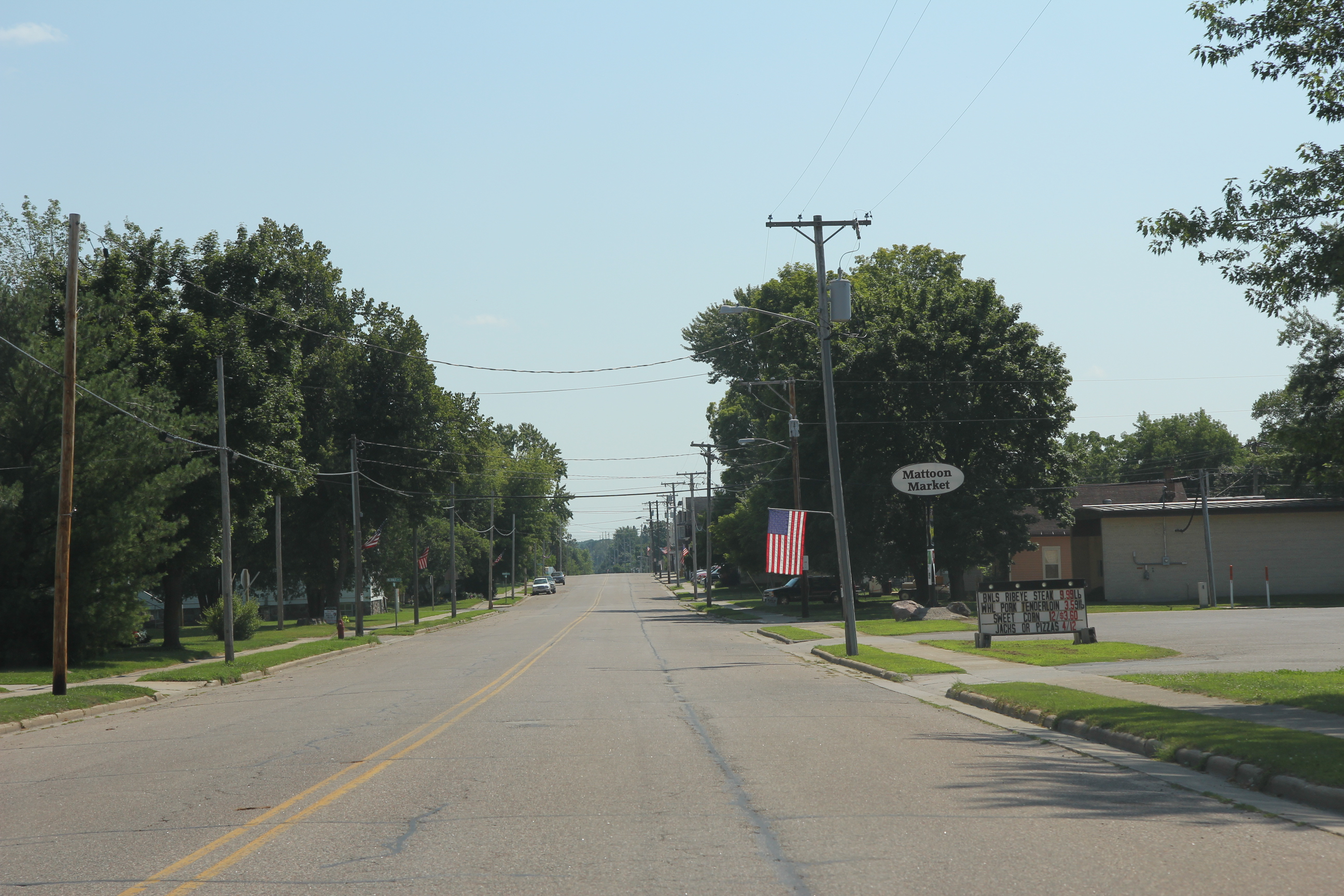
Downtown Mattoon looking south

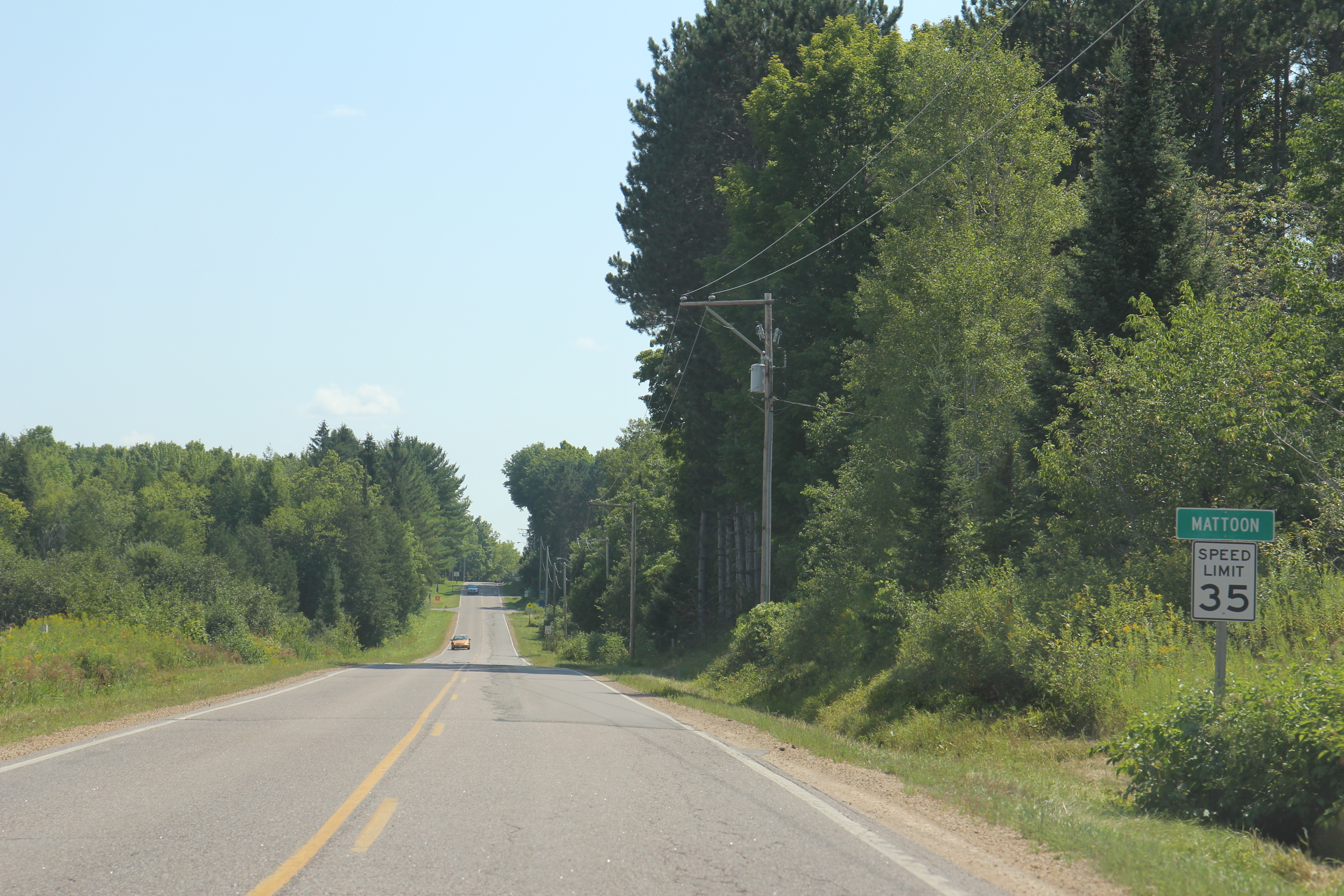
The sign for Mattoon looking south on County D
