= Juvenile Protective Association =

- Abbreviation: JPA
- Founded: 1901; 125 years ago
- Founder: Jane Addams
- Type: Non-profit organization
- Legal status: Charity
- Headquarters: 1707 N. Halsted, Chicago, IL, 60614
- Location: Chicago
- Region served: Chicago
- Staff: 26 (2016)
- Website: jpachicago.org

Juvenile Protective Association (JPA) is a private non-profit agency devoted to protecting children from abuse and neglect by providing intervention and treatment services to families in Chicago.

== History ==
Founded in Chicago in 1901 by Jane Addams and her colleagues, the Juvenile Court Committee (JCC) provided the first probation officers for the first Juvenile Court in the United States before this became a government function. In 1907 the JCC merged with the Juvenile Protection League, an organization devoted to preventing juvenile delinquency, and renamed itself the Juvenile Protective Association. From 1907 until the 1940s, JPA engaged in many studies examining such subjects as racism, child labor and exploitation, drug abuse and prostitution in Chicago and their effects on child development. Beginning in the 1940s under the leadership of Jessie Binford, JPA chose to concentrate on direct service and to help the most resistant clients with a strong outreach (home visiting) component. When Lewis Penner became executive director of JPA in 1952, he reformed the organization by hiring social workers holding professional master's degrees and focusing more on research and casework over social reform. In the 1960s, JPA participated with other child welfare agencies in establishing the Illinois Department of Children and Family Services (DCFS). In 1990, JPA made a strategic decision to focus on serving high-risk and vulnerable families with young children (age 0-5) to reduce the risk of maltreatment and provide help to vulnerable children early in life and maximize the impact of intervention on their developmental trajectory.

=== Mission ===
As a social welfare agency, JPA's mission is to protect and to promote the healthy development of children whose social and emotional well-being, or whose physical safety is in jeopardy either because of neglect or abuse at home or because of inimical interferences in the neighborhood and, when necessary, to provide for the rehabilitation of families for such children.

== Services and activities ==
Under the leadership of executive director Richard Calica, JPA offers psychological treatment to children and families with a history of abuse and neglect and to those at risk of falling into a cycle of abuse. The organization also offers consultation and training services to other public and private social service organizations, including the Illinois Department of Children and Family Services (DCFS). Its research department contributes to knowledge about child welfare and is currently participating in the U.S. Department of Health and Human Services's longitudinal study about the effects of different environments on child development, especially when children have been exposed to violence, poverty, substance abuse, or neglect.
