= Julia Addington =

American politician

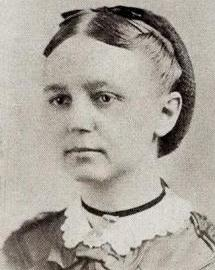
- Julia Addington in a photo published in 1911.

Superintendent of Schools for Mitchell County, Iowa
- In office 1869 – 1871 (retired)

Personal details
- Born: June 13, 1829 New York
- Died: September 21, 1875 (aged 46) Stacyville, Iowa
- Party: Bolter
- Parent(s): William. H. Addington Sr. Alvira Potter

Julia C. Addington (June 13, 1829 – September 21, 1875) was an American elected official in Iowa. She was the first woman elected to public office in Iowa, and may have been the first woman elected to public office in the United States.

== Life ==
Addington was the daughter of William. H. Addington Sr. and Alvira Potter. She was born in New York state. She came to Iowa from Wisconsin with her family in 1863 and taught school in Cedar Falls, Waterloo, Des Moines and at the Cedar Valley Seminary in Osage. Addington was elected Superintendent of Schools for Mitchell County in 1869. She had been acting school superintendent just prior to the election, completing the term of the previous holder of that position. Addington was elected as part of the "Bolter" faction of the Republican Party, who favoured Mitchell as the county seat. She received exactly the same number of votes as Republican candidate Milton N. Browne and the election was settled by flipping a coin. Because she was a woman, her election was not universally accepted, even though the Iowa attorney general Henry O'Connor ruled that her election was legal since there was no explicit requirement in the law for a candidate to be male. During her time in office, 17 new schools were built. She retired for health reasons in 1871.

Addington died at home in Stacyville at the age of 46.
