= Emma J. Harvat and Mary E. Stach House =

Historic house in Iowa, United States

- U.S. National Register of Historic Places
- U.S. Historic district – Contributing property
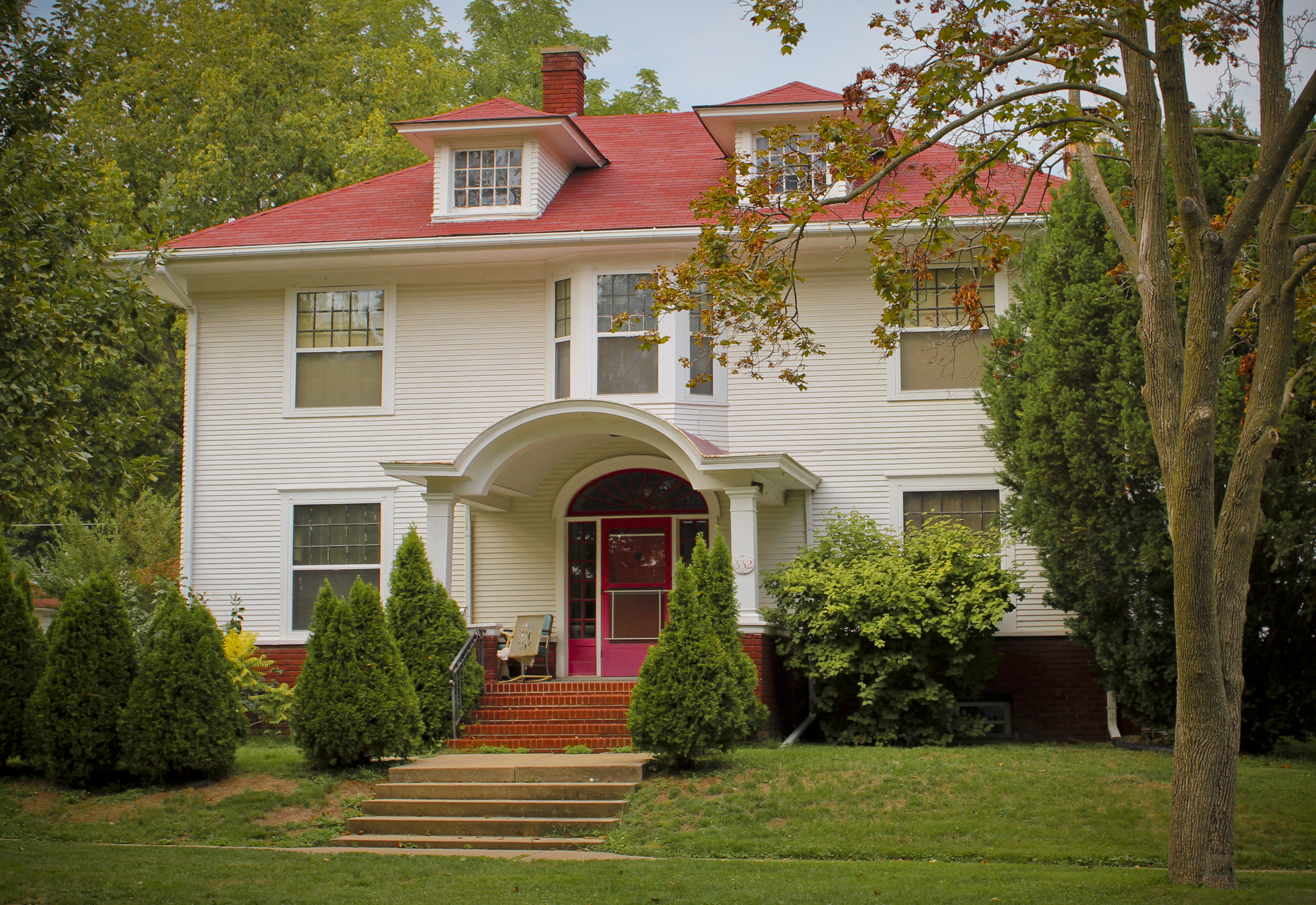

- Location within Iowa Location within the United States
- Location: 332 E. Davenport St. Iowa City, Iowa
- Coordinates: 41°39′57.49″N 91°31′49.53″W
- Area: less than one acre
- Built: 1918
- Architect: O.H. Carpenter
- Architectural style: Late 19th And 20th Century Revivals
- Part of: Gilbert-Linn Street Historic District (ID05000366)
- MPS: Iowa City MPS
- NRHP reference No.: 00000478
- Added to NRHP: May 11, 2000

The Emma J. Harvat and Mary E. Stach House, also known as the De Saint Victor House, was the home of Emma J. Harvat, who was the first female mayor of Iowa City, Iowa and the first female leader of a U.S. city with a population greater than 10,000. Harvat was a successful businesswoman who had become financially independent and retired to Iowa City at the age of 43. After arriving there she became partner in another business venture with Mary (May) Stach, establishing Harvat and Stach to sell women's clothing. Harvat and Stach had the house on Davenport Street built for them in 1919. The house was designed by Iowa City architect Orville H. Carpenter, incorporating a variety of historical revival styles, dominated by Colonial Revival.

== Description ==
The two-story wood-frame house is arranged as a compact rectangular mass, with a hipped rof. The entrance is centered on the front facade with an arched porch framing an arched transom over the front door, which is flanked by sidelights. The front (south) comprises three bays with wide sash windows in a 15-over-1 pattern and a centered projecting bay window over the front door. The roof features two hipped dormers. The house is sheathed in narrow clapboards and rests on a brick foundation. An extension on the east houses a sun room.

The interior is arranged around a central stair hall, with a vestibule and entry hall between the stairs and the front door. A dining room and a kitchen are to the left of the entry, from front to back, and front and back parlors on the right, with a study or breakfast room in the middle and the sun porch off the east side of the back parlor. The sun porch was originally to be unenclosed, and the back parlor was called the "sun parlor" on the original plans, though it was located on the northeast side of the house. The upstairs features four bedrooms and a bathroom, with one designated as a sleeping porch over the present back parlor on the original plans. The attic was not finished.

The Harvat-Stach House was individually listed on the National Register of Historic Places on May 11, 2000. In 2005 it and its garage were included as a contributing properties in the Gilbert-Linn Street Historic District.
