= Iowa Academy of Science =

Scientific association

Iowa Academy of Science logo.

The Iowa Academy of Science is the oldest existing scientific association in Iowa, founded in 1875. It was established to promote scientific research, science education, public understanding of science, and recognition of excellence. Its membership consists primarily of professional and academic scientists and science educators. It publishes the Journal of the Iowa Academy of Science twice a year, as well as the New Bulletin newsletter four times a year. It publishes the Iowa Science Teachers Journal electronically.
