= Mary Swander =

American author (born 1950)

- Born: November 5, 1950 (age 75)
- Occupation: Writer

Mary Swander (born November 5, 1950) is an American writer of drama, poetry and nonfiction. She holds dual citizenship in Ireland and the United States. Born in Carroll, Iowa and raised in Manning, Iowa, her ancestors immigrated to the United States during the Great Famine of Ireland. Swander taught for a decade on the island of Inishbofin, County Galway.

Swander has published books of poetry and nonfiction as well as essays, magazine articles, individual poems and radio commentaries including in National Public Radio, The Nation, The New York Times Magazine, and Poetry Magazine. She is best known for her poetry book Driving the Body Back and for her memoirs Out of this World and The Desert Pilgrim. Other books include three books of poetry, Heaven-and-Earth House, Driving the Body Back, and Succession. She served as the Poet Laureate of Iowa from 2009 to 2019.

Swander has also co-authored a musical, Dear Iowa, with composer Christopher Frank, which has been produced across the Midwest and on Iowa Public Television.

Her awards include a Whiting Award, a National Endowment for the Arts grant for the Literary Arts, the Carl Sandburg Literary Award, and the Nation-Discovery Award. A graduate of the Iowa Writers' Workshop at the University of Iowa, she is a Distinguished Professor of English at Iowa State University. Swander has written ekphrastic poetry for University Museums' poetry collection inspired by the Art on Campus Collection at Iowa State University. With an endowment from the Iowa Arts Council granted in 2009, she started a poetry website for Iowans called "The Iowa Literary Community".
