= Harvey House (disambiguation) =

Harvey House was a hotel and restaurant chain operated by the Fred Harvey Company in Santa Fe Railroad stations in the Western United States.

Harvey House may also refer to:

== Harvey House buildings ==
- Barstow Harvey House in Barstow, California
- Harvey House at the Santa Fe Depot (San Bernardino, California) in San Bernardino, California
- Harvey House at the El Garces Hotel in Needles, the Mojave Desert, California
- La Posada Hotel (Harvey House) and gardens in Winslow, Arizona
- Belen Harvey House, in Belen, New Mexico; listed on the NRHP in Valencia County
- Harvey Hotel (Gallup, New Mexico), New Mexico; listed on the NRHP in McKinley County, New Mexico
- Harvey House at the Old Santa Fe Depot of Guthrie in Guthrie, Oklahoma
- Waynoka Santa Fe Depot and Harvey House in Waynoka, Oklahoma; listed on the NRHP in Woods County, Oklahoma.
- Harvey House (Florence, Kansas) in Florence, Kansas; listed on the NRHP in Marion County, Kansas
- Castañeda Hotel in Las Vegas, New Mexico. Built in 1898 and finished in 1899.
- La Fonda Hotel in Santa Fe, New Mexico was purchased in 1925 by the Atchison, Topeka & Santa Fe Railroad and operated as one of the famed Harvey Houses.

== Harvey House ==
Harvey House may also refer to other places in the United States:

- Harvey-Niemeyer House, Florence, Arizona, listed on the NRHP in Pinal County, Arizona
- Leo M. Harvey House, in the Hollywood Hills of Los Angeles, California, designed by John Lautner
- William H. Harvey House, Windsor, Connecticut, listed on the NRHP in Windsor, Connecticut
- Fred Harvey House (Leavenworth, Kansas), listed on the NRHP in Leavenworth County, Kansas
- John Harvey House (Madisonville, Kentucky), listed on the NRHP in Hopkins County, Kentucky
- Harvey House (Monroe, Louisiana), listed on the NRHP in Ouachita Parish, Louisiana
- John Harvey House (Detroit, Michigan) in Detroit, Michigan; listed on the NRHP in Wayne County, Michigan
- John Harvey House (Madisonville, Kentucky), listed on the NRHP in Hopkins County, Kentucky
- Finks-Harvey Plantation, Roanoke, Missouri, listed on the NRHP in Howard County, Missouri
- Matthew Harvey House, Sutton, New Hampshire, listed on the NRHP in Merrimack County, New Hampshire
- Harvey Mansion, New Bern, North Carolina, listed on the NRHP in Craven County, North Carolina
- Eli Harvey House, Clarksville, Ohio, listed on the NRHP in Clinton County, Ohio, home of sculptor Eli Harvey
- William Harvey House, Chadds Ford, Pennsylvania, listed on the NRHP in southern Chester County, Pennsylvania
- Nathan Harvey House, Mill Hall, Pennsylvania, listed on the NRHP in Clinton County, Pennsylvania
- Peter Harvey House and Barn, Kennett Square, Pennsylvania, listed on the NRHP in southern Chester County, Pennsylvania
- Boyd-Harvey House, Knoxville, Tennessee, NRHP-listed
- Harvey House (Radford, Virginia), listed on the NRHP in Virginia
- Harvey House (Huntington, West Virginia), listed on the NRHP in Cabell County, West Virginia

== See also ==
- John Harvey House (disambiguation)
