= Eusebius Barnard =

American farmer, minister and abolitionist (1802–1865)

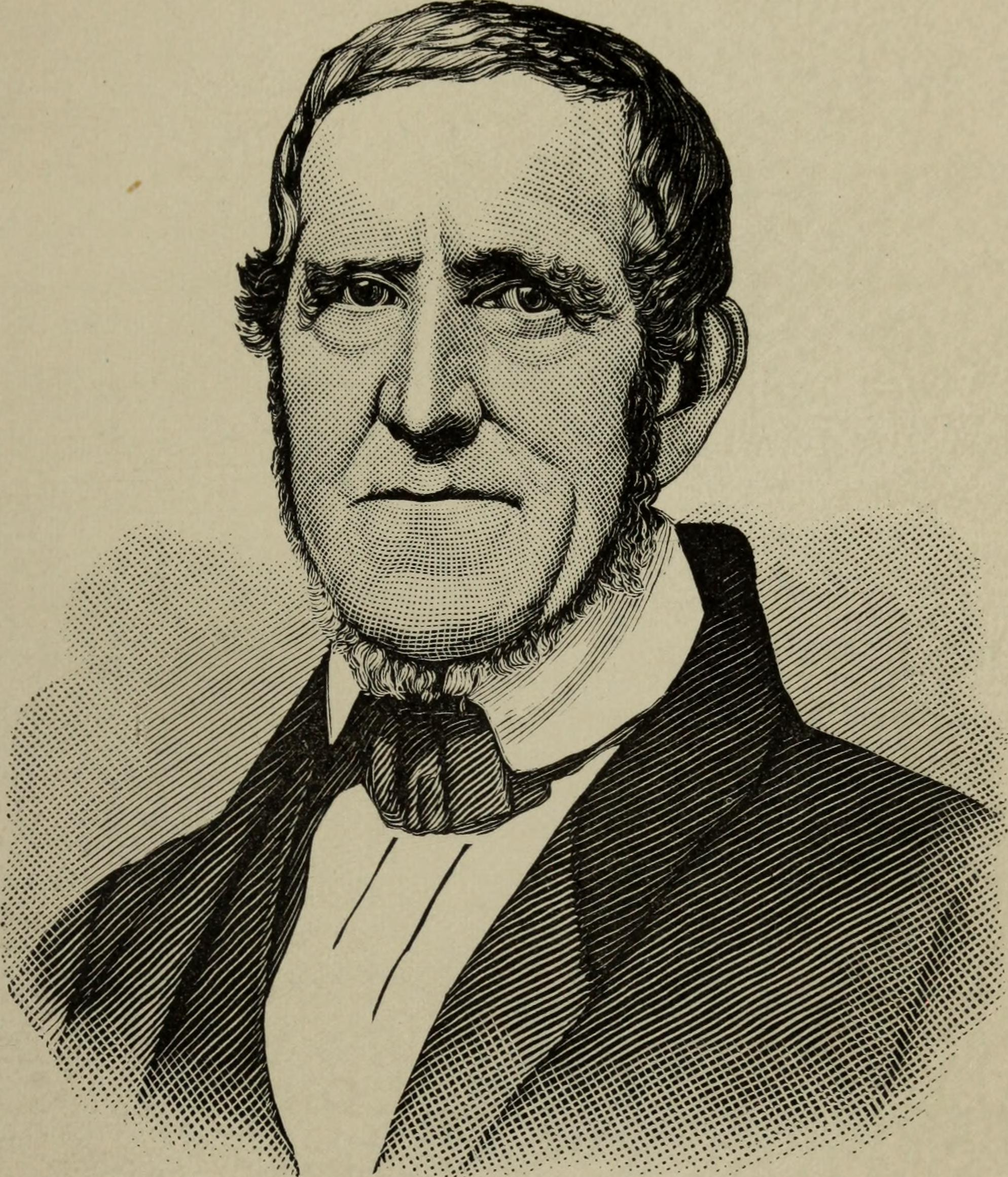
- Born: July 13, 1802; Chester County, Pennsylvania
- Died: October 2, 1865 (aged 63); Pocopson Township, Pennsylvania
- Occupations: Farmer, minister, station master on the Underground Railroad

Eusebius Barnard (July 13, 1802 – October 2, 1865) was an American farmer and station master on the Underground Railroad in Chester County, Pennsylvania, helping hundreds of fugitive slaves escape to freedom. A minister of the Progressive Friends and founding member of Longwood Meeting House, Barnard championed women’s rights, temperance, and abolition of slavery. A Pennsylvania state historical marker was placed outside his home in Pocopson Township on April 30, 2011.

== Biography ==
Born in Chester County in July 1802, Barnard was descended from English Quakers who settled the area in 1686. He attended the Westtown Boarding School and proved so gifted a student that his brother, Joseph Barnard, invited him to take over teaching the Locust Grove school. Eusebius was only 13 years old at the time. He left Westtown without finishing his formal education and thenceforth focused on farming in Pocopson Township, where his stone farmhouse still stands today.

Due to his outspoken abolitionism and other progressive views, Barnard was expelled from the Kennett Friends Meeting in 1852 along with William Barnard, Isaac Mendenhall, Isaac Meredith, and other reform-minded congregants. Combining with other Quaker dissidents, Eusebius Barnard became a minister and founding member of the Longwood Meeting of Progressive Friends in 1854. In addition to the abolition of slavery, he championed women’s suffrage and the temperance movement. From the early 1850s, Barnard was a member of the Locust Grove Lyceum, which met at the eponymous one-room schoolhouse to discuss literature, science, education, and issues of the day. He also signed the Petition for the Division of Pennsbury Township on November 3, 1848, which led to the formation of Pocopson Township.

The Underground Railroad was a family enterprise for Barnard. He and his sons and daughters provided shelter to hundreds of freedom seekers and, "at great risk to their own lives," guided them to their next station stop on the Underground Railroad. These stops were often houses in towns such as Strasburg, Newlin, East Bradford, or Uwchlan. The family sometimes aided large parties of up to 17 freedom seekers, including men, women, and children. Barnard's first wife, Sarah Painter Barnard (1804–1849), and his second wife, Sarah Marsh Barnard (1819–1887), were both daughters of prominent abolitionists and actively involved in conducting freedom seekers to safety. Eusebius and Sarah P. had eight children, of whom five survived to adulthood: Elizabeth, Minerva, Minerva, Hannah, Enos, Anna, Eusebius R., and Enos P.

Barnard died at his Pocopson home in October 1865. Eusebius, Sarah P., and Sarah M. are buried at Longwood Cemetery in Kennett Square.

== Legacy ==
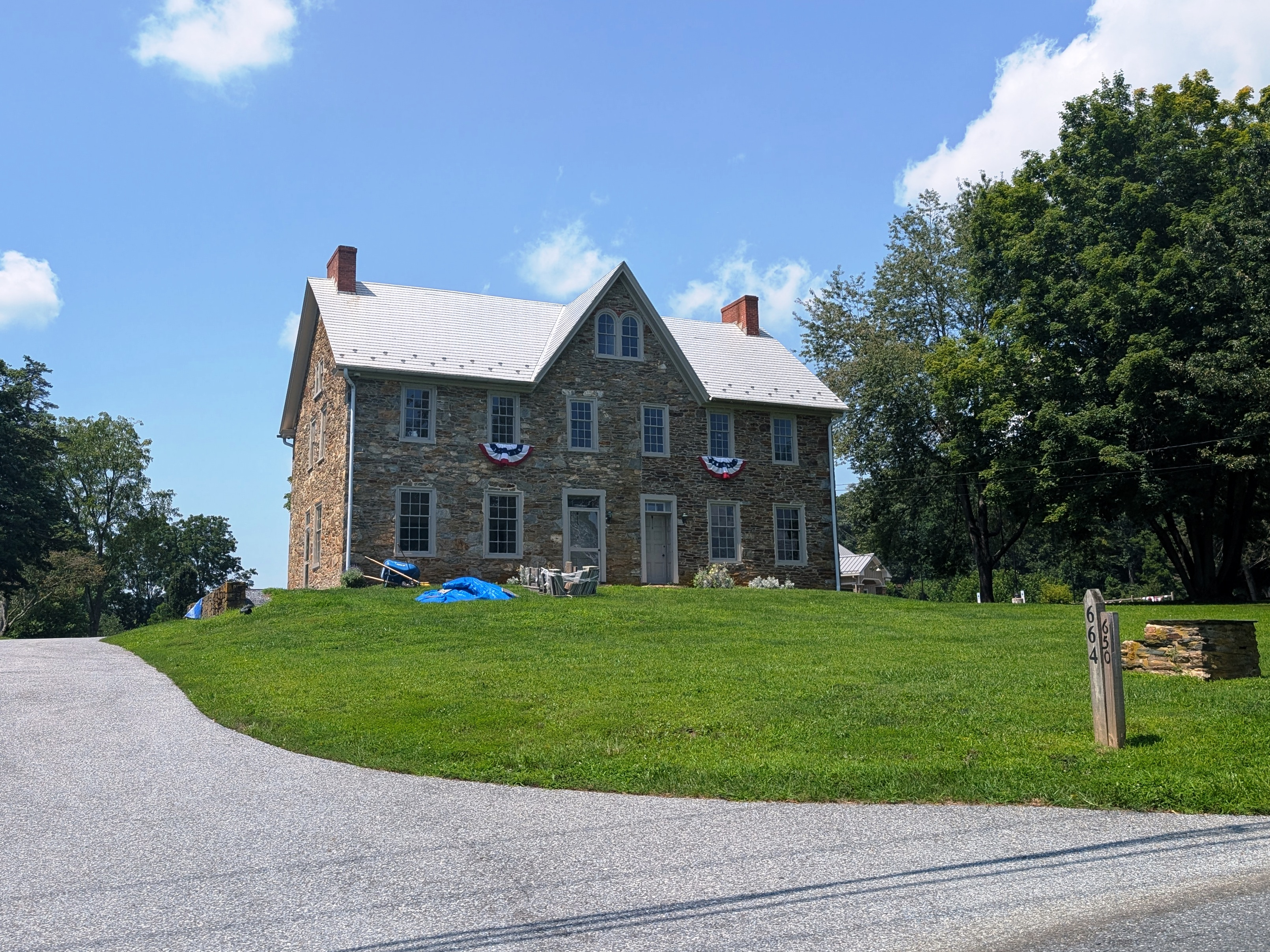
Eusebius Barnard House in Pocopson Township as seen in 2026

Built in the early 1800s on South Wawaset Road in Pocopson Township, the Eusebius Barnard House is a stone farmhouse that has been listed on the National Park Service's National Underground Railroad Network to Freedom since October 2022. The house had remained in the Barnard family until 1944, when descendants sold the property to the Dershimers, who subsequently sold it to the Chester County government in 1957. In October 2008, Chester County transferred ownership of the property and an accompanying 68 acres of land to Pocopson Township. The Kennett Underground Railroad Center and Museum is headquartered in Barnard's house.

A Pennsylvania state historical marker was placed by the road outside Barnard's home in Pocopson on April 30, 2011.

== See also ==
- List of Pennsylvania state historical markers in Chester County
