= Isaac Mendenhall =

American farmer and abolitionist (1806–1882)

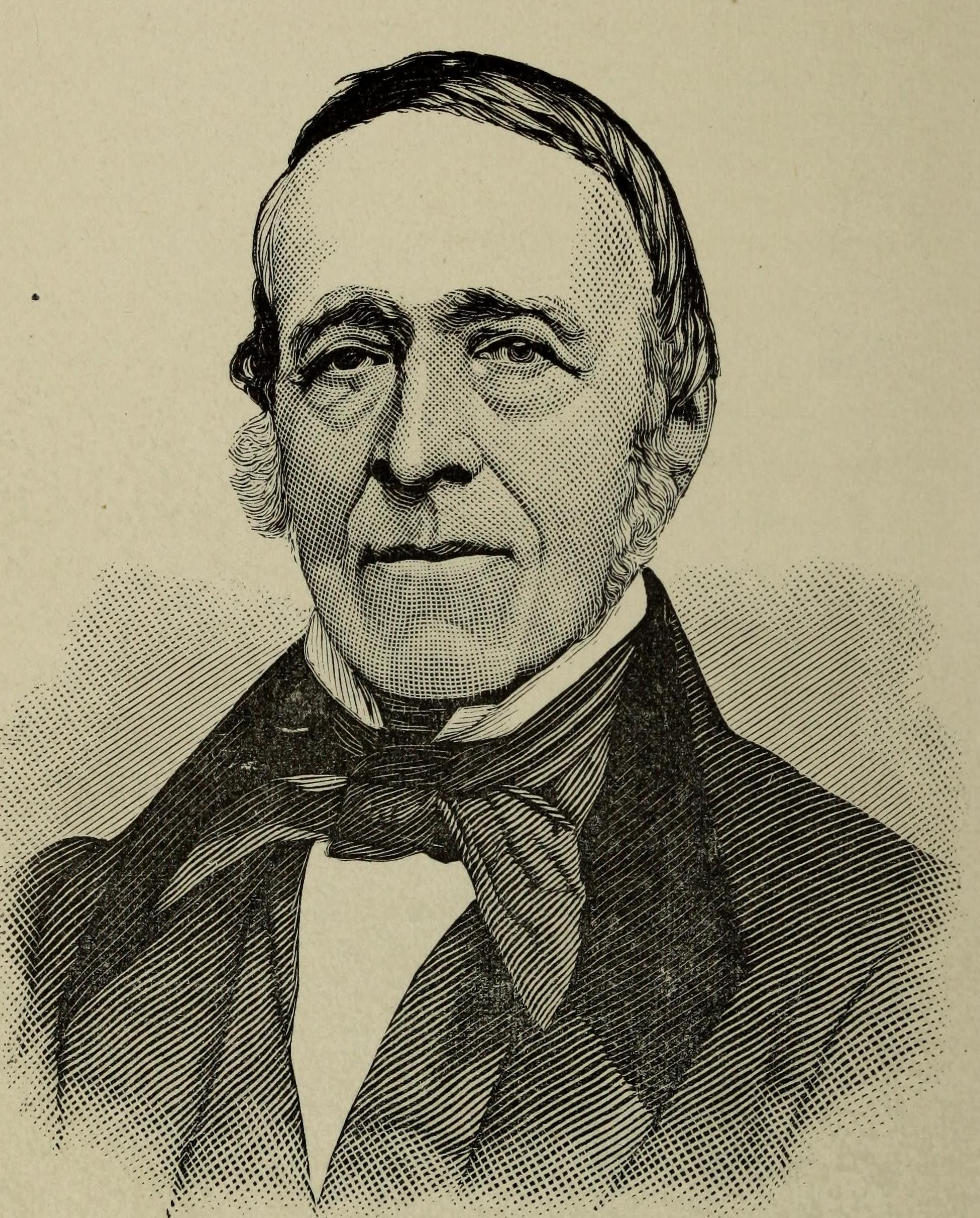
- Born: September 26, 1806
- Died: December 23, 1882 (aged 76)
- Occupation(s): Farmer, abolitionist
- Known for: 34 years as a station master on the Underground Railroad
- Spouse: Dinah Hannum Mendenhall

Isaac Mendenhall (September 26, 1806 – December 23, 1882) was an American farmer, abolitionist, and station master on the Underground Railroad in Chester County, Pennsylvania. Isaac and Dinah Mendenhall (his wife) aided several hundred fugitives to escape to freedom. Prosperous farmers, they lived at the estate of Oakdale, listed on the National Register of Historic Places since 1972. A Pennsylvania state historical marker was dedicated in their honor on November 10, 2018.

== Biography ==
Isaac's ancestor, Benjamin Mendenhall, purchased the Oakdale estate from William Penn with a deed dated June 15, 1703, and Oakdale had remained in the family ever since. Isaac's eldest son, Aaron, inherited the property from his father. The property, its centerpiece a large stone farmhouse, is located on Hillendale Road in the present-day Pennsbury Township.

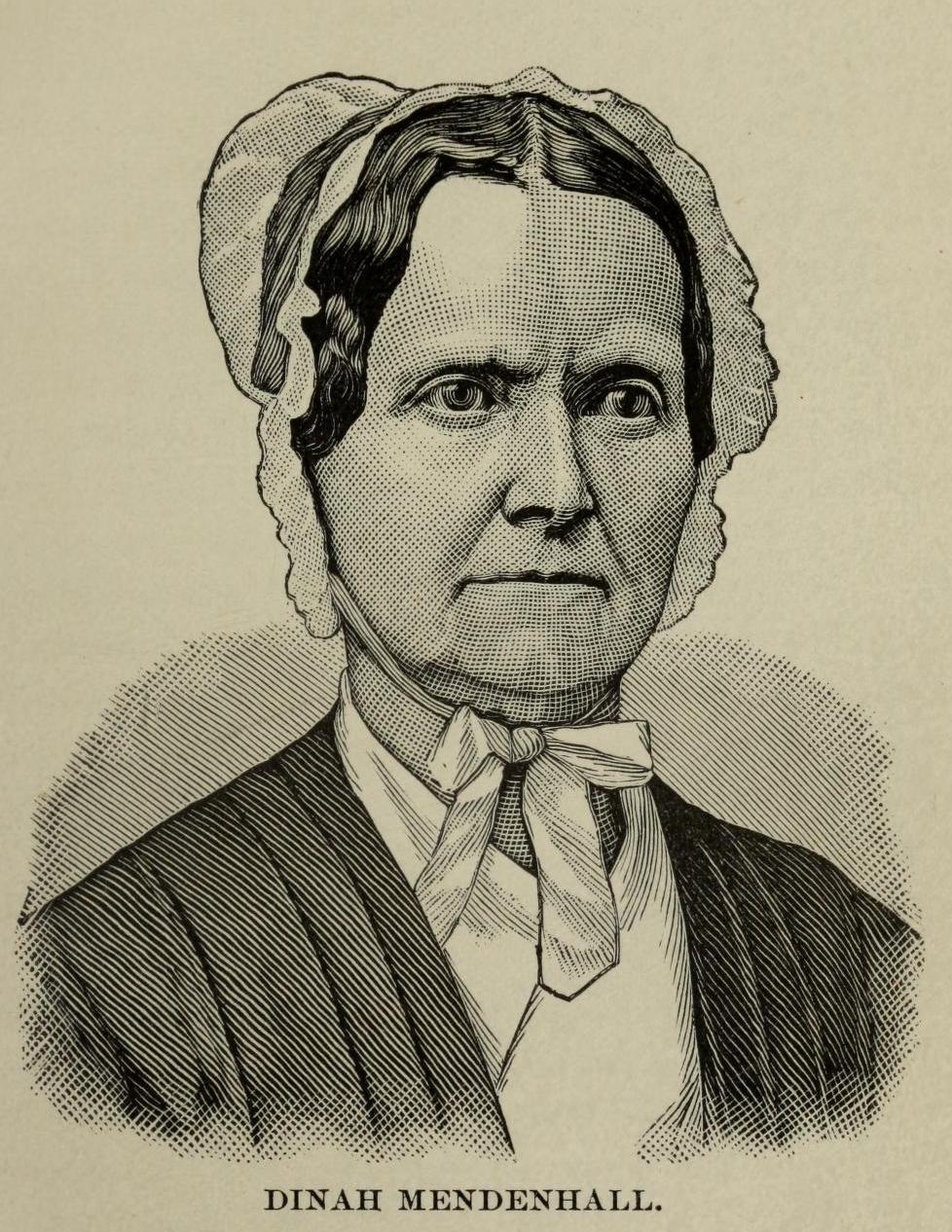
Dinah Mendenhall (1807–1889)

Dinah Hannum Mendenhall (October 15, 1807 – November 22, 1889) was the daughter of Obed Hannum and was born in Kennett Township. She served for many years as a vice president of the Universal Peace Union, a pacifist organization.

Isaac and Dinah Mendenhall were committed abolitionists and champions of the temperance, women's suffrage, pacifism, and "free expression of thought upon religion." For more than thirty-five years, they served as station masters and conductors on the Underground Railroad, part of a network that included many Quaker farmers in the Kennett Square area. Many freedom seekers came from Wilmington, Delaware, only ten miles away, where Thomas Garrett and his wife Rachel Mendenhall Garrett (Isaac's cousin) ran a safehouse. Oakdale was the first stop north of Delaware for many freedom seekers. Garrett would tell them to "go on and on until they came to a stone-gate post, and then turn in." To forestall imposters, he would write a note for freedom seekers to hand to the Mendenhalls stating that Garrett had sent a specified number of "bales of black wool."

A distinct feature of Oakdale is a concealed square chamber, built between a walk-in fireplace and the west wall of the carriage house and entered through a loft, which Isaac designed to conceal freedom seekers. For large groups, the Mendenhalls would hide the men in their barn and women and children in their springhouse. Conductors then smuggled or guided enslaved persons to the Underground Railroad's next station stops in towns such as Darby, Pocopsin, East Bradford, Newlin, Lionville, or Philadelphia. If caught violating the Fugitive Slave Act of 1850, the Mendenhalls faced arrest, imprisonment, and fines. No count was kept of those they aided, but they are believed to have participated in the escape to freedom of "several hundred" people.

In the aftermath of the Christiana Riot of 1851, in which a white slave hunter was killed, the Mendenhalls sheltered William Parker, Alexander Pinckney, Abraham Johnson, and a fourth fugitive whose name was not recorded. All four men were wanted on charges of treason. The fugitives sheltered in the Mendenhalls' barn and husked corn in the fields, passing themselves off as regular field hands and hiding in the woods when strangers feared to be bounty hunters were reported nearby. After several days, a neighbor of the Mendenhalls guided the fugitives to the home of Graceanne Lewis. From thence, the men journeyed to freedom in Canada.

Due to his outspoken abolitionism and other progressive views on women's rights and temperance, Isaac was expelled ("disowned") from the Kennett Friends Meeting in 1852 along with Eusebius Barnard, William Barnard, Isaac Meredith, and other reform-minded members of the congregation. Joining with other Quaker dissidents, Isaac became a founding member of the Longwood Meeting of Progressive Friends in May 1853. Isaac served as the second treasurer of the Longwood Meeting, in which post his son, Aaron, succeeded him. Notably, the Kennett Friends never disowned Dinah Mendenhall, there being a "division of sentiment" in her case.

Isaac served as treasurer of the Chester County Anti-Slavery Society from May 1838 through the end of the American Civil War in 1865. A prominent social activist in her own right, Dinah was a member of an abolitionist committee that met with President Abraham Lincoln in 1862 to urge him to enact the Emancipation Proclamation.

In 1851, the poet John Greenleaf Whittier wrote to the Mendenhalls: "Whenever and wherever the cause of freedom needed aid and coutenance, you were sure to be found with the noble band of Chester County men and women to whose mental culture, moral stamina, and generous self-sacrifice I can bear empathetic testimony."

Isaac and Dinah's fiftieth wedding anniversary in May 1881 was marked by a celebration attended by 225 guests.

Isaac died at home in Hamorton, Pennsylvania, on December 23, 1882. Dinah died on November 22, 1889. They were interred in Longwood Cemetery.

== See also ==
- List of Pennsylvania state historical markers in Chester County
- National Register of Historic Places listings in southern Chester County, Pennsylvania
