= John Harvey House =

John Harvey House may refer to:

- John Harvey House (Madisonville, Kentucky), listed on the NRHP in Hopkins County, Kentucky
- John Harvey House (Detroit, Michigan), listed on the NRHP in Michigan
