= Progressive Friends =

American religious group

The Progressive Friends, also known as the Congregational Friends and the Friends of Human Progress, was a loose-knit group of dissidents who left the Hicksite branch of the Society of Friends (Quakers) in the mid-nineteenth century. The separation was caused by the determination of some Quakers to participate in the social reform movements of the day despite efforts by leading Quaker bodies to dissuade them from mixing with non-Quakers. These reformers were drawn especially to organizations that opposed slavery, but also to those that campaigned for women's rights. The new organizations were structured according to congregationalist polity, a type of organization that gives a large degree of autonomy to local congregations. They were organized on a local and regional basis without the presence of a national organization. They did not see themselves as creators of a new religious sect but of a reform movement that was open to people of all religious beliefs.

== Background ==
=== Quaker structure ===
The Society of Friends, commonly known as the Quakers, were structured primarily by Yearly, Quarterly, Monthly and Preparative meetings. Those names indicated not only the frequency of their gatherings, but also the geographical span of their authority. A preparative meeting involved a single congregation, while a yearly meeting covered a wide area. Genesee Yearly Meeting, for example, included about twenty-five Quarterly and Monthly meetings in central and western New York, Michigan and Ontario, Canada.

=== Divisive issues ===
In the 1840s, two intertwined issues increasingly created divisions within the Hicksite branch of the Quakers. One issue was its hierarchical structure, which placed local bodies under the authority of higher-level bodies and gave meetings of ministers and elders the authority to discipline members. The other issue was the question of whether Quakers should be allowed to join organizations that were leading the campaign against slavery. Quakers condemned slavery but discouraged members from mixing with non-Quakers where possible, and that included broad-based anti-slavery organizations.

An additional issue was the status of women. Quaker men and women met separately, and some of the decisions of the women's meetings required approval by the men's meetings. In 1837, a proposal originating with the Junius Monthly Meeting in western New York asked Genesee Yearly meeting to eliminate this subordination and place the men's and women's meetings on equal footing. Their proposal was adopted by the Genesee Yearly Meeting but not by Yearly Meetings in other areas of the country.

== Yearly Meeting of Congregational Friends (Waterloo, NY) ==
In 1843, Michigan Quarterly Meeting, a part of Genesee Yearly Meeting, eliminated its separate meetings of ministers and elders, thereby placing all its members on equal footing. This action was opposed by important forces in Genesee Yearly Meeting. The issue festered until 1847 when a committee from Genesee Yearly Meeting told the Michigan Meeting that Genesee Yearly Meeting would no longer recognize them if they did not restore their meeting of ministers and elders. Michigan Quarterly Meeting did not do so. At the June 1848 gathering of Genesee Yearly Meeting at the Farmington Meeting House about 20 miles southeast of Rochester, New York, the clerk repeatedly refused to read the report from Michigan Quarterly Meeting. Two days of heated debate followed over the propriety of this refusal. When it became clear that Genesee Yearly Meeting was severing ties with Michigan Quarterly Meeting, about 200 members walked out in protest and began planning a new Yearly Meeting.

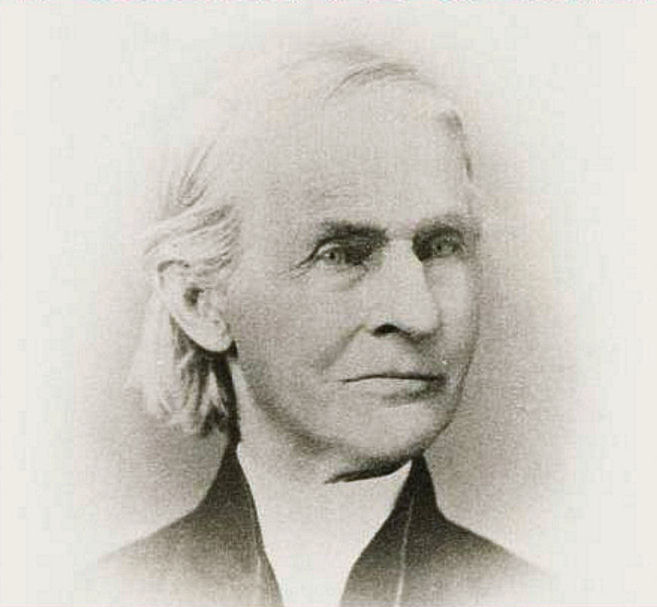
Thomas M'Clintock

Convening at Farmington on October 6, 1848, they called themselves the Congregational Friends and adopted a document called "The Basis of Religious Association," authored by Thomas M'Clintock, the organization's leading figure. It stated that there would be no hierarchy of meetings, as each local group would make its own decisions. There would be no ministers, and no member would be subordinate to another. Men and women would meet together, not separately. Members would not be bound by creed or doctrine. The organization would focus not on theology but on practical goodness. The document said, "The true basis of religious fellowship is not identity of theological belief but unity of heart and oneness of purpose in respect to the great practical duties of life."

The organization was not restricted to Quakers. According to historian Christopher Densmore, Congregational Friends, "provided a platform for reformers who were otherwise Quakers, Unitarians, Spiritualists and Free Thinkers." The call to its meeting in 1854 envisioned "… an assembly in which Christians, Jews, Mahammedans, and Pagans, men and women of all names and no name, may mingle the sympathies and feelings of a common nature, and labor together for the promotion of human welfare." The call implicitly included the native Haudenosaunee people, who followed their own traditional religious practices and who were working with local Quakers to prevent their forcible removal from that area to lands farther west.

The organization met at the Junius Meetinghouse near Waterloo, New York annually into the 1880s. It soon changed its name to the Progressive Friends, and in 1854 changed it again to Friends of Human Progress to make it clear that it was not a religious sect. Participants included such nationally known social reformers as Frederick Douglass, Susan B. Anthony, Elizabeth Cady Stanton, Charles Lenox Remond, Samuel May, Amy and Isaac Post, and Gerritt Smith.

Similar organizations were formed afterward in Michigan, Green Plain, Ohio; North Collins, New York, Chester County, Pennsylvania and several other places. "The Basis of Religious Association" was adopted by several of these organizations.

The June 1848 separation that led to the formation of the Congregational Friends played an important role in initiating the first women's rights convention, held a month later in Seneca Falls, New York, four miles east of Waterloo. Four of the five women who organized that convention were part of the new group of progressive Quakers. Thomas M'Clintock, the primary author of its "Basis of Religious Association," presided over the second evening session of the convention. At least twenty-three of the one hundred signers of the convention's Declaration of Sentiments were from the Congregational Friends, nineteen of them from the Junius meeting near Waterloo.

Elizabeth Cady Stanton, a key organizer of the Seneca Falls convention who later became a national leader of the women's rights movement, spoke on women's rights at the founding meeting of the Congregational Friends. By the 1850s, she had become an active member. She later said, "The Quaker meeting-house at Junius, N.Y., was at one time the great centre and rallying point for all those interested in reforms of the day in both church and state." Susan B. Anthony, who later became the national leader the women's suffrage movement, served as clerk of the organization in 1857.

Frederick Douglass, a leading abolitionist who was formerly enslaved, attended several meetings as well, including those in June 1861 and 1866, when Friends of Human Progress discussed how to react to the outbreak of the Civil War and its aftermath. According to the National Anti-Slavery Standard, Douglass spoke with "unrivaled eloquence" at the latter meeting in favor of a resolution for the enfranchisement of Black men and also one that said the "grand and fundamental idea" of equality and justice "will not have been practically carried out till woman, equally with man, shall have secured to her the power to cast her ballot."

The organization asserted that people had the same capabilities regardless of sex or race, declaring in 1853 that "every member of the human family, without regard to color or sex, possess potentially the same faculties and powers, capable of like cultivation and development and consequently has the same rights, interests and destiny." According to historian Nancy A. Hewitt, members of this organization “may have been unique among their contemporaries, including other activists and other Quakers, in extending this belief in human equality across the color line.”

== Pennsylvania Yearly Meeting of Progressive Friends (Longwood, PA) ==
Tension developed within the Pennsylvania Yearly Meeting as early as 1845 when members of the Marlborough Meeting House opposed efforts by their supervisory bodies to prevent members from joining with non-Quakers in anti-slavery organizations. In 1848, after news had spread about the separation in western New York and the formation there and elsewhere of the Congregational Friends, a dispute erupted in the Green Street Meeting over the practice of holding separate meetings for men and women and also of giving special weight to the opinions of ministers and elders. After a formal separation in the Pennsylvania Yearly Meeting in 1852, the Pennsylvania Yearly Meeting of Progressive Friends was organized on May 22, 1853, at the Kennett Meeting House. Later known as the Friends of Human Progress, the organization met annually at the Longwood Meeting House near Kennett Square, Pennsylvania, a western suburb of Philadelphia.

The new organization announced its principles in an "Exposition of Sentiments" that said, among other things, "We interrogate no man as to his theological belief; we send no Committees to pry into the motives of those who may desire to share the benefits of our Association; but open the door to all who recognize the Equal Brotherhood of the Human Family, without regard to sex, color or condition". Participants included such nationally known figures as Lucretia Mott, William Lloyd Garrison, Joseph A. Dugdale, Ruth Townsend Dugdale and Harriet Jacobs. Its annual meetings in the early years lasted for three or four days and involved hundreds of people attending lectures and picnics. Contrary to traditional Quaker practice, these meetings included concerts and congregational singing. The organization also held missionary meetings throughout the region, with speakers, professional singers, and the distribution of reform tracts.

Eusebius Barnard, Isaac Mendenhall, and other members of the congregation were active in the Underground Railroad and assisted hundreds of fugitive slaves to escape to freedom in Canada or the northern states. The most effective of these station masters, Thomas Garrett, helped more than 2,500 African Americans escape from slavery. In June 1862, a delegation from the organization met with President Abraham Lincoln and asked him to declare an immediate end to slavery.

The organization slowly declined. By its fiftieth anniversary in 1903, its annual meetings had been reduced in length to two days, and its Proceedings, published annually, contained far fewer pages than before. The group disbanded in 1940. Its building, the Longwood Meeting House, still stands at the edge of the Longwood Gardens. This organization was the largest of the Progressive Friends groups, and it lasted the longest.

== Spiritualist connections ==
The Collins Annual Meeting of the Friends of Human Progress in North Collins, New York, southwest of Buffalo, met annually from 1848 until after 1945. It soon developed a strong orientation toward spiritualism, the belief that communication is possible with the spirits of the dead. According historian Ann Braude, "In 1883, they incorporated in order to rebuild their meeting place, Hemlock Hall, which was ultimately replaced by Lily Dale, a spiritualist summer meeting ground that still flourishes today." Similar spiritualist groups appeared in the Midwest with names like the Yearly Meeting of Progressive Friends and Spiritualists, the Quarterly Meeting of the Progressive Spiritualists, and the Friends of Progressive Spiritualists, Little is known about these organizations, and it isn't clear how much their activities reflected the original reform goals of the Progressive Friends movement.

== List of organizations ==
Congregational Friends meetings were established in at least these locations:

- Yearly Meeting of Congregational Friends, Waterloo, New York
- North Collins (New York) Yearly Meeting
- Green Plain Annual Meeting of Friends who have adopted the Congregational Order, Ohio
- Michigan Yearly Meeting of Friends of Human Progress
- Ohio Yearly Meeting of Progressive Friends held at Salem, Ohio
- Meeting of Progressive Friends in Eden, Iowa
- Meeting of Progressive Friends held in Wayne, Ohio
- Wabash Yearly Meeting of Congregational Friends (Indiana)
- Pennsylvania Yearly Meeting of Progressive Friends
- Indiana Yearly Meeting of Progressive Friends

The historian who compiled this list in 1920 said that some of the listed local groups might not have been independent but instead were associated with one of the listed yearly meetings.

== Legacy ==
After the end of the American Civil War in 1865, Quaker congregations entered a period of steep decline as the younger generation abandoned Quaker dress, speech and discipline. This rejection of traditional practices undercut the authority of Quaker elders and ministers, resulting in restructurings along the lines envisioned earlier by the Progressive Friends. According to historian Judith Wellman, "In effect, the Civil War led Hicksite Friends to espouse the core tenets of the Congregational/Progressive Friends who had left their meetings only two decades earlier."

The Progressive Friends movement also declined after the Civil War, but for a different reason. Opposition to slavery had been the most important purpose of most of these groups. As a result, most of them ceased to function after slavery had been abolished as an outcome of the war. The few remaining groups declined in vigor as new organizations emerged as centers for reform activity, such as Anthony and Stanton's National Woman Suffrage Association. By 1920, the existence of the Congregational/Progressive Friends movement had largely been forgotten, even by most Quaker historians. Ironically, by then the type of organization envisioned in the 1848 "Basis of Religious Association" had become routinely accepted by most Quakers. This was especially true for the Friends General Conference, one of the two main branches of Quakerism after 1900. Its first General Secretary, Henry Wilbur, was a long-time supporter of the Longwood Progressive Friends.

== Bibliography ==
- Densmore, Christopher (1995) and Hugh Barbour, Sabron Reynolds Newton, Alson D. Van Wagner. "After the Separation", in Quaker Crosscurrents: Three Hundred Years of Friends in the New York Yearly Meetings, edited by Hugh Barbour, Christopher Densmore, Elizabeth H. Moger, Nancy C. Sorel, Alson D. Van Wagner, and Arthur J. Worrall; Syracuse University Press. ISBN 978-0815626510
- Densmore, Christopher (1995). "Forty-Seven Years Before the Woman's Bible: Elizabeth Cady Stanton and the Congregational Friends," a talk delivered at the Woman's Bible Centennial Conference at Seneca Falls, NY, November 4, 1995.
- Densmore, Christopher (2004). "Be Ye Therefore Perfect: Anti-Slavery and the Origins of the Yearly Meeting of Progressive Friends in Chester County, Pennsylvania",Quaker History, vol 9, No 2, Fall 2004..
- Densmore, Christopher (2006). "From the Hicksites to the Progressive Friends: The Rural Roots of Perfectionism and Social Reform among North American Friends". Quaker Studies, Vol. 10, Issue 3, Article 7.
- Fager, Chuck (2014). Angels of Progress: A Documentary History of the Progressive Friends 1822-1940, CreateSpace Independent Publishing Platform. ISBN 978-1496170033
- Hewitt, Nancy (1995) and Margaret Hope Bacon, Christopher Densmore, Thomas D. Hamm, Sabron Reynolds Newton, Katherine Sorel, Alson D. Van Wagner. "Women's Rights and roles ", in Quaker Crosscurrents: Three Hundred Years of Friends in the New York Yearly Meetings, edited by Hugh Barbour, Christopher Densmore, Elizabeth H. Moger, Nancy C. Sorel, Alson D. Van Wagner, and Arthur J. Worrall; Syracuse University Press. ISBN 978-0815626510
- Hewitt, Nancy A. (2001). Women's Activism and Social Change: Rochester, New York, 1822–1872. Lexington Books, Lanham, Maryland. ISBN 0-7391-0297-4.
- Hewitt, Nancy A. (2018). Radical Friend: Amy Kirby Post and Her Activist World. University of North Carolina Press. ISBN 978-1469640327.
- Thomas, Allen C. (1920). "Congregational or Progressive Friends, A Forgotten Episode in Quaker History", Bulletin of Friends' Historical Society, Vol 10, No. 1, November 1920.
- Wahl, Albert J. (1958). The Pennsylvania Yearly Meeting of Progressive Friends, Pennsylvania History, vol 25, no. 2, April 1958.
- Wellman, Judith, (2004) The Road to Seneca Falls: Elizabeth Cady Stanton and the First Women's Rights Convention, University of Illinois Press. ISBN 0-252-02904-6
- Wellman, Judith, (2017). 1816 Farmington Quaker Meetinghouse, Farmington, New York, Historic Structure Report", The 1816 Farmington Quaker Meetinghouse Museum.
