= Joseph A. Dugdale =

American abolitionist and women's suffragist

Joseph A Dugdale
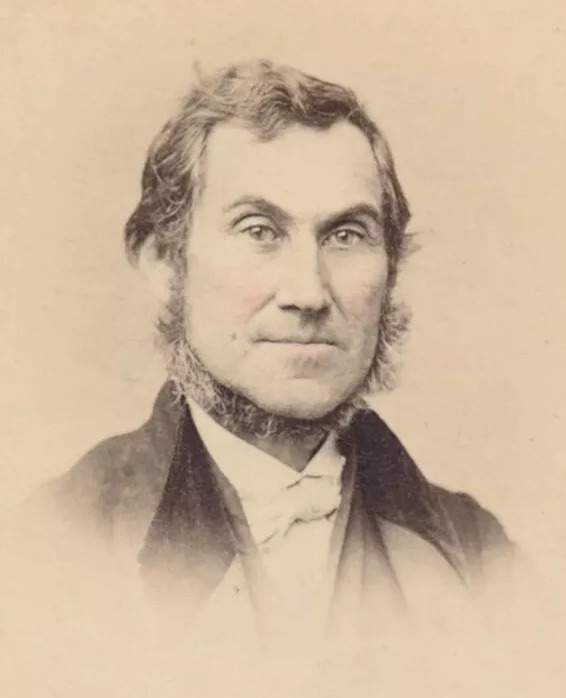
- Born: November 14, 1810 Bristol, Pennsylvania
- Died: March 4, 1896 (aged 85) Mount Pleasant, Iowa

Joseph Annesley Dugdale (November 14, 1810 – March 4, 1896) was an abolitionist and Women's Suffragist.

Dugdale was a Quaker, Abolitionist and Women's Suffragist in Ohio, Pennsylvania and Iowa. In 1827, the family moved to Salem, Ohio, there Joseph A. Dugdale was disowned for his support of Elias Hicks and his antislavery sentiments. , In 1833, Dugdale moved to Clark County, Ohio. In 1835, Dugdale attended the first meeting of the Ohio Anti-Slavery Society. He also served as President of the New Garden Anti Slavery Society. In 1851 Dugdale moved his family to Chester County, Pennsylvania. In 1852, Dugdale helped organize the first Women's Rights Convention in West Chester, Pennsylvania. In 1853, Dugdale and other reformers established the Pennsylvania Yearly Meeting of Progressive Friends. Lucretia Mott and Sojourner Truth both attended. On September 6th and 7th, 1853, Dugdale was one of the speakers at the Women's rights Convention in New York City known as the "Mob Convention." In 1854, Dugdale had established Children's Conventions, which dubbed him the title, "Uncle Joseph, the Children's Friend." In 1855 the Progressive Friends had built Longwood Meetinghouse. In 1861, Dugdale and family moved to Marion County, Iowa. In 1862, Dugdale started holding his Children's Conventions there. In 1870 the Dugales were leaders in the Women's Suffrage Convention held in Henry County, Iowa. Joseph being appointed temporary Chairman and Corresponding Secretary. In 1875 Dugdale was elected President of an Underground Railroad Convention in Salem, Iowa.

== Early life and family ==
Joseph A. Dugdale was born at Bristol, Pennsylvania, November 14, 1810, to John and Sarah Barton (Ridgeway) Dugdale. A year after Joseph's birth, the family moved to Trenton, New Jersey. He married Ruth Townsend Dugdale in 1833 and together they had three children, Pillon Dugdale (who died young), John Dilwyn Dugdale (1835-1920), Edith Dugdale (who died young).
