= Brinton-King Farmstead =

Historic house in Pennsylvania, United States

- U.S. National Register of Historic Places
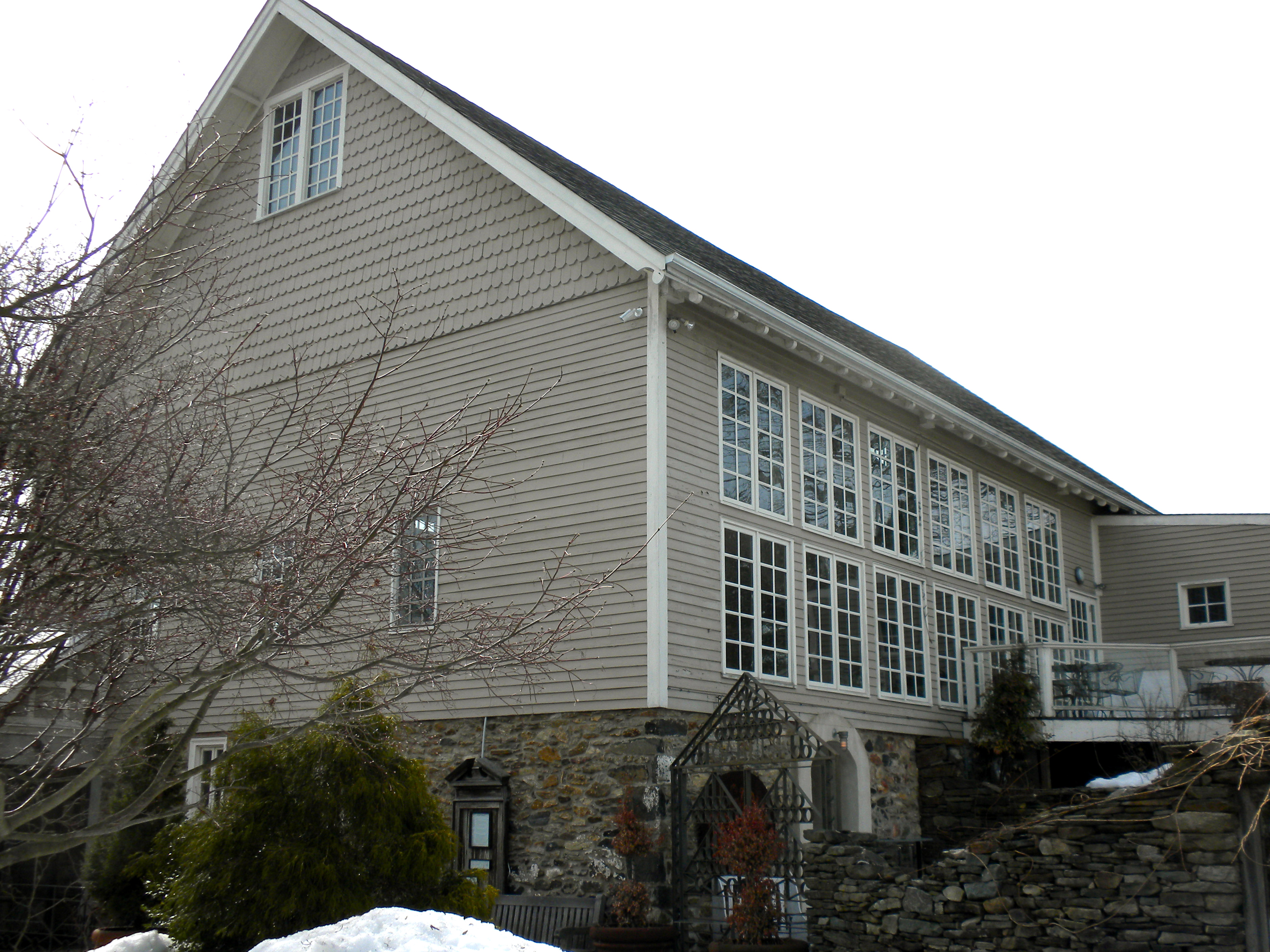
- Brinton-King Farmstead, March 2010

- Location within Pennsylvania Location within the United States
- Location: 1301 Brinton's Bridge Rd., 162 Baltimore Pike, Pennsbury Township, Pennsylvania
- Coordinates: 39°52′29″N 75°37′13″W
- Area: 2.8 acres (1.1 ha)
- Built: c. 1780, c. 1795, c. 1838, c. 1889, c. 1910
- Architectural style: Queen Anne, Pennsylvania Farmhouse
- NRHP reference No.: 02000230
- Added to NRHP: March 21, 2002

Brinton-King Farmstead, also known as the Joseph Brinton Farmstead, is a historic home located in Pennsbury Township, Chester County, Pennsylvania. It is a 2 1/2-story, stuccoed stone Pennsylvania farmhouse built in five stages. The earliest stages dates to about 1780 and 1795. Later modifications occurred by 1838, in about 1889 with its remodeling to the Queen Anne style, then about 1910. It features a wraparound porch with turned supports, spindlework, and round brackets. The house was adapted for use as a restaurant in 1948. Also on the property is a contributing 2 1/2-story, stone and frame bank barn with a gable roof.

It was added to the National Register of Historic Places in 2002.
