= Pennsbury Inn =

- Wild Wisteria
- U.S. National Register of Historic Places
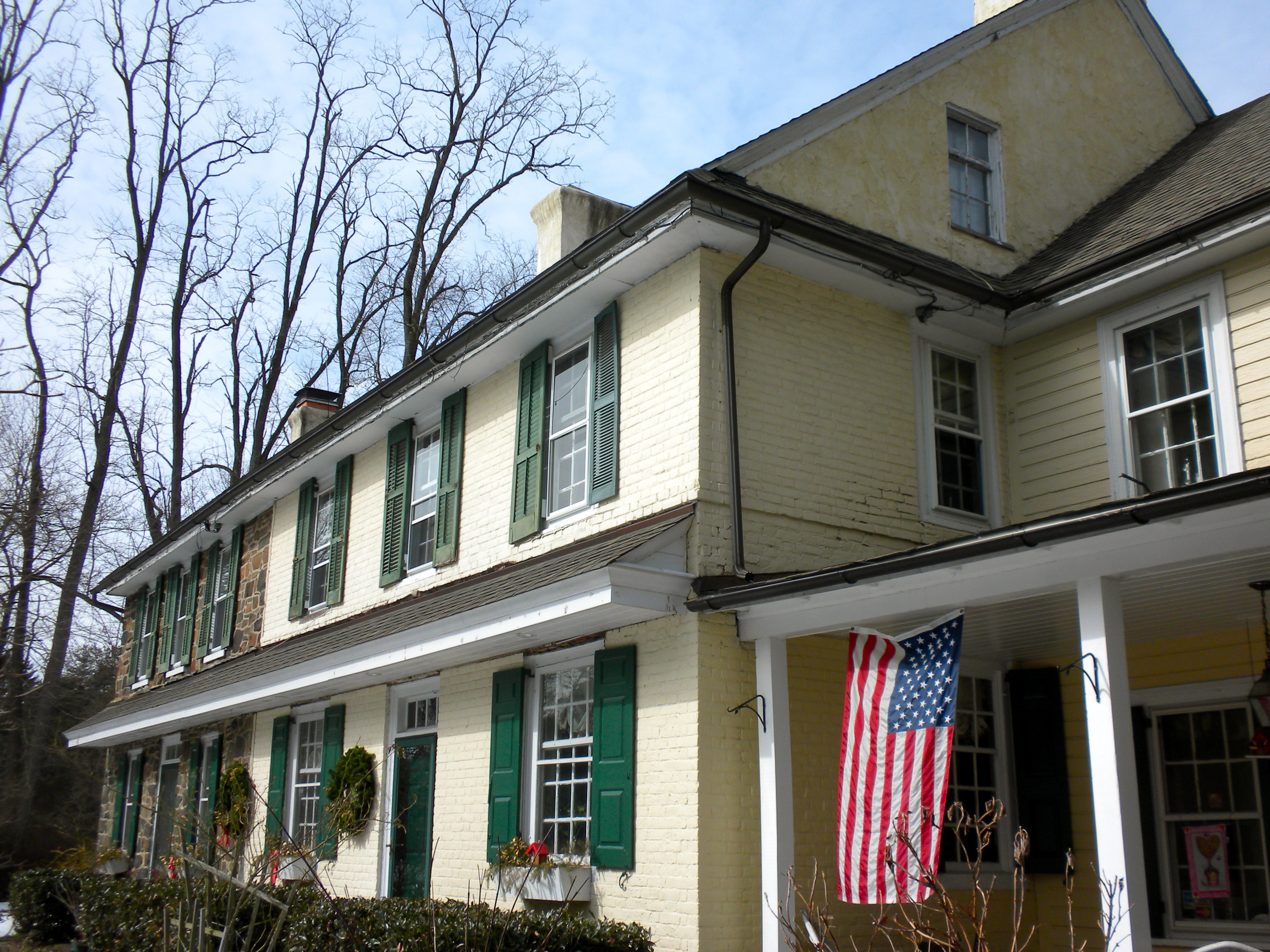
- Pennsbury Inn, March 2010

- Location within Pennsylvania Location within the United States
- Location: On U.S. Route 1 at its junction with Hickory Hill Road, near Chadds Ford, Pennsbury Township, Pennsylvania
- Coordinates: 39°52′29″N 75°38′13″W
- Area: 8 acres (3.2 ha)
- Built: 1714
- NRHP reference No.: 72001104
- Added to NRHP: March 16, 1972

The Pennsbury Inn, now known as Wild Wisteria, and formerly known as the Lancaster Inn or Hal-Dell Farm, is an historic inn and tavern in Pennsbury Township, Chester County, Pennsylvania, United States.

It was added to the National Register of Historic Places in 1973 and converted to a Bed and Breakfast in 1999.

== History and architectural features ==
A stone and brick structure that dates to the early eighteenth century, this building initially served as an inn and then a tavern until the late nineteenth century, after which it was remodeled into a two-family dwelling.
