= Ruth Townsend Dugdale =

American abolitionist and women's suffragist

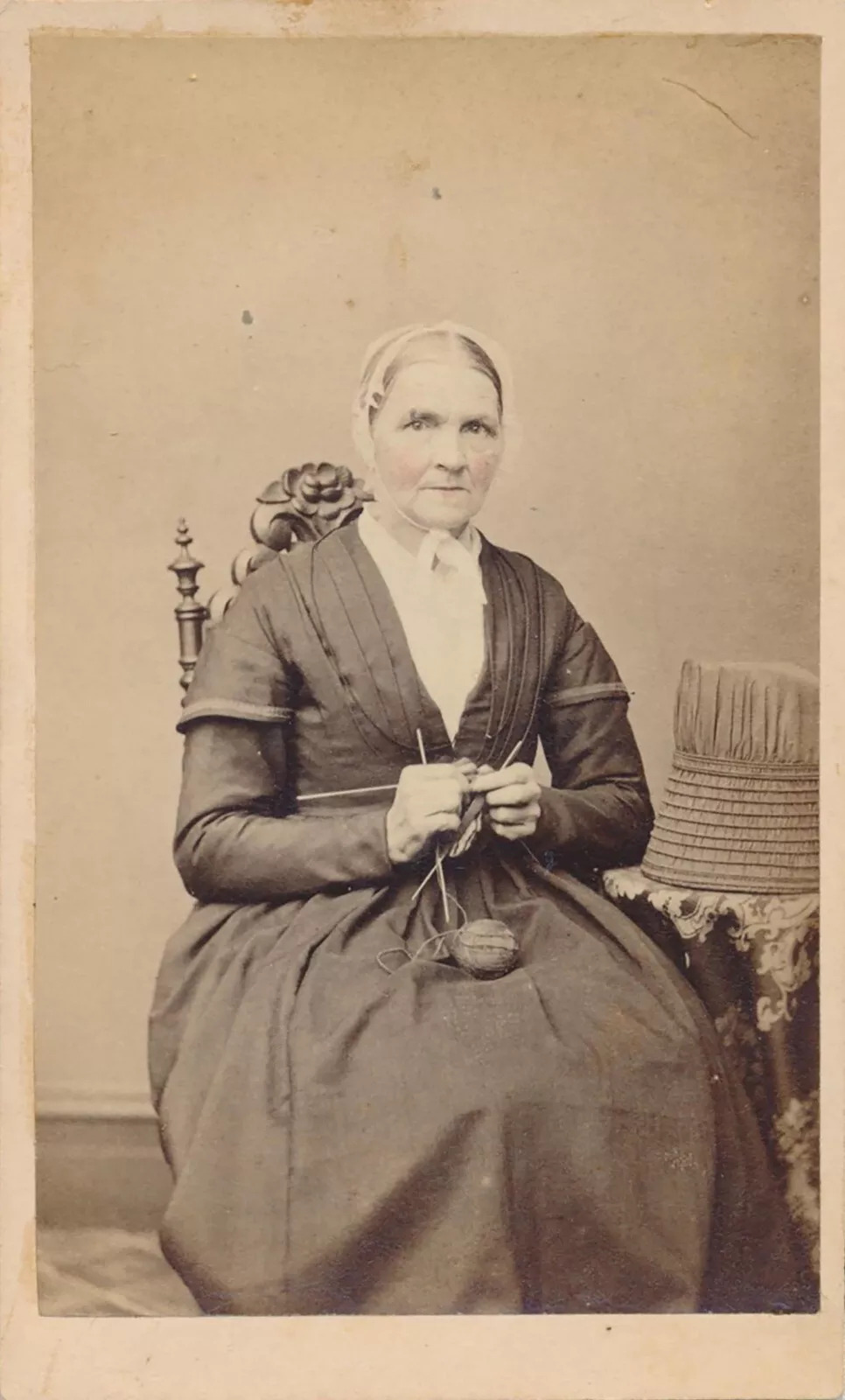
- Born: April 21, 1802; Brownsville, Pennsylvania, U.S.
- Died: September 5, 1898 (aged 96); Mount Pleasant, Iowa, U.S.
- Spouse: Joseph A. Dugdale

Ruth Townsend Dugdale (April 21, 1802 – September 5, 1898) was an American abolitionist and women's suffragist. She lived in Ohio, Pennsylvania and Iowa.

In 1827, the family moved to Salem, Ohio, there Joseph A. Dugdale was disowned for his support of Elias Hicks and his antislavery sentiments. In 1833, the Dugdales moved to Clark County, Ohio. In 1835, Dugdale attended the first meeting of the Ohio Anti-Slavery Society. In 1851 the Dugdales moved to Chester County, Pennsylvania. In 1852, the Dugdales helped organize the first Women's Rights Convention in West Chester, Pennsylvania. On September 6 and 7, 1853, the Dugdales attended the Women's rights Convention in New York City known as the "Mob Convention." In 1853, the Dugdales and other reformers established the Pennsylvania Yearly Meeting of Progressive Friends. Lucretia Mott and Sojourner Truth both attended. On October 18, 1854, a Women's Rights Convention was held in Sansom Street Hall in Philadelphia. Joseph A. Dugdale was appointed one of the Secretaries, while Ruth Townsend Dugdale, Susan B. Anthony, James Mott and Rebecca Plumbley were appointed as the Finance Committee. Other members of the administrative body included Lucretia Mott, William Lloyd Garrison and Lucy Stone. In 1855 the Progressive Friends had built Longwood Meeting House. In 1861, the Dugdales and family moved to Marion County, Iowa. In 1870 the Dugales were leaders in the Women's Suffrage Convention held in Henry County, Iowa. Joseph being appointed temporary Chairman and Corresponding Secretary, and Ruth served as a vice President. In 1875 both Joseph and Ruth were instrumental in organizing an Underground Railroad Convention in Salem, Iowa.

== Early life and family ==
Ruth Cadwallader Townsend was born at Brownsville, Pennsylvania, April 21, 1802, to Jesse and Edith (Cadawallader) Townsend. She married Joseph A. Dugdale and together they had three children, Pillon Dugdale (who died young), John D. Dugdale (1835-1920), Edith Dugdale (who died young).
