= Springdale Farm (Mendenhall, Pennsylvania) =

Historic house in Pennsylvania, United States

- U.S. National Register of Historic Places
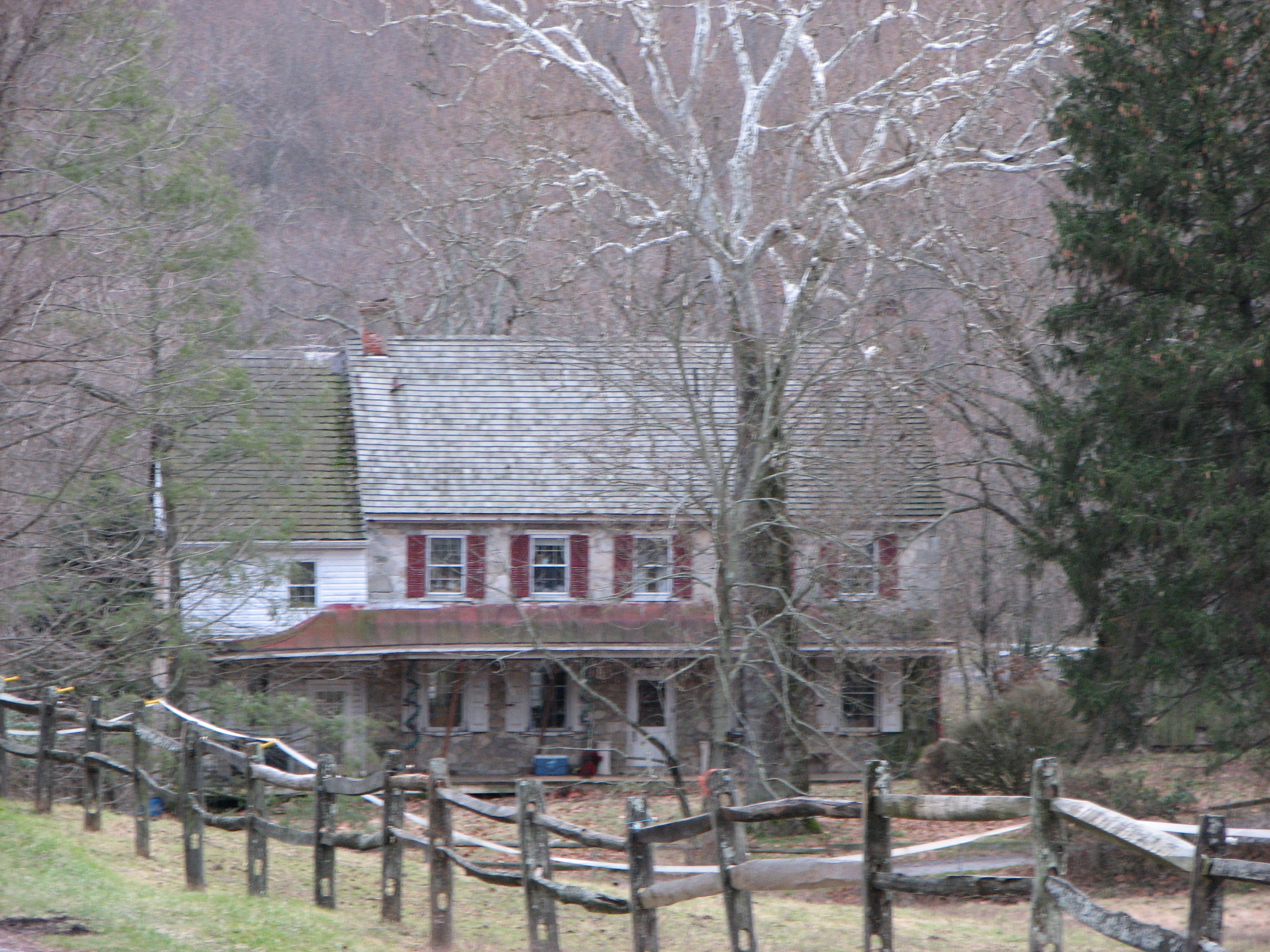
- Springdale Farm, December 2008

- Location within Pennsylvania Location within the United States
- Location: Northeast of Mendenhall on Hillendale Road, Pennsbury Township, Pennsylvania
- Coordinates: 39°51′39″N 75°37′45″W
- Area: 111.3 acres (45.0 ha)
- Built: c. 1748, 1836
- Architectural style: Federal
- NRHP reference No.: 73001607
- Added to NRHP: March 7, 1973

Springdale Farm, also known as the Elwood Mendenhall Farm, is an historic home that is located in Pennsbury Township, Chester County, Pennsylvania, United States.

It was added to the National Register of Historic Places in 1973.

== History and architectural features ==
The original house was built before 1748, and now forms a wing of the main house. The main house was built in 1836 and is a 2 1/2-story, five-bay, stone Federal-style dwelling that has a steep gable roof and a long porch added in the 1870s. The property was continuously owned by the Mendenhall family from 1703 until 2012 when family ownership was lost to bank foreclosure on the property.
