= William Peters House =

Historic house in Pennsylvania, United States

- U.S. National Register of Historic Places
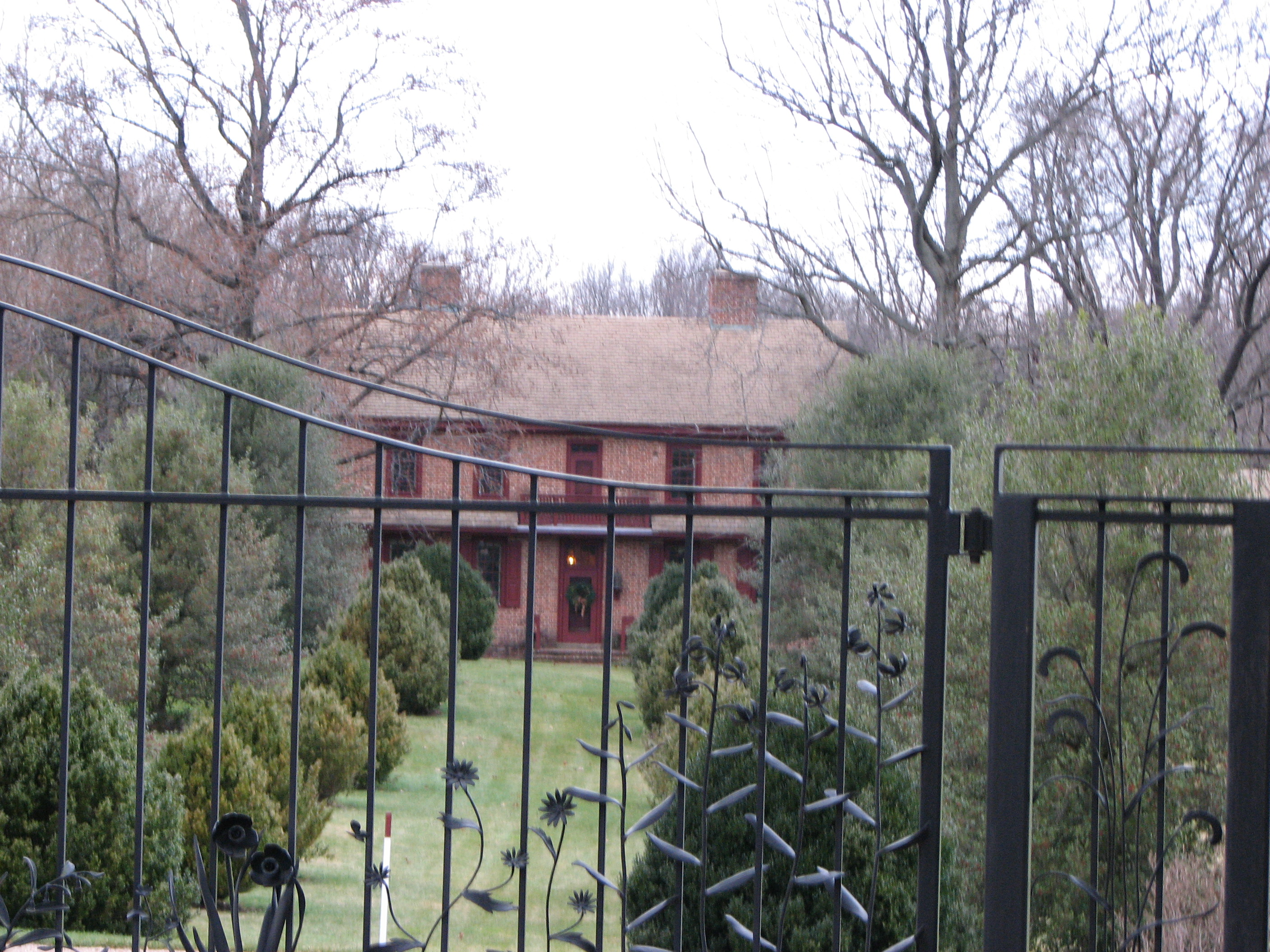
- William Peters House, December 2008

- Location within Pennsylvania Location within the United States
- Location: Hillendale Rd., Pennsbury Township, Pennsylvania
- Coordinates: 39°51′50″N 75°37′36″W
- Area: 2.2 acres (0.89 ha)
- Built: 1749-1750
- Architectural style: Georgian
- NRHP reference No.: 71000696
- Added to NRHP: May 27, 1971

The William Peters House is an historic home that is located in Pennsbury Township, Chester County, Pennsylvania, United States.

Moved to its present site in 1965, it was added to the National Register of Historic Places in 1971.

== History and architectural features ==
The original house was built in Aston Township, Pennsylvania between 1749 and 1750. A brick Georgian-style dwelling, it was modified during the nineteenth century with the addition of a front porch, at which time the second story's front elevation was closed off, and a balcony door was replaced with a window. In addition, a rear porch was added while front and rear exterior doors and windows, a bake oven and a summer kitchen were all removed. The structure was then moved to its present site in 1965. A wing with kitchen was then added to the back of the structure, and a bookcase was built into the home's library. A new drainage system was also added to the exterior to protect the home's foundation, and the doorway between the closets inside of the library and parlor were removed to create a single, large closet.
