= Oakdale (Pennsbury Township, Pennsylvania) =

Historic house in Pennsylvania, United States

- U.S. National Register of Historic Places
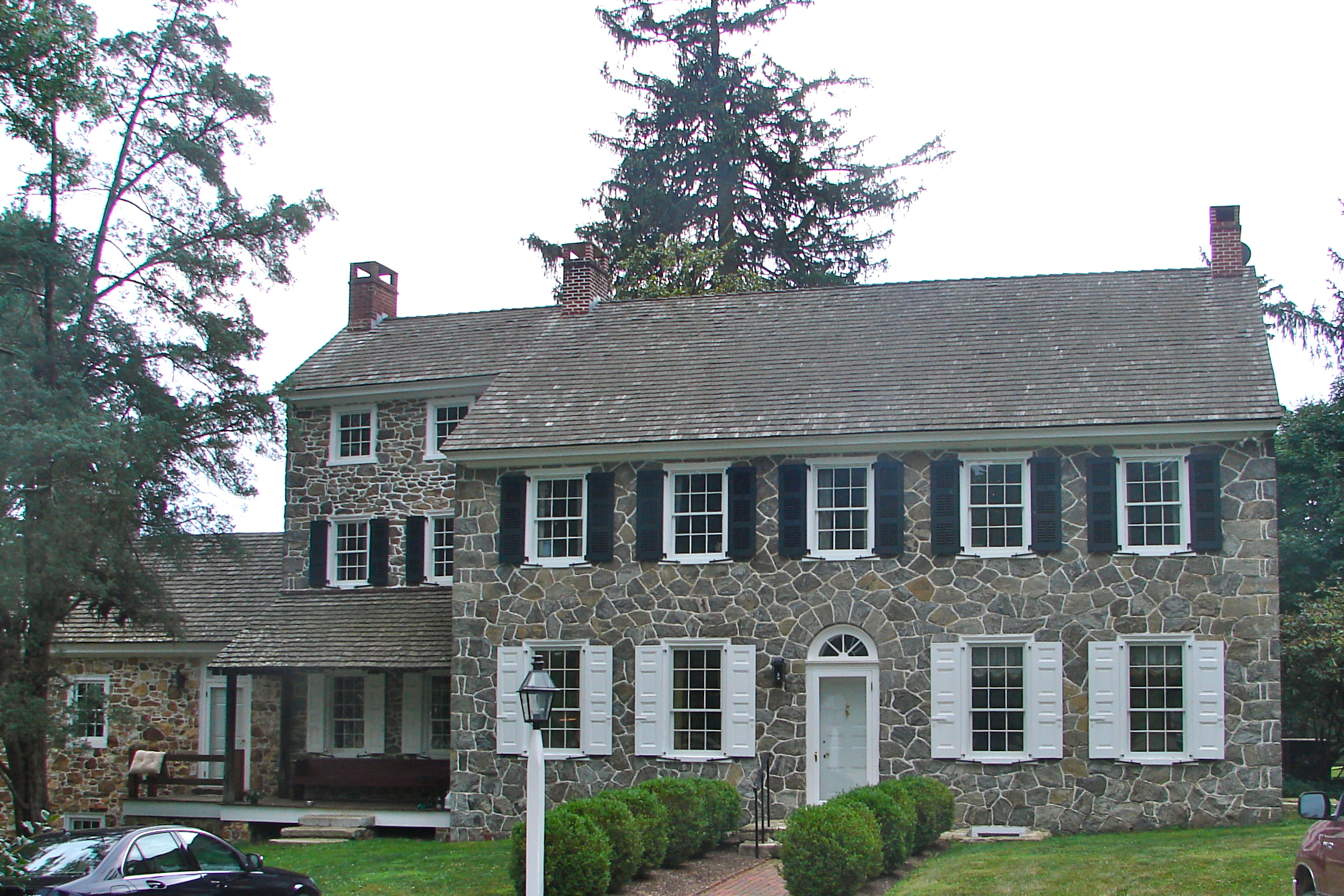
- Oakdale, July 2011

- Location within Pennsylvania Location within the United States
- Location: Hillendale Rd., Pennsbury Township, Pennsylvania
- Coordinates: 39°51′39″N 75°37′18″W
- Area: 1 acre (0.40 ha)
- Built: 1840
- NRHP reference No.: 72001103
- Added to NRHP: January 13, 1972

Oakdale, also known as the Isaac Mendenhall Estate, is a historic home located in Pennsbury Township, Chester County, Pennsylvania. It was built in 1840, and is representative of the home of a prosperous Quaker farmer of the mid-19th century. The associated carriage house has a room known to have harbored freedom seekers on the Underground Railroad.

It was added to the National Register of Historic Places in 1972.
