= Harvey-Niemeyer House =

- U.S. National Register of Historic Places
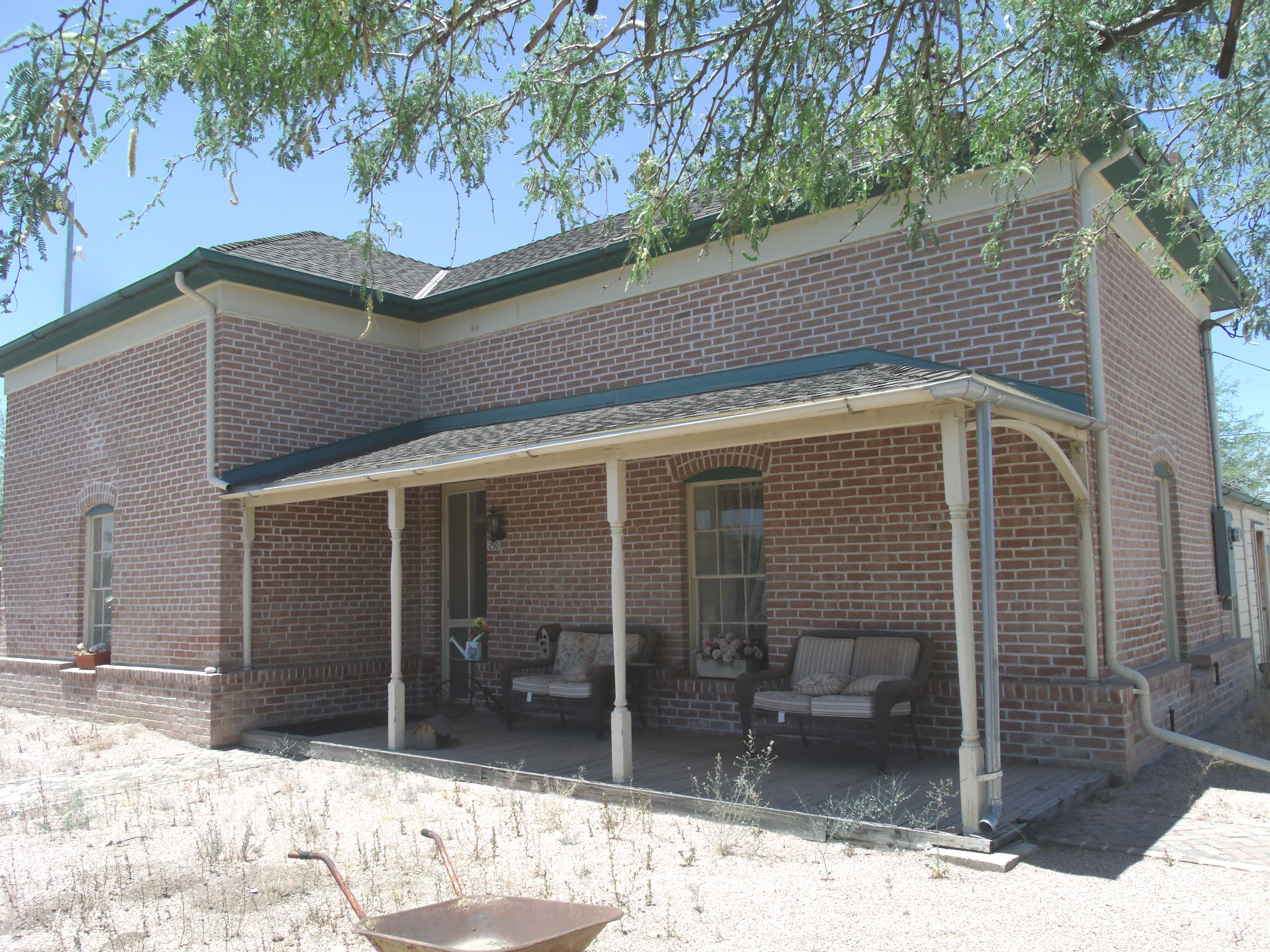

- Location within Arizona Location within the United States
- Location: 250 S. Main St., Florence, Arizona
- Coordinates: 33.029167°N 111.386944°W
- Area: less than one acre
- Built: 1875
- Architectural style: Queen Anne, Sonoran
- MPS: Florence MRA
- NRHP reference No.: 86002627
- Added to NRHP: August 1, 1986

The Harvey-Niemeyer House, in Florence, Arizona, is a one-story house built around 1874. It was listed on the National Register of Historic Places in 1986, as a result of a study of historic resources in the Florence area.

It was built first as a T-shaped adobe house, which was probably flat-roofed, with an attached front porch and a rear frame addition, around 1874. It was renovated in 1892 with addition of a hipped roof and a veneer of fired brick on all but the rear facade. It was expanded also with a row of rooms across its rear in 1936.

It was deemed significant as "an outstanding example of a local architectural type known as 'Early Transitional.' Early Transitional buildings manifest characteristics of both Sonoran and American Victorian styles. The building is also associated with two locally significant individuals: Dr. William Harvey, M.D., and Charles H. Niemeyer." It was judged to be comparable to the best examples of Early Transitional style in the National Register-listed Florence Townsite Historic District.

It is located outside that district at 250 S. Main St., but when it was listed its address was 1618 Main St. (Note: There is building code requiring numbering South and North to commence at a certain street, suggesting that the city implemented a renumbering of locations on this and other streets. The codes also requires posting of street numbers. See here.)

It is a one-story house built of adobe around 1874. It was remodeled in 1892 and expanded in 1936. It is about 42 by 45 feet (13 m × 14 m) in plan.

It was home of physician William Harvey, who became known as an "Angel of Mercy" during a smallpox epidemic. Harvey also came to address the aftermath of the 1888 Gabriel-Phy shootout. Charles Niemeyer, a later homeowner, served as a postmaster and, for 25 years, as Clerk of the Pinal County Board of Supervisors.
