= Harvey Mansion =

Historic house in North Carolina, United States

- U.S. National Register of Historic Places
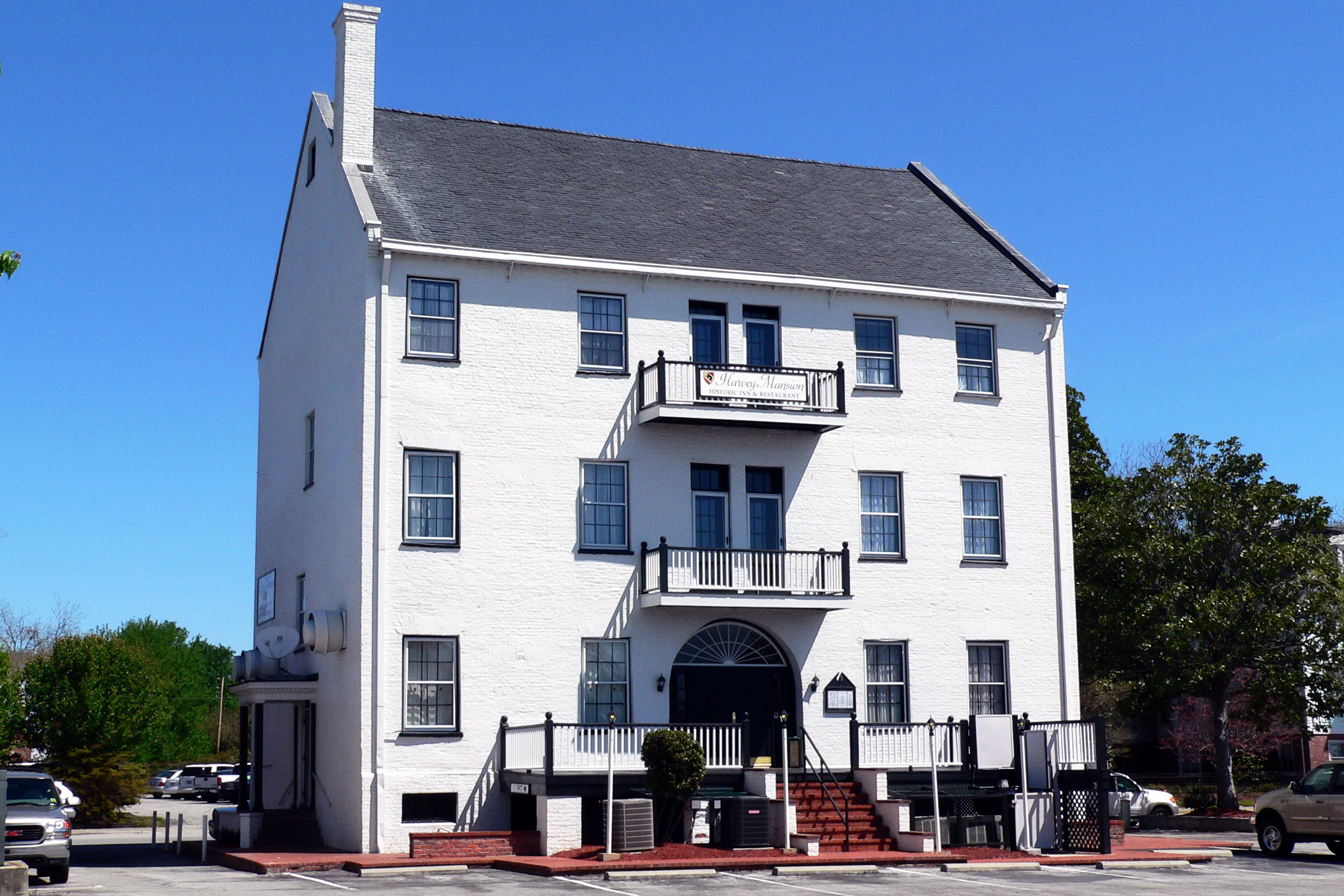
- Harvey Mansion, 2006

- Location within North Carolina Location within the United States
- Location: 219 Tryon Palace Dr., New Bern, North Carolina
- Coordinates: 35°6′16″N 77°2′17″W
- Area: 0.5 acres (0.20 ha)
- Built: c. 1810
- NRHP reference No.: 71000574
- Added to NRHP: November 12, 1971

Harvey Mansion is a historic home located at New Bern, Craven County, North Carolina. It was built about 1793, and is a three-story, brick dwelling with an exposed basement. The house was built by John Harvey who used it as a residential home and also for commercial space. The Harvey was a multi-purpose building for hundreds of years since it was first erected. Throughout its lifetime The Harvey has been an apartment house, a family owned restaurant, boarding school, military academy, and temporary barracks for elements of the Union Army and was the original home of what is now Craven Community College.

It is listed on the National Register of Historic Places since 1971.
