= Parkersville Friends Meetinghouse =

Historic church in Pennsylvania, United States

- U.S. National Register of Historic Places
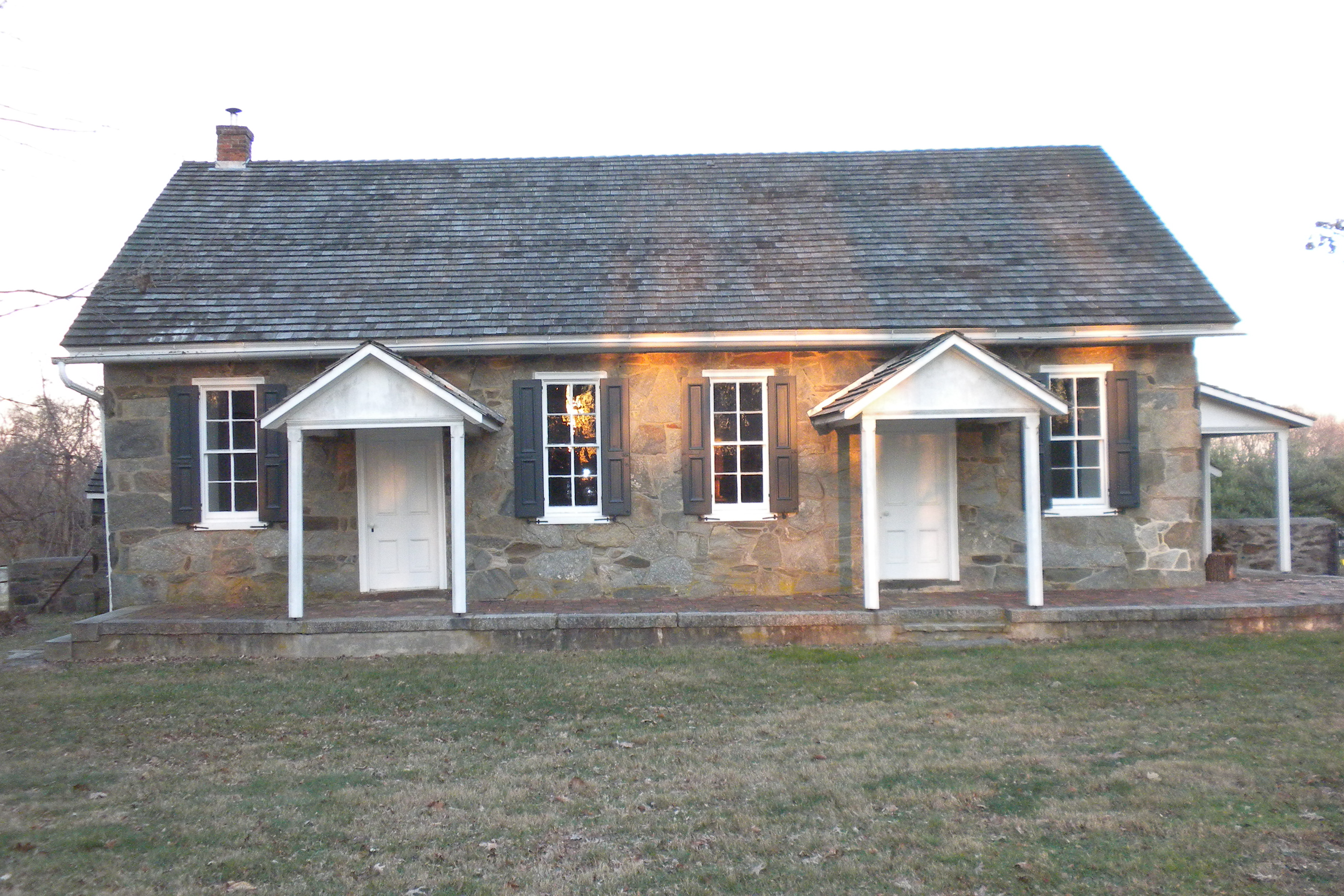
- Parkersville Friends Meetinghouse, December 2009

- Location within Pennsylvania Location within the United States
- Location: South of Parkersville off Pennsylvania Route 926, Pennsbury Township, Pennsylvania
- Coordinates: 39°53′10″N 75°38′44″W
- Area: 9.9 acres (4.0 ha)
- Built: 1830
- NRHP reference No.: 73001610
- Added to NRHP: March 20, 1973

Parkersville Friends Meetinghouse, also known as Kennett Preparative Meeting of Friends, is a historic Quaker meeting house located in Pennsbury Township, Chester County, Pennsylvania. It was built in 1830, and rebuilt in 1917 after a fire.It is a one-story, stone building with a gable roof.

It was added to the National Register of Historic Places in 1973.
