= Harvey House (Radford, Virginia) =

Historic house in Virginia, United States

- U.S. National Register of Historic Places
- Virginia Landmarks Register
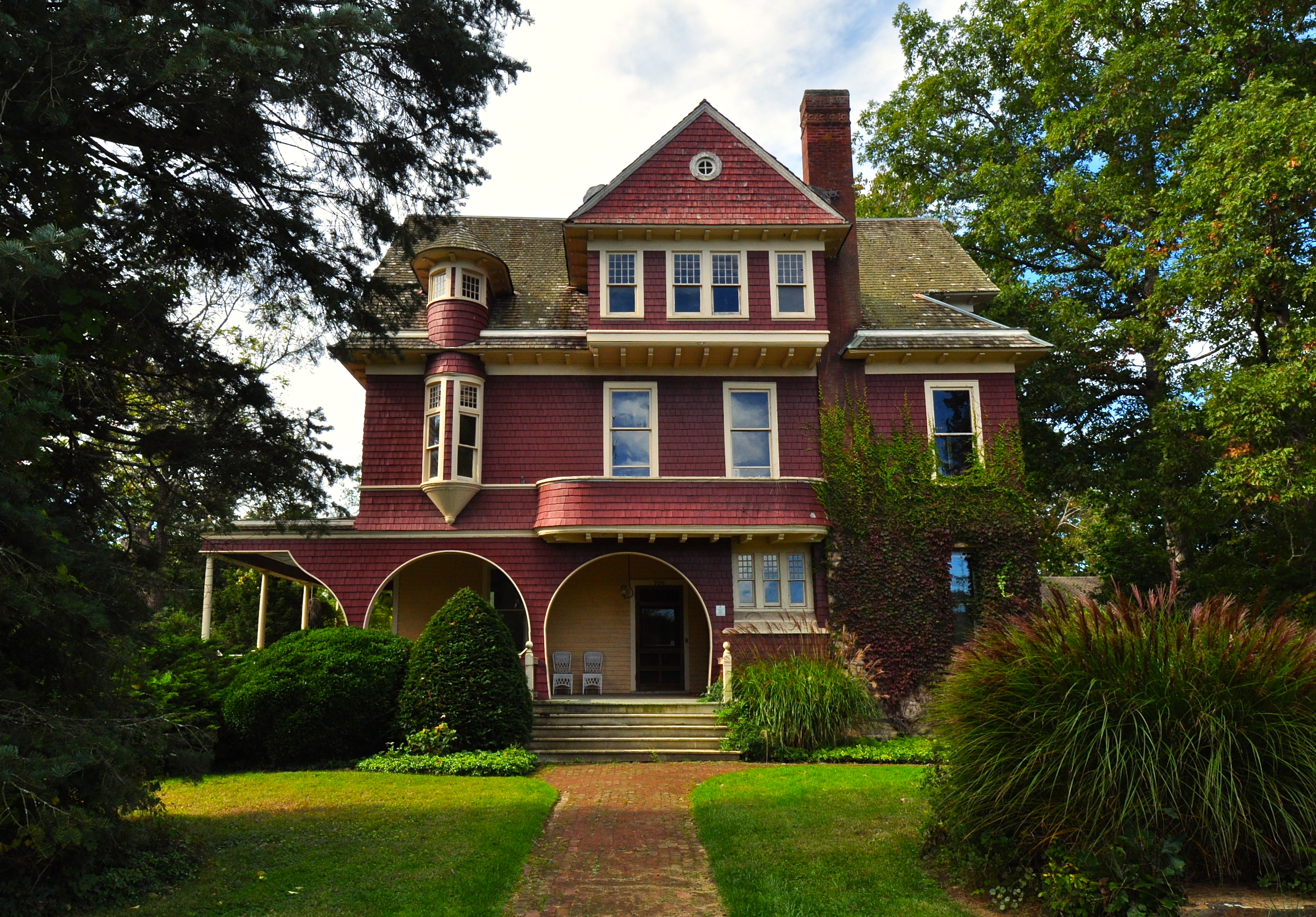
- Harvey House, October 2013

- Location within Virginia Location within the United States
- Location: 706 Harvey St., Radford, Virginia
- Coordinates: 37°7′41″N 80°34′13″W
- Area: 1 acre (0.40 ha)
- Built: 1891-92
- Architect: Frank Miles Day
- Architectural style: Queen Anne
- NRHP reference No.: 76002228
- VLR No.: 126-0001

Significant dates
- Added to NRHP: July 30, 1976
- Designated VLR: April 20, 1976

Harvey House, also known as the Dimmick-Harvey House, is a historic home located at Radford, Virginia. It was built in 1891–92 by J.K. Dimmock who started the Radford Foundry. When Dimmock left Radford, the house was inhabited by several families until the Harveys purchased the home, which is where its common name derives. The Harvey House is a large 2 1/2-story Queen Anne frame dwelling. Its rectangular plan by well known Philadelphia architect Frank Miles Day, features bays, an oriel window, and gabled dormers on a hipped roof. It also has a deep verandah with sinuous curves and shingled surfaces. Also on the property are a contributing early barn/workshop and a carriage house.

It was listed on the National Register of Historic Places in 1976.
