= Old Kennett Meetinghouse =

Historic church and cemetery in Chester County, Pennsylvania

- U.S. National Register of Historic Places
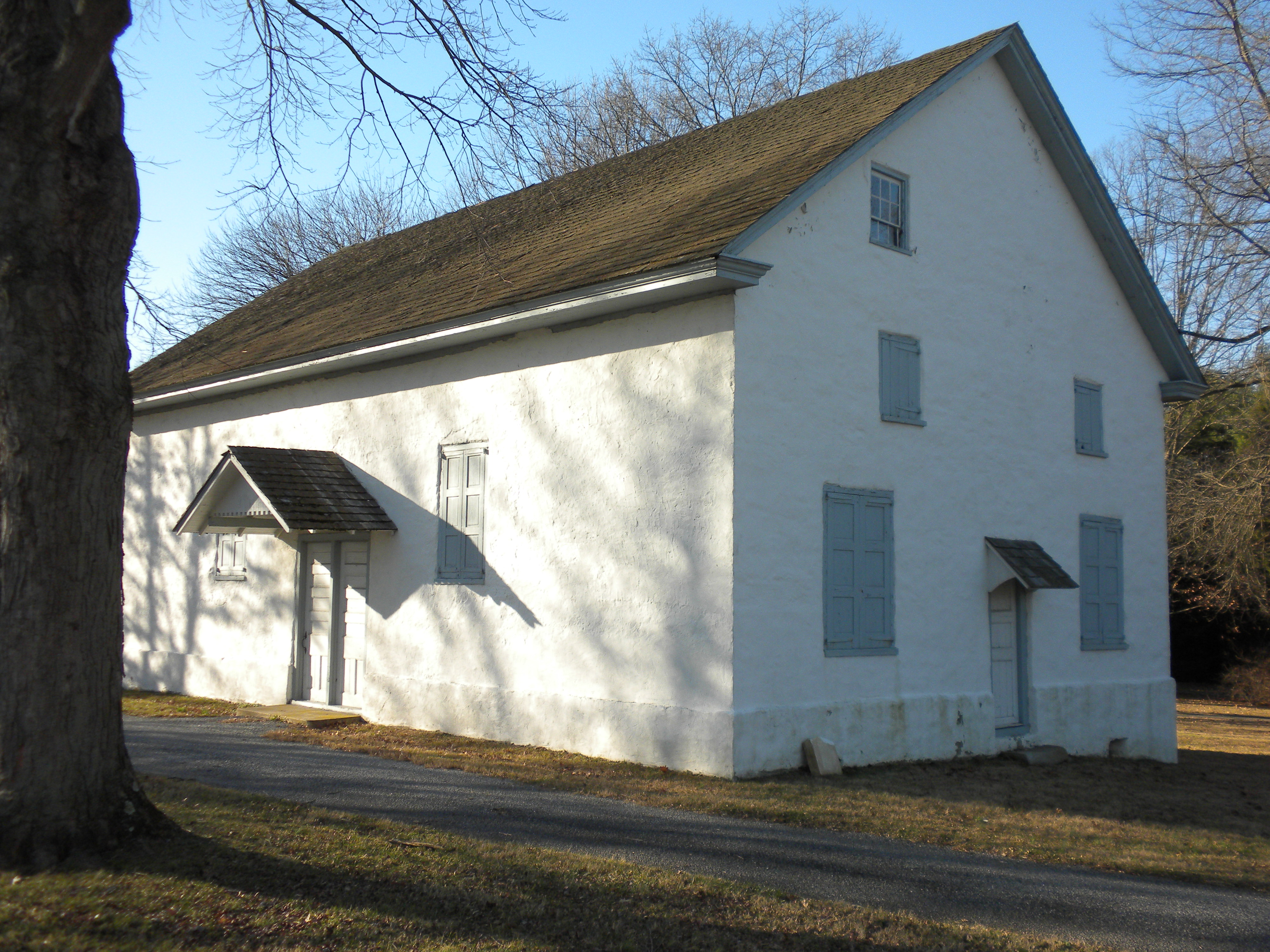
- Old Kennett Meetinghouse, December 2009

- Location within Pennsylvania Location within the United States
- Location: South of West Chester on U.S. Route 1, east of its junction with Pennsylvania Route 52, Kennett Square, Kennett Township, Pennsylvania
- Coordinates: 39°52′16″N 75°38′54″W
- Area: 4 acres (1.6 ha)
- Built: 1710
- NRHP reference No.: 74001776
- Added to NRHP: July 15, 1974

Old Kennett Meetinghouse is a historic meeting house of the Religious Society of Friends or "Quakers" in Kennett Township near Chadds Ford, Pennsylvania, United States.

== History ==
The Kennett Monthly Meeting house known as Old Kennett was first constructed in 1710 on land owned by Ezekiel Harlan, deeded from William Penn. Kennett and Marlboro Townships were being colonized by farming Quaker families who joined with members of New Castle Meeting, Hockessin Meeting and Centre Meeting (near Centerville Delaware) every four to six weeks for business meetings at Newark (New Ark) Meeting. Then, as Newark Meeting dwindled away, the Meetings united at the Old Kennett Meeting house, which then came to bear the name of Newark after the meeting of that name ceased to exist. In May, 1760, the named changed as Friends of Newark Monthly Meeting requested that the name be altered from Newark to that of Kennett.

During the Revolutionary War these Quakers adopted an official attitude of neutrality, but it was in the cemetery adjoining the Old Kennett Meeting House that the first shots of the Battle of the Brandywine were fired on September 11, 1777. Although the British and Hessian forces were surprised as they came 5000 strong from Kennett that morning, the small American force led by General Maxwell was driven back to the north hills of Chadds Ford. The soldiers killed in the battle that afternoon are buried in the adjoining Old Kennett Cemetery.

During the 19th century the membership of Kennett Meeting suffered divisions. The first was in 1812 when a new Kennett Meeting was formed within the Borough of Kennett Square. In 1827 Friends split into conservative and liberal sects, and by 1828 there were separate Kennett Monthly Meetings. The liberal group, the Hicksites, named after Elias Hicks, retained the old Kennett Meeting while the conservative Friends established Parkersville Friends Meetinghouse which was used until 1904.

Although Quakers had released their slaves before the revolution and worked to change the laws, those who could not agree to holding public anti-slavery meetings in the Meeting House made “progressive” friends so impatient that they left to form their own meeting. The Progressive Friends built the Longwood Meeting House and were disowned until 1874. The meetinghouse has hosted visitors including Lucretia Mott, William Lloyd Garrison, Sojourner Truth, Susan B. Anthony, and Harriet Tubman.

Gradually the membership of Old Kennett Meeting dwindled until in the early 1920s Meetings for Worship might have only one or two members sitting in the stillness of the ancient building. Since 1950 the Old Kennett Committee of Kennett Meeting (Kennett Square) has maintained the building, opening it for worship on the last Sunday of June, July, and August at 11 a.m. In July 1974 the Old Kennett Meeting house was placed on the National Register of Historic Places, making it nationally recognized as a historically and architecturally significant structure.

Old Kennett's tercentennial was celebrated in 2010 with a lecture series and historical tours being held at the meetinghouse.

The meetinghouse is open for Quaker Meeting-for-Worship on the last Sundays of June, July and August at 9:00 am and for occasional weddings, funerals and other events.
