= Peter Harvey House and Barn =

Historic house in Pennsylvania, United States

- U.S. National Register of Historic Places
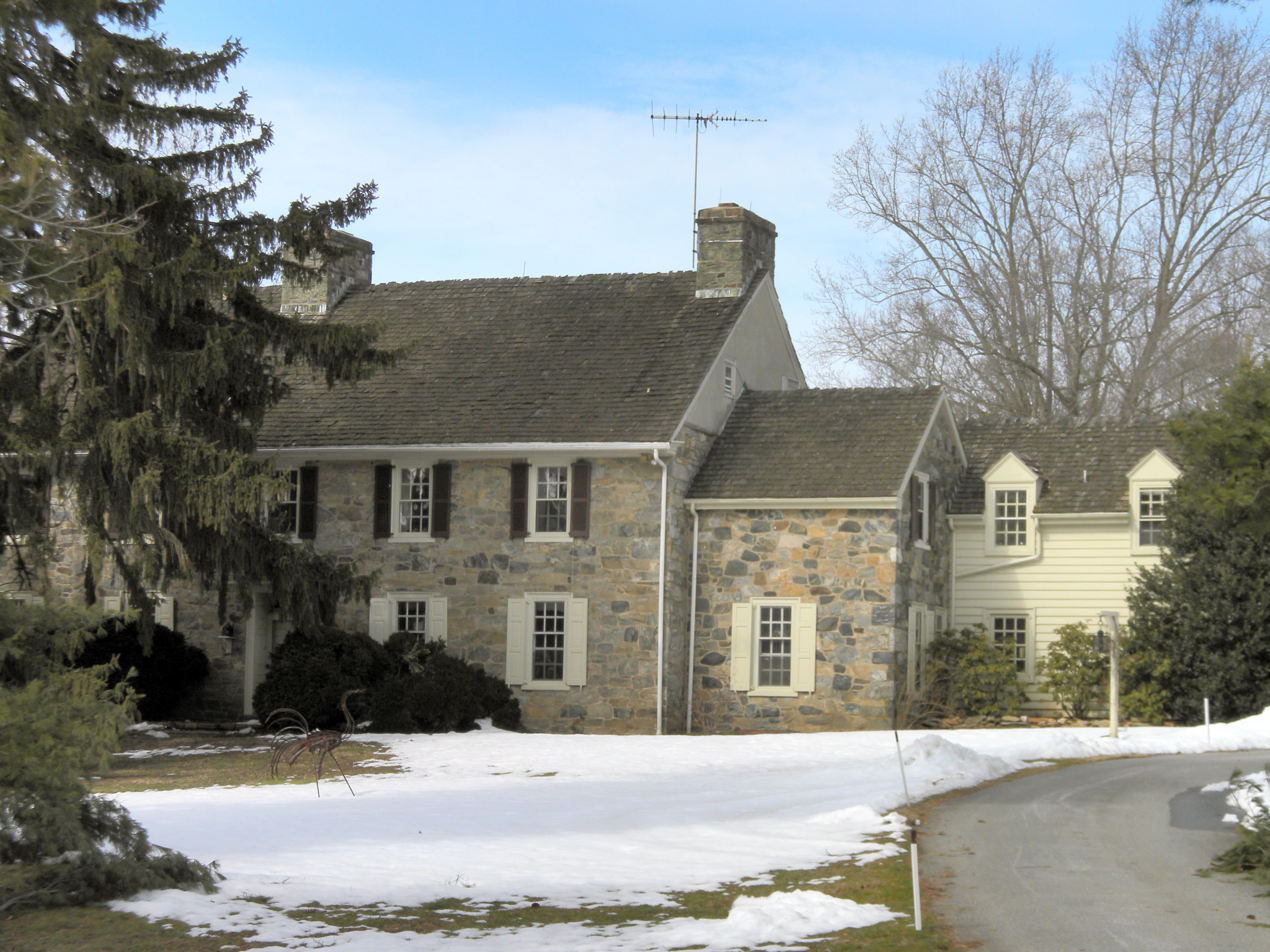
- Peter Harvey House, March 2010

- Location within Pennsylvania Location within the United States
- Location: East of Kennett Square on Hillendale Road near Mendenhall, Pennsbury Township, Pennsylvania
- Coordinates: 39°51′54″N 75°37′26″W
- Area: 1 acre (0.40 ha)
- Built: 1773-1777, 1834, 1940
- NRHP reference No.: 78002371
- Added to NRHP: April 20, 1978

The Peter Harvey House and Barn is an historic home and barn complex that is located in Pennsbury Township, Pennsylvania, United States.

It was added to the National Register of Historic Places in 1978.

== History and architectural features ==
The original house was built between 1773 and 1777, and is a 2 1/2-story, three-bay by two-bay, stone dwelling with a gable roof. It has two interior gable end chimneys and a front porch that added during the early twentieth century. The house was expanded in 1940, with a two-bay extension added to the house, making it five bays wide. At the same time, a smaller two-story, stone and frame addition was built onto the east gable end. Also located on the property is a large stone and frame bank barn that was built in 1834.
