= William Harvey House =

Historic house in Pennsylvania, United States

- U.S. National Register of Historic Places
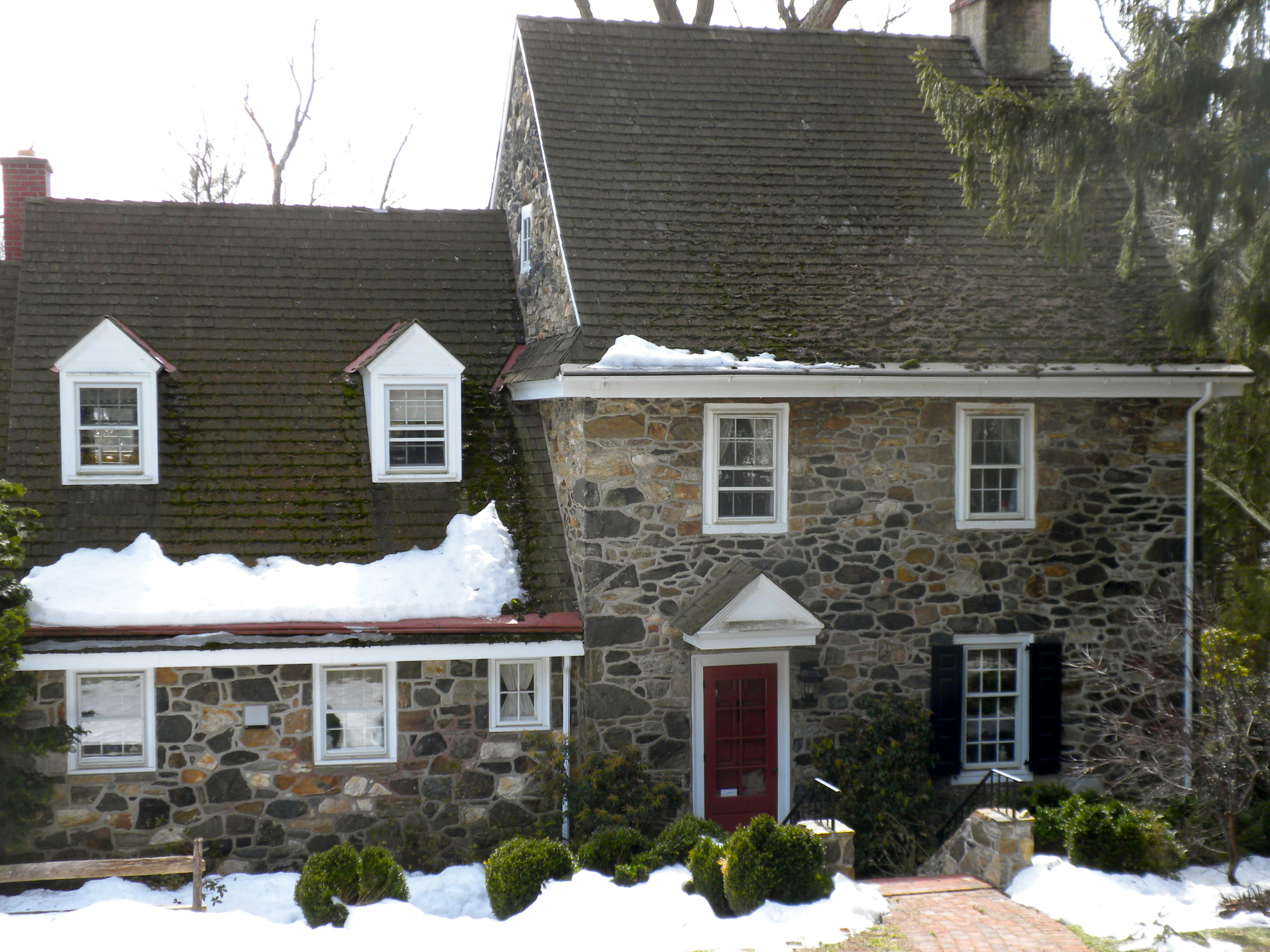
- William Harvey House, March 2010

- Location within Pennsylvania Location within the United States
- Location: Northwest of Chadds Ford on Brinton's Bridge Road off U.S. Route 1, Pennsbury Township, Pennsylvania
- Coordinates: 39°52′35″N 75°37′4″W
- Area: 7.8 acres (3.2 ha)
- Built: c. 1715
- NRHP reference No.: 71000690
- Added to NRHP: May 27, 1971

William Harvey House is a historic home located in Pennsbury Township, Chester County, Pennsylvania. The original house was built c. 1715, and is a 2 1/2- to 3 1/2-story, stone-banked dwelling. It is the earliest of the five Harvey family homes in Pennsbury Township.

William Harvey, a maker of malt, immigrated from Lye, Worcestershire, England prior to 1715. He purchased 300 acres (120 ha) of land in 1715. He died in 1754, leaving the house to his son, William Harvey. That son owned the house when it was in the line of fire during the Battle of Brandywine in 1777. A local legend holds that he refused to leave his home until a 12-pound (5.4 kg) cannonball came through the kitchen wall, however, a later register of damages from the British occupation shows a loss of farm animals, hay, and oats, but no claim for household goods.

Descriptions of the property from the will of the grandson of the original William Harvey show that no structural changes were made to the house between 1821 and a remodel sometime after 1926. The house was added to the National Register of Historic Places in 1971.
