= Pennsbury Township, Pennsylvania =

Township in Pennsylvania, US

Pennsbury Township
- Township
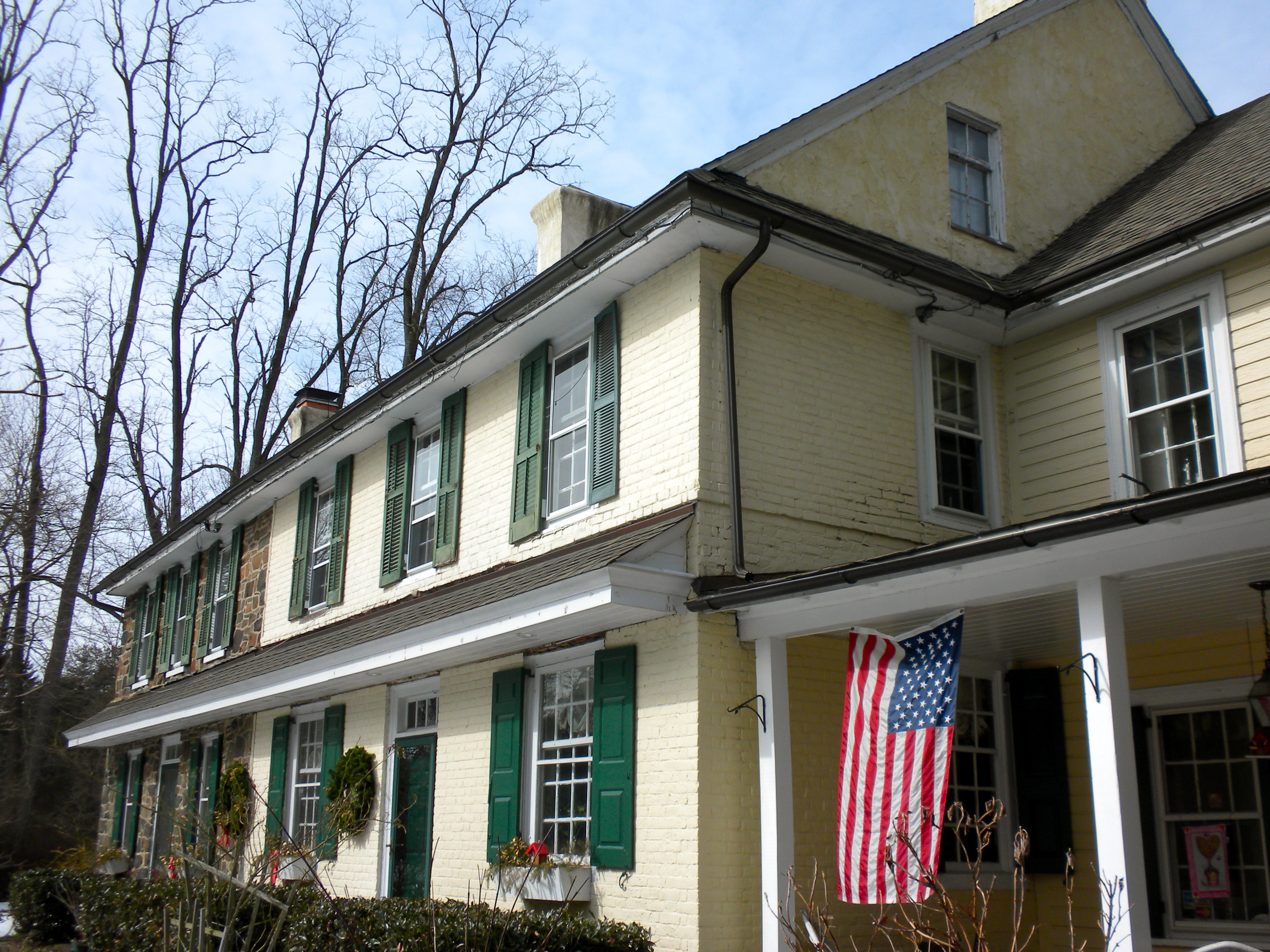
- Pennsbury Inn

- Location of Pennsbury Township in Chester County and of Pennsbury Township in Pennsylvania

- Location of Pennsylvania in the United States
- Coordinates: 39°52′00″N 75°36′59″W
- Country: United States
- State: Pennsylvania
- County: Chester

Area
  - Total: 10.05 sq mi (26.04 km^{2})
  - Land: 9.92 sq mi (25.70 km^{2})
  - Water: 0.13 sq mi (0.34 km^{2})
- Elevation: 246 ft (75 m)

Population (2010)
  - Total: 3,604
  - Estimate (2016): 3,661
  - Density: 368.9/sq mi (142.43/km^{2})
- Time zone: UTC−5 (EST)
  - Summer (DST): UTC−4 (EDT)
- Area code: 610
- FIPS code: 42-029-59136
- Website: www.pennsbury.pa.us

Pennsbury Township is a township in Chester County, Pennsylvania, United States. The population was 3,604 at the 2010 census.

== History ==
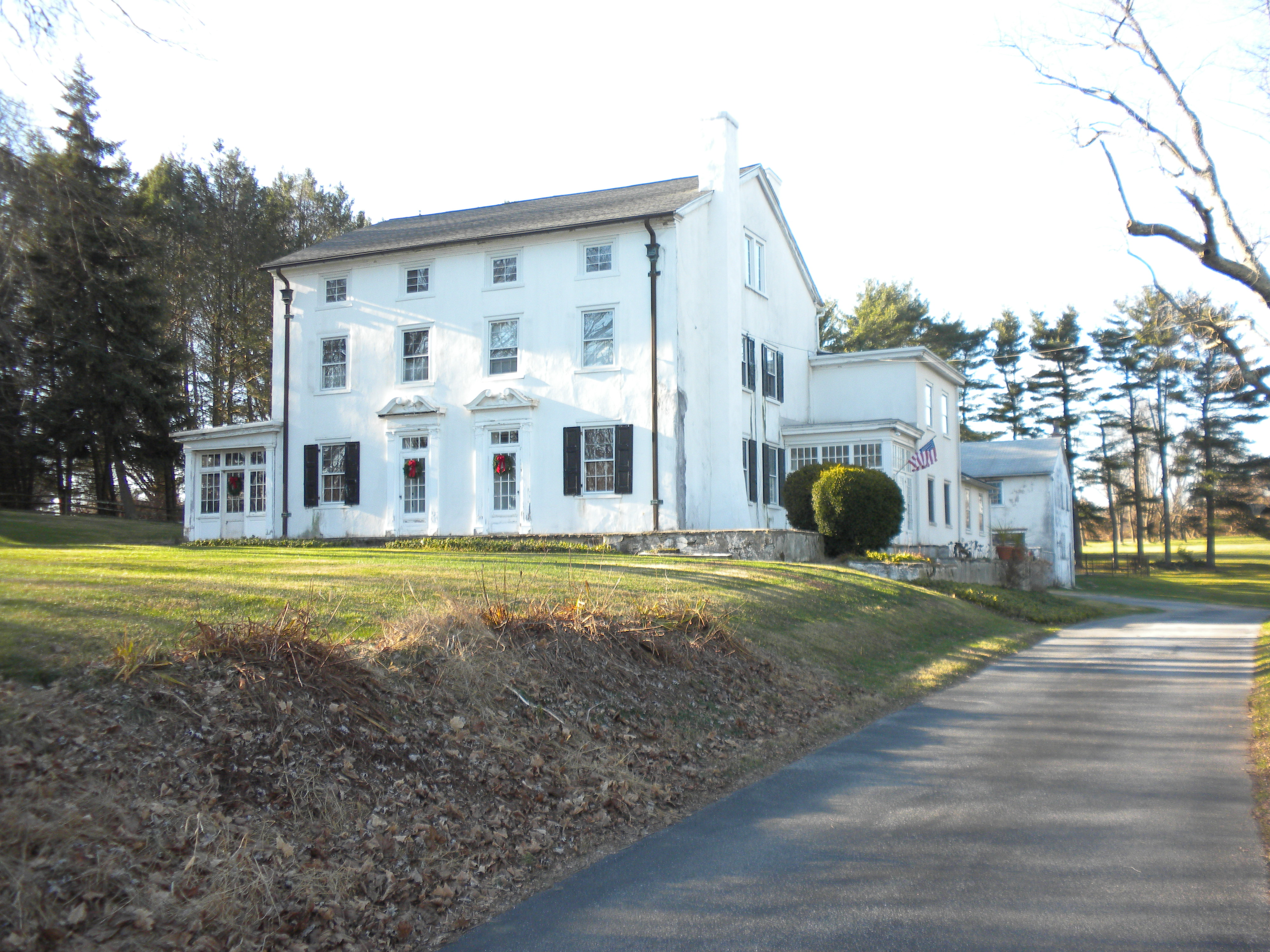
House on Brinton's Bridge Road in Pennsbury Township

The Barns-Brinton House, Brinton-King Farmstead, Fairville Historic District, Peter Harvey House and Barn, William Harvey House, Oakdale, Parkersville Friends Meetinghouse, Pennsbury Inn, William Peters House, and Springdale Farm are listed on the National Register of Historic Places.

== Geography ==
According to the United States Census Bureau, the township has a total area of 10.0 square miles (26 km^{2}), of which 9.9 square miles (26 km^{2}) is land and 0.1 square miles (0.26 km^{2}), or 1.10%, is water. Part of the census-designated place of Chadds Ford is in the eastern part of the township, though the historic village of Chadds Ford is to the east in Chadds Ford Township.

Pennsbury Township has a hot-summer humid continental climate (Dfa) bordering on a humid subtropical climate (Cfa) and the hardiness zone is 7a.

== Demographics ==
Historical population
Census	Pop.	Note	%±
1930	678		—
1940	660		−2.7%
1950	686		3.9%
1960	936		36.4%
1970	1,763		88.4%
1980	2,604		47.7%
1990	3,326		27.7%
2000	3,500		5.2%
2010	3,604		3.0%
2020	3,876		7.5%

At the 2010 census, the township was 93.6% non-Hispanic White, 0.7% Black or African American, 0.1% Native American, 3.1% Asian, and 1.2% were two or more races. Of the population, 1.4% were of Hispanic or Latino ancestry.

As of the census of 2000, there were 3,500 people, 1,387 households, and 990 families living in the township. The population density was 353.0 inhabitants per square mile (136.3/km^{2}). There were 1,438 housing units at an average density of 145.0 per square mile (56.0/km^{2}). The racial makeup of the township was 95.97% White, 0.71% African American, 0.11% Native American, 2.20% Asian, 0.20% from other races, and 0.80% from two or more races. Hispanic or Latino of any race were 1.54% of the population.

There were 1,387 households, out of which 26.6% had children under the age of 18 living with them, 65.9% were married couples living together, 3.8% had a female householder with no husband present, and 28.6% were non-families. 26.3% of all households were made up of individuals, and 20.1% had someone living alone who was 65 years of age or older. The average household size was 2.41 and the average family size was 2.91.

In the township the population was spread out, with 21.1% under the age of 18, 3.2% from 18 to 24, 19.5% from 25 to 44, 28.4% from 45 to 64, and 27.7% who were 65 years of age or older. The median age was 49 years. For every 100 females, there were 86.9 males. For every 100 females age 18 and over, there were 81.8 males.

The median income for a household in the township was $83,295, and the median income for a family was $106,304. Males had a median income of $84,136 versus $45,298 for females. The per capita income for the township was $52,530. None of the families and 1.2% of the population were living below the poverty line, including no under eighteens and none of those over 64.

== Education ==
Pennsbury Township lies within the Unionville-Chadds Ford School District.

== Notable people ==
- Joseph Bailey, U.S. Representative for Pennsylvania's 16th congressional district from 1861 to 1863 and Pennsylvania's 15th congressional district from 1863 to 1865
- Isaac Mendenhall, farmer, abolitionist, and station master on the Underground Railroad for more than 34 years

== Transportation ==
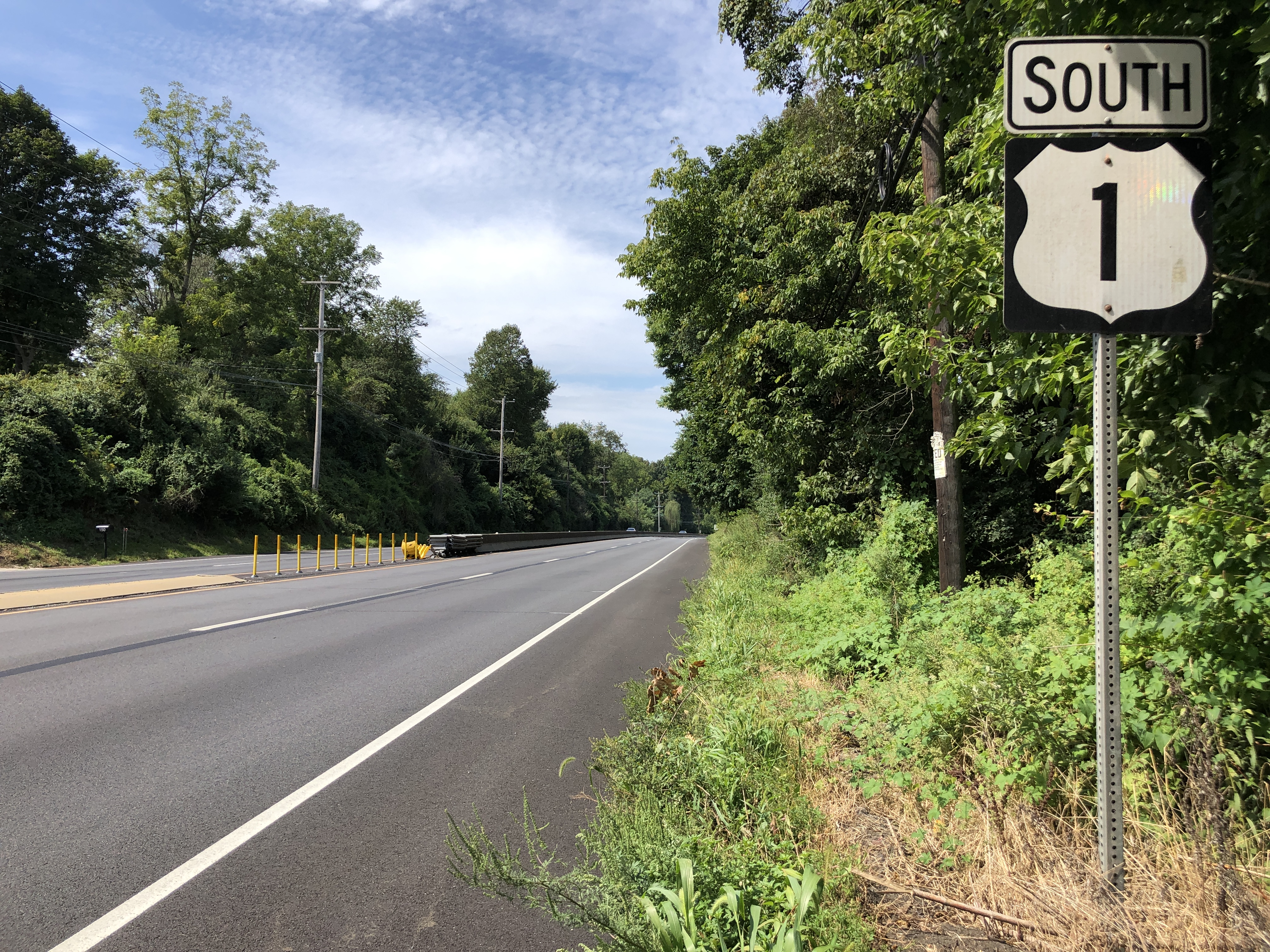
US 1 southbound in Pennsbury Township

As of 2022, there were 39.82 miles (64.08 km) of public roads in Pennsbury Township, of which 11.81 miles (19.01 km) were maintained by the Pennsylvania Department of Transportation (PennDOT) and 28.01 miles (45.08 km) were maintained by the township.

U.S. Route 1 is the most prominent highway serving Pennsbury Township. It follows the Baltimore Pike along an east-west alignment through the northern portion of the township. Pennsylvania Route 52 follows Lenape Road through the northwestern portion of the township, then follows Kennett Pike through the southwestern corner of the township. Finally, Pennsylvania Route 926 follows Street Road along a northeast-southwest alignment through the northwestern portion of the township.
