= Inn at 97 Winder =

Historic inn in Michigan, United States

- John Harvey House
- U.S. National Register of Historic Places
- U.S. Historic district – Contributing property
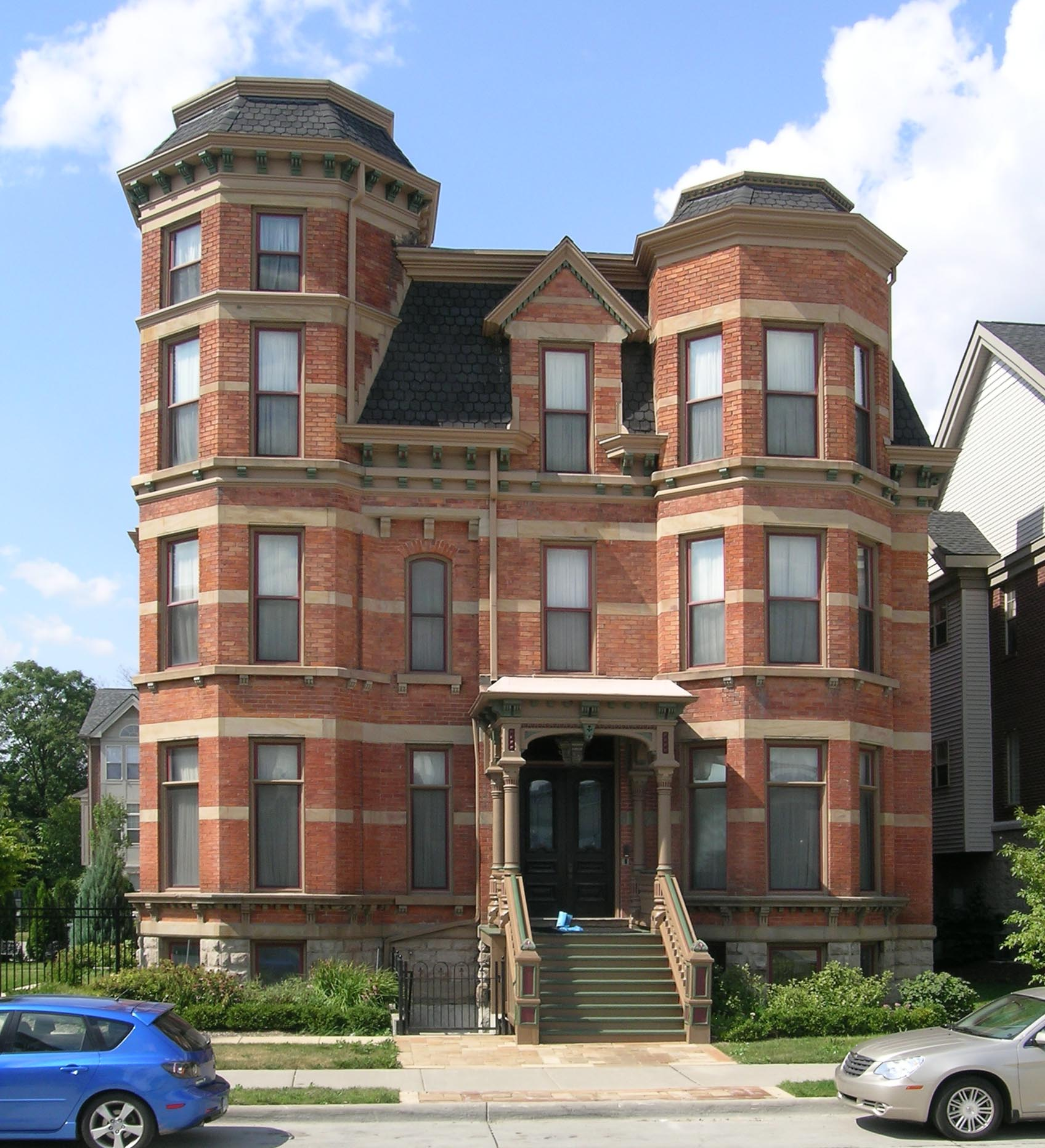
- The Inn at 97 Winder
- Interactive map
- Location: 97 Winder Street; Detroit, Michigan, U.S.
- Coordinates: 42°20′30″N 83°3′8″W
- Built: 1887
- Architect: John V. Smith
- Architectural style: Second Empire, Queen Anne
- NRHP reference No.: 91000354
- Added to NRHP: April 3, 1991

The Inn at 97 Winder is a luxurious historic Inn located at 97 Winder Street in Midtown Detroit, Michigan, within the Brush Park district. Originally known as the John Harvey House, it was listed on the National Register of Historic Places in 1991. The Detroit hotel is two blocks from Comerica Park and three blocks from Ford Field.

== History ==
John Harvey was a successful pharmacist in Detroit, but he is best known for his philanthropy in educating and feeding the city's poor children and orphans, beginning in the period just after the American Civil War and continuing into the early twentieth century. Harvey established Detroit's Industrial School and later the Sabbath Mission School to educate indigent children.

John Harvey died in 1905, but his widow lived in the house into the 1920s. In the 1920s, Jesse Hobbs, an automobile worker, purchased the home. In 1938, the structure was converted into a rooming house; some of the larger rooms were partitioned.

Developers purchased the John Harvey House in 1986, renovated the structure, and, in 2005, opened it as the historic Inn at 97 Winder with 10-room guest rooms.

== Architecture ==
John Harvey employed John V. Smith to design this house with its Second Empire, Queen Anne architecture, located in the prestigious Brush Park neighborhood. Originally completed in 1887, the John Harvey House is constructed of red brick atop an ashlar foundation with a mansard roof. The facade features a center entrance and wooden brackets supporting the sills of the multi-storied towers and window bays. The house has 11,000 square feet (1,000 m^{2}), eight marble fireplaces, and three-story staircase.
