= List of Iowa suffragists =

This is a list of Iowa suffragists, suffrage groups and others associated with the cause of women's suffrage in Iowa.

== Groups ==
- Afro-American Protective Association.
- Boone Equality Club.
- Chariton Equal Suffrage Society.
- Des Moines League of Colored Women Voters, formed in 1912.
- Iowa Equal Suffrage Association (IESA), formed as the Iowa Woman Suffrage Association (IWSA) in 1870.
- Iowa Federation of Colored Women's Clubs.
- Iowa Federation of Women's Clubs (IFWC).
- Iowa State Woman Suffrage Society.
- Men's League for Women's Suffrage, organized in 1910.
- Men's League of Perry.
- Northern Iowa Woman Suffrage Association, formed in 1869.
- Political Equality Club of Sioux City, formed in 1889.
- Polk County Suffrage Association.
- Waterloo Suffragette Council.
- Woman's Christian Temperance Union (WCTU).

== Suffragists ==
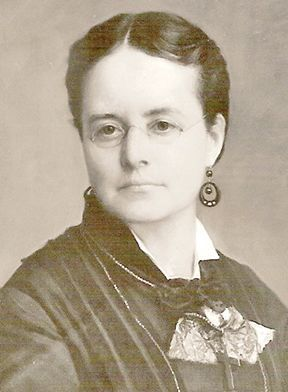
Annie Nowlin Savery 1831-1891

- Mary Newbury Adams.
- Teresa Adams (Davenport).
- Adelaide Ballard.
- Mary A. Beavers (Mount Pleasant).
- Evelyn H. Belden.
- Narcissa T. Bemis.
- Amelia Bloomer (Council Bluffs).
- Sue M. Wilson Brown (Des Moines).
- Martha C. Callanan.
- Margaret W. Campbell.
- Carrie Chapman Catt (Charles City).
- Nettie Sanford Chapin (Marshalltown).
- Mary Jane Coggeshall.
- Fannie Wilson Cooper (Des Moines).
- Mary Darwin (Burlington).
- Keziah Anderson Dorrance (Taylor County).
- Helen Downey.
- Joseph Dugdale (Mount Pleasant).
- Marion Howard Dunham (Burlington).
- Flora Dunlap (Des Moines).
- Susan Frances Nelson Ferree (1844–1919).
- Susan Fessenden (1840–1932) (Sioux City).
- Matilda Fletcher (Council Bluffs).
- Mariana Thompson Folsom.
- Alvah and Martha Frisbie
- Eleanor Gordon (Boone).
- Eliza H. Hunter.
- Caroline Ingham (Kossuth County).
- Harvey Ingham (Kossuth County).
- Effie McCollum Jones (1869–1952) – Universalist minister and suffragist.
- Grace Morris Allen Jones (Burlington).
- Jennie A. Kilburne (Adair County).
- Anna B. Lawther (Dubuque).
- James Rush Lincoln.
- Mabel Lodge (Cedar Falls).
- Arabella Mansfield.
- Jennie McCowen (1845–1924) – physician, writer, lecturer, medical journal editor, suffragist.
- Jane Amy McKinney.
- Hattie Moore (Mrs. James F.) Mitchell (1866-1943) - professor of methodology at Drake University, popular speaker at teacher institutes and Chautauquas
- Carrie Dean Pruyn.
- Lizzie Bunnell Read (Algona).
- Gertrude Rush.
- Mary Safford.
- Anna H. Satterly.
- Annie Nowlin Savery (Des Moines).
- Vivian Smith
- Rowena Edson Stevenson (Boone).
- Adeline Morrison Swain.
- Mary Beaumont Welch (Ames).
- Alda Heaton Wilson.
- Henrietta Wilson (Dubuque).
- Mattie Woods.

=== Politicians supporting women's suffrage ===
- Cyrus C. Carpenter.
- William L. Harding.
- William Larrabee.
- Benjamin F. Murray (Winterset).
- Henry O'Connor.
- William G. Wilson (Davis County).

== Publications ==
- Woman's Standard, created in 1886.

== Suffragists campaigning in Iowa ==
- Jane Addams.
- Susan B. Anthony.
- Henry Browne Blackwell.
- Martha H. Brinkerhoff.
- Laura Clay.
- Phoebe Couzins.
- Hannah Tracy Cutler.
- Emma Smith DeVoe.
- Anna Dickinson.
- Frances Dana Gage.
- Helen M. Gougar.
- Laura A. Gregg.
- Ella Harrison.
- Mary Garrett Hay.
- Matilda Hindman.
- Laura M. Johns.
- Addie M. Johnson.
- Elizabeth A. Kingsbury.
- Catharine Waugh McCulloch.
- Henrietta G. Moore.
- Anna Howard Shaw.
- Elizabeth Cady Stanton.
- Sarah Burger Stearns.
- Lucy Stone.
- Harriet Taylor Upton.
- Frances Woods.

== See also ==
- List of American suffragists
- Women's suffrage in Iowa
- Timeline of women's suffrage in Iowa
- Women's suffrage in states of the United States
- Women's suffrage in the United States
