= Women's suffrage in Iowa =

U.S. state gender equality movement

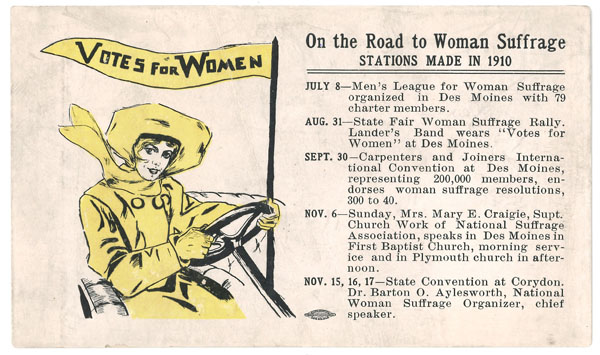
Iowa Equal Suffrage Association postcard from 1910

Efforts toward women's suffrage began early in Iowa's history. During the territory's Constitutional Convention, discussions on both African American and women's suffrage took place. Early on, women's rights were discussed in the state by women such as Amelia Bloomer and petitions for suffrage were sent to the Iowa state legislature. While African American men earned the right to vote in 1868, women from all backgrounds had to continue to agitate for enfranchisement. One of the first suffrage groups was formed in Dubuque in 1869. Not long after, a state suffrage convention was held in Mount Pleasant in 1870. Iowa suffragists focused on organizing and lobbying the state legislature. In 1894, women gained the right to vote on municipal bond and tax issues and also in school elections. These rights were immediately utilized by women who turned out in good numbers to vote on these issues. By the 1910s, the state legislature finally passed in successive sessions a women's suffrage amendment to the state constitution. This resulted in a voter referendum to be held on the issue on June 5, 1916. The campaign included anti-suffrage agitation from liquor interests who claimed that women's suffrage would cause higher taxes. The amendment was defeated, though a subsequent investigation turned up a large amount of fraud. However, the election could not be invalidated and women had to wait to vote. On July 2, 1919, Iowa became the tenth state to ratify the Nineteenth Amendment.

== Early efforts ==
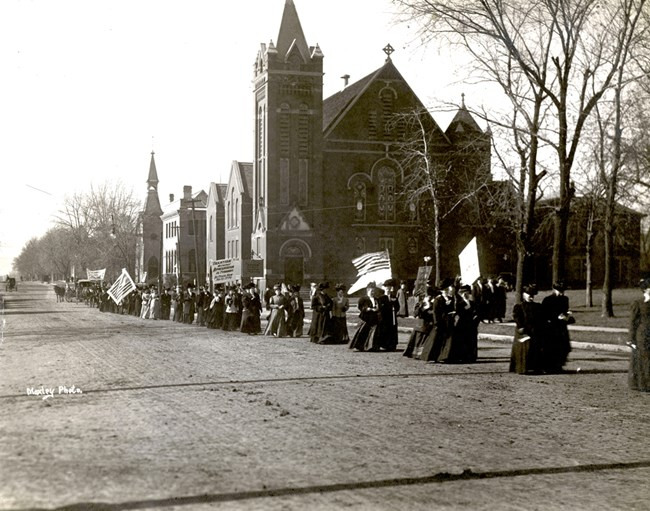
Suffragists march in Boone, Iowa on October 29, 1908

The Iowa state legislature first addressed women's suffrage in 1843 when the issue was briefly addressed during a discussion about allowing women to view legislative proceedings. When the discussion of the state constitution turned to allowing African Americans the right to vote in 1844, there was also a discussion about women's suffrage at the same time. Frances Dana Gage was the first woman to address people in Iowa on women's rights issues when she came to the state in 1854, lecturing on women's rights in Oskaloosa. Not long after Amelia Bloomer moved to Council Bluffs in April 1855, she also began to lecture on various topics, including women's right to vote. During the next state constitutional convention in 1857, there was again a discussion on women's suffrage, which however didn't lead to any changes either for Black or women voters.

Suffragists in Clinton County sent the Iowa House of Representatives a petition to amend the state constitution for women to vote. During the legislative session of 1866, there were continued discussions and finally a resolution for women's suffrage created which did not make it out of the committee. A separate bill to remove the word "white" from the description of a voter did pass. On November 3, 1868, voters in Iowa approved a referendum to allow African American men to vote. After this success, women sent in petitions and memorials from around the state, asking for women's suffrage. The editor of the Fort Dodge North West wrote that "it was not to the credit of the state that Black men earned the right to vote before white women did." The editor of the DeWitt Observer said he hoped that since African American men could vote, that the state could now approve women's right to vote. The Des Moines Register also wrote in December 1868 that women should have the "ballot whenever she expressed the wish for it."

In 1869, the Northern Iowa Woman's Suffrage Association (NIWSA) was formed in Dubuque. The group met at the home of Henrietta Wilson. The committee of NIWSA resolved to send a delegation to the Equal Suffrage Convention being held in New York in May of that year. During the summer of 1869, NIWSA sponsored several lectures and events, including a reading from the Declaration of Independence by Edna Snell. At the end of the year, in December, Elizabeth Cady Stanton came to Dubuque and lectured in a few other cities in Iowa on women's suffrage.

In 1870, Iowa suffragists and even the editor of the Des Moines Register, were hopeful that women's suffrage would be passed in the state. In the General Assembly, the Committee on Constitutional Amendments discussed removing the word "male" from the description of a voter. On March 29, 1870, a hearing on removing the word from the state constitution was held, with Bloomer in attendance. The House passed the motion to amend the constitution. On the next day, the State Senate heard the bill and Mary E. Spencer, the first woman to work for the Iowa legislature, reported on the actions of the House the previous day. The Senate also passed the bill, but it would have to pass a second time at the next legislative session before it could go out for a referendum.

The first women's suffrage convention in the state was held on June 16 and 17 in 1870 at Mount Pleasant. At the convention, organized by Joseph Dugdale, the Iowa Woman Suffrage Association (IWSA) was created with Henry O'Connor as president and Bloomer as vice president. Four months later, a local suffrage group was formed by prominent women in Des Moines. The women involved included Mary Darwin, Mattie Griffith, Nettie Sanford, and Annie Nowlin Savery. During this time, the news attempted to cast the IWSA as a proponent of "free-love" and against marriage in order to discredit the movement. On October 25, 1870, suffragists in Polk County also organized their own group.

After the passage of the Fourteenth and Fifteenth Amendments, many women around the country attempted to use the language of the amendments to argue that women's suffrage was now legal. In 1871, the Clarinda voting registry board added the names of women who lived there to the voting rolls. When this information came out, several men ensured their wives names were removed. In addition, some women also asked to have their names taken off the list of registered voters. In Taylor County in 1871, Keziah Anderson (later Keziah Anderson Dorrance) became the first woman in Iowa to vote. Her vote was considered valid because William Anderson and Edwin Henshaw were both suffrage supporters, and more importantly, election judges for the county.

Efforts to bring a women's suffrage amendment came out of a 1874 state Republican Convention platform promise. In 1876, the governor and the state House both supported a suffrage amendment to the state constitution. The vote failed by one in the state Senate for unknown reasons.

A women's suffrage bill was passed in the state Senate in 1884, but did not pass in the House. An attempt to pass a municipal and school suffrage bill was brought up in 1886, but didn't come up for a vote. Another attempt to pass municipal and school suffrage came up in 1888, but did not pass in the House.

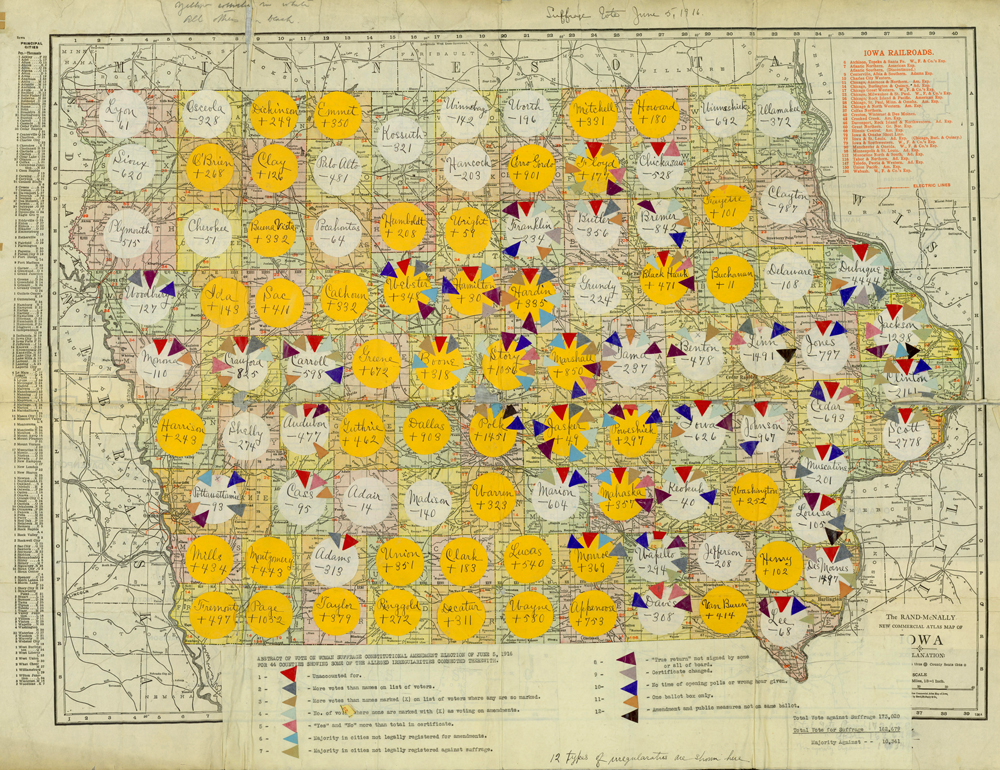
Mapping loss of women's suffrage amendment in Iowa after June 5, 1916

Carrie Chapman Catt first became involved with organized women's suffrage in October 1889 where she attended and spoke at the IWSA conference in Oskaloosa. The next month, she started the Political Equality Club of Sioux City. She then toured throughout the state and helped organize or reorganize women's suffrage groups in various cities.

During the 1890 General Assembly, Governor William Larrabee advocated for partial suffrage for women in the state. A municipal and school suffrage bills were proposed, but wasn't voted on in the state legislature. In the next session, in 1892, a bill to allow women to vote for president came up, but didn't make it out of Committee.

In February 1894, two partial women's suffrage bills were introduced in the state legislature. Journalists from The Woman's Standard followed the proceedings of the legislators on these bills. The Standard pushed back against legislators who claimed that women didn't want the vote by printing petitions from women in their own jurisdictions. By March, a combination municipal and school suffrage bill, called the Watkins Bill, passed the state House. On April 13, the General Assembly as a whole passed the municipal and school suffrage law. Women could now vote on municipal bond and tax issues and also for school elections.

Women immediately began to use their new right to vote. On May 23, the New Era of Humeston reported that women might be able to exercise their right to vote in Indianola on a bond issue for water works. Also in 1894, women throughout the county came together to support a new library tax for Waterloo. Women didn't have to register to vote, but they used separate ballots and a separate ballot box. Women in Ames came out to vote for the water works project in 1896 where they also saw their own limitations as men were allowed to vote for city officers. After the success of women voting, IWSA began to work on pushing for a state constitutional amendment for women's suffrage. The Ames experience in 1896 was also instrumental in showing the limitations of partial suffrage.

The National American Woman Suffrage Association (NAWSA) held their annual convention in Des Moines in January 1897. By this time, there were a total of 235 active suffrage groups in the state. The next year, IWSA created a legislative committee to petition for a state amendment. Evelyn H. Belden was the chair for the committee and worked with Mary Garrett Hay to lobby the state legislature. Catt ensured that a state suffrage office was placed in Des Moines before the opening of the 1898 legislative session. In 1900, petitions for women's suffrage with more than 100,000 signatures were sent to the state legislature. This led to legislation that failed in the state Senate by only one vote. In 1902, more legislation was passed, this time in the Senate, and failing in the House. The subsequent two sessions in 1904 and 1906 also had narrow losses on women's suffrage amendment bills.

== Continued efforts ==
One of the first suffrage parades in the United States took place in Iowa, at Boone in 1908. The parade was organized by Rowena Stevens who was the president of the suffrage organization in Boone. Anna Howard Shaw agreed to speak at the event and brought two English suffragettes with her. Despite the cold and windy day, the parade began, including members of the Boone WCTU. The parade had a marching band and Shaw drove in a car with the suffragettes. Other marchers included Eleanor Gordon, Mary J. Coggeshall, and members of the Woman's Christian Temperance Union (WCTU). Shaw's speech was well attended and the parade was considered a success by suffrage leaders in helping to promote women's suffrage in Iowa.

In 1912, the Progressive, Prohibition, Republican, and Socialist parties in Iowa officially endorsed women's suffrage. The next year, both the state House and Senate passed a women's suffrage resolution, which would have to pass again in the next session in 1915. During the next legislative session, the resolution passed the Senate 38 to 11 and the House by 84 to 19. The referendum for the amendment would be voted on in the next primary election on June 5, 1916.

Carrie Chapman Catt returned to Iowa in 1916 to help train suffragists in campaigning and conducting her own well-attended lectures. On May 4, 1916, she spoke to 1,400 people in Waterloo and the Grand Opera House in Dubuque was standing-room only on May 21.

During the campaign, anti-suffragists in the state promoted the idea that women's suffrage would lead to higher taxes. Groups called Farmer's Tax-Payers' Leagues started to appear in every county. A controversy over spending tax money on hard roads in the state led to a rumor that women wanted these roads "estimated to cost millions of dollars, in order that they might ride into the country comfortably in their automobiles!" With women seeming to be the push behind a large tax project, many voters did not want them to become enfranchised. Ads that promoted the idea that women's suffrage would lead to higher taxes began to appear in newspapers. These ads were paid for by a lawyer, Henry Thuenen, who represented Iowa brewers, who were mostly against women's suffrage. The state Republican party had also decided a few weeks before the election to "kill the suffrage amendment quietly." The amendment failed on June 5 statewide by 10,341 votes.

After the defeat of the woman suffrage amendment, the WCTU conducted an investigation and found that "thousands of unregistered votes were cast on the amendment" which was illegal. They obtained 200 pages of affidavits showing election violations. There were also 29,341 more votes for the suffrage amendment than all other votes cast for state governor. Despite the likelihood of fraud, it was impossible to declare the result of the election invalid because there was no legal recourse to invalidate the election.

During the legislative session of 1917 legislators would not hear petitions for a new election because of the fraud and called suffragists "poor sports." Activists lobbying the legislators eventually dropped the fraud angle and requested the passage of a new women's suffrage amendment. The amendment bill passed and would again have to pass in the next session in 1919.

In January 1919, Governor William Harding urged the legislature to ratify the federal suffrage amendment. On July 2, 1919, Iowa became the tenth state to ratify the Nineteenth Amendment.

== African American women's suffrage ==
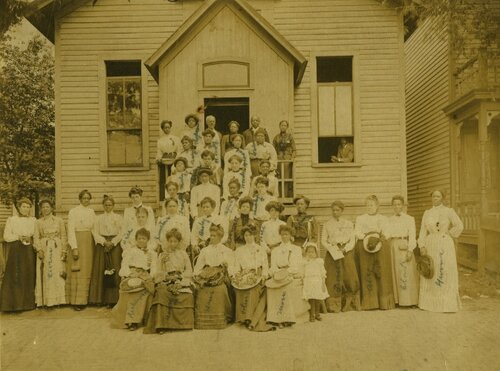
Iowa Association of Colored Women's Clubs meeting in Davenport, May 1903

In 1885 the Polk County Woman Suffrage Association (PCWSA) met with African American suffragists and discussed ways that the two groups could work together. When women in Iowa earned the right to vote in a limited fashion in 1894, Black newspapers in the state reported that "women were especially keen and capable voters."

Activists like Sue M. Wilson Brown and Helen Downey from Des Moines set up clubs and were actively involved in the Iowa Federation of Colored Women's Clubs (IFCWC) which supported women's suffrage. IFCWC declared its support for women's suffrage at their Sioux City convention in 1911. In 1912, Brown created the Des Moines League of Colored Women Voters and continued to work with PCWSA. Brown was an active suffragist, marching in parades, giving speeches, and distributing promotional materials about suffrage. After the Nineteenth Amendment was ratified, Brown helped voters cast ballots in the 1920 election. Gertrude Rush, the first African American woman lawyer in Iowa, was also active in suffrage work in Des Moines.

In Buxton, African American women marched in support of women's suffrage. One of the participants was Mattie Woods, a member of the IFCWC. Vivian B. Smith was also involved in suffrage work in Buxton, where she was a member of the Waterloo Suffragette Council and later became a member of the IFCWC suffrage committee.

== Anti-suffragists in Iowa ==
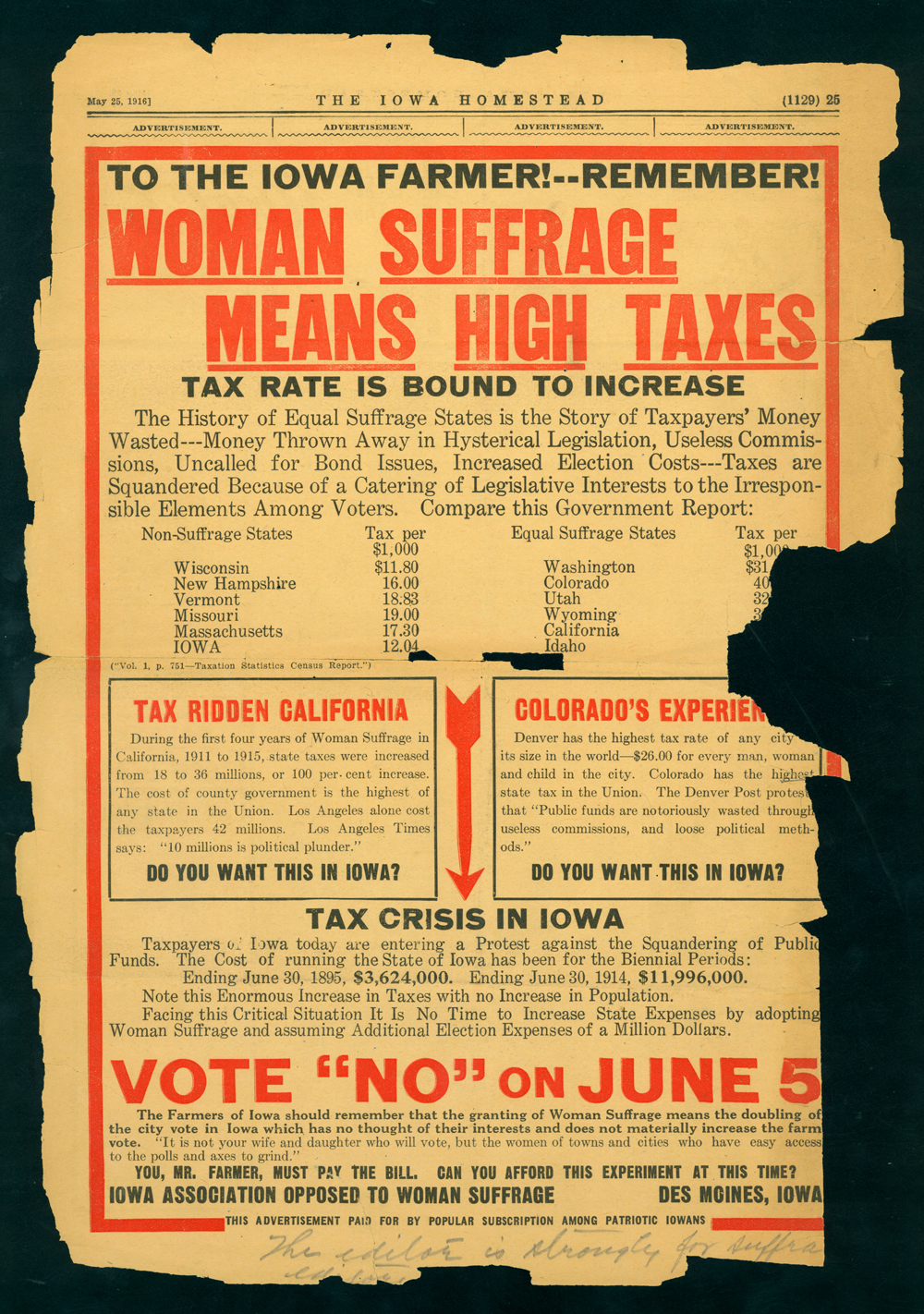
Anti-suffrage advertisement run the Iowa Homestead on May 25, 1916

Anti-suffrage politicians like state senator, David J. Palmer, claimed that because women were meant to rule over the domestic sphere, that allowing them to vote would be detrimental to society. Some women embraced this idea for different reasons. They found power in their lives as "domestic, ethical figures" and influenced politics through women's clubs. Women like these believed that their method of influencing politics was free from the corrupting influence of party politics.

Others opposed women's suffrage due to many women being prohibitionists, fearing that they would outlaw alcohol. When John Irish, a former supporter of women's suffrage turned anti-suffragist, came back to Iowa from California in 1916, he was most likely supported by liquor interests. He spread the word that since women had earned the right to vote in California in 1911, there were more taxes, more political corruption, and "suffrage had put lines in women's faces."

== See also ==
- List of Iowa suffragists
- Timeline of women's suffrage in Iowa
- Women's suffrage in states of the United States
- Women's suffrage in the United States
