= Timeline of women's suffrage in Iowa =

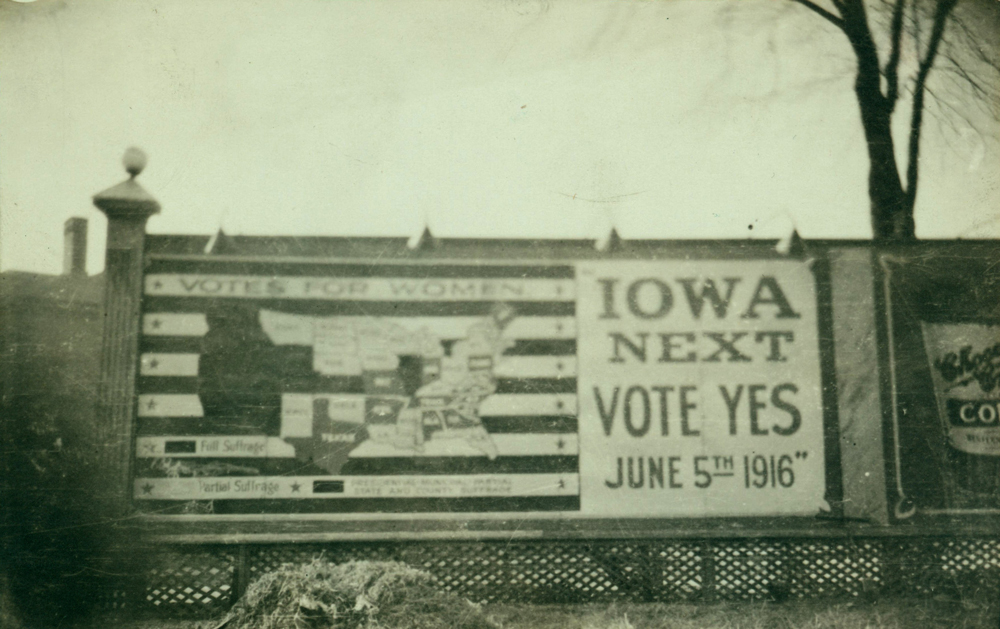
Iowa Women's suffrage billboard June 5, 1916

This is a timeline of women's suffrage in Iowa. Women's suffrage work started early in Iowa's history. Organizing began in the late 1860s with the first state suffrage convention taking place in 1870. In the 1890s, women gained the right to vote on municipal bonds, tax efforts and school-related issues. By 1916, a state suffrage amendment went to out to a voter referendum, which failed. Iowa was the tenth state to ratify the Nineteenth Amendment in 1919.

== 19th century ==
=== 1840s ===
1843

- Iowa State Legislature discusses women's suffrage alongside other issues relating to women.

1844

- During the state constitutional convention, there were discussions about both African American and women's suffrage.

=== 1850s ===
1854

- Frances Dana Gage speaks about women's rights and voting in Oskaloosa.

1855

- Amelia Bloomer is the first resident of Iowa to discuss women's suffrage in the state.

1857

- The Iowa state constitution only allows only white men to vote. Women's suffrage is also discussed during these sessions.

=== 1860s ===
1866

- Suffragists in Clinton County present a petition to the state house to support a state constitutional amendment for women's suffrage.
- The suffrage bill does not pass out of the Iowa state senate.

1868

- November 3: The word "white" to describe a voter is removed from the state constitution after a successful voter referendum passes.

1869

- Mary Newbury Adams organizes the Northern Iowa Woman Suffrage Association (NIWSA).

=== 1870s ===
1870

- March: The first state constitutional amendment bill for women's suffrage passes and must pass again in 1872.
- June 16-17: The first state suffrage convention is held in Mount Pleasant. The Iowa Equal Suffrage Association (IESA) is created.
- October 25: The Polk County Suffrage Society is organized.

1871

- Clarinda voter registry board adds the names of women to the list of voters, but most are removed later.
- Keziah Anderson Dorrance casts her vote in Taylor County and friendly judges uphold it as a valid vote. Dorrance became the first woman to vote in Iowa.
- October: The state suffrage convention is held in Des Moines.

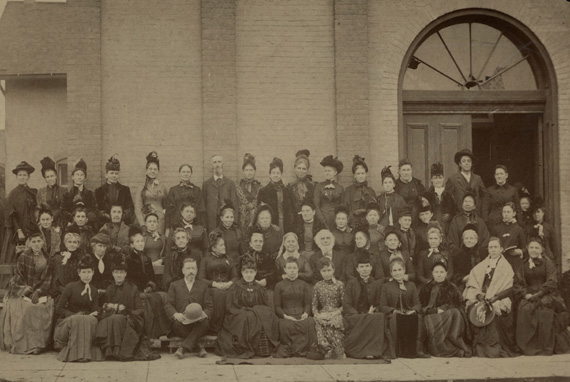
Iowa state suffrage convention in Oskaloosa, 1889 Carrie Chapman Catt in center

1872

- The suffrage bill does not pass a second time.

1873

- March: State suffrage convention is held.

1874

- Iowa state Republicans promise to work towards a women's suffrage amendment.

1876

- The Iowa Governor and the state House both support a suffrage amendment.

1877

- The Iowa chapter of the Woman's Christian Temperance Union (WCTU) comes out in support of women's suffrage during their convention in Ottumwa.

=== 1880s ===
1884

- A women's suffrage bill passes in the state Senate, but not the state House.
- November 27–28: The state suffrage convention was held in Des Moines.

1885

- October 21–22: The state suffrage convention is held in Cedar Rapids.

1886

- A municipal suffrage bill is proposed but does not come up for a full vote.
- The state suffrage convention takes place in Otumwa.
- September: The Woman's Standard is founded and Mary J. Coggeshall and Martha C. Callanan serve as editors.

1887

- State suffrage convention is held in Des Moines.

1888

- State suffrage convention is held in Ames and Susan B. Anthony speaks.
- Anti-suffragists stage an anti-suffrage parade in Davenport.

1889

- October 30–November 1: The state suffrage convention is held in Oskaloosa. Henry Browne Blackwell and Lucy Stone attended.
- November: Carrie Chapman Catt starts the Political Equality Club of Sioux City.

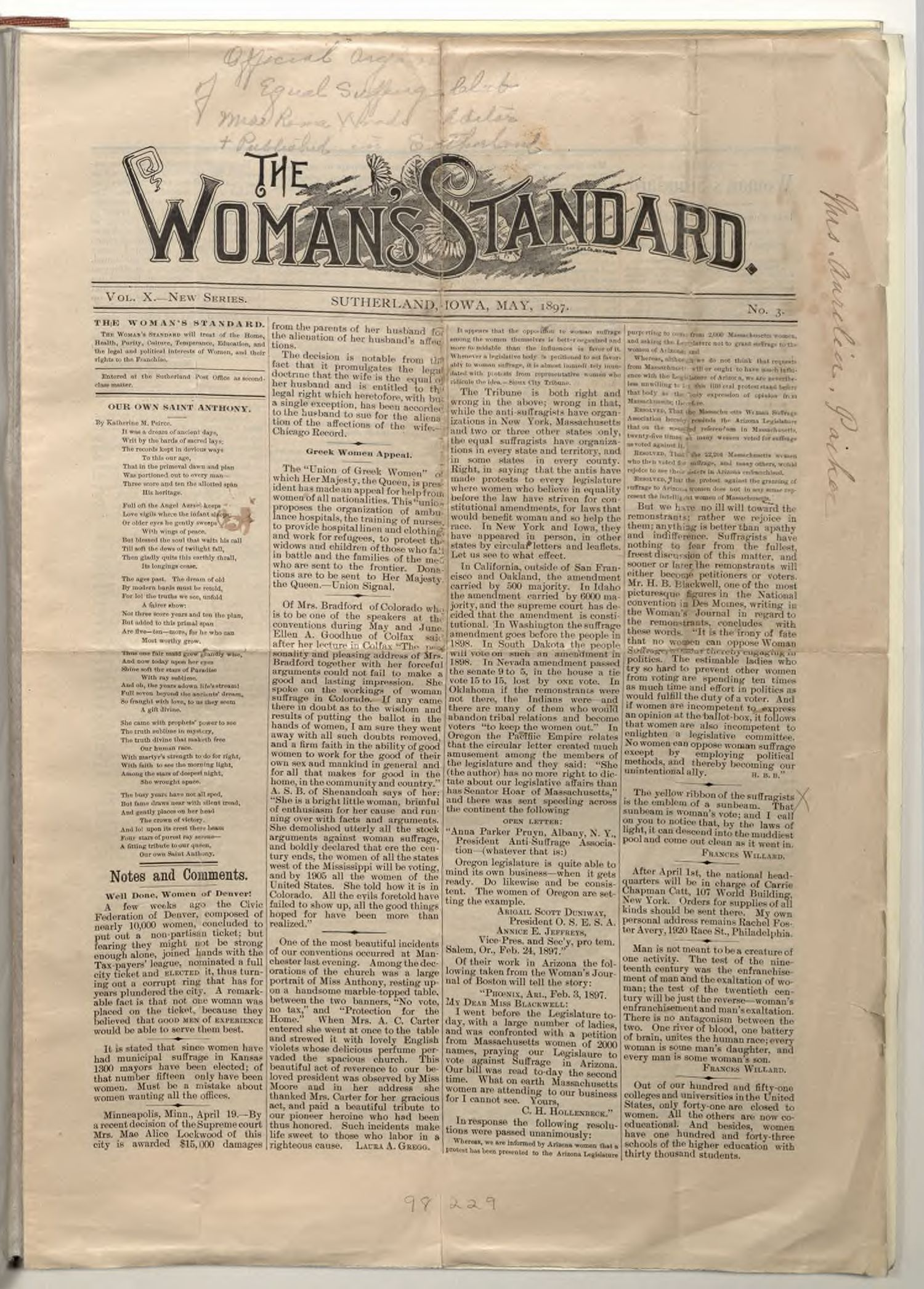
The Woman's Standard published in Sutherland, Iowa May 1897

=== 1890s ===
1890

- Governor William Larrabee advocates for partial women's suffrage at the state General Assembly.
- December 4–5: The state suffrage convention is held in Des Moines.

1891

- November 7: The Iowa Equal Suffrage Association (IESA) is incorporated.
- December 3–4: The state suffrage convention is held in Ames.

1892

- A bill to allow women to vote for presidential electors is proposed but does not make it out of Committee.
- September 22: The state suffrage convention is held in Des Moines.

1893

- November 9–10: The state suffrage convention is held in Webster City.

1894

- February: Two partial suffrage bills are introduced in the Iowa State House and Senate.
- March 22: The partial suffrage bill that combined municipal and school suffrage issues, called the Watkins Bill, is passed by that state House.
- April 13: Women who pay taxes gain partial suffrage and can vote on bond issues and for school issues.
- November 8–9: The state suffrage convention is held in Marshalltown.
- Women in Waterloo came together to vote and support the library tax for the city.

1895

- October 18–19: State suffrage convention is held in Des Moines.

1896

- Pauline Swalm speaks about the Woman Citizen at the Iowa State Fair.
- November 17–19: The state suffrage convention is held in Independence.

1897

- January: The National American Woman Suffrage Association (NAWSA) holds their annual convention in Des Moines.
- April 2–3: Anna Howard Shaw speaks in Jefferson on women's suffrage.

1898

- February 23: The Iowa Association Opposed to Woman Suffrage (IAOWS) is organized.

== 20th century ==
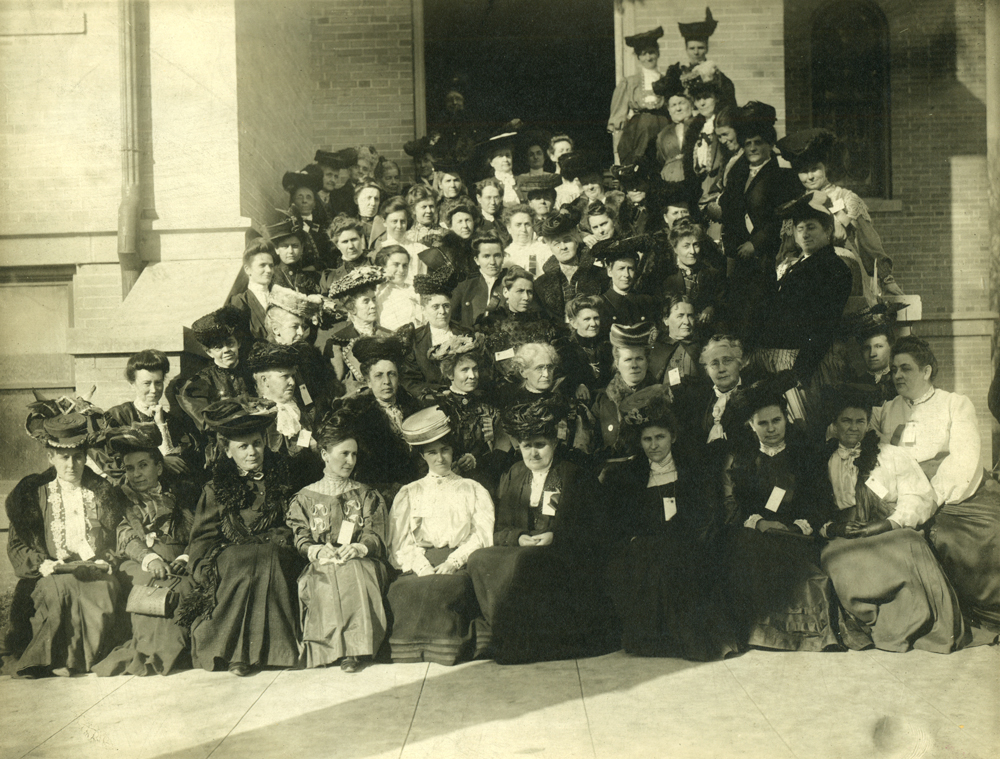
Equal Suffrage Convention attendees in Panora, Iowa, November 1905

=== 1900s ===
1900

- Petitions with more than 100,000 signatures for women's suffrage were sent to the state legislature.
- May: The Iowa Federation of Colored Women's Clubs (IFCWC) is organized and Helen Downey is the first president.

1901

- November: The state suffrage annual convention in Waterloo.

1902

- Women's suffrage legislation passes in the state Senate and fails in the House.
- October: The state suffrage convention is held in Des Moines.

1903

- October: Boone hosts the state suffrage convention.

1904

- October: The state suffrage convention is held in Sheldon.

1905

- November: The state suffrage convention is held in Panora.

1906

- September: The annual state suffrage convention is held in Ida Grove.

1907

- October: The state suffrage convention is held in Des Moines.

1908

- October: The state suffrage convention is held in Boone.
- October 29: A suffrage parade in Boone is organized by Rowena Edson Stevenson and Eleanor Gordon. Around 150 women marched and then heard a speech by Anna Howard Shaw.
- November: Women voters are not given ballots during the bond election in Des Moines.

=== 1910s ===
1910

- Around 79 men found the Iowa chapter of the Men's League for Woman Suffrage.

1911

- The Iowa Woman's Christian Temperance Union (WCTU) has publicly declared their support for women's suffrage.
- The Iowa Federation of Women's Clubs (IFWC) declares their support for suffrage during their convention in Sioux City.
- The Woman's Standard ceases publication.
- December 22: Mary Jane Coggeshall died and left $5,000 to the state suffrage groups and $10,000 to the national effort.

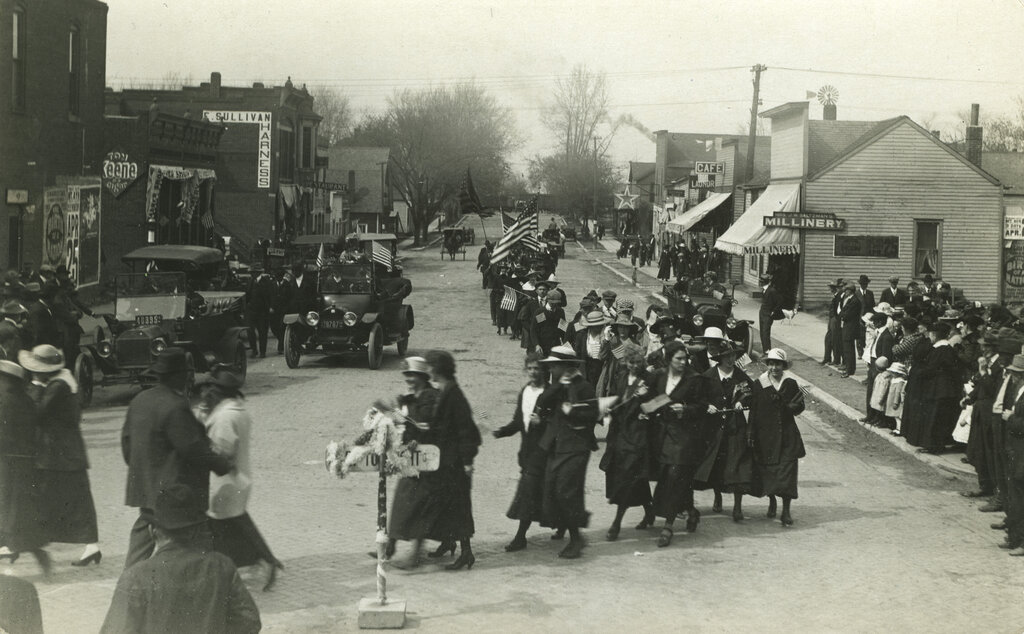
Suffrage parade in Mount Ayr, Iowa, in 1915

1912

- The Progressive, Prohibition, Republican, and Socialist parties in Iowa officially endorsed women's suffrage.
- During the Iowa State Fair, the City Council of Suffrage Clubs sponsored a showing of Votes for Women.
- July: An automobile tour is organized by suffragists who travel between Des Moines and Mitchellville, giving speeches.
- October: The state suffrage convention was held in Des Moines.

1913

- March 15: An equal suffrage bill is passed and signed by Governor George W. Clarke. The bill has to pass in the next legislative session in 1915 before it can go out to voters.
- September: Another automobile tour is organized by suffragists and travels through 30 towns.
- October: State suffrage convention is held in Boone.

1914

- March 29–31: Mississippi Valley Suffrage Conference is held in Des Moines.
- October: The state suffrage meeting is held in Des Moines.

1915

- October: State suffrage convention is held in Des Moines.

1916

- June 3: African American's march for women's suffrage in Buxton.
- June 5: The suffrage amendment is defeated.

1917

- State suffrage convention is held in Des Moines.

1918

- June: Suffrage school for educating women on the upcoming federal suffrage amendment is held at William Penn College in Oskaloosa.
- September: State suffrage convention meets in Cedar Rapids.

1919

- January: Governor William L. Harding recommends support for the federal suffrage amendment in the state legislature.
- April: Women's presidential suffrage bill passes.
- July 2: Iowa is the 10th state to ratify the Nineteenth Amendment.
- August: Sue M. Wilson Brown founds and leads the Des Moines League of Colored Women Voters.
- October 2: The IESA dissolves and becomes the Iowa League of Women Voters (LWV).
