= Gertrude von Petzold =

Petzold, Gertrude von (1876–1952), Unitarian minister and public lecturer

Reverend Gertrude von Petzold
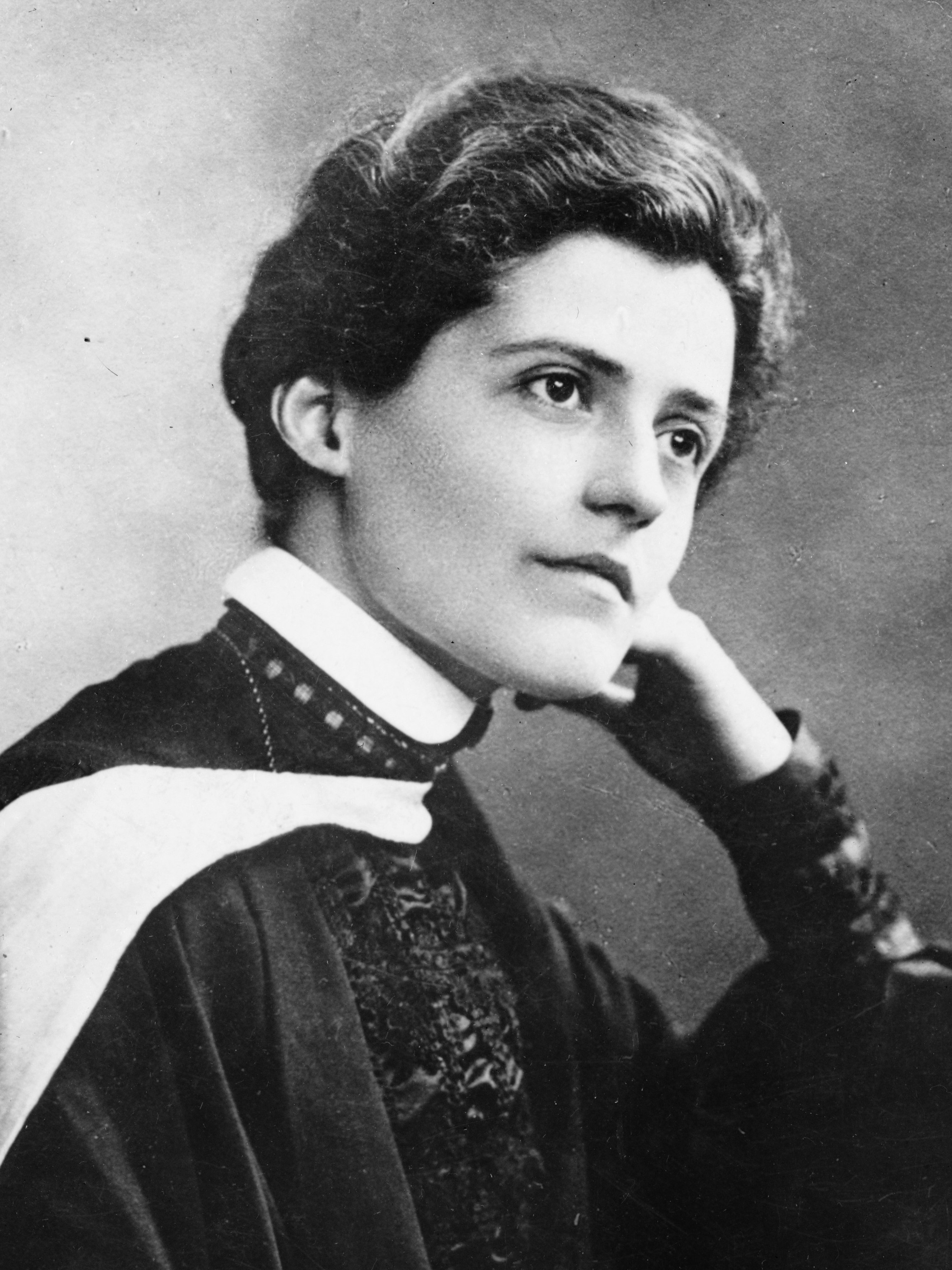
- Von Petzold in 1904
- Born: Gertrud von Petzold; January 9, 1876; Thorn, West Prussia, German Empire (now Toruń, Poland)
- Died: March 14, 1953 (aged 77); Bad Homburg, West Germany
- Education: University of Edinburgh (MA); Manchester College, Oxford; University of Birmingham (MA); University of Tübingen (PhD)
- Occupation: Minister · Lecturer

Gertrude von Petzold (9 January 1876 – 14 March 1952) was a German Unitarian minister and public lecturer. She was the first woman to be appointed for church ministry in England. Petzold was also the first woman in Germany who qualified for professorship in Germanics at the University of Kiel. She taught English at the University of Frankfurt.

== Early life and education ==
Petzold was born on 9 January 1876 in Thorn, West Prussia (now Toruń, Poland) as the daughter of Paul Von Petzold, an officer in the Prussian army. She grew up in the Lutheran faith and was thoroughly instructed in its catechism by her mother, Magdalene von Wedelstaedt. By the age of 18, she passed her teacher's exam in Stettin, Pomerania (now Szczecin, Poland) but felt inadequate and experienced "the burning desire to improve my intellectual culture". Although Germany began to open up to higher education, she grew impatient of the limited opportunities afforded to women and instead saw Britain as "land of freedom" where she decided to pursue her higher education.

Petzold also grew increasingly critical to the literal interpretation of Lutheranism and started to occupy herself with theological books. She then decided to devote herself entirely to the study of theology and make it her life vocation. She wrote:

Ever since I had left the normal school I had begun to doubt the traditional forms of Christianity as the catechism had taught them to us. I had especially arrived at the conclusion that many of the Biblical stories could not possibly be understood literally, as was required of us at the school. What then was true in the Bible? What was true in Christianity? What could on still believe of the so-called plan of salvation, and the essential Christian doctrines which had been so impressed upon us at the school?

She first made her way to the University of St Andrews, where she studied between 1895 and 1897, and then the University of Edinburgh where graduated with a Master of Arts in 1901. The same year, she entered a three-year theological course at Manchester College, Oxford, where she became the first woman to train for church ministry in England.

== Career ==
=== Ministry in Leicester ===
In order to pursue her vocation, Petzold needed a church sufficiently liberal to accept a woman as minister. This role was fulfilled by the Unitarian Narborough Road Free Christian Church in Leicester which decided to rise above the convention and invited her unanimously – in competition with several male candidates – to the pulpit. Her induction took place on 29 September 1904, making her the first woman minister in England.

In 1907, Petzold was the only European woman delegate to attend the Fourth International Congress of Religious Liberals in Boston.

=== Experience in America ===
Petzold left Leicester and arrived in Boston, Massachusetts in 1908. Later she joined Mary Safford in missionary work in Iowa, becoming active in the Iowa Sisterhood within the Unitarian Church. In Des Moines, she served as an interim pastor in the absence of Mary Safford, fulfilling that minister's role as chaplain to the Iowa General Assembly. She also served sessions at the All Souls Church in Chicago, Illinois.

=== Return to Germany ===
Shortly after the start of the First World War in August 1914, Petzold had to return to Germany since her application to obtain British citizenship had lapsed and emigration to the USA was not possible. She was interned for a period after her return to Germany.

Petzold then accepted a temporary post at an American Church in Berlin and later started a PhD in Theology and Germanics at the University of Tübingen. In 1917, she handed in her dissertation to Otto Behaghel with the title Images of the Saviour in the German Novel of the Present time.

At the end of the First World War, Petzold joined the Social Democratic Party of Germany and became a city councillor in Königsberg, West Prussia (now Kaliningrad, Russia). She was socially active in the Monistenbund (Union of monists, founded in Jena in 1906 by the natural scientist Ernst Haeckel) and later as a member of the National Socialist People's Welfare.

In 1941, she qualified through the writing of a habilitation for the possibility of gaining a professorship at the University of Kiel in Germanics – being the first woman to achieve this in Germany. However, she never received the call to professorship for several reasons: At the age of 65 she was considered too old and did not have close ties to the Nazi Party which made it impossible to take a professorship for her. The Second World War might have also led to little funding being available to the humanities, as all resources were allocated in the war.

== Death ==
Petzold survived the war and died on 14 March 1952 in Bad Homburg, West Germany.

== Publications ==
- Heilandsbilder im deutschen Roman der Gegenwart (Saviour Figures in Modern German Literature) (1917)
- The Influence of Nietzsche on the Intellectual and Spiritual Development of John Davidson (1928)
- Nietzsche in English and American Estimation up to 1918 (1929)
- Harriet Martineau – Her Moral and Religious Attitudes (1941)

== See also ==
- Unitarianism
