= Iowa Sisterhood =

The Iowa Sisterhood was a group of women ministers who organized eighteen Unitarian societies in several Midwestern states in the late 19th century and early 20th century.

Some of the first women ordained in the United States were Universalist or Unitarian; however, the path for women ministers was not easy. Of those early women who achieved ordination, few were allowed to serve in full-time ministries. Others were relegated to small, struggling parishes or assistant positions alongside their clergy husbands. Despite the lack of encouragement, at the end of the 19th century a group of women claimed their role as ordained ministers. Following the Women's Ministerial Conference organized by Julia Ward Howe in 1875, 21 Unitarian women founded the Iowa Sisterhood to serve churches throughout the Great Plains.

Between 1880 and 1930, these women changed the course of Unitarianism. The Iowa Sisterhood was led primarily by Mary Augusta Safford. Other members included Eleanor Gordon, Florence Buck, Mary Collson, Eliza Tupper Wilkes, Mila Tupper Maynard, Adele Fuchs, Martha Chapman Aitken, Mary Leggett Cooke, Caroline Julia Bartlett Crane, Rowena Morse Mann, Amelia Murdoch Wing, Mary Graves, Marie Jenney Howe, Ida Hultin, Marion Murdoch, Anna Jane Norris, Margaret Titus Olmstead, Elizabeth Padgham, Gertrude von Petzold, Helen Wilson, Celia Parker Woolley, and Helen Grace Putnam.

Few male scholars from the seminaries of the East were attracted to the life [of the Plains states]. But if the Plains were beyond the recognition of an Eastern religious hierarchy, they were also remote from that hierarchy's rules and control. It was a place where women were accepted for their willingness to step in and serve, for their tenacity in the face of hardship, and for their ministry.

One reason for the success of the Iowa Sisterhood was the non-academic, pastoral approach these women brought to their churches. They sought to make their churches extensions of the domestic hearth, thereby expanding the traditional role of women beyond the home and into the church. The Sisterhood brought family matters into the church ... seven days a week, with social events and classes on domestic arts.

Although Jenkin Lloyd Jones, leader of the Unitarian Church's Western Conference, was a staunch ally of the Iowa Sisterhood, the success of these women and their churches did not translate into wider denominational acceptance. The women were seen as an embarrassment among the [Unitarian] clergy back in Boston. By the turn of the 20th century, society in general experienced a reassertion of male authority. Unitarianism's leaders began a concerted return to a more manly ministry in order to revitalize the denomination. The move of rural populations to the cities further undermined the Sisterhood's efforts and congregations.

Most of the women ministers were rushed into retirement. Others left to pursue social justice work in peace, suffrage, and social work movements. They remained vocal about the rights of women and the place of church in society. It was not a large movement, nor was it long-lasting. The Iowa Sisterhood did not radically alter the possibilities for women in Unitarian ministry. But ... it offered an example of women called to minister and men called to support their work.
