= Vivian Smith (suffragist) =

American suffragist (1891–1961)

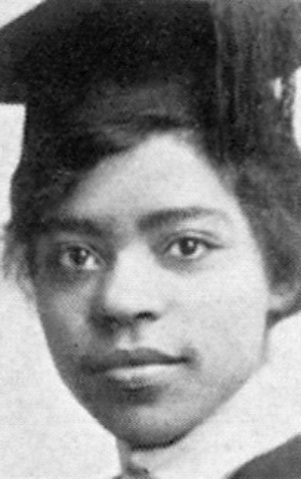
- Smith at graduation, 1916
- Born: October 23, 1891; Fulton, Kentucky, U.S.
- Died: October 28, 1961 (aged 70); Iowa City, Iowa, U.S.
- Other names: Vivian Watts
- Occupations: Teacher, civil rights leader, women's suffragist

Vivian Beatrice Watts (née Smith; October 23, 1891 – October 28, 1961) was an American teacher, civil rights activist, and women's suffragist. She was the first African American student to graduate with a bachelor's degree in English from Iowa State Teachers College, which is now known as the University of Northern Iowa. Smith was included in a 2021 traveling exhibit honoring Iowa African American women suffragists.

== Personal life ==
Smith was born on October 23, 1891, in Fulton, Kentucky, to Clemmie and Samuel Smith. She moved with her family to Clinton, Iowa, where her parents worked as hotel cooks. Shortly after the Illinois Central shopmen's strike of 1911, the family moved to Waterloo, Iowa, where Smith attended school. Smith graduated from Iowa State Teachers College, which is now known as the University of Northern Iowa, in Cedar Falls, Iowa, in 1916, as the first black student to graduate with a bachelor's degree in English. She was one of the first black students to graduate from there, and Smith's cousin, Murda Beason, graduated from the same university six months prior. Smith was a violinist and singer, often performing at Iowa Federation of Colored Women's Clubs meetings. She was a member of the African Methodist Episcopal Church. She married LeRoy Watts on October 23, 1925, in Black Hawk County, Iowa. She died on October 28, 1961, in Iowa City, Iowa.

== Career ==
Smith tried to find work as a teacher, but she was unable to find employment due to her race; Waterloo did not hire African American teachers until 1952. After being hired as a house cleaner, Smith later created the Waterloo Suffragette Council, which focused on women's rights. She was part of the Iowa Federation of Colored Women's Clubs as an officer and chairwoman of suffrage. After being hired as a teacher, she taught in Kamrar and Blairsburg in Iowa as well as in Illinois.

Smith was included in a 2021 traveling museum exhibit titled "Toward a Universal Suffrage: African American Women in Iowa and the Vote for All". The exhibit was created by the Iowa Department of Human Rights' Office on the Status of Women, the Central Iowa Community Museum, and the Carrie Chapman Catt Center for Women and Politics at Iowa State University.
