= Mary Leggett Cooke =

Rev. Mary Leggett Cooke
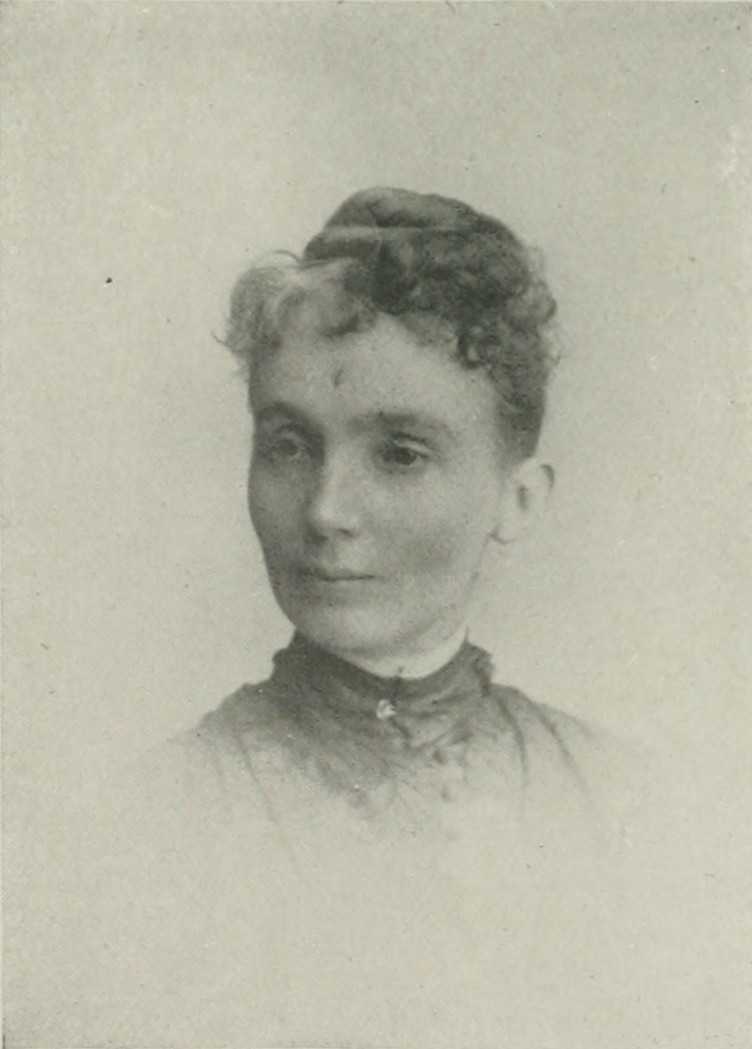
- Portrait photo from A Woman of the Century

Personal life
- Born: Mary Lydia Leggett; April 23, 1852 Cayuga County, New York
- Died: August 17, 1938 (aged 86) Brookline, Massachusetts, U.S.
- Spouse: Rev. George Willis Cooke (m. 1923; died 1923)
- Parent: Rev. William Leggett (father)
- Education: Harvard Divinity School
- Known for: Member of the Iowa Sisterhood

Religious life
- Denomination: Unitarian
- Profession: Minister
- Ordination: 1887

Mary Leggett Cooke (1852–1938) was an American Unitarian minister. She was a member of the Iowa Sisterhood, a group of women ministers who organized eighteen Unitarian societies in several Midwestern states in the late 19th century and early 20th century.

== Early life and education ==
Mary Lydia Leggett was born in Cayuga County, New York, (Note: Records differ on whether Cooke was born in Sempronius, Cayuga County, New York or Moravia, Cayuga County, New York.) April 23, 1852. She was the daughter of Rev. William Leggett and Frelove Frost Leggett. From earliest childhood, she was a worshipper of the religion of nature.

She was educated at Monticello Seminary in Godfrey, Illinois, and was the first woman to graduate from Harvard Divinity School. She continued her studies while traveling to Egypt, Greece, and Italy.

== Career ==
Cooke was ordained to the Unitarian ministry in 1887, in Kansas City, Missouri. Rev. Charles Gordon Ames of Philadelphia preached her ordination sermon.

She built and dedicated a church in Beatrice, Nebraska, of which she was minister until 1891, when she went to Boston, Massachusetts, and became minister of a seaboard parish 36 miles (58 km) from that city. Her church in Green Harbor, Massachusetts, was founded by the granddaughter of Daniel Webster, whose summer home was in that hamlet. Leggett's study contained the office table on which Webster penned his speeches. In that state, she also served at Dighton. After that, she was at Fort Collins, Colorado, Wolfeboro, New Hampshire, and Revere, Massachusetts.

Cooke was also affiliated with the social settlements movement and women's suffrage.

== Personal life ==
On April 23, 1923, she married Rev. George Willis Cooke, who died a week after their wedding, at her home in Revere, Massachusetts.

Mary Leggett Cooke died in Brookline, Massachusetts, on August 17, 1938.
