= James Wilson (zoologist) =

Scottish zoologist (1795–1856)

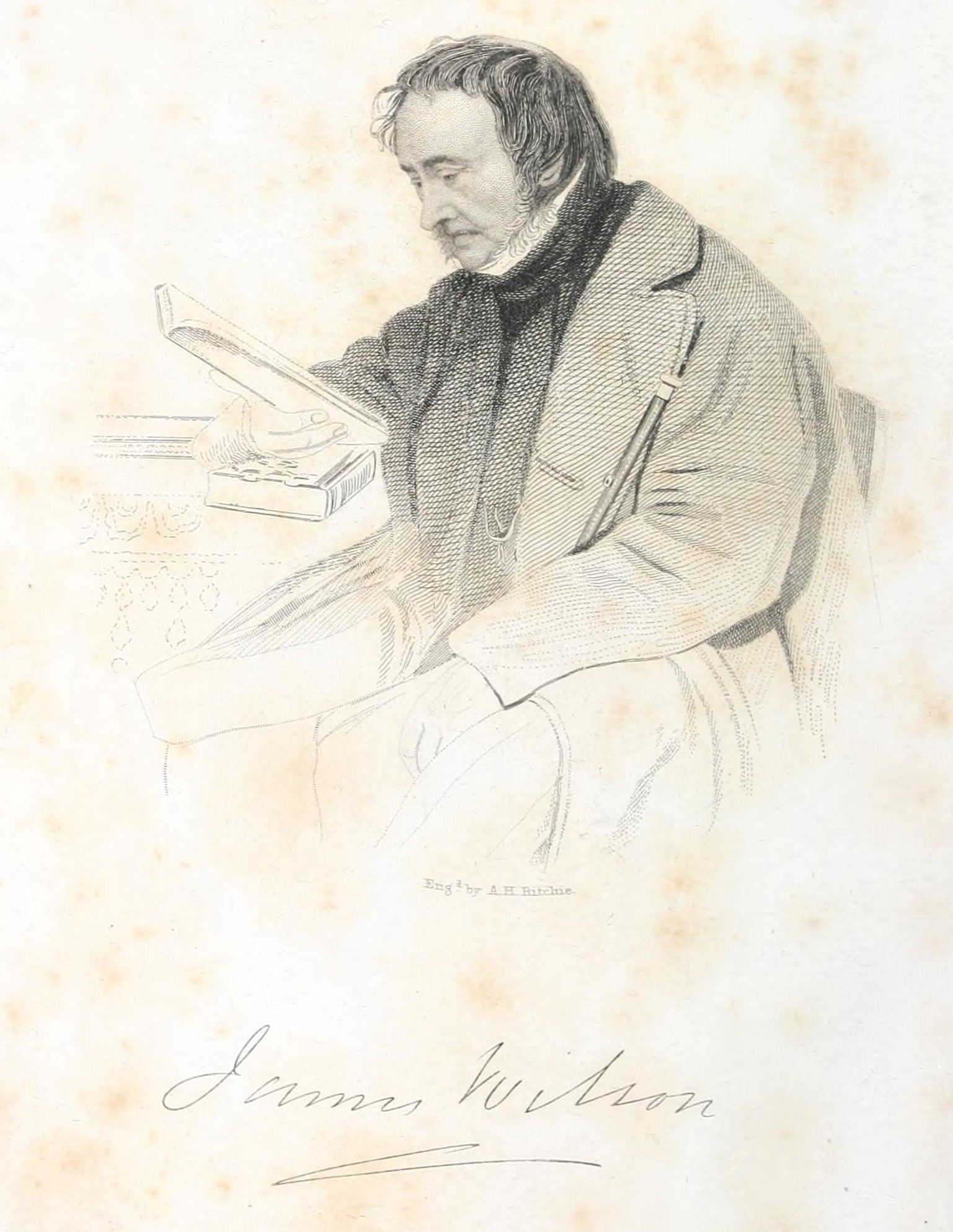
- Portrait from his 1859 biography
- Born: 20 November 1795; Paisley, Scotland
- Died: 18 May 1856 (aged 60); Edinburgh, Scotland

James Wilson of Woodville FRSE (20 November 1795 – 18 May 1856) was a 19th-century Scottish zoologist.

== Life ==
Wilson was born at Paisley on 20 November 1795, the youngest son of Margaret Sym and John Wilson (d. 1796), a gauze manufacturer. His father died during his first year, after which the family moved to Edinburgh, where he was educated. In 1811, he began to study for the law at the University of Edinburgh.

Wilson joined the Wernerian Society when we was 17 years old.

In 1816, Wilson visited the Netherlands, Germany, Switzerland, and Paris. He later returned to Paris to purchase Louis Dufresne's collection of birds for the museum of the University of Edinburgh; and helped to arrange them. In 1819, he visited Sweden, soon after which symptoms of lung disease appeared, and he resided in Italy during 1820–1821. In 1824, he married Isabella Keith. They lived at Woodburn, Dalkeith near Edinburgh, where he wrote and worked on scientific pursuits. When his wife died in 1837, he took a winter residence in George Square, Edinburgh. He purchased Woodville in south Edinburgh in 1838.

In 1827, he was elected a Fellow of the Royal Society of Edinburgh, his proposer being Robert Jameson. From 1850 until his death he was Curator for the Society.

In 1841, at the request of the Fisheries Board, he made a series of excursions around the coast of Scotland with Sir Thomas Dick Lauder, to study the natural history of herring, Other trips followed at intervals between 1843 and 1850, and fishing excursions inland. In 1854, he was offered but declined the chair of natural history at the University of Edinburgh. The chair had become available on the death of its incumbent, Edward Forbes.

He died at Woodville House on Canaan Lane in Morningside, Edinburgh on 18 May 1856. He is buried in Dean Cemetery in west Edinburgh. The grave lies in the small central south section facing onto the main central path. It stands immediately in front of the more distinctive grave of his brother John Wilson.

== Family ==
In 1824, he married Isabella Keith (d.1837). Their daughter, Marianne (Marion) Rae Wilson married James Alexander Russell.

John Wilson who wrote as "Christopher North" was his eldest brother; Matthew Leishman was his cousin, and lived nearby; Henrietta Wilson the writer was his niece, daughter of his brother Andrew.

His niece, Henrietta Margaret Sym Wilson (1810–1863) came to live with him at Woodville, after her parents died. She was a novelist of some note. She is buried with him in Dean Cemetery.

== Evolution ==
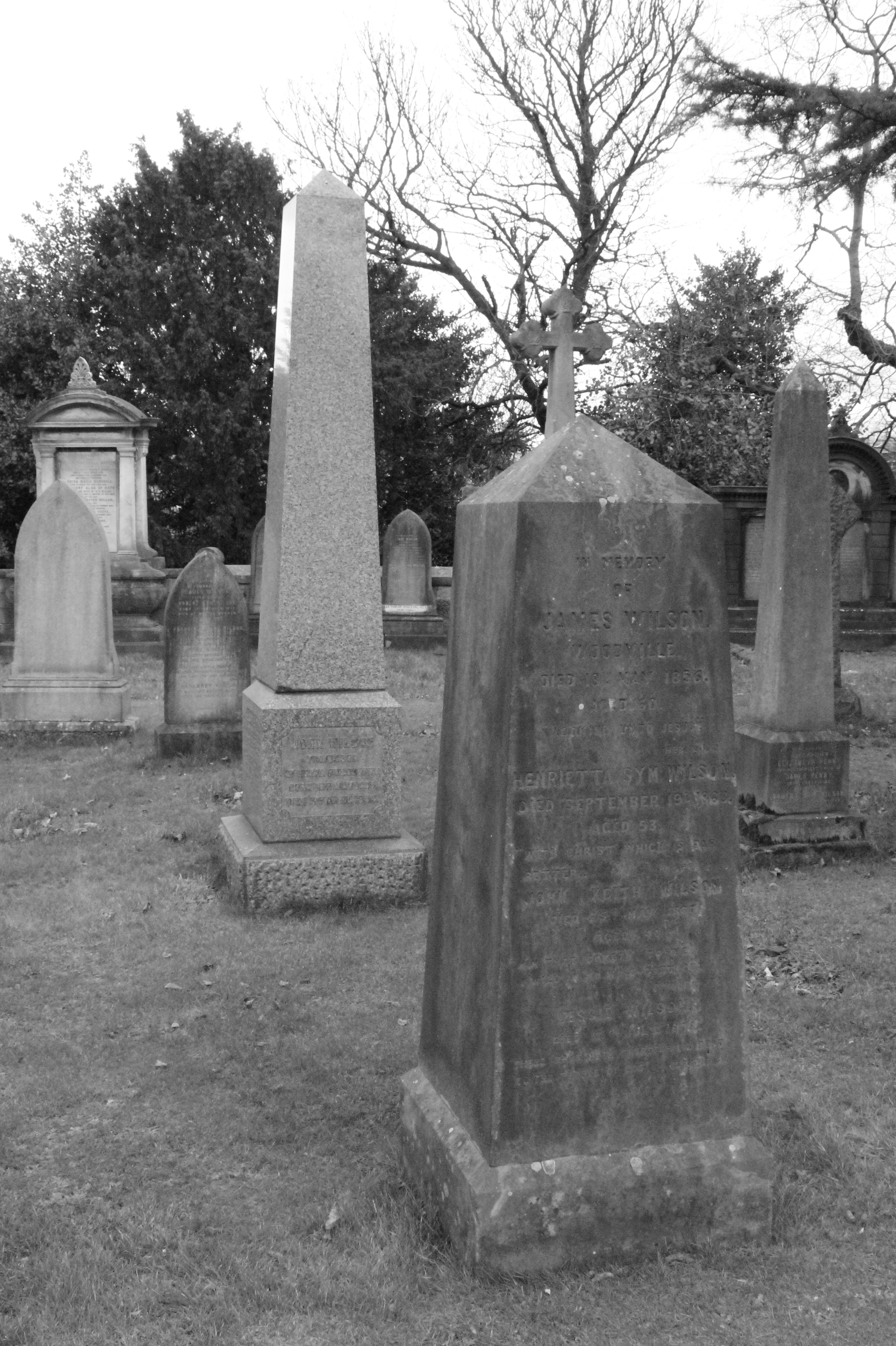
The grave of James Wilson, Dean Cemetery

Wilson was one of the first to have used the term "evolution" in the context of biological speciation. In 1830, he used this term in a paper on the history of goat and sheep, he wrote:

Whatever dreams the mystical imaginings of some modern philosophers may have given rise to regarding the origin of species, and the gradual evolution of one form of animal life as connected with or consequent upon another, it is not a bad rule, though a tolerably old fashioned one, to believe that in the origin of species nothing was left entirely to such casual intercourses, but rather that every thing was not only divinely planned, but directly performed, by the same simple though Omnipotent fiat which gathered together the waters under the heaven, and made the dry land appear, with all the beautiful, infinitely varied, and most harmoniously adapted inhabitants of either element.

Wilson's use of the term predated Charles Lyell in 1832. Wilson had rejected the evolution of species for creationism.

== Works ==
He was author of:

- Illustrations of Zoology, Edinburgh, 1826, 9 pts.
- Entomologia Edinensis, written with James Duncan, Edinburgh, 1834.
- Treatise on Insects, Edinburgh, 1835.
- Introduction to the Natural History of Quadrupeds and Whales, Edinburgh, 1838.
- Introduction to the Natural History of Fishes, Edinburgh, 1838.
- Introduction to the Natural History of Birds, Edinburgh, 1839.
- The Rod and Gun, Edinburgh, 1840; new edition, 1844.
- A Voyage round the Coasts of Scotland, Edinburgh, 1842, 2 vols.
- Illustrations of Scripture. By an Animal Painter, with Notes by a Naturalist [signed ‘J. W.’], Edinburgh (1855).

For the Edinburgh Cabinet Library he wrote the zoology of India, China, Africa, and the northern regions of North America; and contributed the greater part of the natural history and a life of Professor Forbes to the seventh edition of the Encyclopædia Britannica. He published articles in the Quarterly Magazine, Blackwood's Magazine, and other periodicals.
