= George Willis Cooke =

Unitarian minister, writer, editor and lecturer

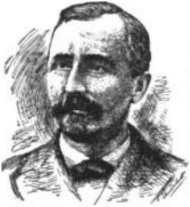
- Born: April 23, 1848; Comstock, Michigan
- Died: April 30, 1923 (aged 75); Revere, Massachusetts
- Education: Meadville Theological School
- Occupations: Minister, writer, editor and lecturer
- Known for: Unitarian minister
- Notable work: Unitarianism in America (1902)
- Spouses: Lucy Nash; Mary Lydia Leggett
- Children: Florence; Marian

George Willis Cooke (April 23, 1848 – April 30, 1923) was a Unitarian minister, writer, editor and lecturer. He is best known for Unitarianism in America, his history of that movement in the 19th century, and for his work on Transcendentalist writers and publications.

== Biography ==
George Willis Cooke was born in Comstock, Michigan on April 23, 1848.

In 1872 Cooke was ordained at Meadville Theological School. While serving the parish ministry he also wrote articles, worked as an editor for papers and journals, and published work relating to Unitarianism and transcendentalist authors like Ralph Waldo Emerson. Between 1900 and 1922 he ceased his ministry work to focus on that time he gave lectures at the Rand School of Social Science and the Boston School of Social Science.

He died in Revere, Massachusetts on April 30, 1923.

== Works ==
- Cooke, George Willis (1881). Ralph Waldo Emerson: His Life, Writings, and Philosophy (2 ed.). Boston: James R. Osgood. Online publication
- Cooke, George Willis (1883). George Eliot: A Critical Study of Her Life, Writings, and Philosophy (2 ed.). Boston: James R. Osgood.
- Cooke, George Willis (1887). A History of the Clapboard Trees or Third Parish, Dedham, Mass., Now the Unitarian Parish, West Dedham, 1736-1886. Boston: George H. Ellis.
- Cooke, George Willis (1891). A Guide-Book to the Poetic and Dramatic works of Robert Browning. Boston: Houghton, Mifflin.
- Cooke, George Willis (1893). The Spiritual Life: Studies of Devotion and Worship. Boston: George H. Ellis.
- Cooke, George Willis (1898). John Sullivan Dwight, Brook-farmer, editor, and critic of music: a biography. Boston: Small, Maynard. hdl:2027/hvd.hw2goe.
- Cooke, George Willis (1902). Unitarianism in America: a history of its origin and development. Boston: American Unitarian Association. Online publication
- Cooke, George Willis (1902). An Historical and Biographical Introduction to Accompany the Dial. Boston: Small, Maynard.
- Cooke, George Willis (1906). A Bibliography of James Russell Lowell. Boston: Houghton, Mifflin.
- Cooke, George Willis (1908). A Bibliography of Ralph Waldo Emerson. Boston: Houghton, Mifflin.
- Cooke, George Willis (1920). The Social Evolution of Religion. Boston: Stratford.
- Cooke, George Willis (1911). "Unitarianism" . In Chisholm, Hugh (ed.). Encyclopædia Britannica (11th ed.). Cambridge University Press.

== Literature ==
- Sunderland, Jabez T. (June 14, 1923). "George Willis Cooke: An Appreciation". Unity.

== See also ==
- History of Unitarianism
