= Frances Woods =

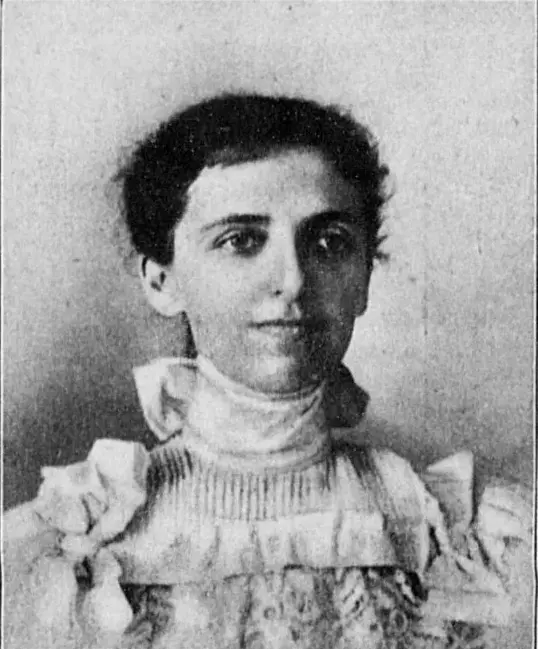
Frances Woods in 1899.

Frances Jane Woods (December 2, 1864 - October 7, 1959) was an American physician and suffragist. She worked for the National American Woman Suffrage Association (NAWSA) and other women's suffrage organizations across several states.

== Biography ==
Woods was born on December 2, 1864 and was raised in Nebraska City, Nebraska. Woods attended the Woman's Medical College of Pennsylvania where she graduated at the top of her class in May of 1894. She was an intern at the Memorial Hospital in Worcester and the New England Hospital for Women and Children. Afterwards, she worked at a boarding school, St. Helen’s Hall, as a nurse and resident physician. She enlisted as a Red Cross volunteer during the Spanish–American War and was sent to the Philippines, along with Anita Newcomb McGee, in August 1898. Woods and other women medical volunteers worked to be seen as equals and given work assignments. Eventually, was placed in charge of a ward in the First Reserve Hospital in Manila. Upon her return to the United States in the summer of 1899, she visited home and then embarked on a speaking tour about her wartime experiences.

Woods was considered a talented speaker and gained considerable experience organizing for women's suffrage in several states. Wood began to work as a national suffrage organizer for the National American Woman Suffrage Association (NAWSA) in 1901. Woods organized suffragists in Oregon in 1898. She was living in Des Moines, Iowa in 1900 and took part in the state's woman's suffrage campaign alongside Mary Garrett Hay. Woods became the Iowa state organizer for the Iowa Equal Suffrage Association. Later, she campaigned in other states, including Arkansas, Kansas and Ohio in 1901, Arizona in 1902, Kentucky in 1901 and 1904, and Oklahoma in 1905, In Oklahoma, Woods and Laura Gregg organized in "Indian Territory," in particular allying with Robert L. Owen of the Cherokee Nation. Due to their influence, the territorial suffrage association grew by 31 percent.

Woods resigned from national organizing work in 1908. She spent most of the rest of her life in Tucson, Arizona.

Woods died in a rest home in Tucson on October 7, 1959.
