= Elizabeth Bunnell Read =

American journalist and suffragist (1834–1909)

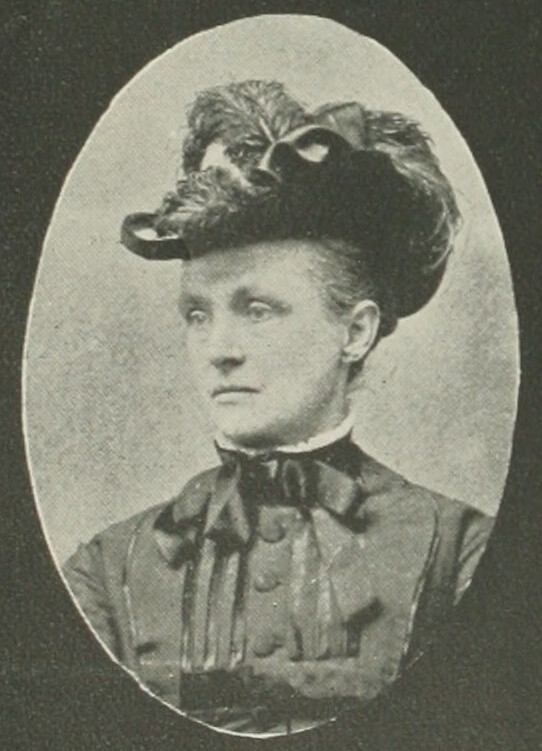
- Portrait photo from A Woman of the Century
- Born: Elizabeth Currence Bunnell; December 24, 1834; DeWitt, New York, U.S.
- Died: May 22, 1909 (aged 74); Fayetteville, Arkansas, U.S.
- Resting place: Riverview Cemetery, Algona, Iowa
- Other names: Lizzie B. Read
- Occupations: journalist; suffragist
- Known for: President, Iowa Woman's Suffrage Society
- Notable work: The Mayflower, the only suffrage paper published during the American Civil War
- Spouse: Samuel George Alexander Read (m. 1863; died 1893)

Elizabeth Bunnell Read (pen name, Lizzie B. Read; 1832–1909) was an American journalist and woman suffragist. Between 1861 and 1865, in Indiana, Read published The Mayflower, the only suffrage paper published during the American Civil War. She served as President of the Iowa Woman's Suffrage Society.

== Early life ==
Elizabeth Currence Bunnell was born on a farm in Dewitt township, near Syracuse, New York, on December 24, 1834, the fifth child in a family of four boys and five girls. Her father, Edmund Harger Bunnell, was born in Connecticut, the son of Nathan Bunnell and Currence Twitchell, his wife. Her mother was Betsey Ann Ashley, daughter of Dr. John Ashley, of Catskill, New York, and his wife Elizabeth Johnstone, of the Johnstones of colonial era. Her paternal grandfather was a soldier of the War of 1812, and his father participated in the American Revolutionary War. One of her brothers, Nathan Bunnell, a soldier in the Union Army died in 1862 during the civil war. When Elizabeth was fourteen years old, her parents removed from New York to Indiana, where, within six weeks after their arrival, her mother died. Business ventures proved unfortunate, and the family circle was soon broken.

== Career ==
Before she was 16, Miss Bunnell began to teach school.

She began writing for the press when about 20, and continued as a contributor to several different journals. Having an opportunity to learn the printing business, she did so, and found the occupation pleasant, though it required a lot of effort. She served an apprenticeship of two years, and then accepted the position of foreman of a weekly paper and job office in Peru, Indiana, filling the post for four years.

At the end of that time, in January 1861, she began publishing a semi-monthly journal called The Mayflower, devoted to literature, temperance and equal rights. That paper had a subscription list reaching into all the U.S. States and Territories.

On March 4, 1863, she married Dr. Samuel George Alexander Read (1814–1893). In 1865, the couple removed to Algona, Iowa. There she published 37 issues of a weekly county paper, The Upper Des Moines, representing the interests of the upper Des Moines valley, which at that time had no other newspaper.

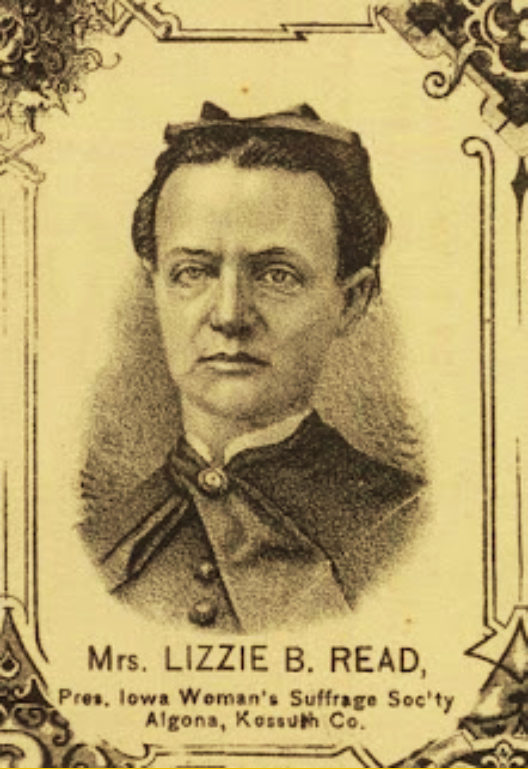
Lizzie B. Read, President, Iowa Woman's Suffrage Society, Algona, Iowa (1875 publication)

A series of articles in the Northwestern Christian Advocate in 1872, on the status of women in the Methodist Episcopal Church (MEC), led to their more just recognition in subsequent episcopal addresses.

By 1893, with Carrie Chapman Catt and Evelyn M. Russell, Read served as co-editor of the Woman's Standard, of Des Moines, Iowa, a monthly newspaper produced by the Iowa Woman Suffrage Association devoted to equal rights, temperance and literature. She was vice-president of the Indiana State Woman Suffrage Society, while residing there, and later served as president of the Iowa Woman's Suffrage Society. In May 1897, from Elkins, Arkansas, Read wrote a letter to the suffragists who gathered in Algona, Iowa giving her support for a campaign to bring the woman's suffrage to the State.

Read was deeply interested in all social and moral problems. The unfortunate and criminal classes enlisted her sympathy and attention. She was one of the original members and promoters of the Woman's Congress. She lectured occasionally on temperance, education and suffrage. She was generally known in literature as Mrs. Lizzie B. Read.

In church membership, Read was Methodist. In 1899, Read donated US$500 to the newly built Methodist Episcopal Church in Algona, noting that one of the big windows was to be made into a memorial for her husband. He was the first president of the trustees of the first church, and for over a year, all the Methodist meetings were held in their home. The Methodist church and The Upper Des Moines newspaper were both housed at their home at the same time.

== Personal life ==
In June 1885, Read went to Salt Lake City, Utah to recuperate from over-work.

For some years before the turn of the century, she made her home in the Ozarks of Arkansas. Elizabeth Bunnell Read died in Fayetteville, Arkansas, May 22, 1909, and is interred in Riverview Cemetery in Algona, Iowa.

A note in the May 26, 1909 edition of the Upper Des Moines Republican stated:—

"She was an ardent advocate of the ballot for woman at a time when the notion was much more unpopular than it is now. While not apparently a woman of a wide range of sympathies, she was a woman of intellectual vigor and was fearless and aggressive."

== Awards and honors ==
- Iowa State Honor Roll of the National League of Women Voters
- 2022, "Votes For Women" historical marker erected in Peru, Indiana, honoring Lizzie Bunnell
