= Jane Amy McKinney =

American educator and philanthropist

Jane Amy McKinney (October 25, 1832 - 1905) was an American educator and philanthropist. She was actively engaged in temperance work and in the advocacy of women's suffrage.

== Early life ==
Jane Amy was born in Vermont, on October 25, 1832. From both father and mother, she inherited marked characteristics. They were devoutly religious and possessed a robust humanitarianism, which bore fruit while they lived and left its impress on their daughters. The mother's family was devoted to literature and scientific investigation. One of her brothers was the first man to construct a galvanic battery to control electricity, before Morse took up the invention. For years the effort of his inventive genius was unknown, at the end of the 19th century it was chronicled in electrical literature.

The family moved to northern Ohio in 1835, and settled in Mentor, Ohio.

Amy was educated in the Western Reserve Seminary and in Oberlin College, Ohio.

== Career ==
Since the age of fifteen Jane Amy McKinney was engaged in educational and philanthropic work almost continuously. In Iowa she was actively engaged in temperance work and in the advocacy of woman suffrage. She served a term of four years by election of the legislature as trustee of the hospital for the insane in Independence, Iowa. She was president of the Cook County Equal Suffrage Association. Susan B. Anthony helped McKinney to organize the Winnesheik County Woman Suffrage Association in 1875. McKinney was a skilled legislative lobbyist.

She did kindergarten work and was supervisor of the Chicago Kindergarten Training School.

== Personal life ==
Jane Amy married James P. McKinney (1827–1903) in 1856 and went with her husband to Decorah, Iowa, where her home was until 1888 when she moved to Chicago, Illinois. They had one daughter, Mabel McKinney Smith (1867–1968).

She died in 1905 and is buried at Phelps Cemetery, Decorah, Iowa.
