= Mary Collson =

American activist, minister, and Christian Scientist

Mary Edith Collson (1870–1952) was an American feminist activist, Unitarian Universalist minister, and practitioner in The First Church of Christ, Scientist.

== Biography ==
Born near Humboldt, Iowa, into a poor family of rationalists, Collson spent four years as a teacher prior to earning her degree in economics from the University of Iowa. She went on to the Meadville Lombard Theological School in Chicago, where she was supported in her studies by Marian Murdock, Eleanor Gordon, and Mary Safford. Upon graduation, she was encouraged to take a position with the Unitarian church in Ida Grove, Iowa. She connected especially with the theology of the social gospel, and for a time she worked as a juvenile court parole officer at Hull House. She later went to Boston, working for the National Women's Trade Union League as a union organizer and studying to practice Christian Science, becoming a practitioner in 1904. Moving to Evansville, Indiana, where she was the First Reader, she thrived in the position before leaving the faith in 1914. She moved to New York City to organize for the Women's Political Union and the Socialist Party's women's committee marches. Returning to Christian Science, she once again served as a practitioner until 1928; she left the faith again in 1932. At her death she left an unpublished autobiography detailing her relationship with Christian Science; this was later used as the basis for a biography by Cynthia Grant Tucker, Healer in Harm's Way, released in 1995; Tucker had previously published a monograph on her life in 1984, and wrote about her again in Prophetic sisterhood: liberal women ministers of the frontier, 1880-1930, published in 2000.
