= Henrietta Wilson =

Scottish botanist and writer (1810–1863)

- Born: 30 September 1810; Scotland
- Died: 19 September 1863 (aged 52)
- Occupations: Botanist and writer
- Relatives: James Wilson (uncle)

Henrietta Margaret Sym Wilson (30 September 1810–19 September 1863) was a Scottish botanist and writer in the nineteenth century.

Henrietta Margaret Sym Wilson was born Henrietta Margaret Lyon Wilson on 30 September 1810 in Scotland. Her father, Andrew Wilson, was the brother of zoologist James Wilson. After Henrietta's mother died, she was taken in by her grandmother Margaret Sym Wilson.

By 1833, Henrietta Wilson had moved into her uncle James' house near Edinburgh to care for his invalid wife. After her uncle's wife died in 1837, Henrietta took over running his house and family.

Whilst looking after her uncle's family, Wilson wrote several books. Little Things was published anonymously in 1851 and was also published in German. Things to be Thought of was published anonymously in 1853. Homely hints from the Fireside was initially published anonymously in 1858 or 1859, and then under her name in 1860.

Wilson also campaigned for qualified nurses to help poorer families if the mother fell sick. She asked that the proceeds of her last book, The Chronicles of a Garden: its Pets and Pleasures (1863) be donated to the campaign.

Wilson never married, and died of heart disease on 19 September 1863.
