= Mary Safford =

American Unitarian minister

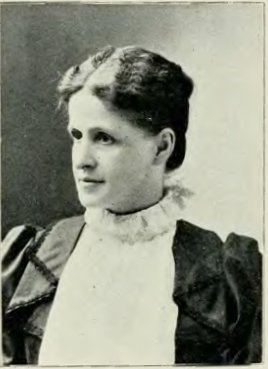
- Reverend Doctor Mary Safford
- Born: December 23, 1851; Hamilton, Illinois
- Died: October 25, 1927 (aged 75)
- Occupation: minister

Mary Augusta Safford (December 23, 1851 – October 25, 1927) was an American Unitarian minister. An influential figure in the development of the Unitarian Universalist church in the Midwestern United States, she was a member of the informally-designated group of religious figures known as the "Iowa Sisterhood", as was her childhood friend Eleanor Gordon.

== Biography ==
Safford was born in Hamilton, Illinois, and received her first education from her parents. She began preaching as a child on the family farm, standing on a tree stump to deliver her sermons. She studied for a year at the University of Iowa before leaving due to illness, both hers and that of her older sister; returning to Illinois, she took a position as a teacher. In 1871 she and Gordon founded the Hawthorne Literary Society; in 1880, the two women were ordained and took over leadership of the Christian Unity Church in Humboldt, Iowa. Her family was against her decision to become a Unitarian, and further objected to her desire to join the clergy. She continued serving Unitarian churches in Iowa for the next thirty years, including working from 1885 to 1889 in Sioux City; furthermore, as executive secretary of the Iowa Unitarian Association she also assisted in the foundation of new congregations.

While living in Des Moines, Reverend Safford was an active member of Des Moines Women's Club from 1899 to 1910. Mary Collson was among the clergy she mentored during her career. Safford retired to Florida in 1910, helping to found the Unitarian Church in Orlando until her death, which was likely precipitated by a fall which broke her hip, after which she used a wheelchair. Her home in Orlando was converted into an art museum after her death.
