= Annie Nowlin Savery =

American suffragist and philanthropist (1831–1891)

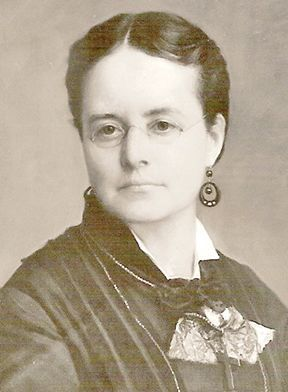
- Born: 1831; London, England
- Died: April 14, 1891 (aged 59–60); New York City, U.S.A.
- Education: University of Iowa
- Occupations: Suffragist, philanthropist
- Spouse: James C. Savery

Annie Nowlin Savery (born Annie Nowlin, 1831, London – April 14, 1891, New York City) was an American suffragist and philanthropist based in Des Moines, Iowa. She is known as a pioneer feminist and activist for woman suffrage. She began taking part in the woman suffrage movement in the 1860s, and became a leader in the county and state, speaking widely and helping establish organizations to support it.

After a bill to amend the state constitution for woman suffrage was defeated in 1872, Savery worked on other civic interests. She donated to the city public library, and helped found the first public hospital in the city. In 1875 Savery and another woman became the first two women graduates of the University of Iowa College of Law, where she studied the rights of married women. She passed the bar and was licensed to appear before Supreme Courts. Savery was posthumously inducted into the Iowa Women's Hall of Fame in 1997.

== Early life ==
Annie Nowlin was born in London in 1831 and immigrated as an infant with her family to the United States, where they settled in New York. As a young woman, she married James C. Savery, a young businessman and real estate speculator born November 30, 1824, in Massachusetts. They married in Saratoga Springs, New York, on January 20, 1852.

They moved to Des Moines, Iowa, in April 1864, then a town of 1500. They bought the log Marvin House for $3,000, and adapted it as a hotel, which she ran for a period. They had a house built on Grand Avenue, where they later did much entertaining.

Meanwhile, her husband built a modern hotel with partners, which opened in 1862 as the Savery Hotel. Her husband reinvested revenue from the hotel and by 1870, the value of their real estate had increased from $10,000 to $250,000 ($6.37 million in 2025 dollars) as the city developed and settlement increased. For decades, Des Moines also was important as a city on the migrant trail of pioneers to the West and flourished with trade. The couple sold the Savery Hotel in 1878, and the new owners renamed it as "The Hotel Kirkwood".

Among his successful enterprises, her husband was one of the founders of the American Emigration Company, which recruited and helped settle nearly one hundred thousand immigrants from Scandinavia in Iowa and nearby states. Later he invested in banking and western lands, and in mining in Montana.

While not known to have much formal education in her early life, Annie Savery read widely and deeply, and was known for her study of many fields. She was the center of intellectual life in Des Moines, and supported culture. Accounts vary as to her later study: one says she hired a tutor to teach her the French language. According to The Biographical Dictionary of Iowa, she taught herself French. In the 1870s she entered law school at the University of Iowa, graduating in 1875.

== Career ==
Savery is best known as a feminist pioneer and for her early participation in the woman suffrage movement in Iowa, beginning in the 1860s. She made her first speech about woman suffrage in January 1868 in Des Moines. In 1870, she later helped start the first woman suffrage society in Polk County, Iowa.

During the 1870s, she was on the executive committee of the National Woman Suffrage Association. Savery worked closely with leaders such as Lucy Stone, Isabella Beecher Hooker, Elizabeth Cady Stanton, and Susan B. Anthony. When Stanton and Anthony collaborated with Victoria Woodhull, who supported free love, the partnership garnered negative opinions, especially in conservative Iowa. Woodhull gained national prominence after her testimony before Congress about women's suffrage. Savery worked to negotiate the difficulties, continuing to stress that women could support woment's rights independent of their opinions about such side issues as free love.

An Iowa woman suffrage bill was passed in committee in 1870 to amend the state constitution. If it was passed a second time in a succeeding session, the bill for a state constitutional amendment would be released to be voted on by the public. It was debated in 1872 by the full state legislature, and the controversy about Woodhull and free love proponents in the women's movement derailed important support. The bill did not pass a second time. Afterward, many activists in the state retreated and the movement was dominated by conservatives. They withdrew support from Savery as their spokeswoman. No woman suffrage bill was proposed in Iowa again until 1916, a few years before the national constitutional amendment was passed in 1919, giving women the vote.

Savery turned to other fields, acting as financial partner in establishing a beekeeping operation in 1871 with Ellen Smith Tupper. The bees were kept on the Savery property on Grand. Savery also donated to the Des Moines Public Library and started a scholarship program for women at Iowa College, now called Grinnell College. She helped reform conditions at the county jail.

After the Saverys' residence on Grand burned down in 1874, they moved into a suite of their hotel. Savery had enrolled in the University of Iowa College of Law and was one of two women in her class; she graduated with high honors in 1875, They were the first two women to graduate from law school in the state. Savery passed the bar, and was among the first women licensed to appear before the Supreme Courts. She did not intend to practice law, but wanted to learn more about the rights of married women, and to show women that professional fields were open to them.

In 1876, Savery helped raise funds to establish the first public hospital in Des Moines. She was among the many women in the 19th century who were integral to establishing and supporting libraries and hospitals for their communities.

== Later years and death ==
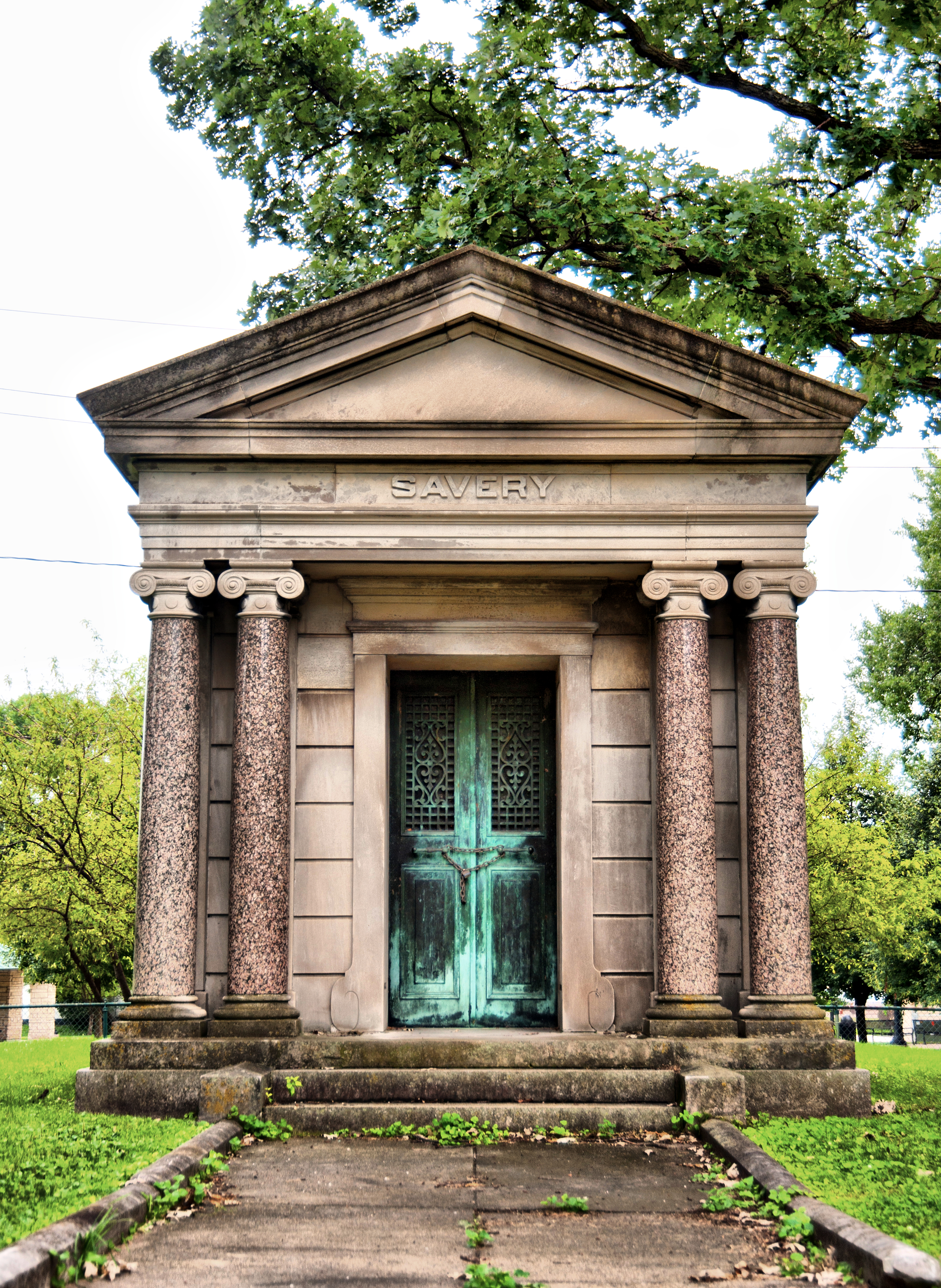
Savery Mausoleum at Woodland Cemetery in Des Moines

After losing their house to fire and struggling financially during the depression of the 1870s, the Saverys moved to Montana in 1878, where her husband recovered his fortune in mining and other investments. They established residence in New York in 1883, where Savery was treated for chronic heart disease. They also kept ties to Des Moines. Savery traveled extensively in Europe in her later years, as a way of continuing her studies. Facing declining health, in the 1880s Savery became deeply involved in Theosophy, a kind of pantheism.

She died on April 14, 1891, in New York City. Her body was returned to Des Moines for the funeral. Her friend Judge Nathaniel M. Hubbard from Cedar Rapids, a leader in the Republican Party, was the main speaker at the funeral, praising her intellectual pursuits and capacity. Survived by her husband, Savery was buried in Des Moines in the Savery Mausoleum which he established at Woodland Cemetery. Her husband died August 27, 1905, and was also buried in the family mausoleum at Woodland Cemetery.

== Legacy and honors ==
In 1997, Savery was posthumously inducted into the Iowa Women's Hall of Fame.
