= Eleanor Gordon =

American Unitarian minister

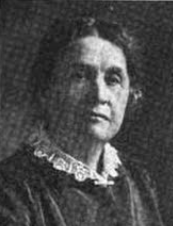
Eleanor Elizabeth Gordon, 1921

Eleanor Elizabeth Gordon (October 10, 1852 – January 6, 1942) was an American Unitarian minister. Part of an informal network of Unitarian women ministers known as the "Iowa Sisterhood", she was often partnered in her work with Mary Safford.

Gordon was born in Hamilton, Illinois, and was the oldest of six children of Samuel and Parmelia (Alvord) Gordon. She grew up in a family where religious debate was common and where the work of Ralph Waldo Emerson and Theodore Parker was greatly admired. Mary Safford lived on a neighboring farm, and the two were close friends from youth. From 1873 to 1874 she attended the University of Iowa. She was then invited by Safford to assist with the Unitarian congregations in Humboldt and Sioux City, Iowa. She proceeded to study at Cornell University for one semester prior to ordination, which occurred in 1889. An advocate for women's educational opportunities, she served four other congregations. Among those whose studies she supported was Mary Collson. Gordon and Safford published Old and New, a magazine, between 1891 and 1908. From 1907 until 1910 she served as field secretary of the Unitarian Conference of Iowa, and for ten years facilitated its communications. From 1906 to 1910 she was a resident of the Roadside Settlement House in Des Moines. She organized a Unitarian congregation in Orlando, Florida, in 1912. Gordon retired from active ministry in 1918. She died in Keokuk, Iowa, and is buried in the town of her birth.

== See also ==
- Unitarian Universalism
