= Mary Jane Coggeshall =

American suffragist

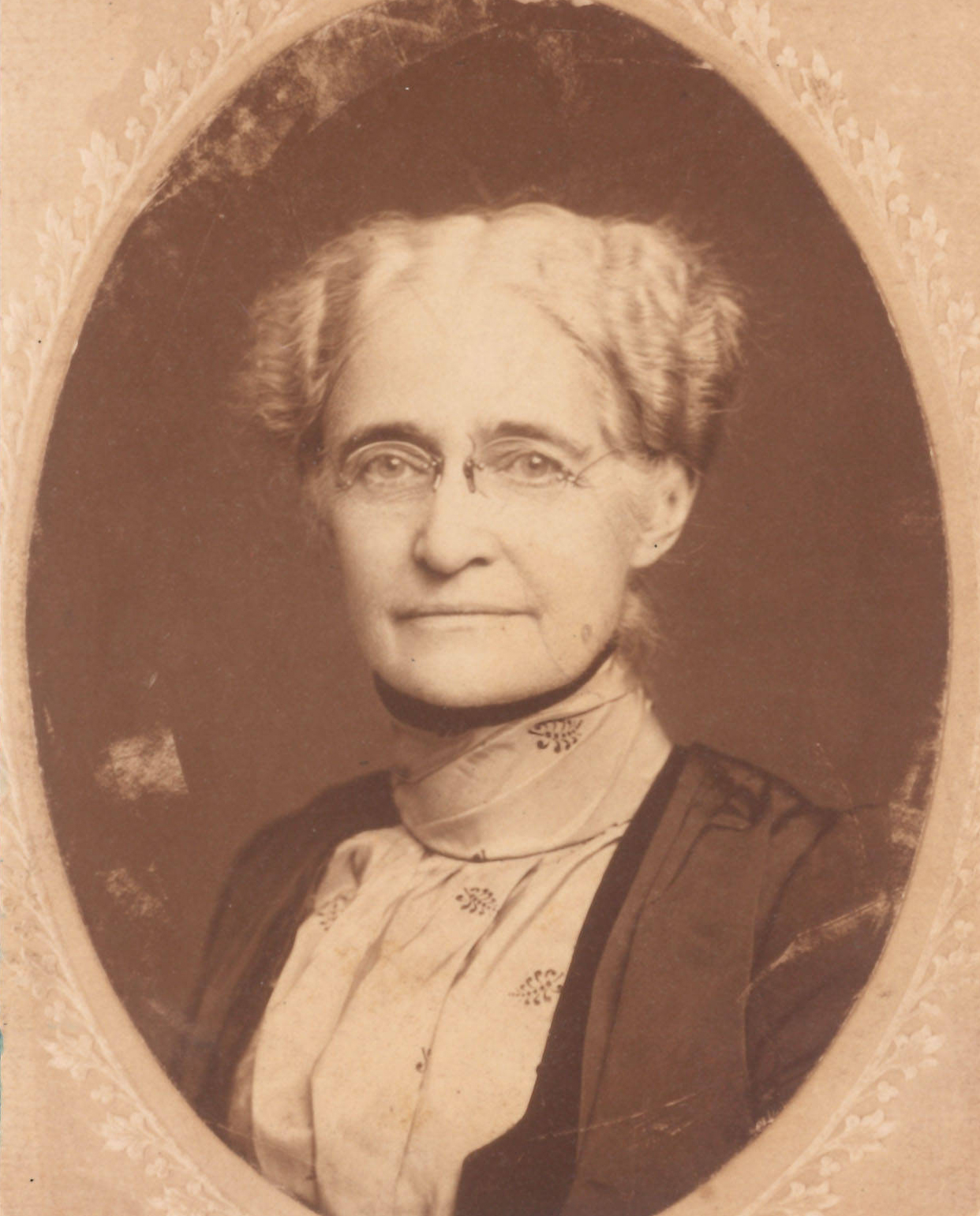
- Mary Jane Coggeshall
- Born: Mary Jane Whitely; January 17, 1836; Milton, Indiana
- Died: December 22, 1911 (aged 75)
- Occupation: Suffragist
- Spouse: John Milton Coggeshall (m. 1857; died in 1889)

Mary Jane (Whitely) Coggeshall (January 17, 1836–December 22, 1911) was an American suffragist known as the "mother of woman suffrage in Iowa". She was inducted into the Iowa Women's Hall of Fame in 1990.

== Early years and education ==
Mary Jane Whitely was born January 17, 1836, in Milton, Indiana, to Isaac Whitely (a farmer) and Lydia (Gunderson) Whitely, who helped support the family by taking in sewing. The family were Quakers, and Isaac kept a station on the Underground Railroad. Whitely attended public schools in Milton.

In 1857, she married John Milton Coggeshall, with whom she had three children, two of whom survived: Clair and Anna. The couple moved to Des Moines, Iowa, in 1865.

== Career as activist ==
In 1870, Coggeshall became a charter member and secretary of Iowa's Polk County Woman Suffrage Society and was later (1898) president of the Des Moines Equal Suffrage Club. Her most influential suffrage activity, however, stemmed from her involvement with the Iowa Woman Suffrage Association (IWSA), of which she was a charter member. She served as its president (1890, 1891, 1903–05) and then as honorary president (1905–11). In the latter capacity, she marched in America's third-ever women's suffrage parade, which took place in Boone, Iowa, in 1908.

Coggeshall was the first editor (1886–88) of the IWSA's monthly Woman's Standard, Iowa's main suffrage newspaper, founded by Martha Callanan. She returned to edit the paper again in 1911. She frequently wrote for the paper after her first editorship ended, as well as for national newspapers.

In 1895, Coggeshall was elected to the board of the National American Woman Suffrage Association (NAWSA), becoming the first woman from west of the Mississippi River to join the NAWSA board and the only one of the early Iowa suffragists to be active at the national level. She spoke at the NAWSA national conventions in 1904 and 1907.

Coggeshall not only lectured and wrote on suffrage, she got involved in a major lawsuit. In 1894, the state of Iowa had passed a law allowing women to vote in city bond elections. In 1908, when the city of Des Moines defied this law and denied women ballots in just such an election, Coggeshall brought a lawsuit against the city. The Iowa Supreme Court held that the election was void because women, as a class were barred from voting.

Coggeshall died of pneumonia on December 22, 1911. Although she did not live to see American women get the vote, fellow suffragist Carrie Chapman Catt dubbed her "the mother of woman suffrage in Iowa".

== Legacy ==
Following Coggeshall's death, the IWSA and the Men's League for Woman's Suffrage together set up the Mary J. Coggeshall Memorial Fund, whose mission was to support activities leading to the passage of a suffrage amendment to the Iowa Constitution.

In 1977, the State Historical Society of Iowa and the Iowa Department of Transportation set up a roadside marker honoring notable people from Des Moines, among whom Coggeshall was included.

In 1990, Coggeshall was inducted into the Iowa Women's Hall of Fame.

An archive of Coggeshall's papers—mainly speeches and writings—is held by the Schlesinger Library of the Radcliffe Institute for Advanced Study at Harvard University.
