= Sue M. Wilson Brown =

American suffrage activist (1877–1941)

- Born: Sue M. Wilson; September 8, 1877; Staunton, Virginia
- Died: January 1, 1941 (aged 63); Des Moines, Iowa
- Occupations: Clubwoman, Activist

Sue M. Wilson Brown (September 8, 1877 – January 1, 1941) was an African-American activist for women's suffrage. She was inducted into the Iowa Women's Hall of Fame in 1995.

== Biography ==
Brown was born on September 8, 1877, in Staunton, Virginia, to Jacob Wilson and Maria Harris Wilson. As a child her family moved to Iowa, living near Buxton and mining coal. Brown was educated at the Oskaloosa High School and moved to Des Moines after marrying Samuel Joe Brown on December 31, 1902.

In Des Moines, she became involved with the Iowa Federation of Colored Women's Clubs, editing their Iowa Colored Woman for two years beginning in 1907. Brown also founded several clubs, which included the Des Moines Intellectual Improvement Club, the Mary B. Talbert Club, the Des Moines Mary Church Terrell Club and an Auxiliary to the American Red Cross. Beginning in 1915, Brown was president of the Iowa Federation of Colored Women and worked to provide housing for African-American women attending the University of Iowa and advocated for women's suffrage. Her term ended in 1917.

Brown established the Des Moines League of Colored Women Voters in August 1919, becoming its first president. She spoke at the Iowa Equal Suffrage Association's convention and later the Iowa League of Women Voters convention. Brown also attended various conventions of the Republican Party on a local and state level, chairing Polk County's Republican Committee and becoming vice-president of the National League of Republican Colored Women.

She was also involved in the NAACP in Des Moines, forming a "junior chapter" in 1922 and holding the role of president of the local branch from 1925 to 1930. Brown served on or led several commissions aimed at improving race relations in Iowa as well as being a prominent member of the Prince Hall Order of the Eastern Star. In 1925, Brown published The History of the Order of the Eastern Star among Colored People.

Brown died on January 1, 1941, in Des Moines. She was inducted into the Iowa Women's Hall of Fame in 1995.
