= Iowa Federation of Colored Women's Clubs =

- Iowa Federation Home for Colored Girls
- U.S. National Register of Historic Places
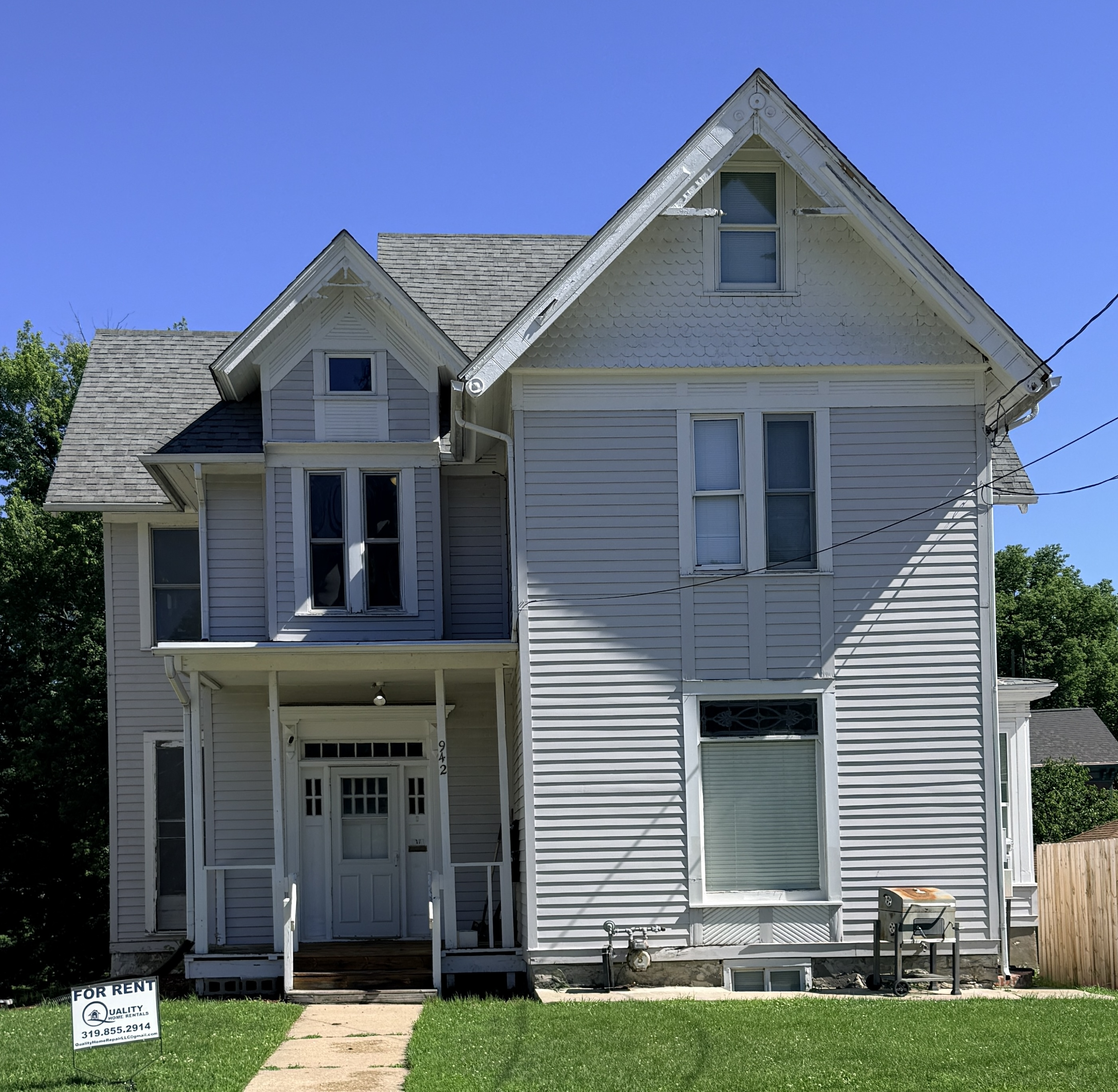
- Iowa Federation Home for Colored Girls in 2026

- Location within Iowa Location within the United States
- Location: 942 Iowa Ave. Iowa City, Iowa
- Coordinates: 41°39′41″N 91°31′16″W
- Area: less than one acre
- NRHP reference No.: 82000412
- Added to NRHP: December 6, 2019

The Iowa Federation of Colored Women's Clubs (IFCWC) was an umbrella organization serving African-American women's clubs in Iowa. The motto of IFCWC was "Sowing Seeds of Kindness", and the organization was affiliated with the National Association of Colored Women. The club produced a journal called the Iowa Colored Woman. IFCWC sent delegates to represent the state at national conventions and opportunities such as "Colored Women's day" at the 1939 New York World's Fair. The IFCWC is also known for creating a black women's dormitory for the University of Iowa before the school was fully integrated. The building has been listed on the National Register of Historic Places.

== About ==
The IFCWC was created in May 1902 and was at first known as the Iowa Association of Colored Women's Clubs. The first convention met in Ottumwa with only a few women and their clubs attending. The first president was Helen Downey. By 1904, there were 300 women attending the annual conference and clubs from all cities large enough to support them sent representatives. By 1914, the IFCWC represented 40 different African-American women's clubs in Iowa. Also in that year, the IFCWC created a committee dedicated to women's suffrage, which was headed by Teresa Adams.

=== Iowa Federation Home for Colored Girls ===
In 1912, it was proposed by the president of IFCWC, Mrs. J.B. Rush, that a home for black working women be established. In 1919, the IFCWC purchased a home, known later as the "Federation Home", at 942 Iowa Avenue in Iowa City. White neighbors protested the sale of a house to African Americans, successfully demanding that the lot's price be reassessed, causing IFCWC to pay more money for their purchase. In 1934, the home was renamed "Sue Brown Hall" after a prominent member of the IFCWC. The home allowed black women who wanted to attend the University of Iowa to have a place to stay, since they were not allowed in the dorms until 1947. The home closed in 1950. The building is protected as a local landmark in Iowa City, and it was listed on the National Register of Historic Places in 2019.

== Notable members ==
- Sue M. Wilson Brown (1877–1941), suffragist
- Naomi Pollard Dobson (1883–1971), librarian and educator
