= Barn =

Agricultural building used for storage and as a covered workplace

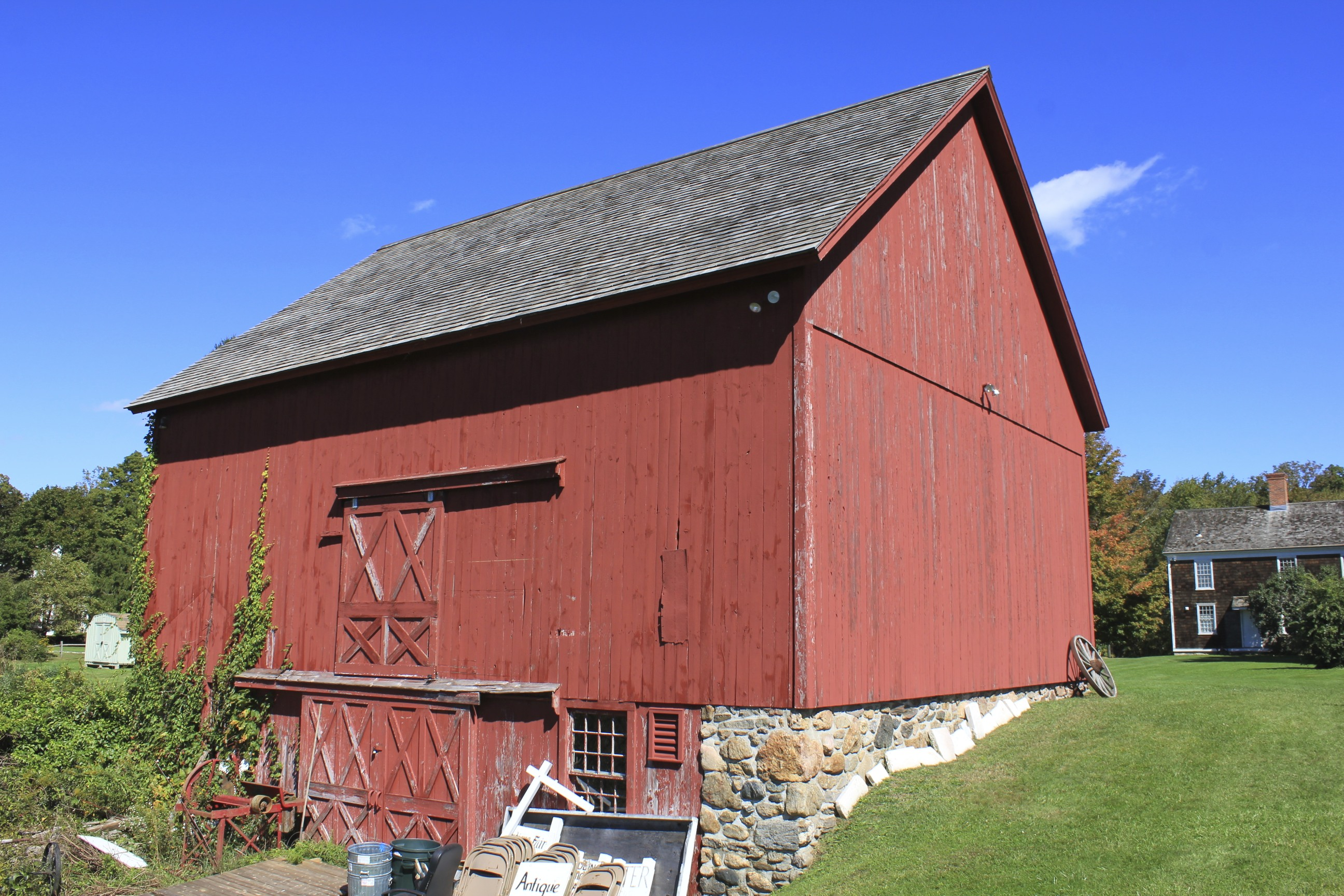
Timber framed with siding of vertical boards was typical in early New England. The traditional color is the result of iron oxide stain applied to protect the wood from UV damage.

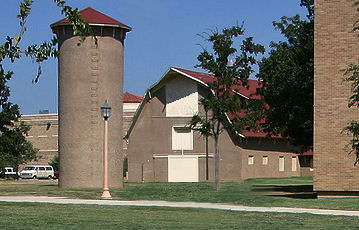
The Texas Technological College Dairy Barn in Lubbock, Texas, U.S., was used as a teaching facility until 1967.

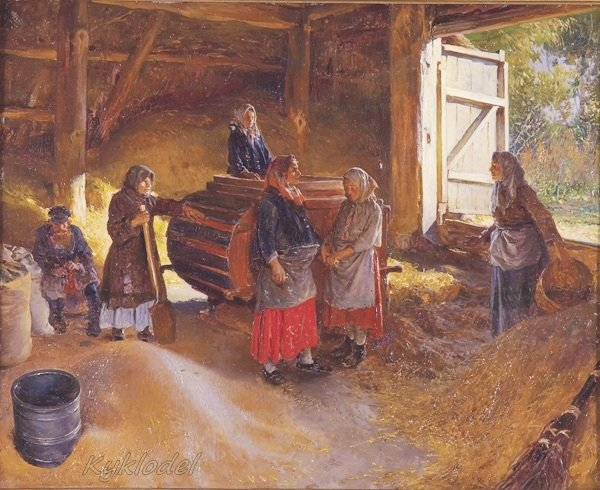
Russian women using a hand powered winnowing machine in a threshing barn. Note the board across the doorway to prevent grain from spilling out of the barn, this is the origin of the term threshold. Painting from 1894 by Klavdy Lebedev titled the floor or the threshing floor (Гумно).

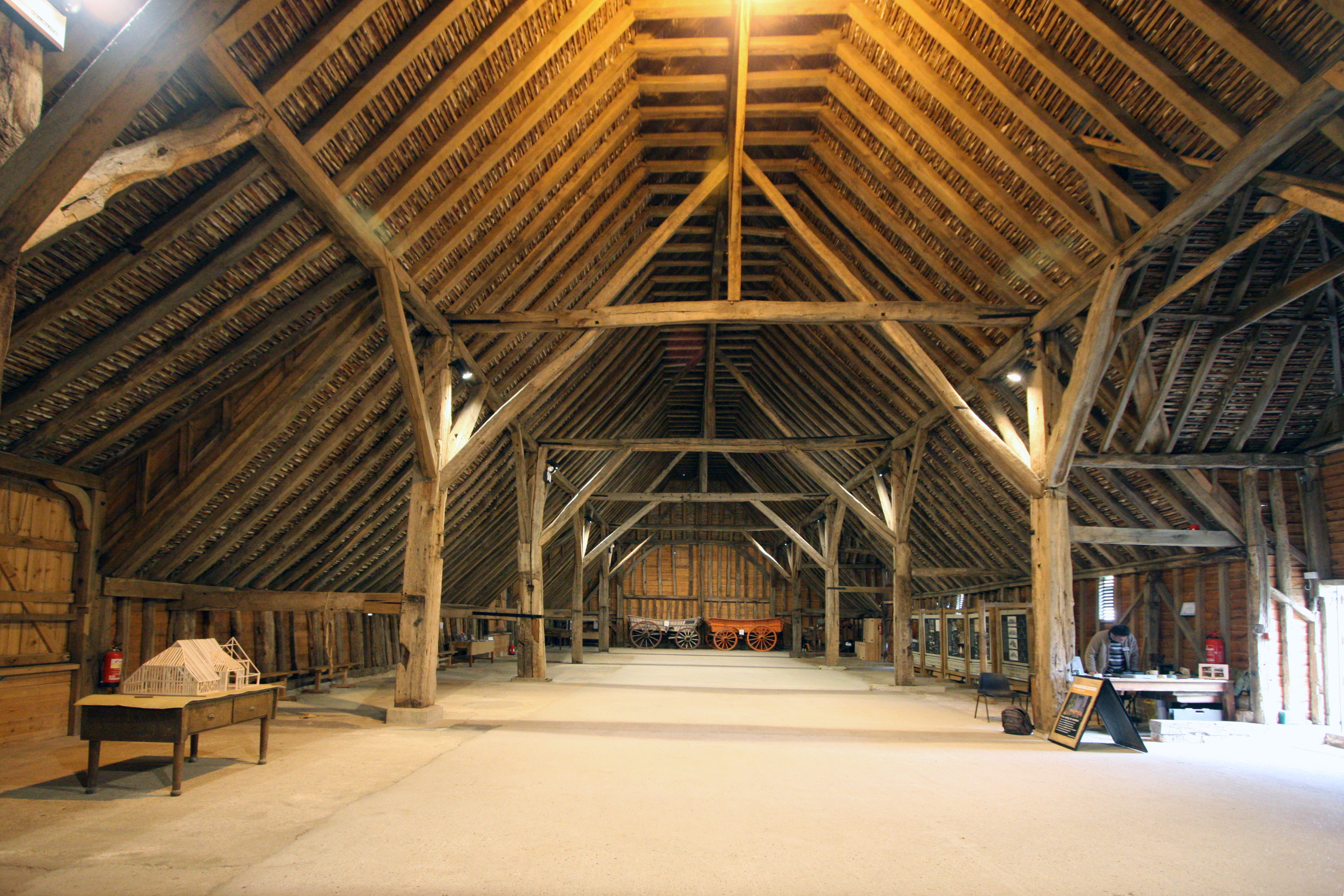
Grange Barn, Coggeshall, England, originally part of the Cistercian monastery of Coggeshall. Dendrochronologically dated from 1237 to 1269, it was restored in the 1980s by the Coggeshall Grange Barn Trust, Braintree District Council and Essex County Council.

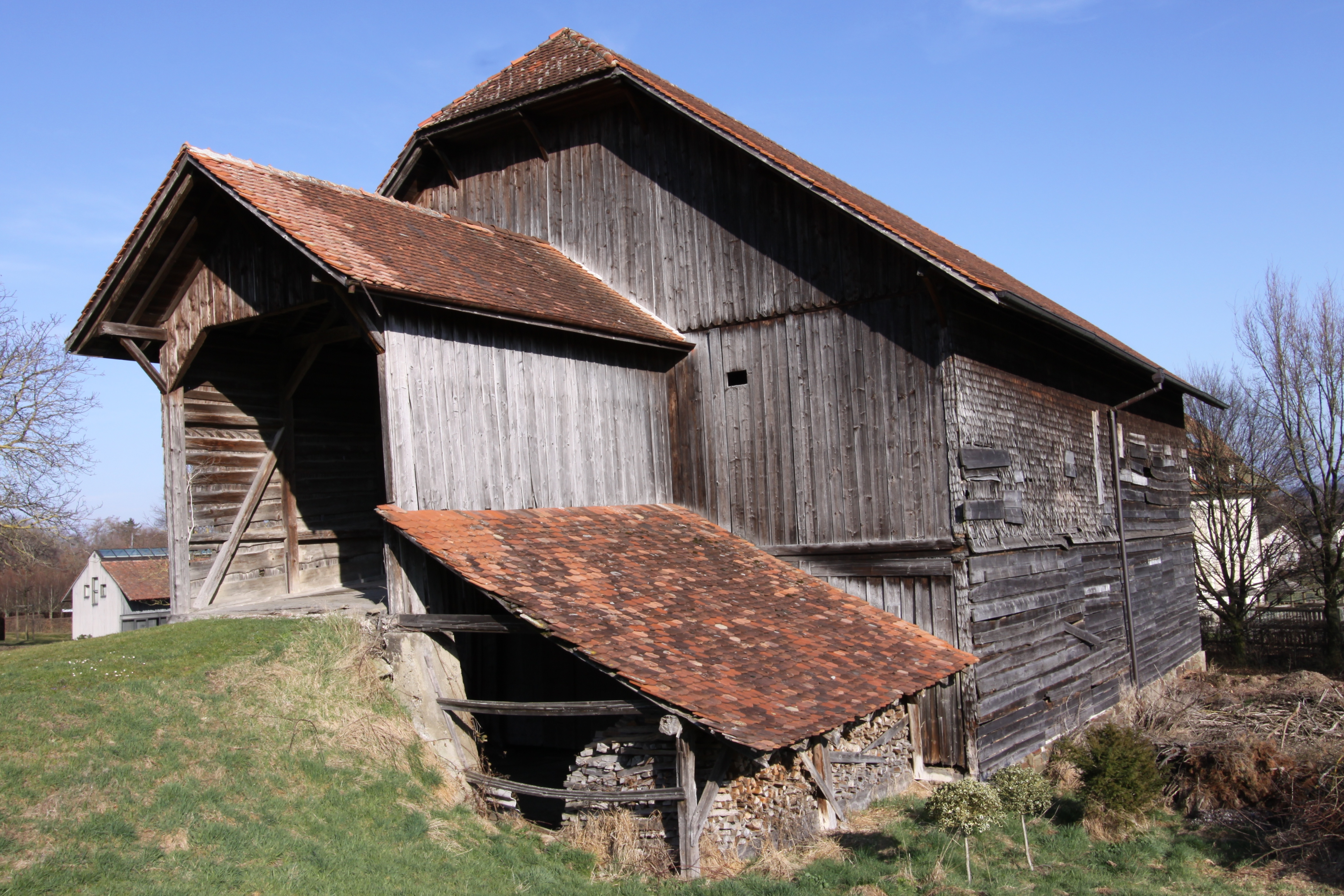
A bridge barn in Switzerland. The bridge (rather than a ramp) in this case also shelters animals.

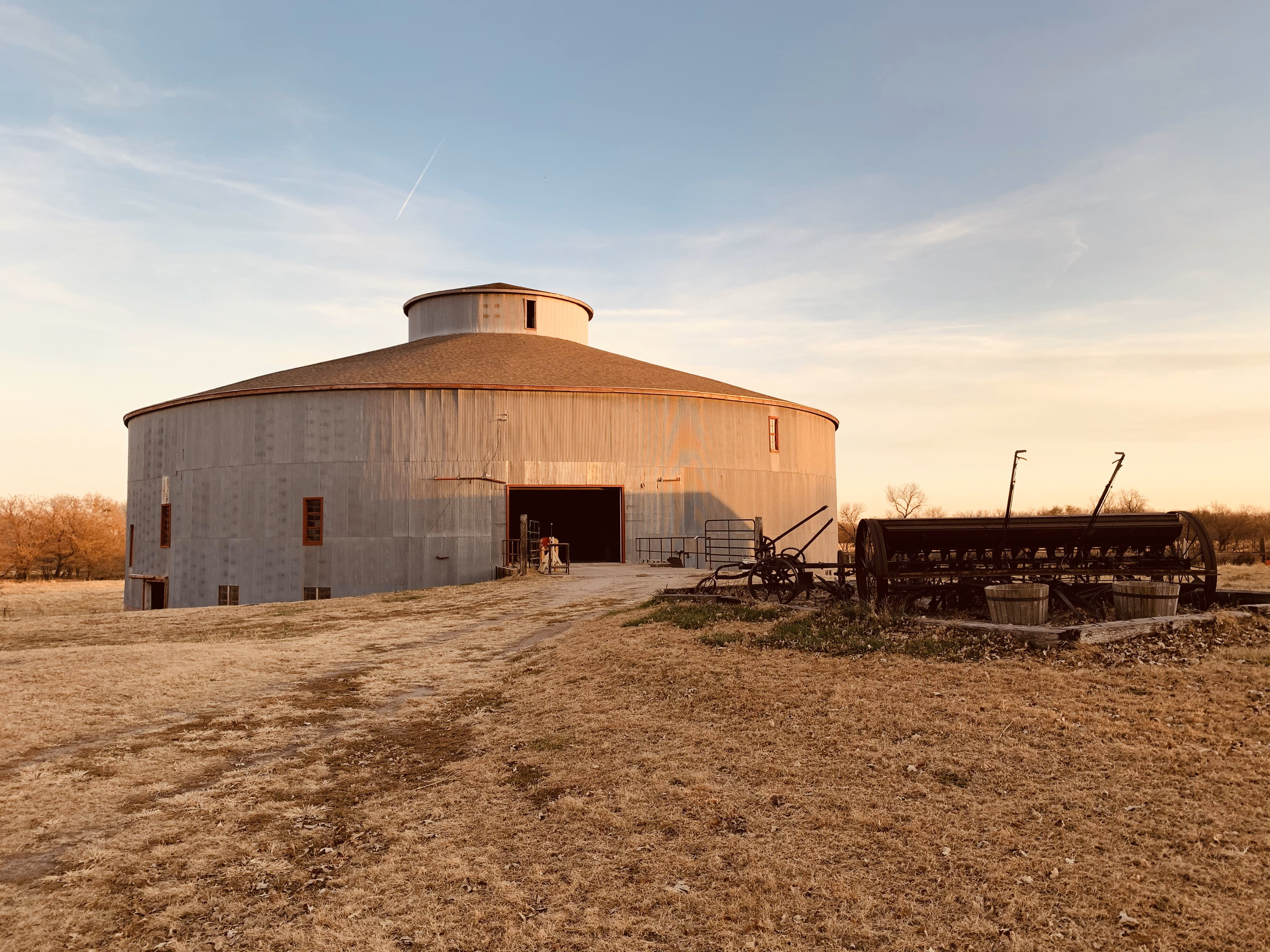
Starke Round Barn in Red Cloud, Nebraska, the largest freestanding barn in the United States.

A barn is an agricultural building usually on farms and used for various purposes. In North America, a barn refers to structures that house livestock, including cattle and horses, as well as equipment and fodder, and often grain. As a result, the term barn is often qualified e.g. tobacco barn, dairy barn, cow house, sheep barn, potato barn. In the British Isles and in Europe, the term barn is restricted mainly to storage structures for unthreshed cereals and fodder, the terms byre, shippon or shippen being applied to cow shelters, whereas horses are kept in buildings known as stables. In mainland Europe, however, barns were often part of integrated structures known as byre-dwellings (or housebarns in US literature). In addition, barns may be used for equipment storage, as a covered workplace, and for activities such as threshing.

== Etymology ==
The word barn comes from the Old English bere, for barley (or grain in general), and aern, for a storage place—thus, a storehouse for barley. The word bere-ern, also spelled bern and bearn, is attested to at least sixty times in homilies and other Old English prose. The related words bere-tun and bere-flor both meant threshing floor. Bere-tun also meant granary; the literal translation of bere-tun is "grain enclosure". While the only literary attestation of bere-hus (also granary) comes from the Dialogi of Gregory the Great, there are four known mentions of bere-tun and two of bere-flor. A Thesaurus of Old English lists bere-ærn and melu-hudern ("meal-store house") as synonyms for barn.

== History ==
The modern barn largely developed from the three aisled medieval barn, commonly known as tithe barn or monastic barn. This, in turn, originated in a 12th-century building tradition, also applied in halls and ecclesiastical buildings. In the 15th century several thousands of these huge barns were to be found in Western Europe. In the course of time, its construction method was adopted by normal farms, and it gradually spread to simpler buildings and other rural areas. As a rule, the aisled barn had large entrance doors and a passage corridor for loaded wagons. The storage floors between the central posts or in the aisles were known as bays or mows (from Middle French moye).

The main types were large barns with sideway passages, compact barns with a central entrance and smaller barns with a transverse passage. The latter also spread to Eastern Europe. Whenever stone walls were applied, the aisled timber frame often gave way to single-naved buildings. A special type were byre-dwellings, which included living quarters, byres and stables, such as the Frisian farmhouse or Gulf house and the Black Forest house. Not all, however, evolved from the medieval barn. Other types descended from the prehistoric longhouse or other building traditions. One of the latter was the Low German (hall) house, in which the harvest was stored in the attic. In many cases, the New World colonial barn evolved from the Low German house, which was transformed to a real barn by first generation colonists from the Netherlands and Germany.

== Construction ==
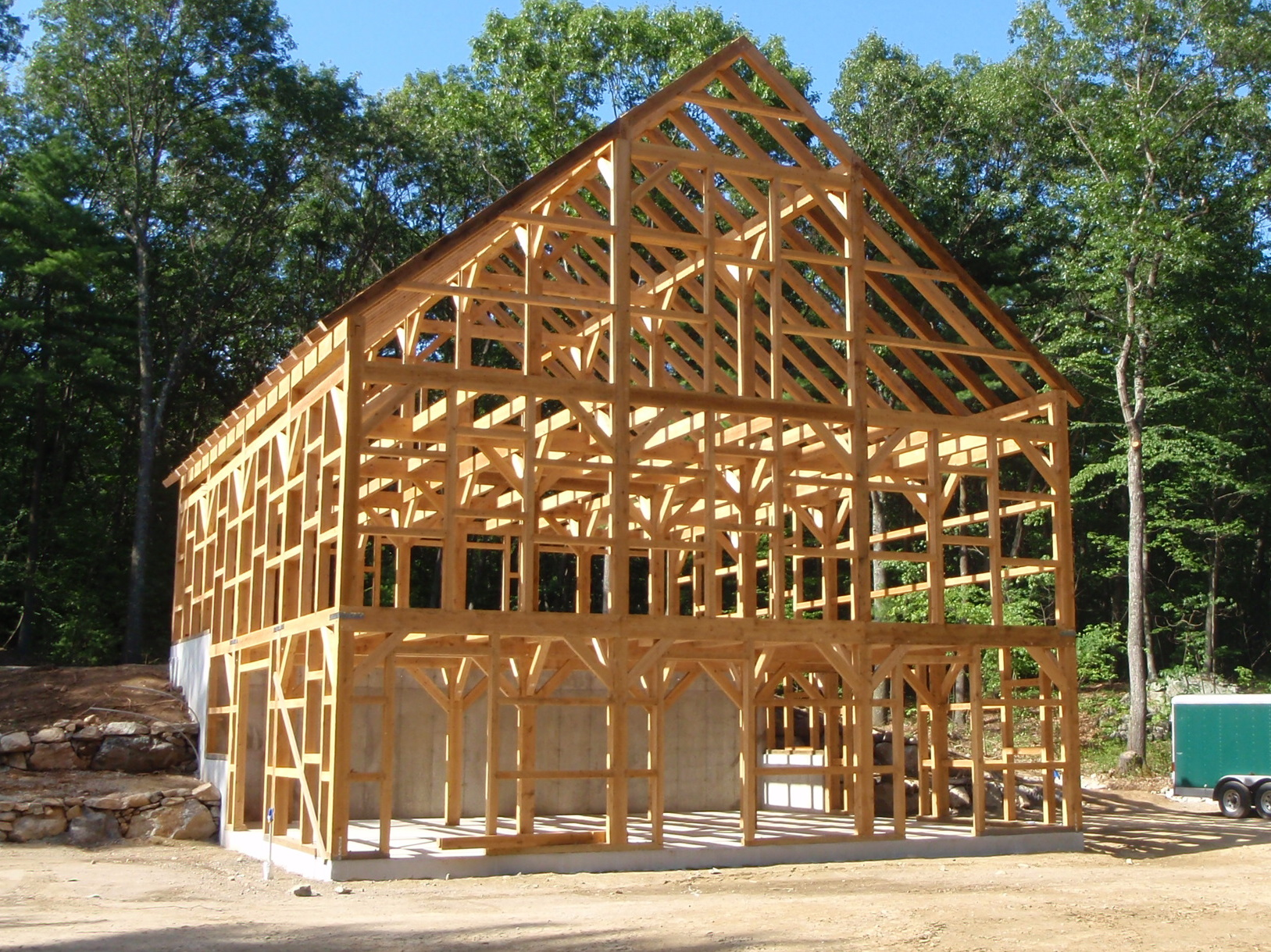
The skeleton of a post and beam horse barn just after raising

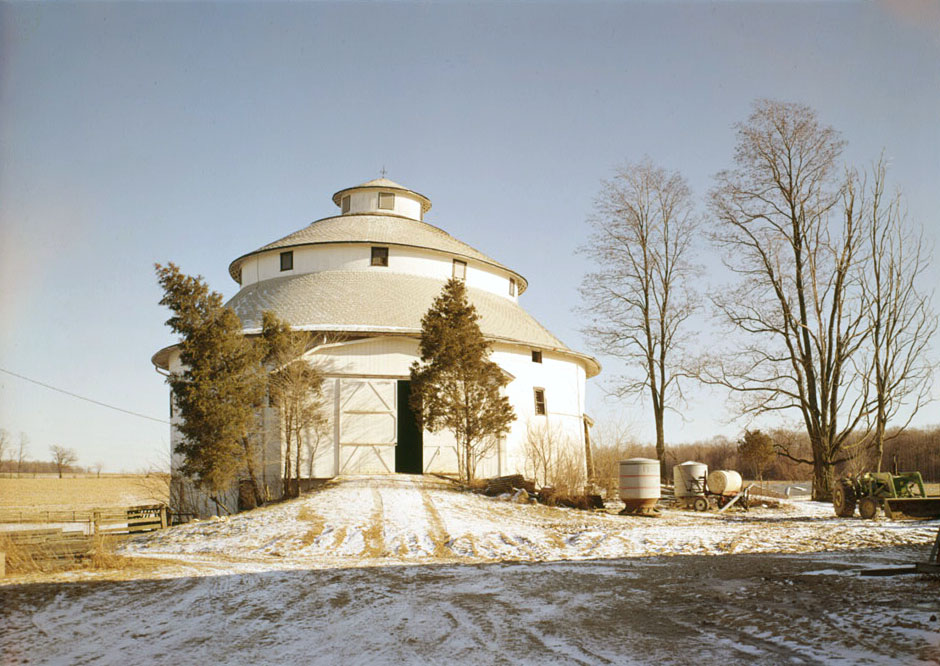
Thomas Ranck Round Barn in Fayette County, Indiana, U.S.

In the Yorkshire Dales, England, barns, known locally as cowhouses were built from double stone walls with truffs or throughstones acting as wall ties. In the U.S., older barns were built from timbers hewn from trees on the farm and built as a log crib barn or timber frame, although stone barns were sometimes built in areas where stone was a cheaper building material. In the mid to late 19th century in the U.S. barn framing methods began to shift away from traditional timber framing to "truss framed" or "plank framed" buildings. Truss or plank framed barns reduced the number of timbers instead using dimensional lumber for the rafters, joists, and sometimes the trusses. The joints began to become bolted or nailed instead of being mortised and tenoned. The inventor and patentee of the Jennings Barn claimed his design used less lumber, less work, less time, and less cost to build and were durable and provided more room for hay storage. Mechanization on the farm, better transportation infrastructure, and new technology like a hay fork mounted on a track contributed to a need for larger, more open barns, sawmills using steam power could produce smaller pieces of lumber affordably, and machine cut nails were much less expensive than hand-made (wrought) nails. Concrete block began to be used for barns in the early 20th century in the U.S.

Modern barns are more typically steel buildings. From about 1900 to 1940, many large dairy barns were built in northern USA. These commonly have gambrel or hip roofs to maximize the size of the hay loft above the dairy roof, and have become associated in the popular image of a dairy farm. The barns that were common to the wheatbelt held large numbers of pulling horses such as Clydesdales or Percherons. These large wooden barns, especially when filled with hay, could make spectacular fires that were usually total losses for the farmers. With the advent of balers it became possible to store hay and straw outdoors in stacks surrounded by a plowed fireguard. Many barns in the northern United States are painted barn red with a white trim. One possible reason for this is that ferric oxide, which is used to create red paint, was the cheapest and most readily available chemical for farmers in New England and nearby areas. Another possible reason is that ferric oxide acts a preservative and so painting a barn with it would help to protect the structure. The custom of painting barns in red with white trim is widely spread in Scandinavia. Especially in Sweden the Falu red with white trims is the traditional colouring of most wooden buildings.

With the popularity of tractors following World War II many barns were taken down or replaced with modern Quonset huts made of plywood or galvanized steel. Beef ranches and dairies began building smaller loftless barns often of Quonset huts or of steel walls on a treated wood frame (old telephone or power poles). By the 1960s it was found that cattle receive sufficient shelter from trees or wind fences (usually wooden slabs 20% open).

== Gallery of barns with different wall building materials ==
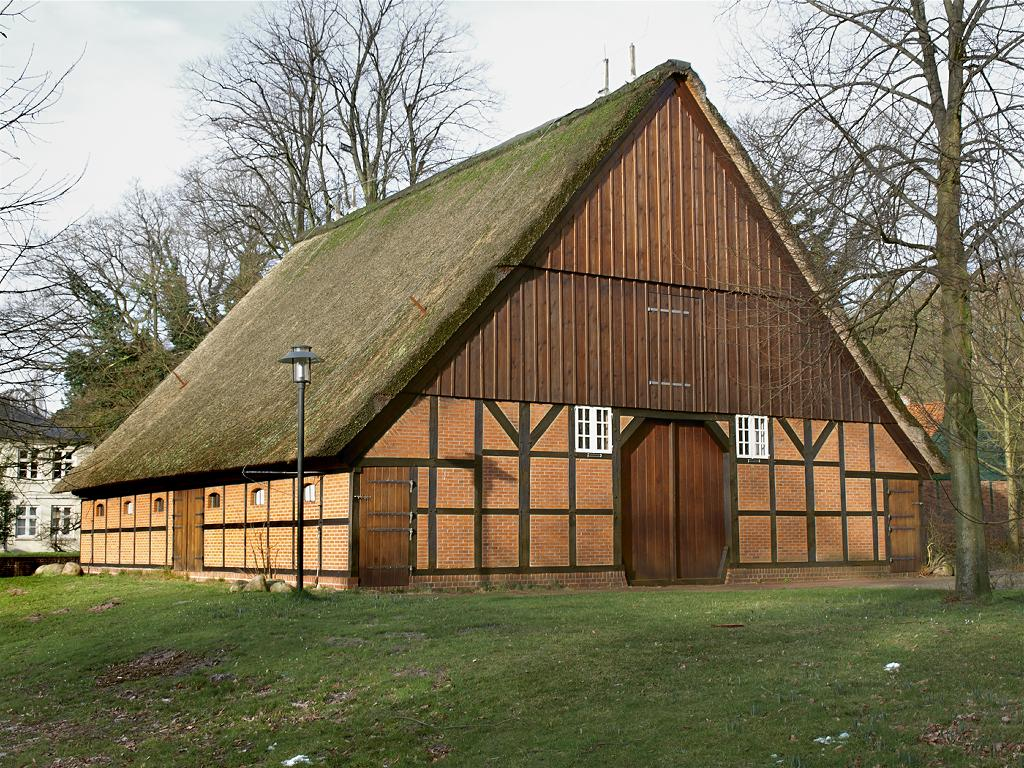
Half-timbered barn with brick infill. Uetersen, Germany. This barn's proportions resemble a Low German house.

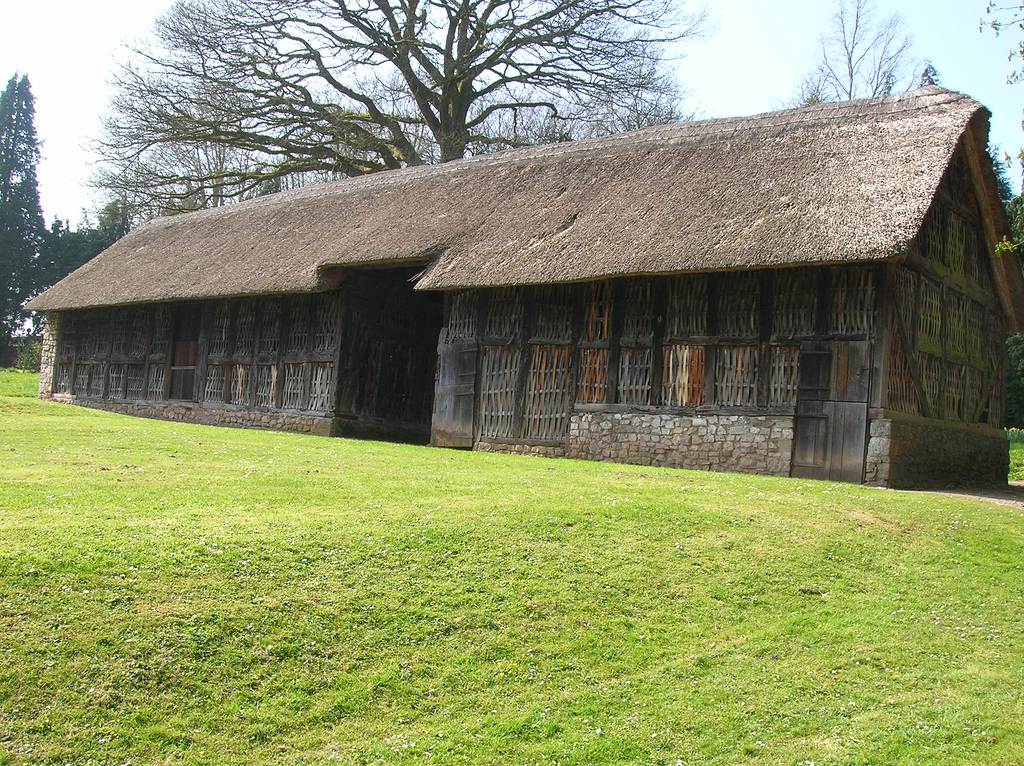
Half-timbered with wattle-work walls for ventilation. Stryd Lydan Barn, originally at Llannerch Banna, Flintshire, North Wales. Re-erected at the St Fagans National History Museum, Cardiff, Wales in 1951.

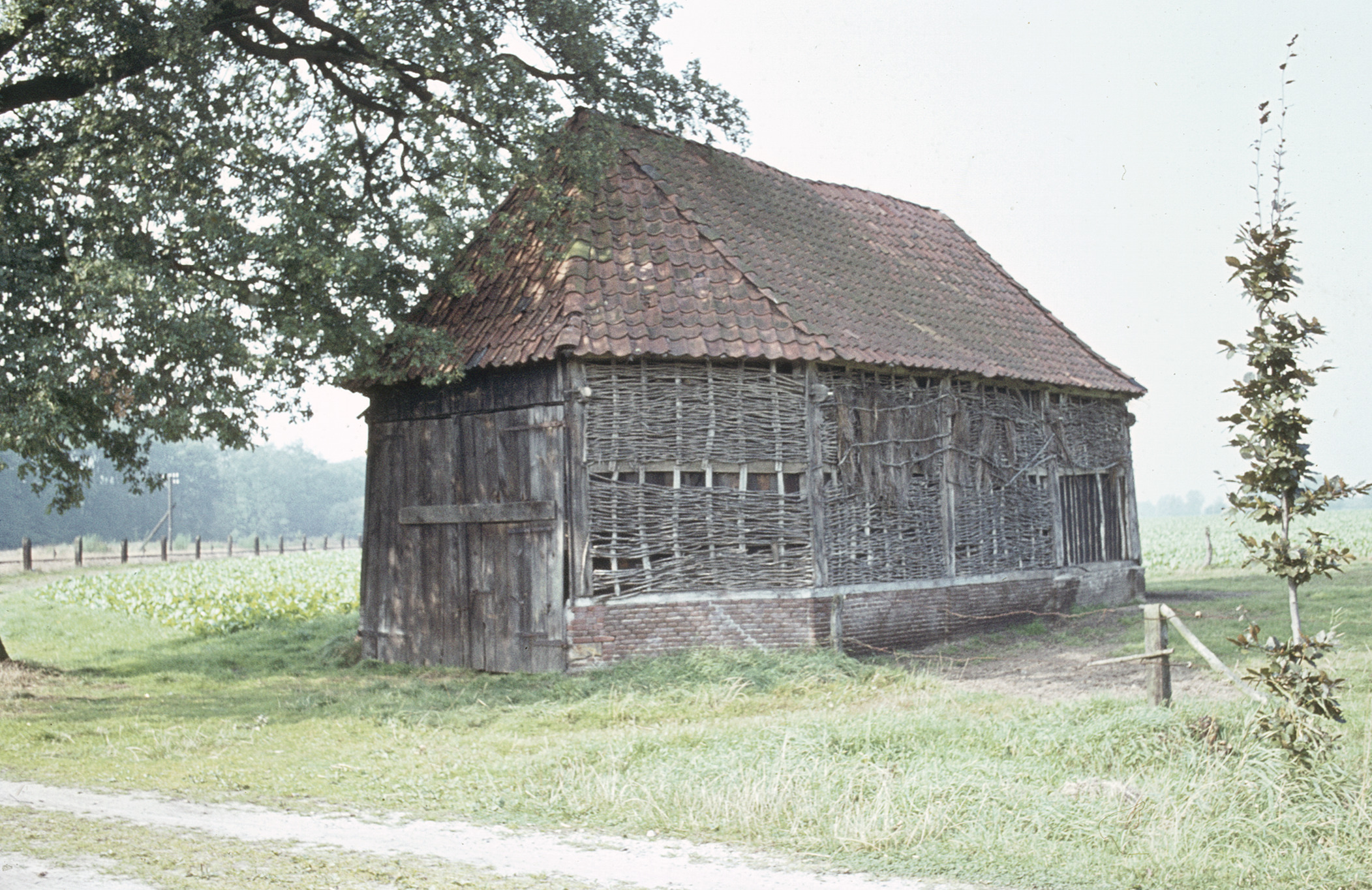
Wattle work walls in a sheep barn in Ruurlo, Netherlands.

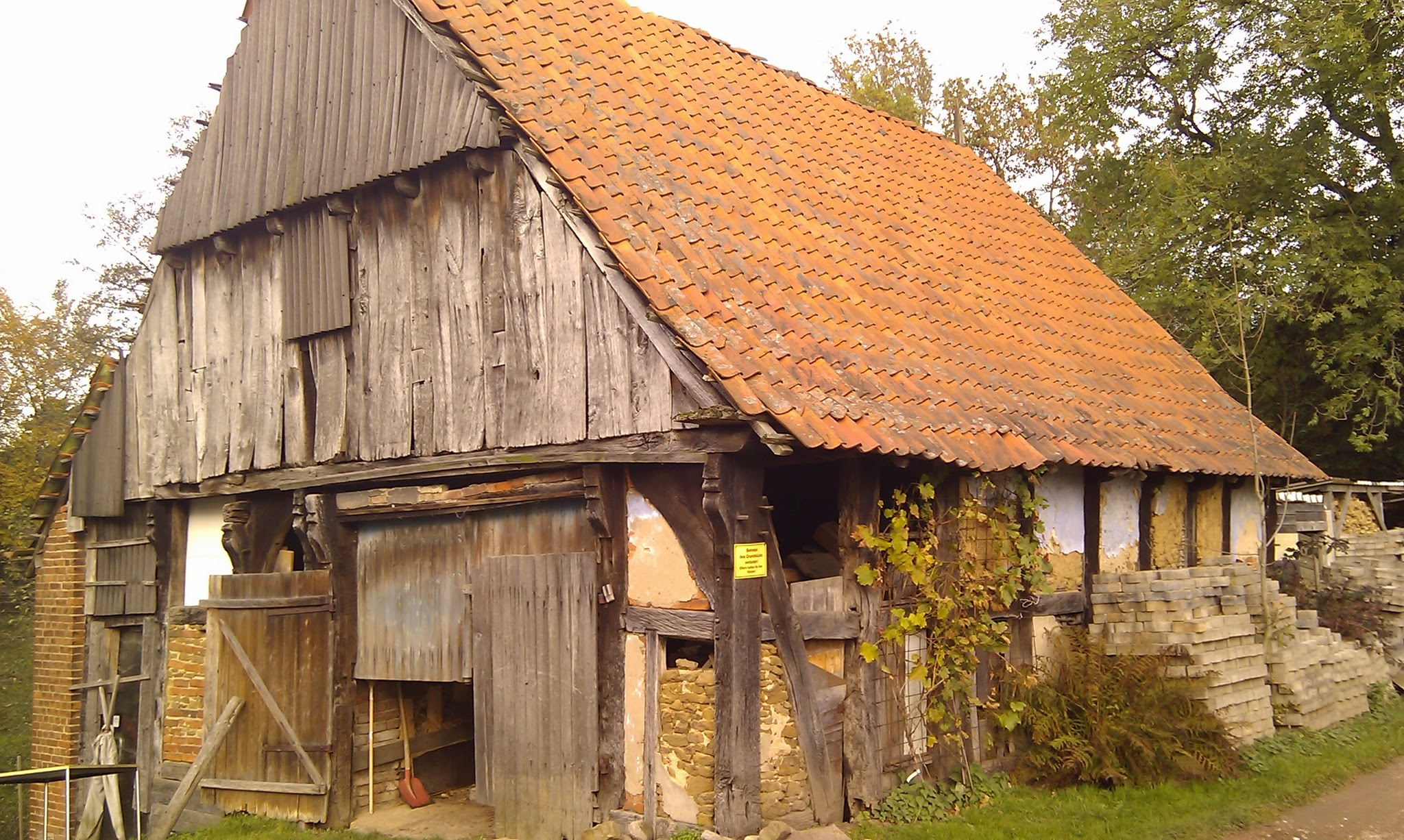
Half-timbered barn walls with stone infill. Rödinghausen, Germany.

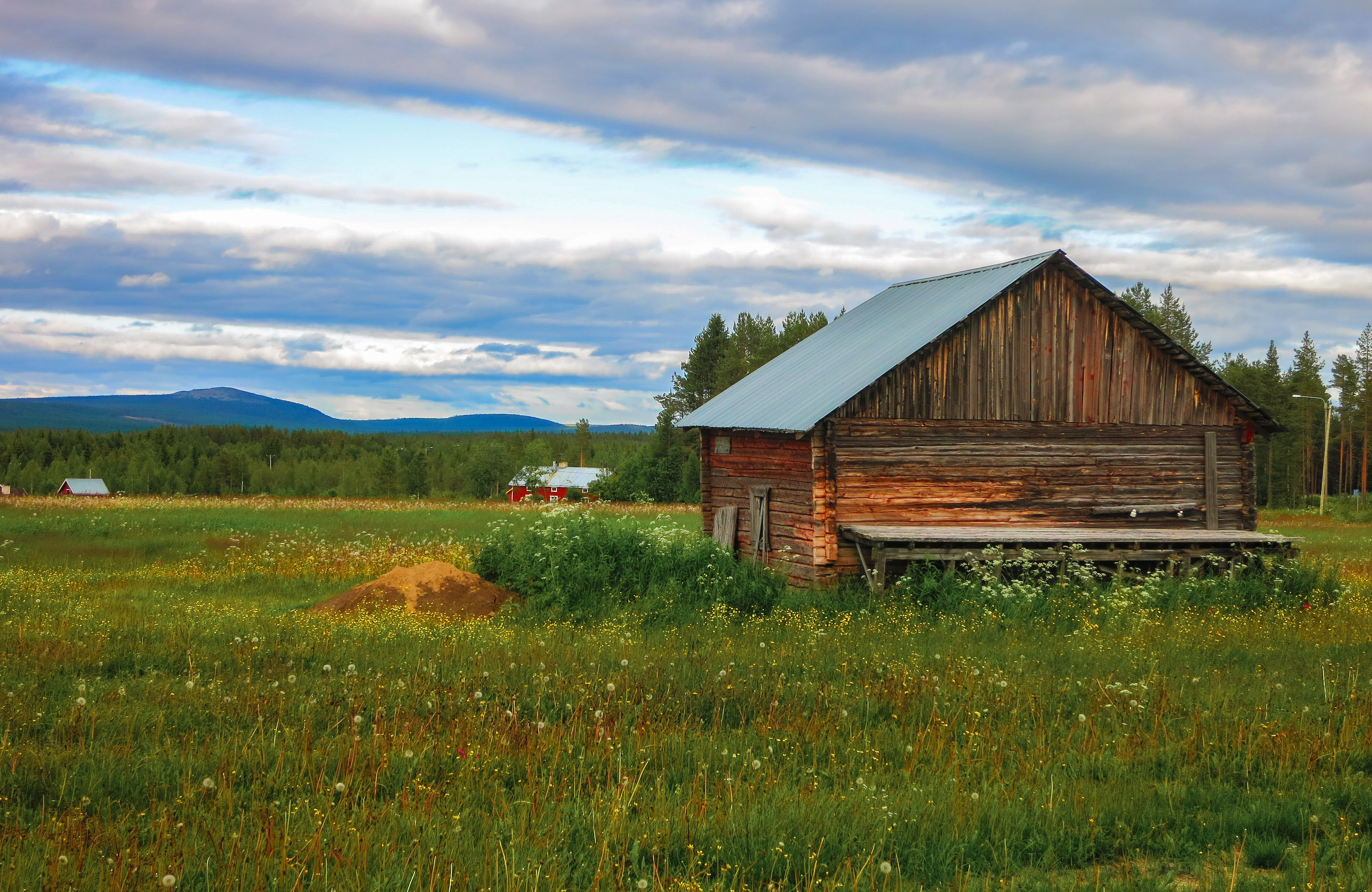
A barn in Orajärvi village of Sodankylä, Lapland, Finland.

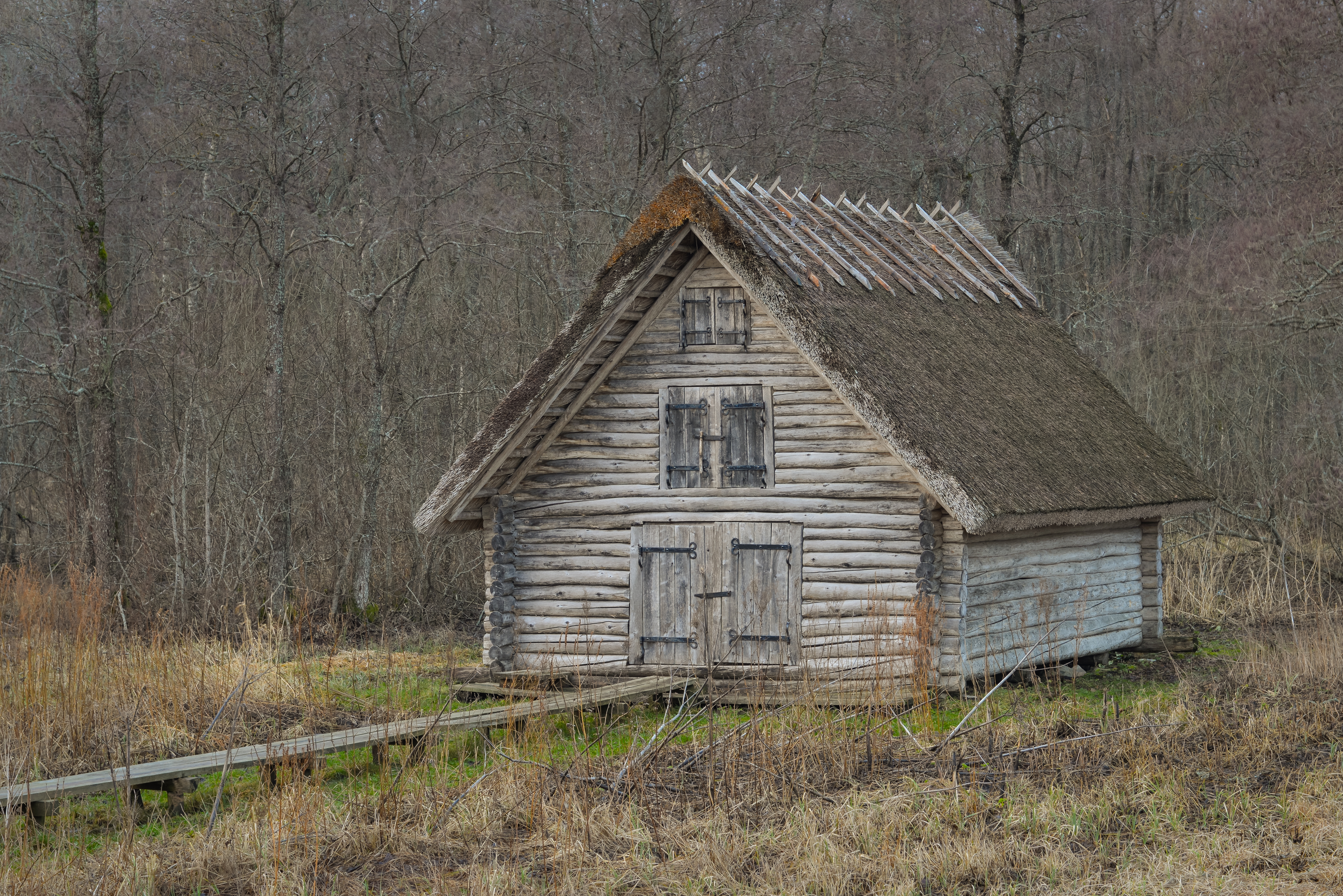
Old hay barn at the end of Suitsu hiking trail at the Matsalu National Park in Pärnu County, Estonia.

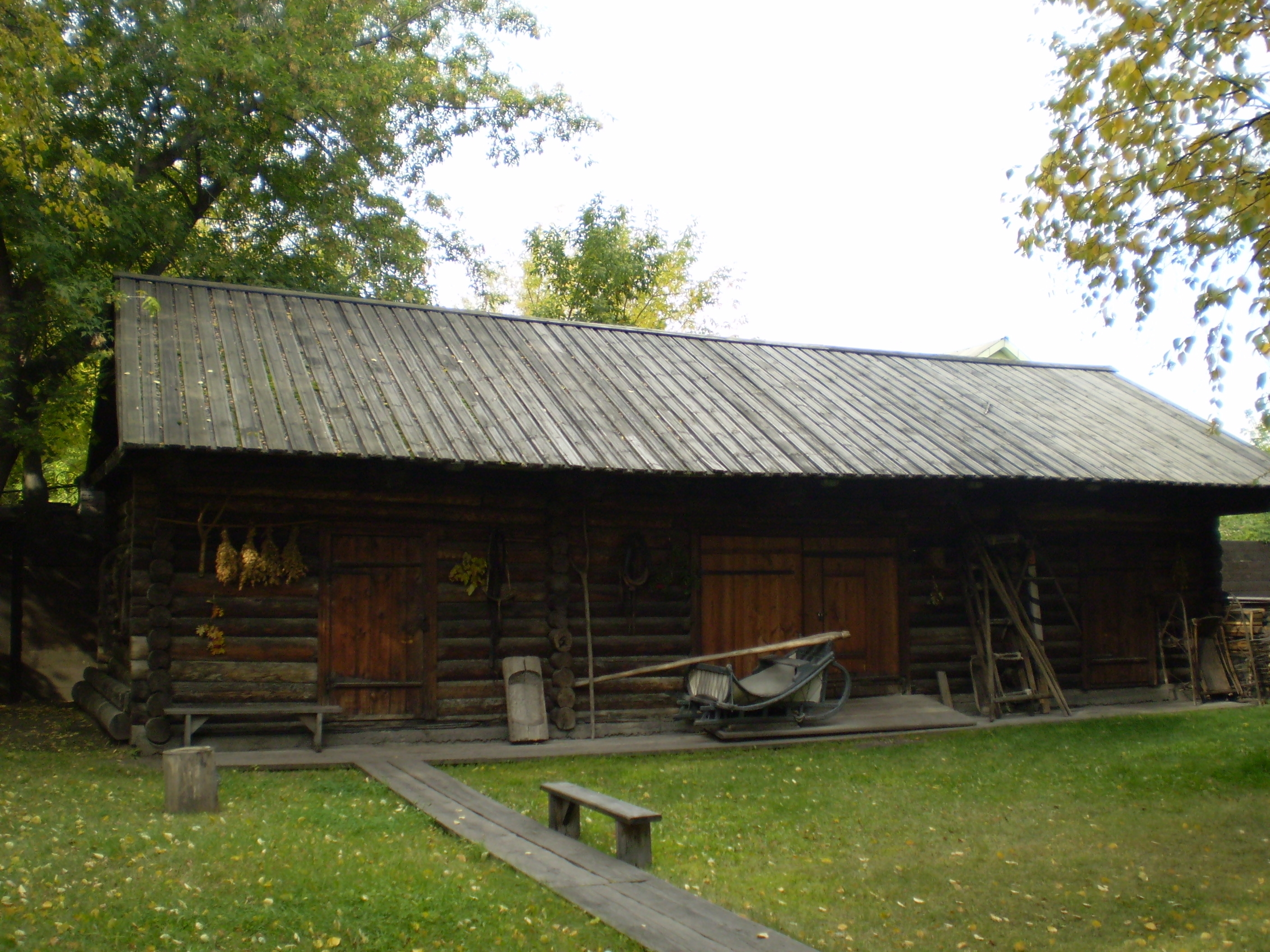
A barn (ovin) in the museum-estate of Surikov. Krasnoyarsk, Russia.

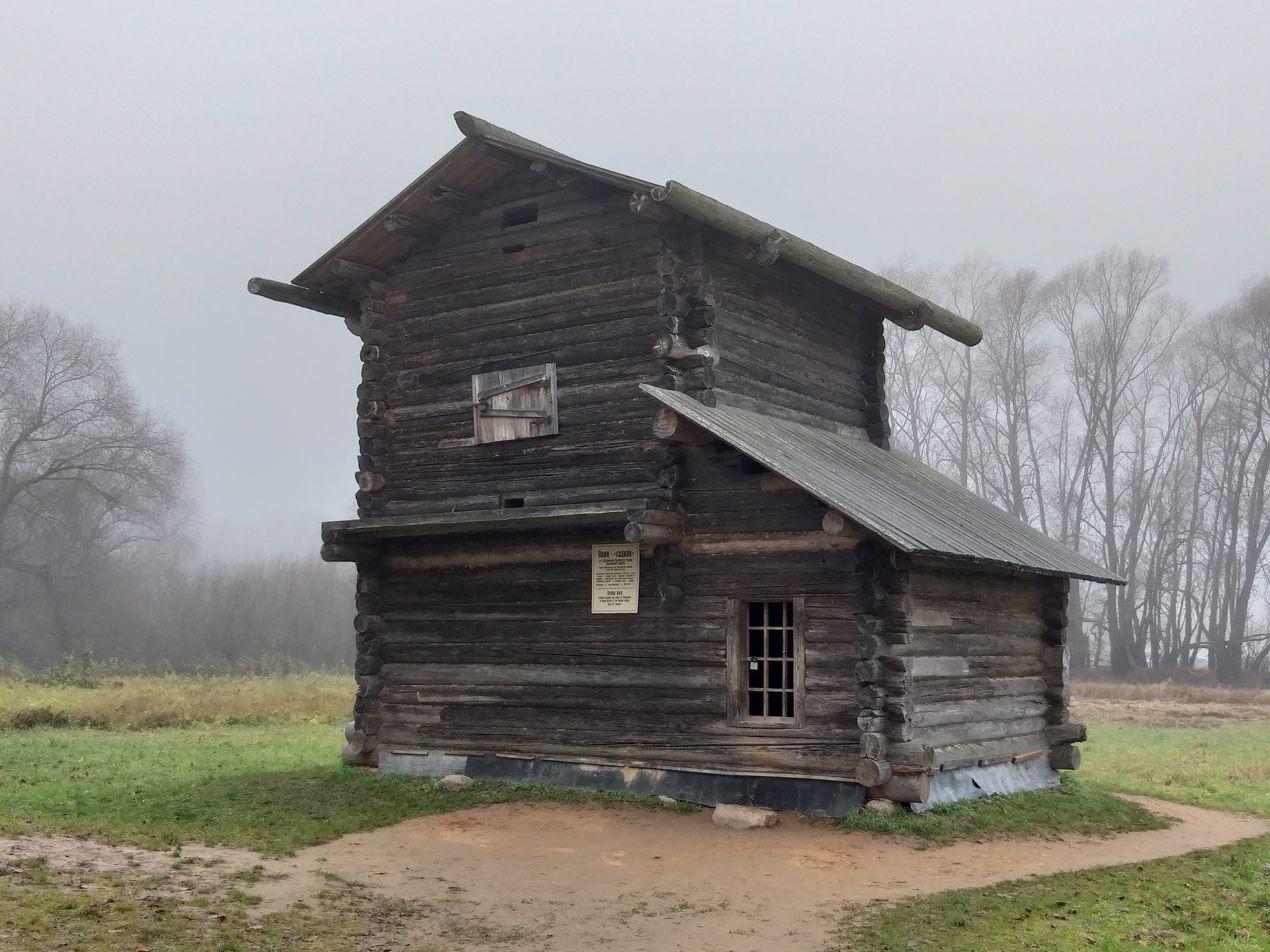
A barn (ovin) from Vakhonkino village, Kaduysky raion, Vologda oblast, Russia. Vitoslavlitsy museum, Veliky Novgorod.

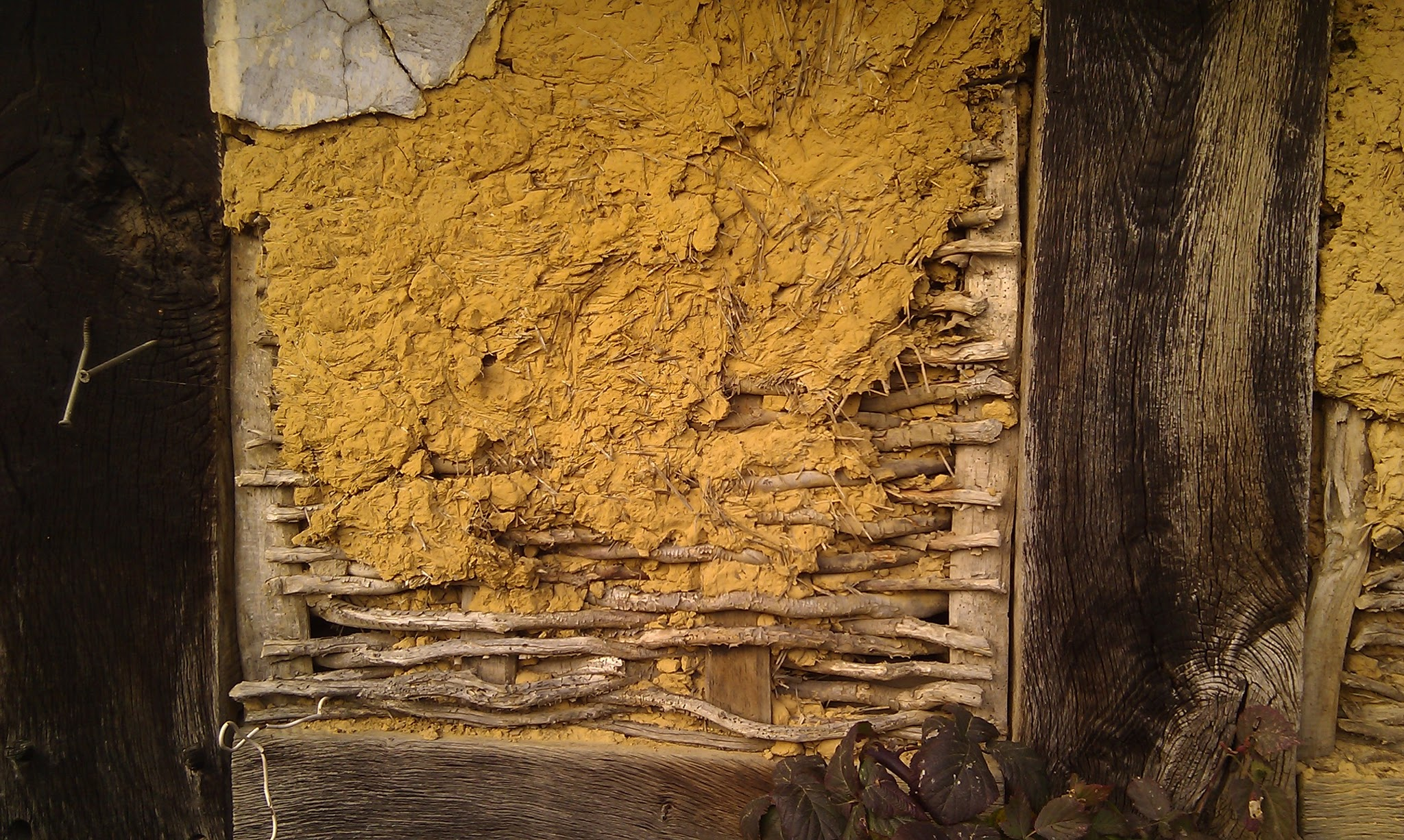
Half-timbered wall with wattle and daub infill. Some of the plaster coating survives. Rödinghausen, Germany.

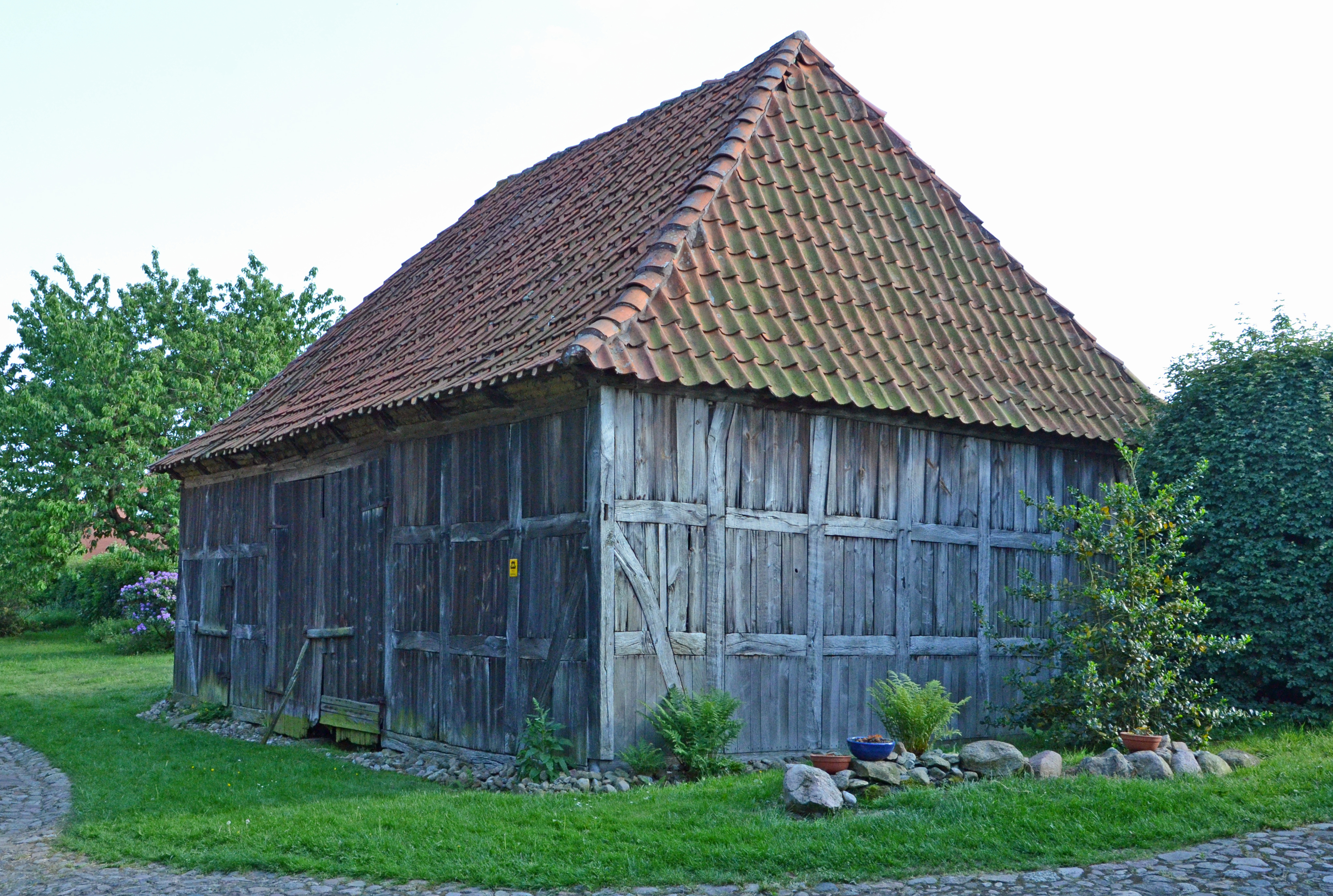
A rare half-timbered barn with board infill in Syke, Lower Saxony, Germany.

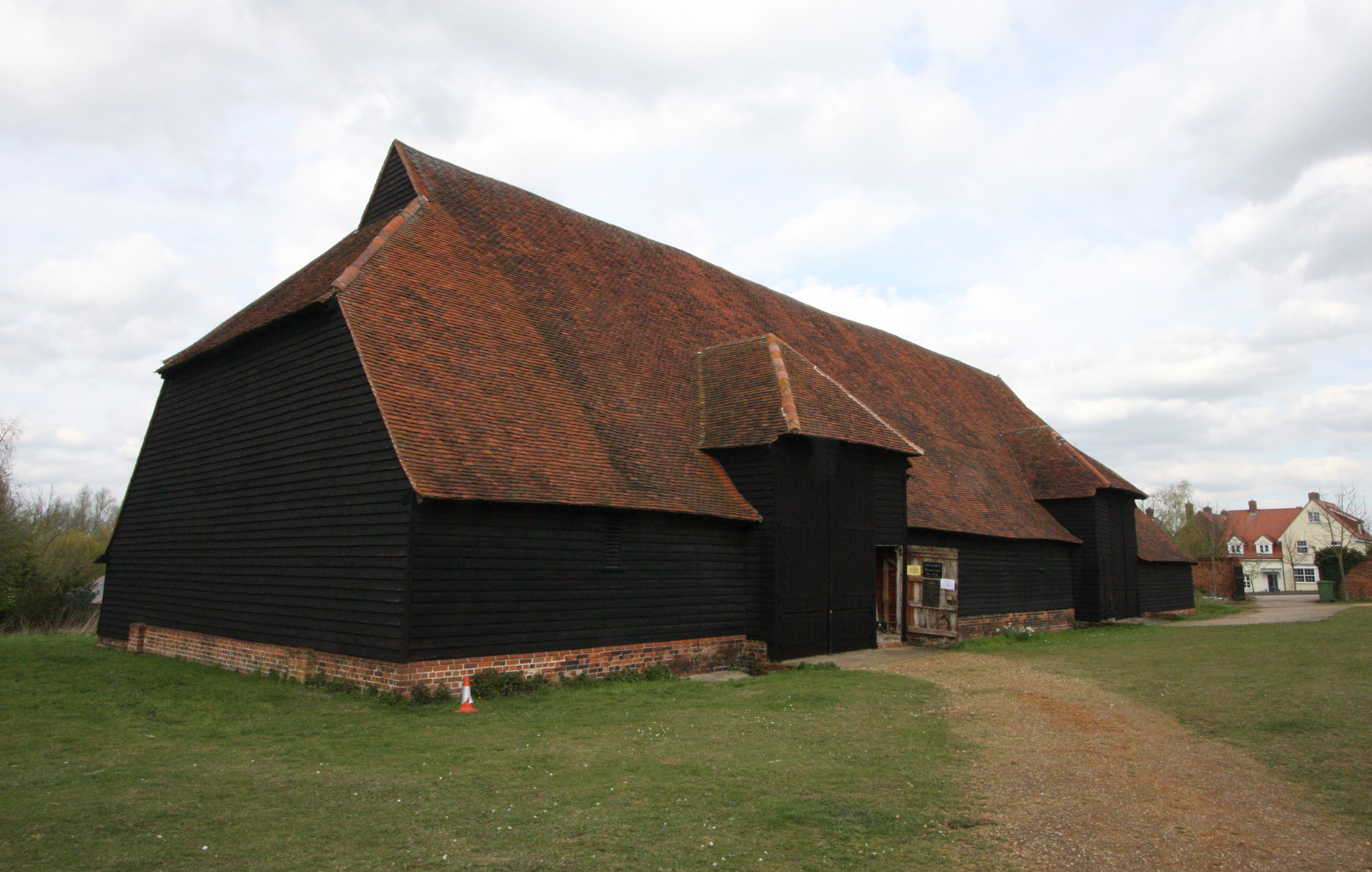
Grange barn, Coggeshall, England. This is a studded barn so the wall sheathing must be applied horizontally and covered with a siding material, in this case clapboards (weatherboards).

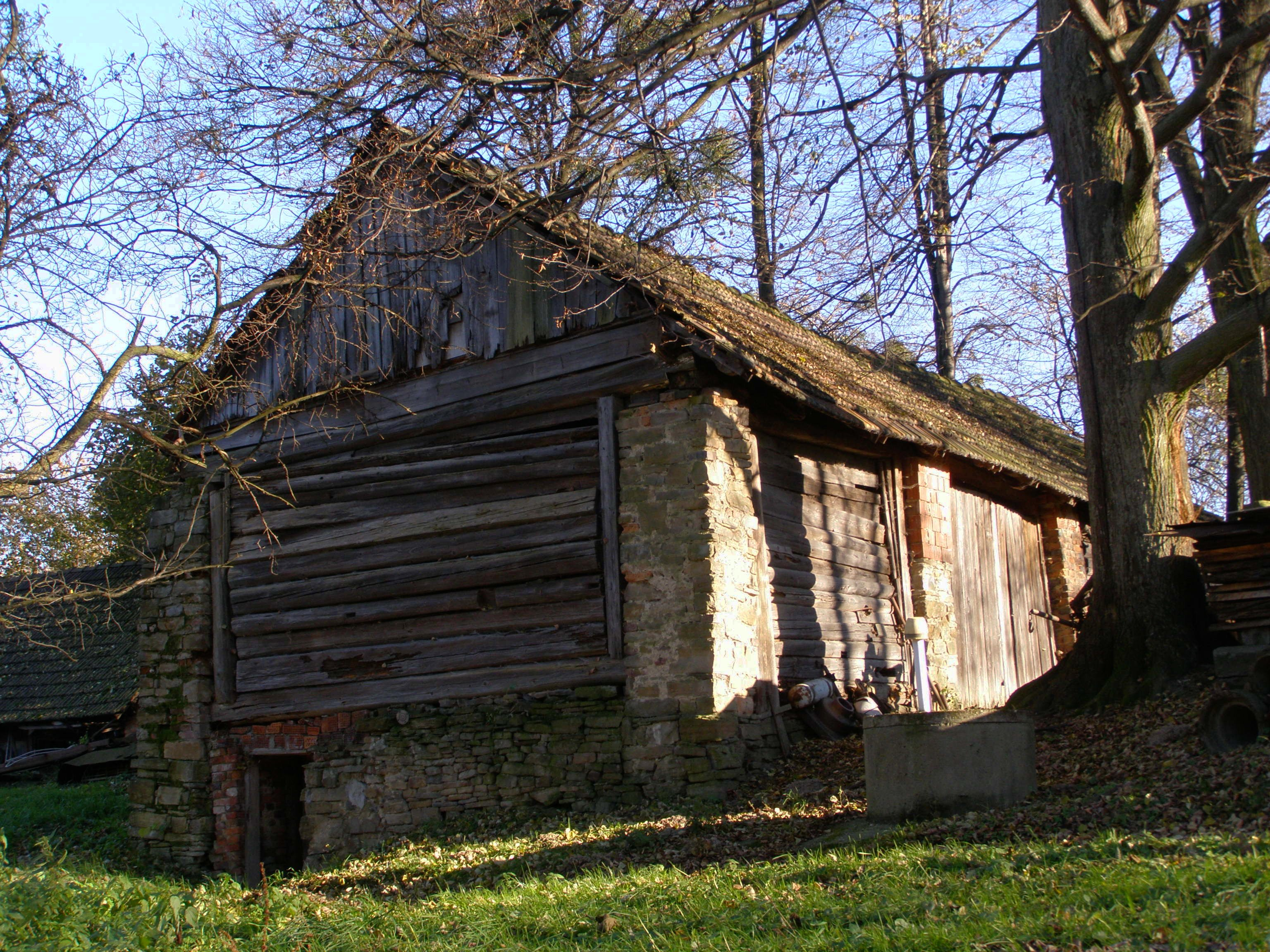
A type of barn in Metylovice, Czech Republic with stone piers and an infill of horizontal timbers.

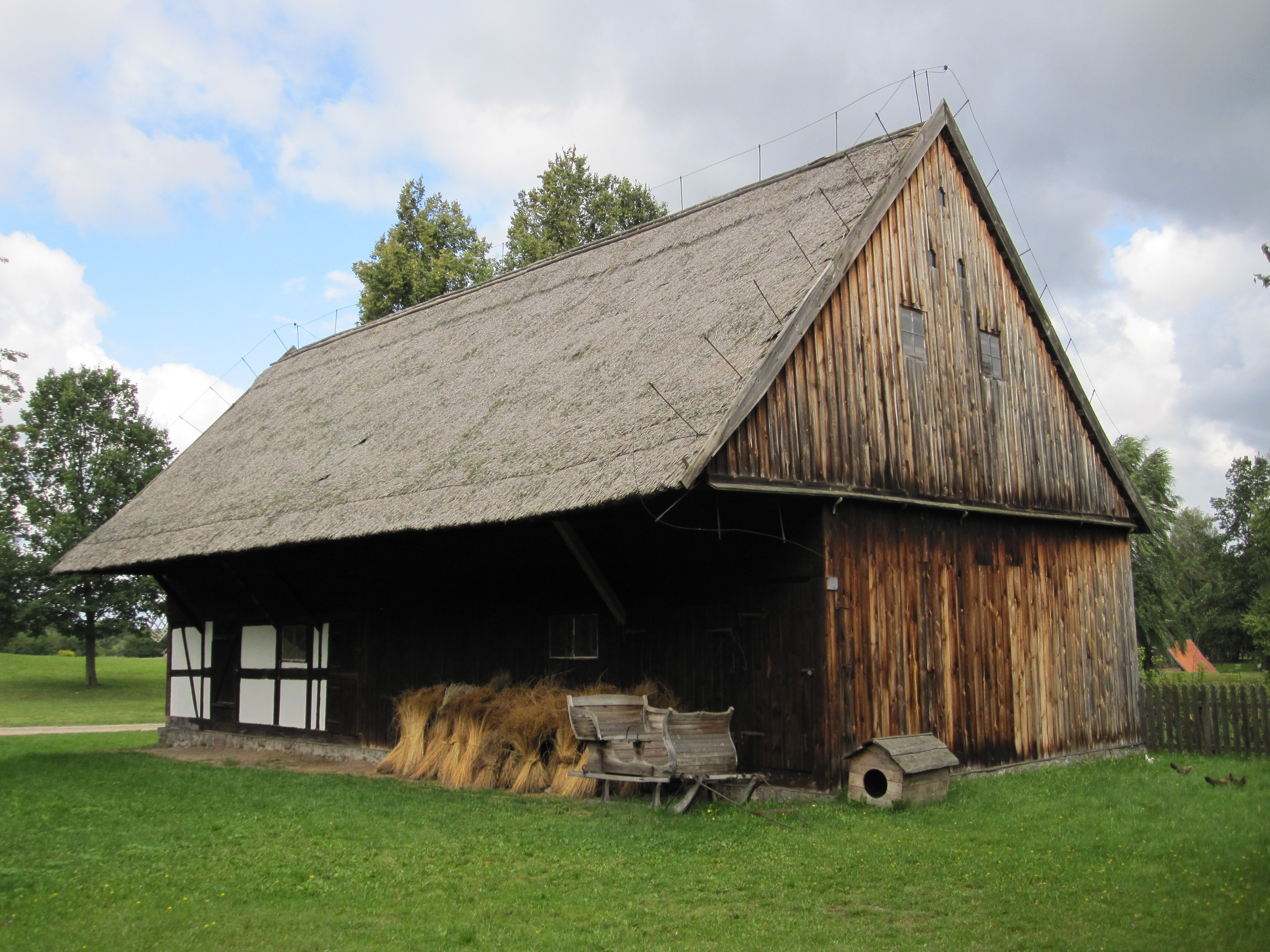
Board-on-board siding and half timber-framed barn in Olsztynek, north Poland

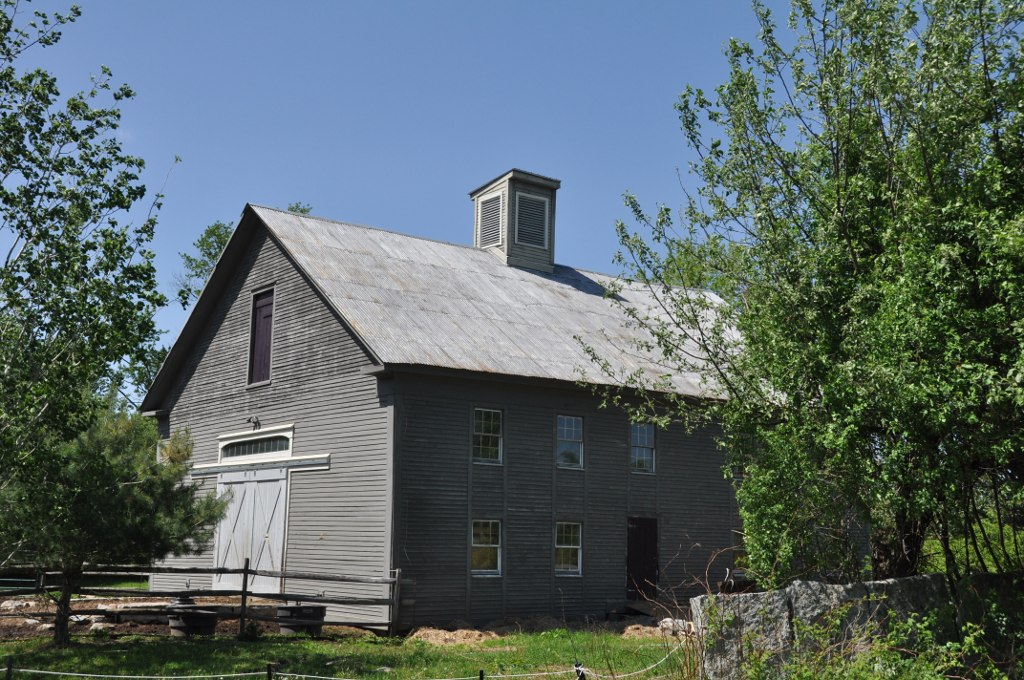
Timber framed with the sheathing covered in clapboards. New Hampshire, U.S.A.

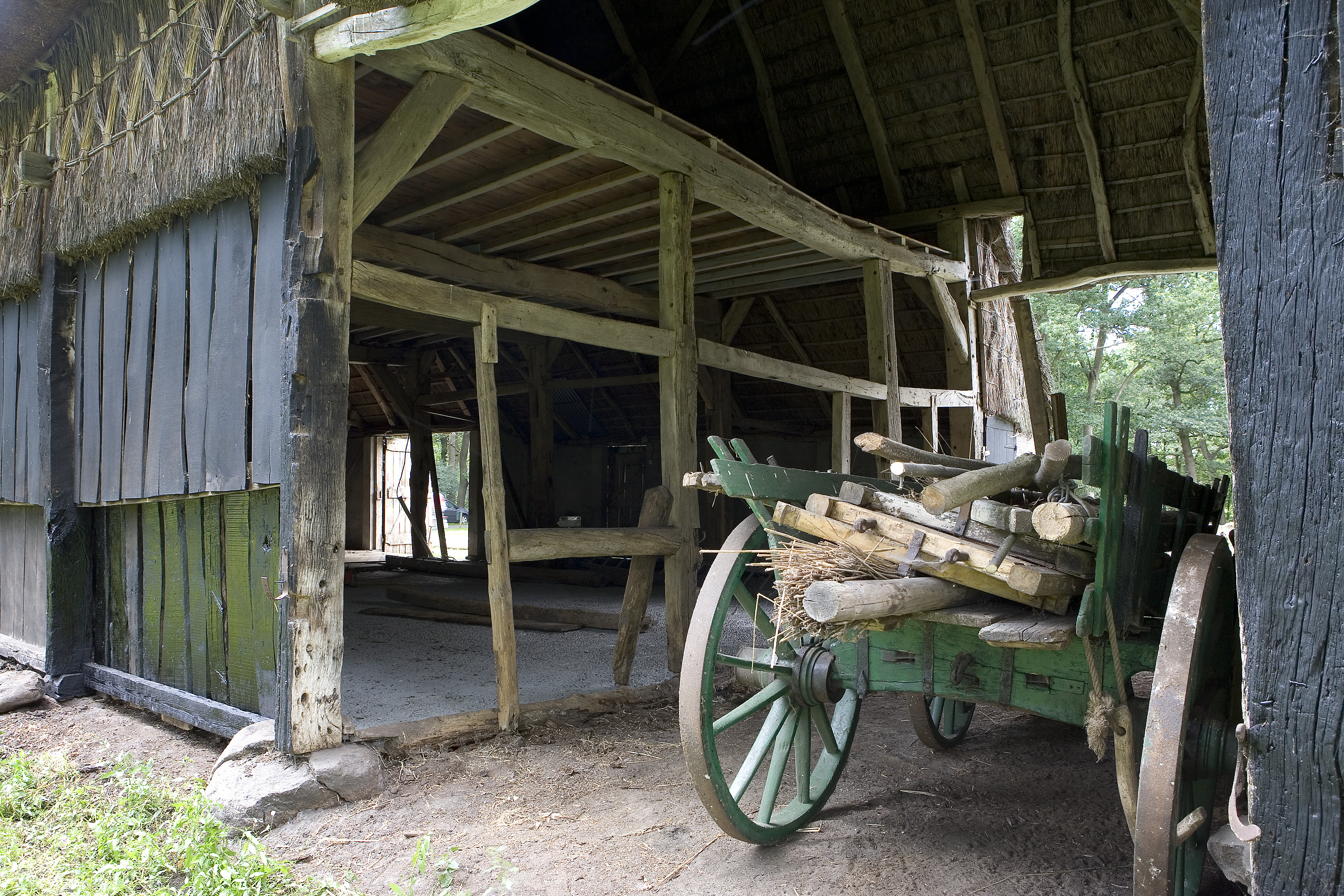
Rare walls of boards and thatch. Drenthe, Netherlands

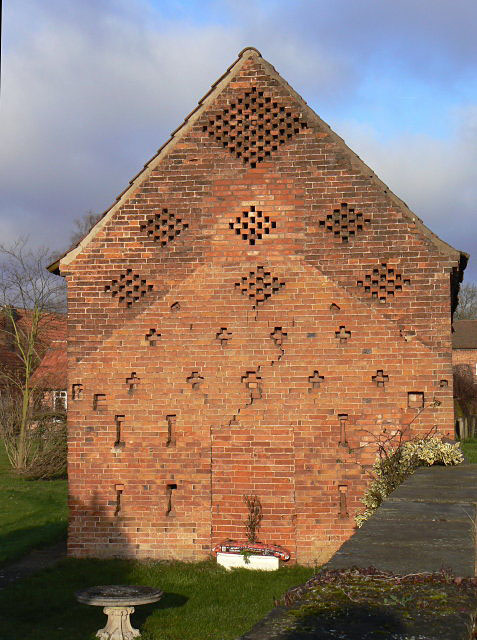
Gable end of a brick barn with ventilation holes built into the brickwork.

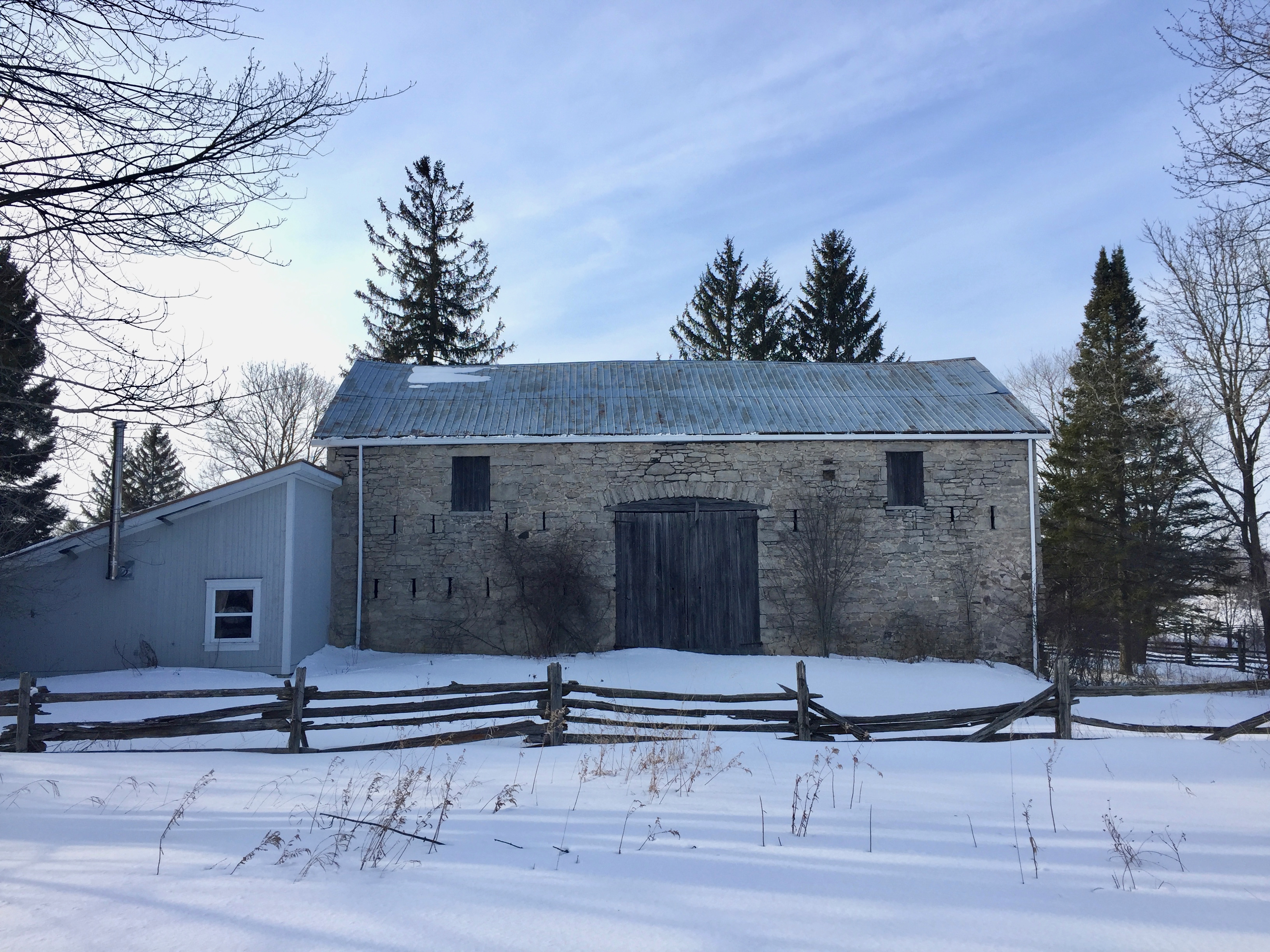
19th-century fieldstone barn near Rockwood, Ontario, Canada.

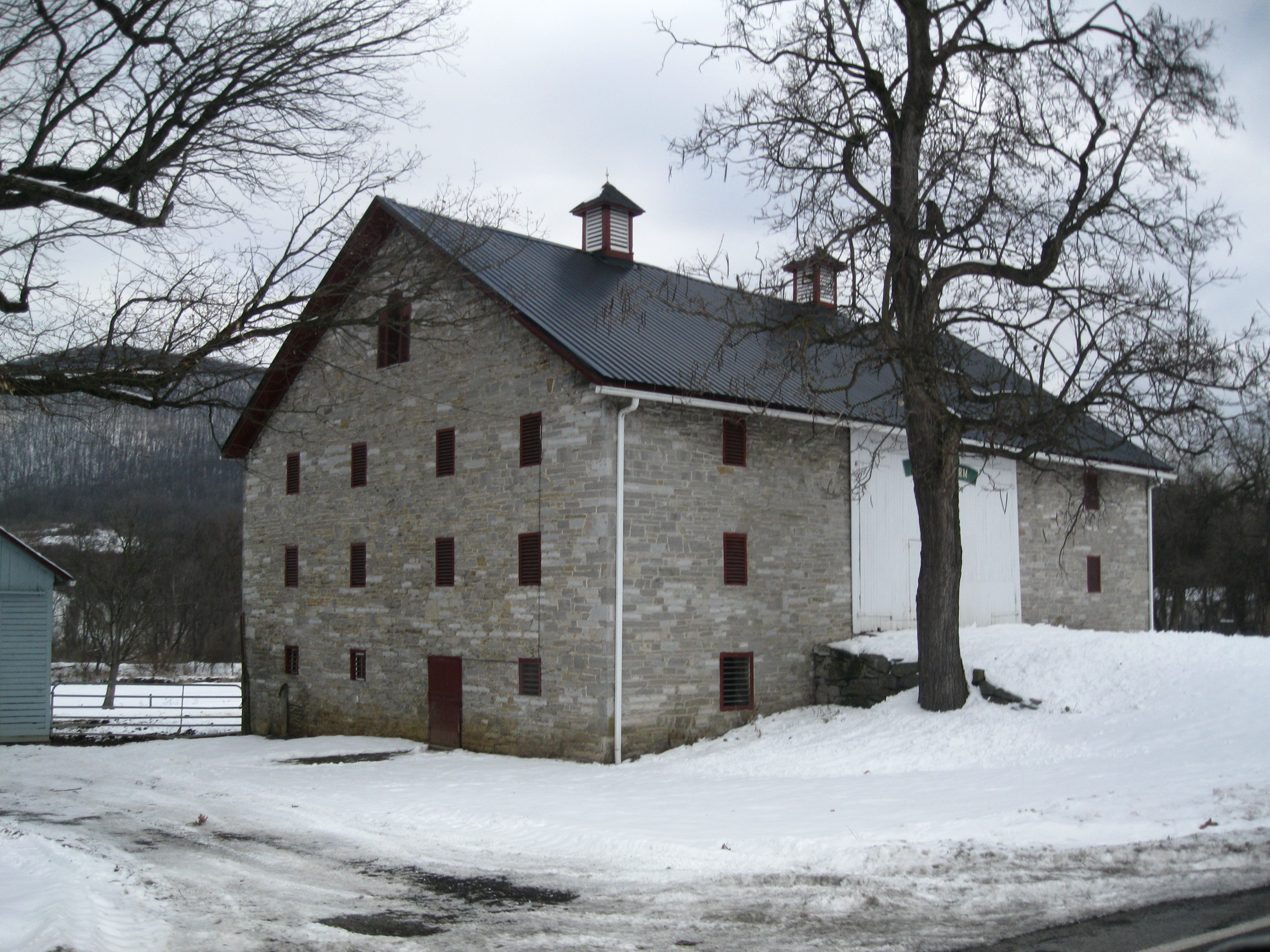
Limestone walls in the Oak Hall Historic District, Pennsylvania, U.S.A.

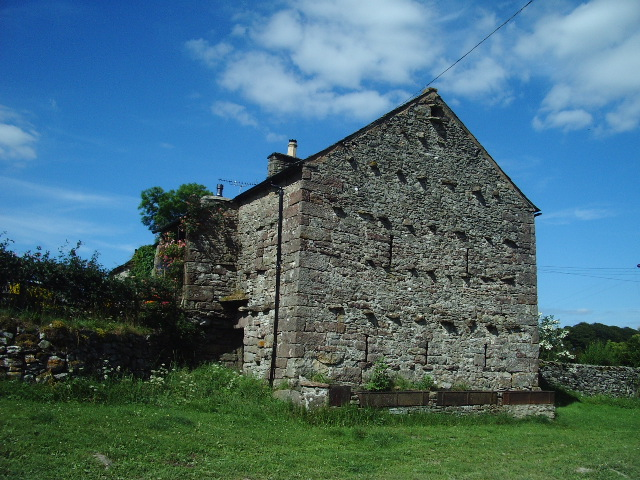
Stone barns are common in parts of the United Kingdom, United States, Canada, France, and some Mediterranean countries. The projecting stones (which are a type of wall tie) are a style in the Yorkshire Dales, England.

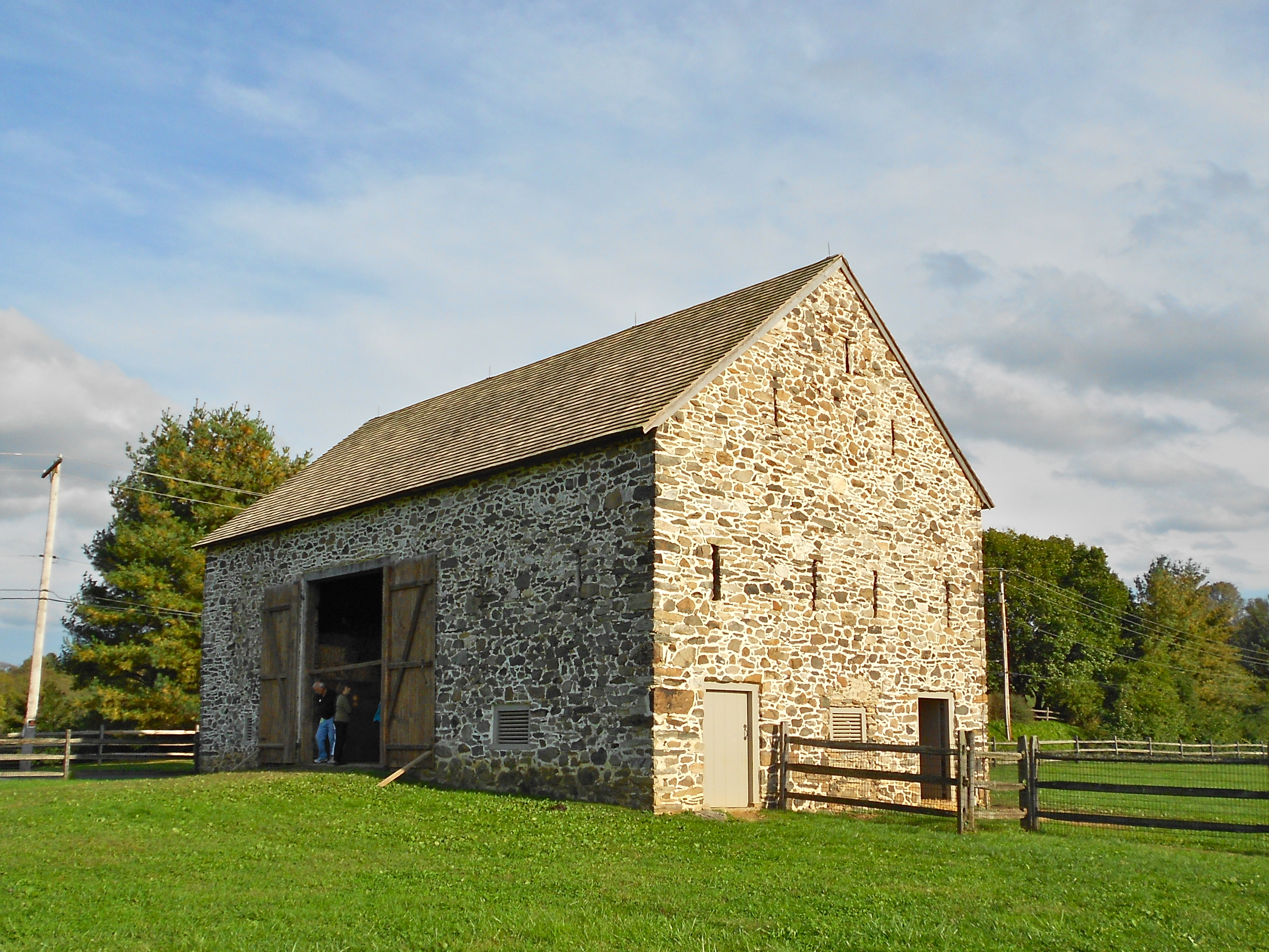
Abidiah Taylor Barn Chester County, Pennsylvania. Part of the Taylor-Cope Historic District. Built in either 1724 (date stone) or 1744 (wooden beam investigation), it is one of the oldest extant barns in the United States. Field stone walls.

The combination of brick quoins with flint walls is common in (mostly older) buildings in this area of the Chilterns, Oxfordshire, England.

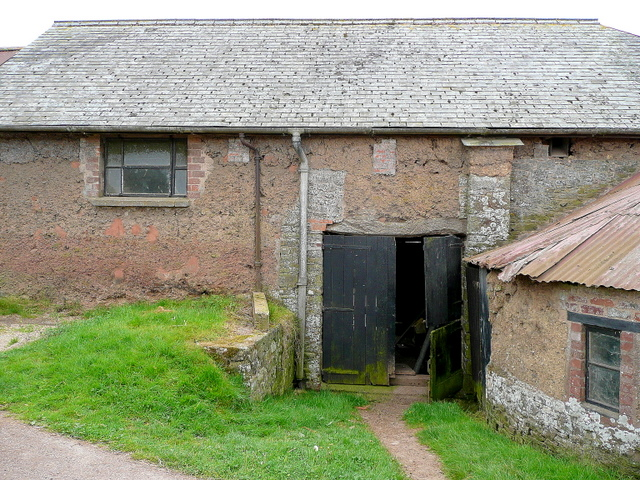
A rare wall material is Cob which is similar to adobe. Devon, England.

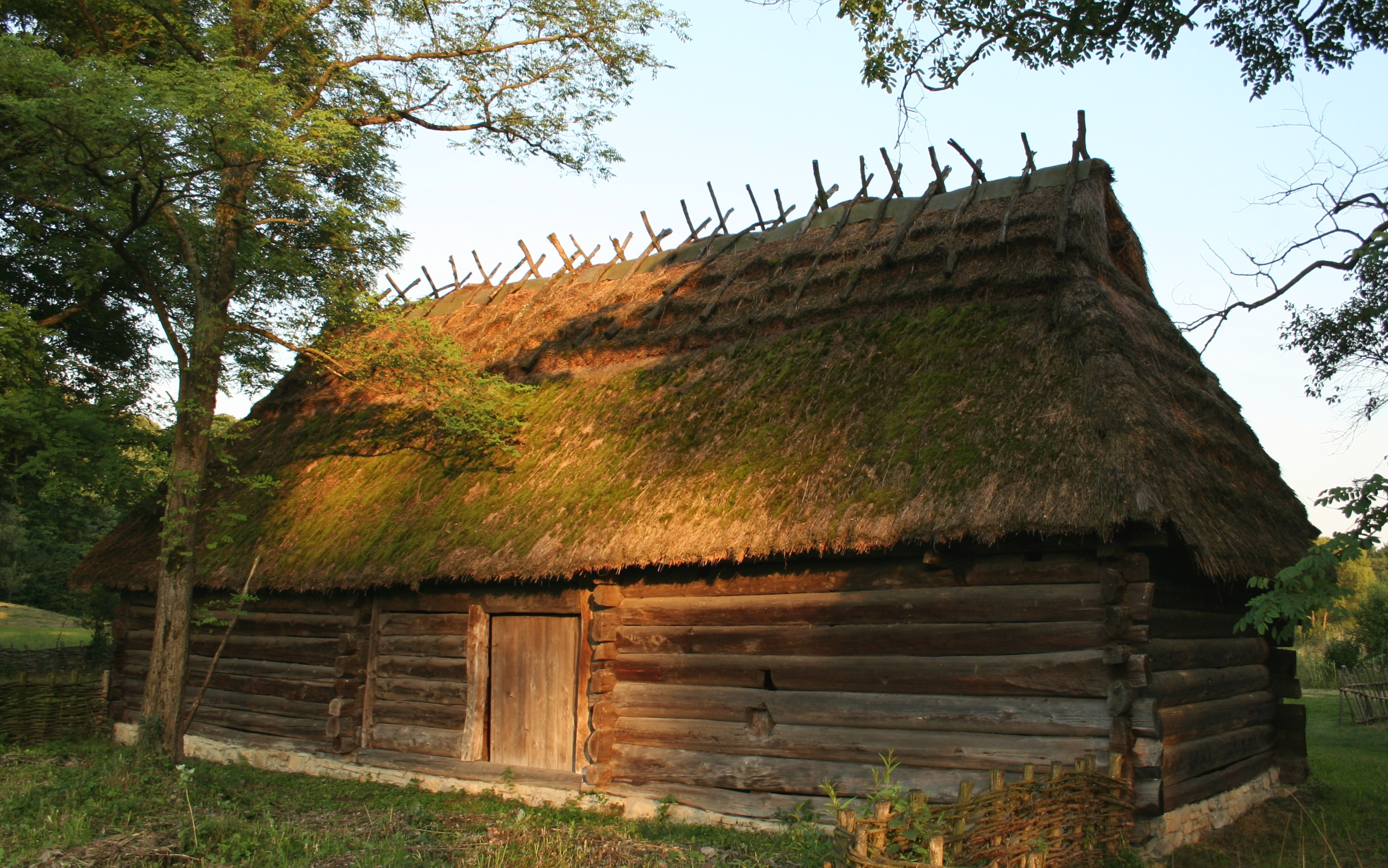
Round log barn in the skansen (open-air museum) in Sanok, Poland

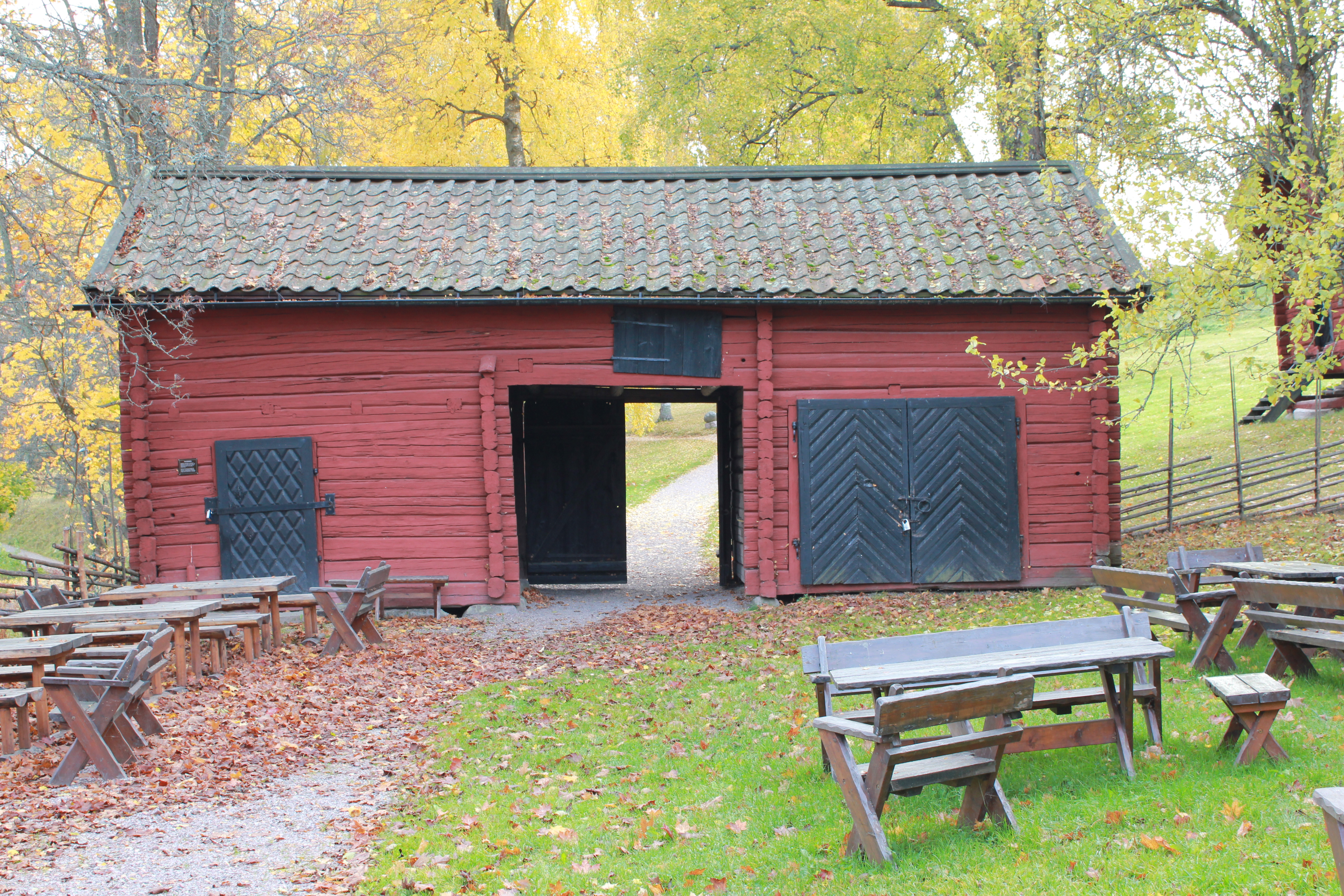
Hewn log barn painted red in Hedemora, Sweden.

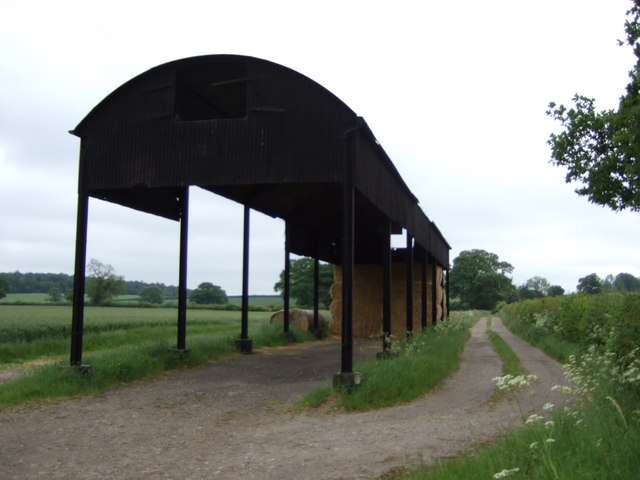
No walls are a characteristic of what in the United Kingdom is called a Dutch barn.

== Uses ==
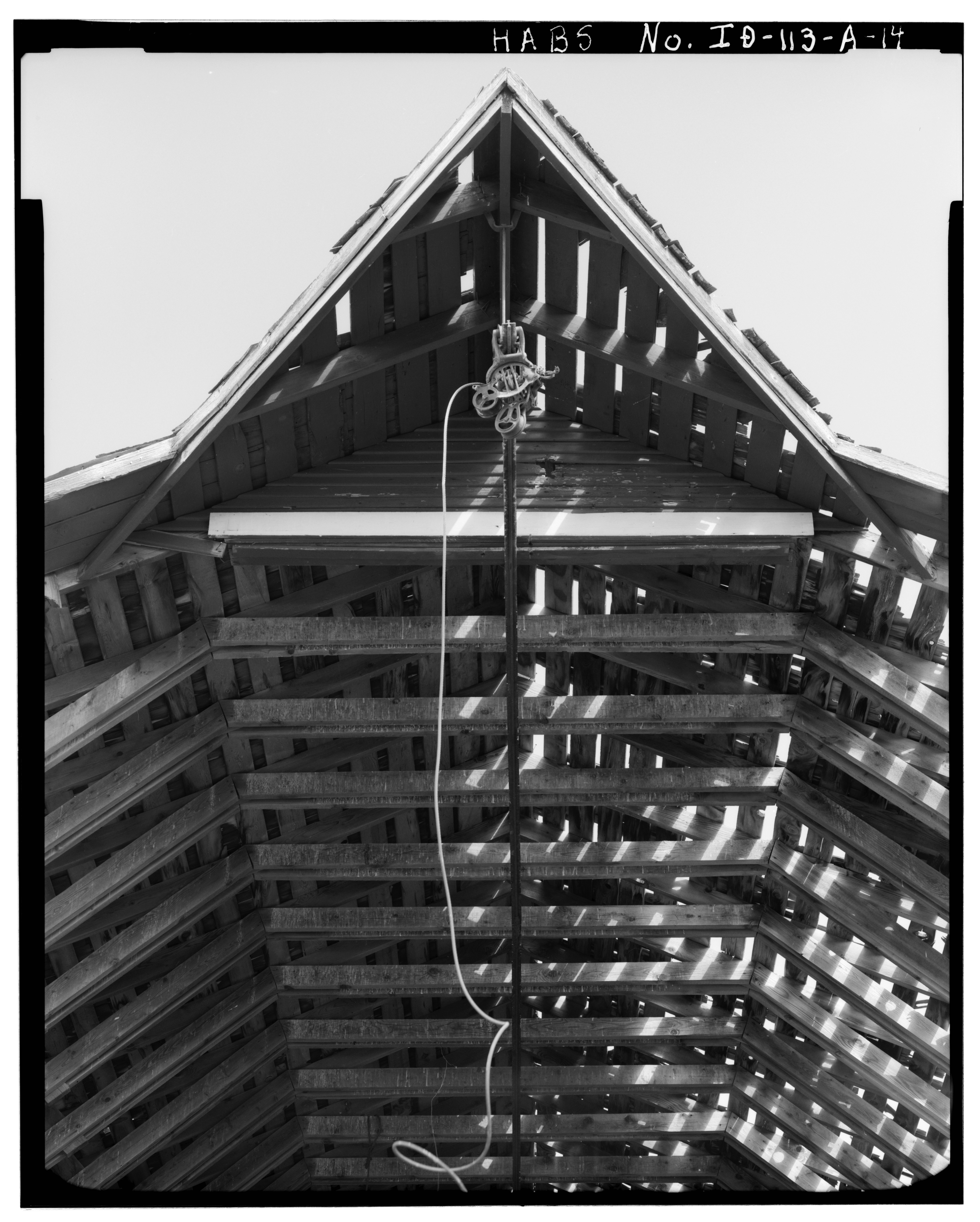
The hay track developed in the early 19th century, here showing how the hay hood (roof extension) covers the track. The gable wall of this barn is missing.

In older style North American barns, the upper area was used to store hay and sometimes grain. This is called the mow (rhymes with cow) or the hayloft. A large door at the top of the ends of the barn could be opened up so that hay could be put in the loft. The hay was hoisted into the barn by a system containing pulleys and a trolley that ran along a track attached to the top ridge of the barn. Trap doors in the floor allowed animal feed to be dropped into the mangers for the animals.

In New England it is common to find barns attached to the main farmhouse (connected farm architecture), allowing for chores to be done while sheltering the worker from the weather.

In the middle of the twentieth century the large broad roof of barns were sometimes painted with slogans in the United States. Most common of these were the 900 barns painted with ads for Rock City.

In the past barns were often used for communal gatherings, such as barn dances.

== Features ==
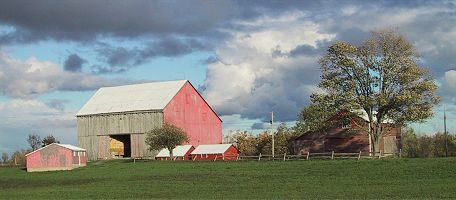
A barn in southern Ontario, Canada

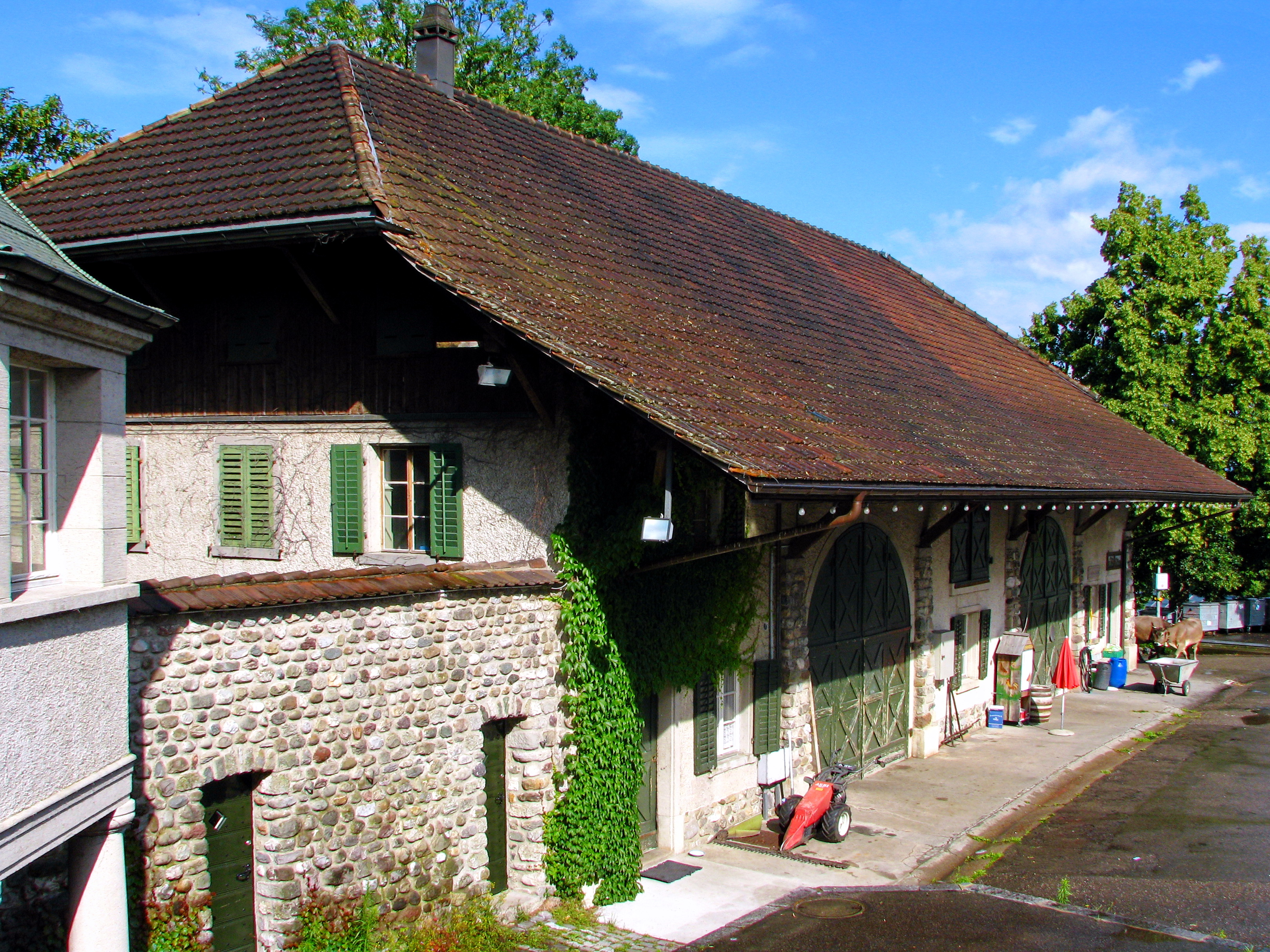
A barn of the Uster castle in the city of Uster, Switzerland

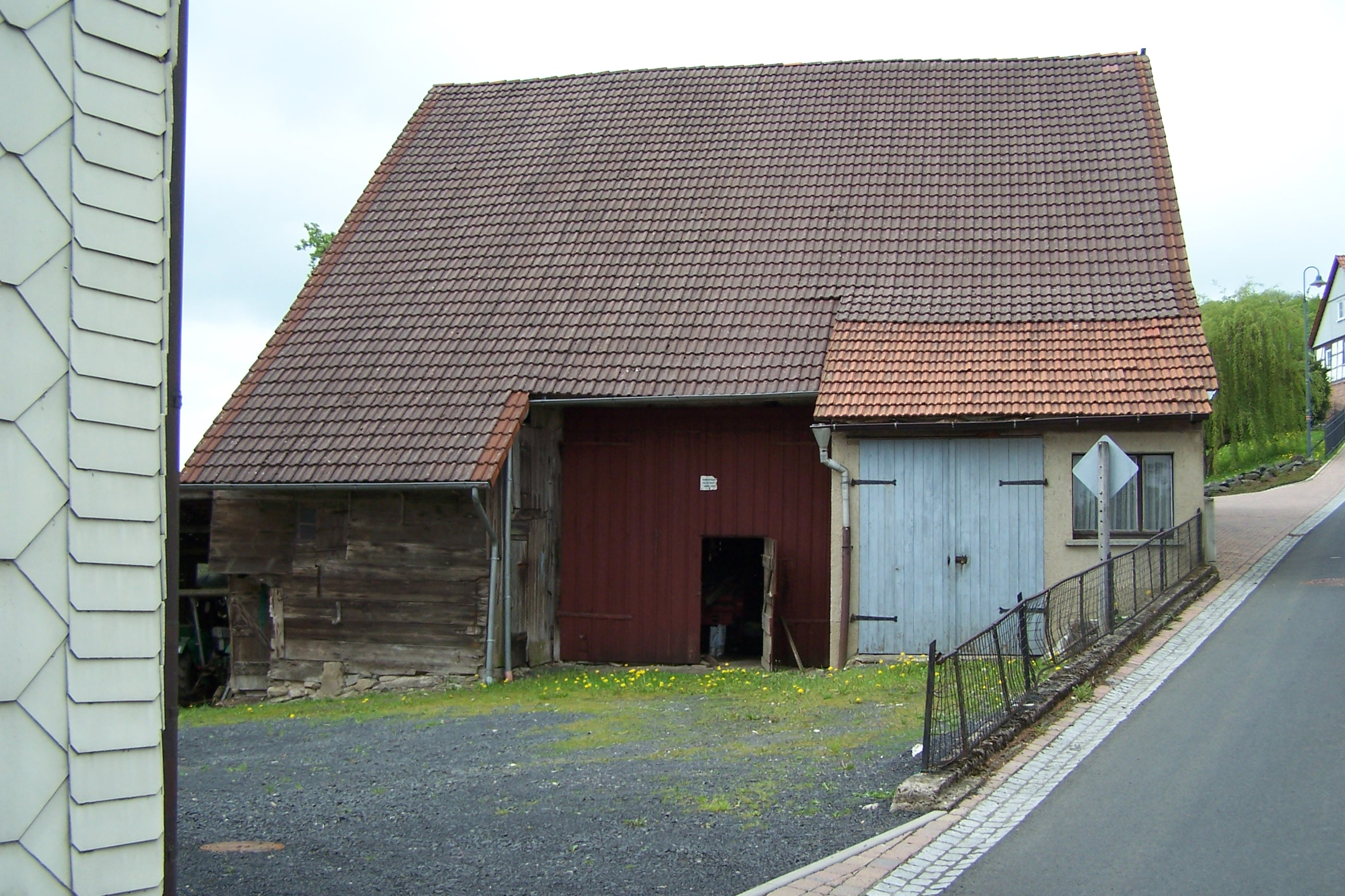
This barn in Thuringia, Germany has two outshots forming the recess to the middle barn doors.

A farm may have buildings of varying shapes and sizes used to shelter large and small animals and other uses. The enclosed pens used to shelter large animals are called stalls and may be located in the cellar or on the main level depending in the type of barn. Other common areas, or features, of an American barn include:

- a tack room (where bridles, saddles, etc. are kept), often set up as a breakroom
- a feed room, where animal feed is stored – not typically part of a modern barn where feed bales are piled in a stackyard
- a drive bay, a wide corridor for animals or machinery
- a silo where fermented grain or hay (called ensilage or haylage) is stored.
- a milkhouse for dairy barns; an attached structure where the milk is collected and stored prior to shipment
- a grain (soy, corn, etc.) bin for dairy barns, found in the mow and usually made of wood with a chute to the ground floor providing access to the grain, making it easier to feed the cows.
- modern barns often contain an indoor corral with a squeeze chute for providing veterinary treatment to sick animals.
- In North Yorkshire cowhouses would have a muck hole (muck’ole in the local dialect) to allow manure to be deposited outside the barn without the cowhand leaving the building.
- In North Yorkshire a cowhouse would have a small door or forking hole (forking’ole in the local dialect) high up on the wall to enable fodder to be 'forked' into the baux or baulks (hayloft).
- Some English barns would have a gin gang, a semi-circular extension added to house a horse engine.

== Derivatives ==
The physics term "barn", which is a subatomic unit of area, 10^{−28} m^{2}, came from experiments with uranium nuclei during World War II, wherein they were described colloquially as "big as a barn", with the measurement officially adopted to maintain security around nuclear weapons research.

== Barn idioms ==
- "He couldn't hit the broad side of a barn" is a popular expression for a person having poor aim when throwing an object or when shooting at something.
- To "lock the barn door after the horse has bolted" implies that one has solved a problem too late to prevent it.
- "Were you born/raised in a barn?" is an accusation used differently in various parts of the English-speaking world, but most commonly as a reprimand when someone exhibits poor manners by either using ill-mannered language (particularly if related to manure), or leaving doors open.
- "Your barn door is open" is used as a euphemism to remind someone to zip the fly of their trousers.
- To "barnstorm" is to travel quickly around a large area making frequent public appearances. See also the practice of barnstorming, a form of stunt flying popular in the early 20th century often organized or hosted close to a local barn.

== Types ==
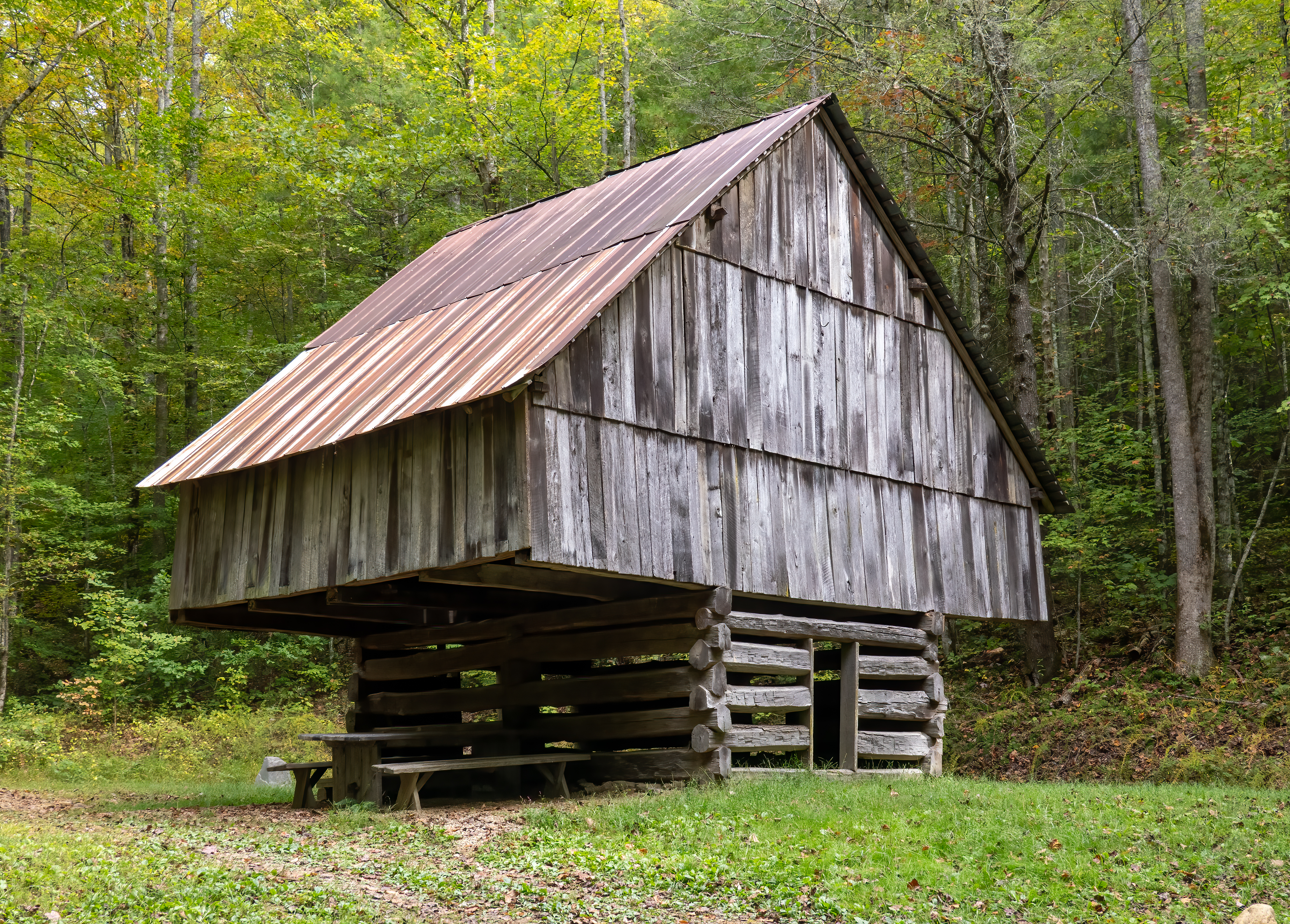
Cantilever barn in Tennessee

Barns have been classified by their function, structure, location, or other features. Sometimes the same building falls into multiple categories.

- Apple barn or fruit barn – for the storage of fruit crops
- Bank barn – A multilevel building built into a banking so the upper floor is accessible to a wagon, sometimes accessed by a bridge or ramp.
- Bastle house – a defensive structure to guard against raiders with accommodation on the lower floor for livestock.
- Bridge barn or covered bridge barn – general terms for barns accessed by a bridge rather than a ramp.
- Boô – A sheep-barn and dwelling in the Netherlands, seasonal or sometimes year round.
- Pennsylvania barn (U.S.) of which there are sub-categories such as standard and sweitzer types. Also known as forebay or porch barns.
- Cantilever barn – a type of log crib barn with cantilevered upper floors which developed in Appalachia (U.S.A.)
- Combination barn – found throughout England, especially in areas of pastoral farming and the standard barn type in America. This general term means the barns were used for both crop storage and as a byre to house animals.
- Crib barn – Horizontal log structures with up to four cribs (assemblies of crossing timbers) found primarily in the southern U.S.A.
- Drying barns for drying crops in Finland and Sweden are called riihi and ria, respectively.
- New World Dutch Barn – A barn type in the U.S. Also see Dutch barn (U.K.) in Other farm buildings section below.
- Field barn – An outbuilding located in a field further afield than the main cluster of buildings that constitute a farmstead
- New England barn – a common style of barn found in rural New England and in the U.S.
- English barn (U.S.), also called a Yankee or Connecticut barn – A widespread barn type in the U.S.
- Granary – to store grain after it is threshed, some barns contain a room called a granary, some barns like a rice barn blur the line between a barn and granary.
- Gothic arch barn, has profile shaped as a Gothic arch, which became feasible to be formed by laminated members
- Ground stable barn, a barn with space for livestock at ground level
- Housebarn, also called a byre-dwelling – A combined living space and barn, relatively common in old Europe but rare in North America. Also, longhouses were housebarns.
- Pole barn – a simple structure that consists of poles embedded in the ground to support a roof, with or without exterior walls. The pole barn lacks a conventional foundation, thus greatly reducing construction costs. Traditionally used to house livestock, hay or equipment.
- Potato barn or potato house– A semi-subterranean or two-story building for storage of potatoes or sweet potatoes.
- Prairie barn – A general term for barns in the Western U.S.
- Rice barn and the related winnowing barn
- Round barn, built in a round shape the term often is generalized to the include polygonal barn and octagonal barn
- Schapenboet – a traditional agricultural outbuilding found on the island of Texel, in the province of North Holland, the Netherlands. Although schapen means sheep, schapenboeten mainly served as storage spaces for hay, tools, and agricultural equipment.
- Swing beam barn – A rare barn type in part of the U.S. designed for threshing with animals walking around a pole held by a swing beam inside the barn.
- Tobacco barn – for drying of tobacco leaves
- Tithe barn – a type of barn used in much of northern Europe in the Middle Ages for storing the tithes—a tenth of the farm's produce which had to be given to the church
- Threshing barn – built with a threshing floor for the processing and storage of cereals, to keep them in dry conditions. Characterised by large double doors in the centre of one side, a smaller one on the other, and storage for cereal harvest or unprocessed on either side. In England the grain was beaten from the crop by flails and then separated from the husks by winnowing between these doors. The design of these typically remained unchanged between the 12th and 19th centuries. The large doors allow for a horse wagon to be driven through; the smaller ones allow for the sorting of sheep and other stock in the spring and summer.

== Other farm buildings often associated with barns ==
- Carriage house: cart shed
- Dutch barn (U.K.): an open sided structure for hay storage. The type with a movable roof is called a hay barrack in the U.S or a hooiberg (kapberg) in the Netherlands.
- A corn crib a horizontal slatted structure built to allow airflow to dry corn (maize)
- A granary or hórreo: a storage space for threshed grains, sometimes within a barn or as a separate building.
- Linhay (linny, linney, linnies): A shed, often with a lean-to roof but may be a circular linhay to store hay on the first floor with either cattle on the ground floor (cattle linhay), or farm machinery (cart linhay). Characterised by an open front with regularly spaced posts or pillars.
- Milk room or milk house: to store milk.
- Oast houses: an outbuilding used for drying hops as part of the brewing process.
- Shelter sheds: open-fronted structures for stock
- Shippon: a shed which houses oxen and cattle. Has fodder storage above, regularly spaced doors on the yard side, a pitching door or window on the first floor.
- Stable: Usually for housing horses.

== Historic farm buildings ==
Old farm buildings of the countryside contribute to the landscape, and help define the history of the location, i.e. how farming took place in the past, and how the area has been settled throughout the ages. They also can show the agricultural methods, building materials, and skills that were used. Most were built with materials reflecting the local geology of the area. Building methods include earth walling and thatching.

Buildings in stone and brick, roofed with tile or slate, increasingly replaced buildings in clay, timber and thatch from the later 18th century. Metal roofs started to be used from the 1850s. The arrival of canals and railways brought about transportation of building materials over greater distances.

Clues determining their age and historical use can be found from old maps, sale documents, estate plans, and from a visual inspection of the building itself, noting (for example) reused timbers, former floors, partitions, doors and windows.

The arrangement of the buildings within the farmstead can also yield valuable information on the historical farm usage and landscape value. Linear farmsteads were typical of small farms, where there was an advantage to having cattle and fodder within one building, due to the colder climate. Dispersed clusters of unplanned groups were more widespread. Loose courtyard plans built around a yard were associated with bigger farms, whereas carefully laid out courtyard plans designed to minimize waste and labour were built in the latter part of the 18th century.

The barns are typically the oldest and biggest buildings to be found on the farm. Many barns were converted into cow houses and fodder processing and storage buildings after the 1880s. Many barns had owl holes to allow for access by barn owls, encouraged to aid vermin control.

The stable is typically the second-oldest building type on the farm. They were well built and placed near the house due to the value that the horses had as draught animals

Modern granaries were built from the 18th century. Complete granary interiors, with plastered walls and wooden partitioning to grain bins, are very rare.

Longhouses are an ancient building where people and animals used the same entrance. These can still be seen, for example, in North Germany, where the Low Saxon house occurs.

Few interiors of the 19th century cow houses have survived unaltered due to dairy-hygiene regulations in many countries.

Old farm buildings may show the following signs of deterioration: rotting in timber-framed constructions due to damp, cracks in the masonry from movement of the walls, e.g. ground movement, roofing problems (e.g. outward thrust of it, deterioration of purlins and gable ends), foundation problems, penetration of tree roots; lime mortar being washed away due to inadequate weather-protection. Walls made of cob, earth mortars or walls with rubble cores are all highly vulnerable to water penetration, and replacement or covering of breathable materials with cement or damp-proofing materials may trap moisture within the walls.

In England and Wales some of these historical buildings have been given "listed building" status, which provides them some degree of archaeological protection.

Some grant schemes are available to restore Historic Farmland buildings, for example Natural England's Environmental Stewardship, Countryside Stewardship and Environmentally Sensitive Areas Schemes.

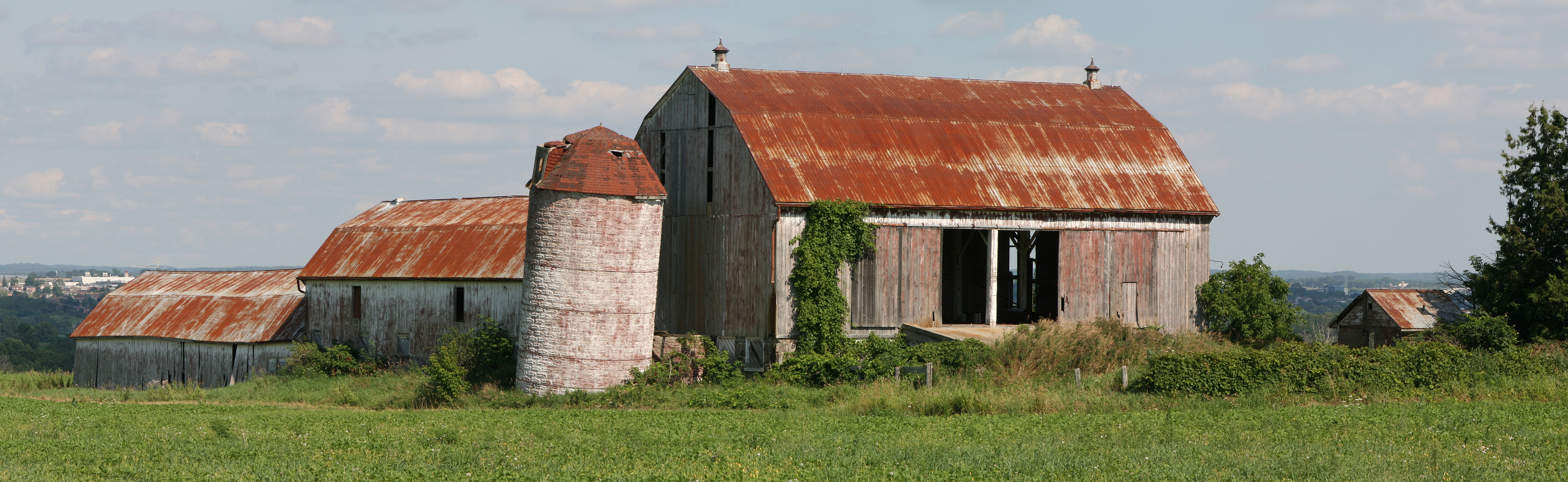
Barns and silo in Newmarket, Ontario, Canada. These structures were torn down in March 2009.

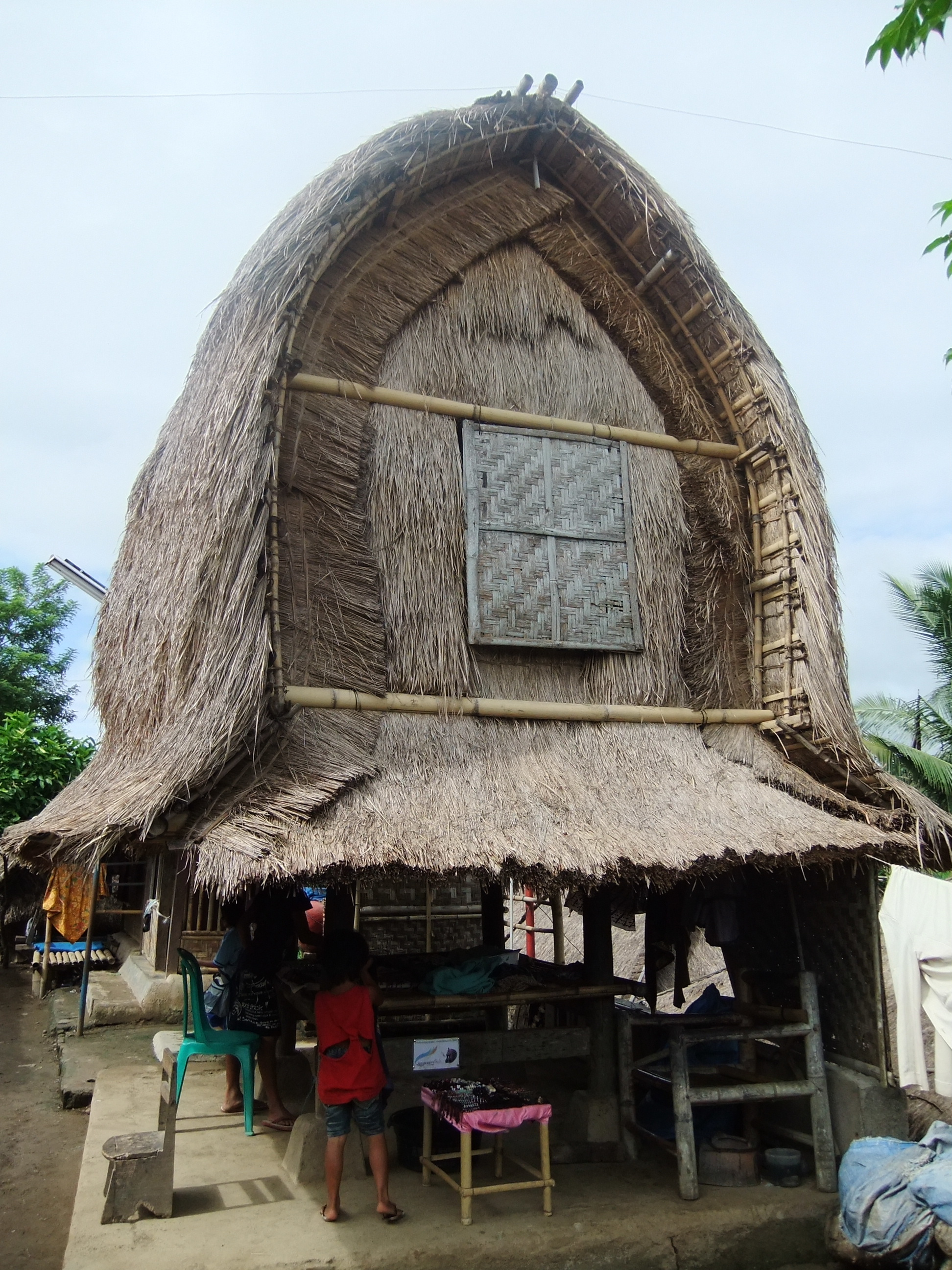
Traditional Sasak rice barn in village of Sade, Lombok, Indonesia.

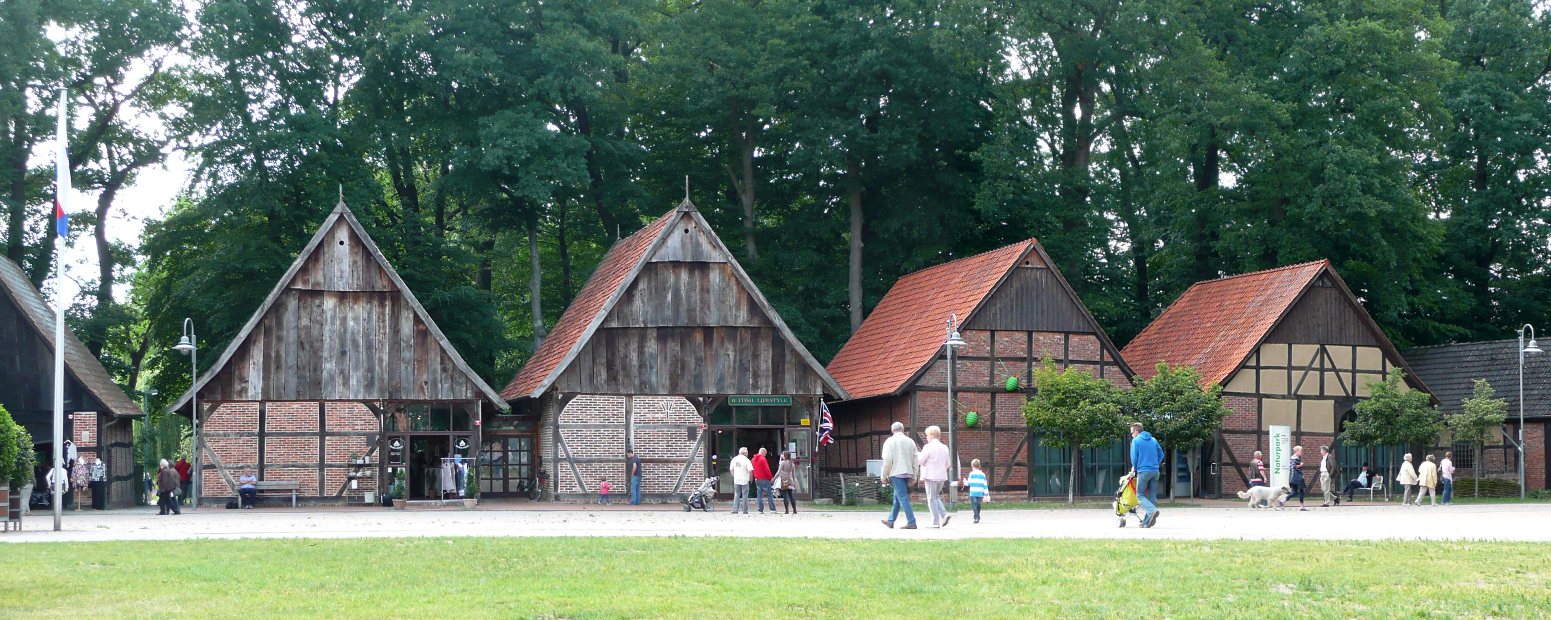
In Germany, due to the risk of fire, some hay barns were located in areas apart from houses in the inner town or village. These areas were called a Scheunenviertel, which translates as "barn quarter", from "Scheune", the German word for barn. This barn quarter is in Steinhude, Germany

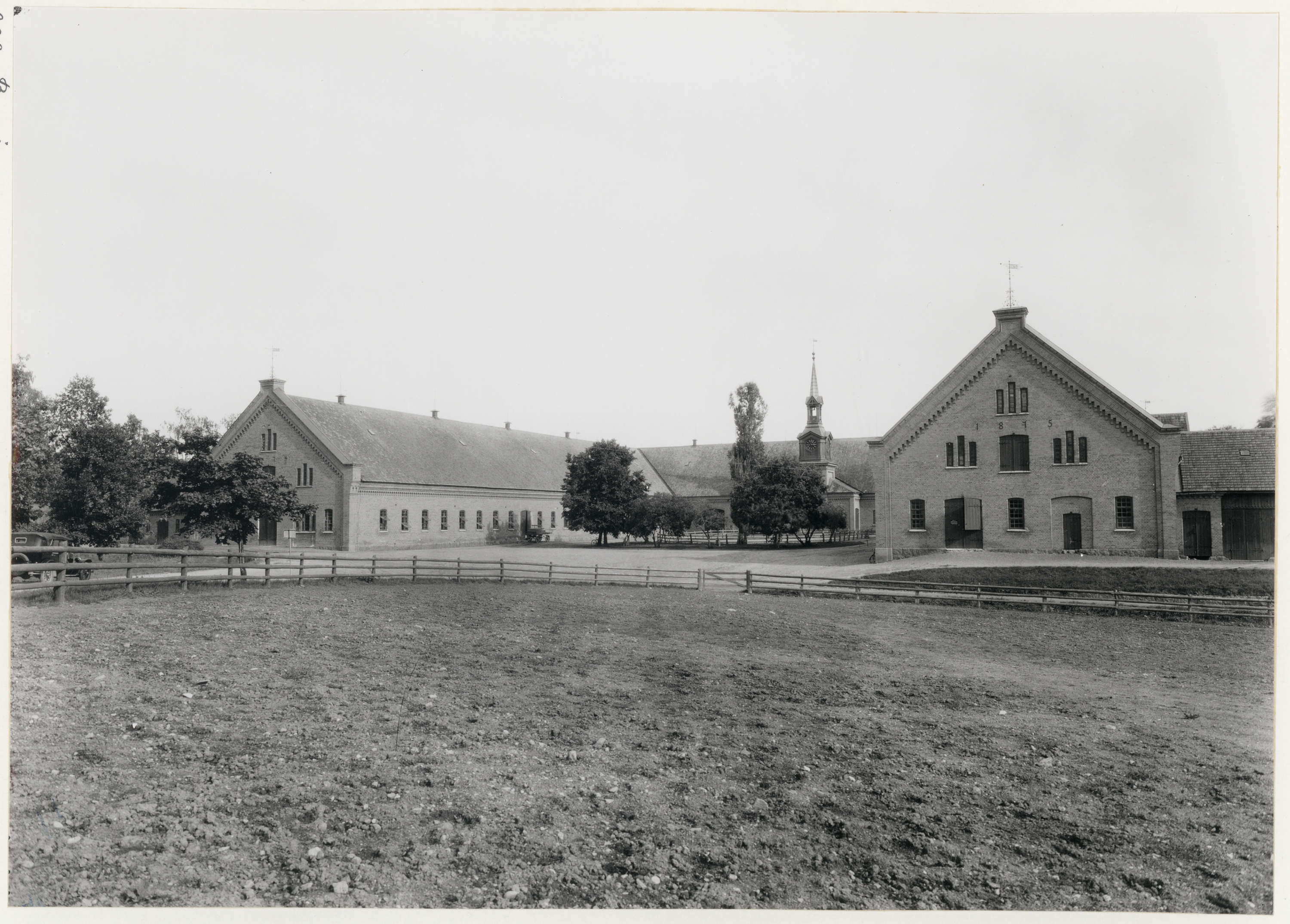
The barn at Bjärka-Säby Castle, Sweden, around 1909.

== See also ==
- Barn raising
- Barnyard
- Car barn
- Functionally classified barn
- Gambrel roof
- Gin gang or round house—an extension to a threshing barn.
- Goat tower
- Hayrack
- Scaffold (barn)
- Shed
