= Ground stable barn =

Ground stable barns are a relatively modern type of barn design found in many places across the United States. Mostly constructed after 1910 when government health regulations associated with the dairy industry were altered forcing changes in barn design.

== Design ==
These gambrel roofed buildings were widely adopted throughout the U.S. Promoted by agricultural college experiment station, these barns had washable concrete floors. Cattle were housed at ground level in steel pipe stanchion. The hay loft above is generally ample due to the gambrel roof, which can be erected with pre fabricated trusses. Small milk houses were usually attached to the main barn building and ventilators topped the roof providing fresh air.

== See also ==
- PHMC
- Historic Stable Barns
- Huehnerstall (in German)
- Building
