= Scaffold (barn) =

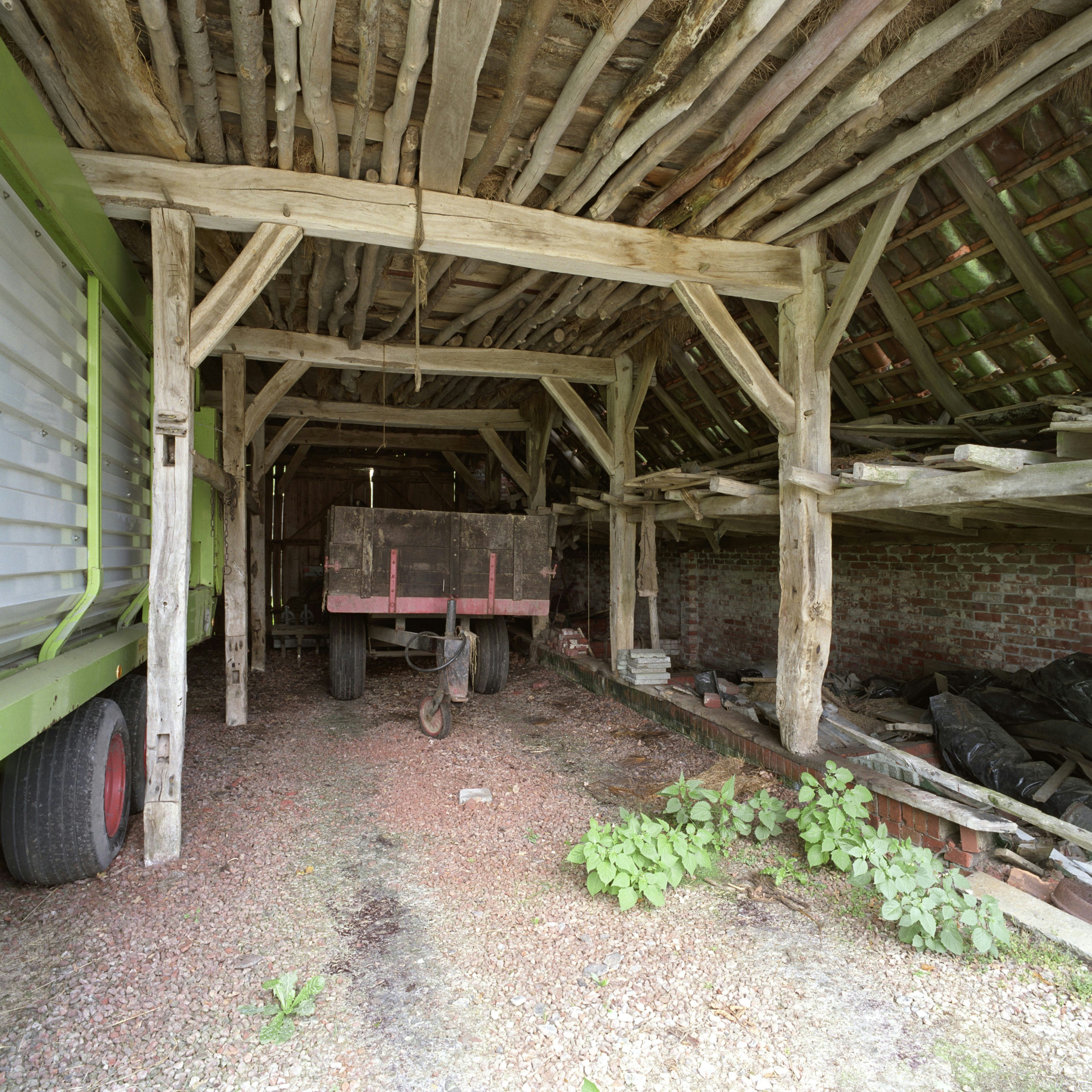
The scaffold is the floor directly overhead with the loose poles resting on the beams. Image: Cultural Heritage Agency of the Netherlands

Scaffold in a barn are loosely laid poles or joists generally above the drive floor on which crops are piled. The term has the same meaning of a temporary, elevated platform in other uses of the word.
