= Orajärvi =

Lake in Sodankylä, Finland

- Location within Lapland
- Coordinates: 67°21′N 26°50′E
- Basin countries: Finland
- Surface area: 10.948 km^{2} (4.227 sq mi)
- Average depth: 4.4 m (14 ft)
- Max. depth: 11 m (36 ft)
- Water volume: 0.0485 km^{3} (39,300 acre⋅ft)
- Shore length^{1}: 28 km (17 mi)
- Surface elevation: 181.5 m (595 ft)
- Frozen: November–May
- Islands: Seitasaari, Isosaari
- ^{1} Shore length is not a well-defined measure.

Orajärvi is medium-sized lake in the Kemijoki river's main catchment area in Finland. It is located in Sodankylä municipality, in the eastern Lapland region.

Orajärvi is also the name of a village comprising Orakylä, Hirviäkuru, Välisuvanto and Tepsanniemi. The population is 250. Orajärvi village is located 20 km south-east of Sodankylä. Orajärvi lake is also located there.

There are three other lakes in Finland that are named Orajärvi, they are located in the municipalities of Pello, Jyväskylä and Espoo.

== See also ==
- List of lakes in Finland
