= Corn crib =

Farm building

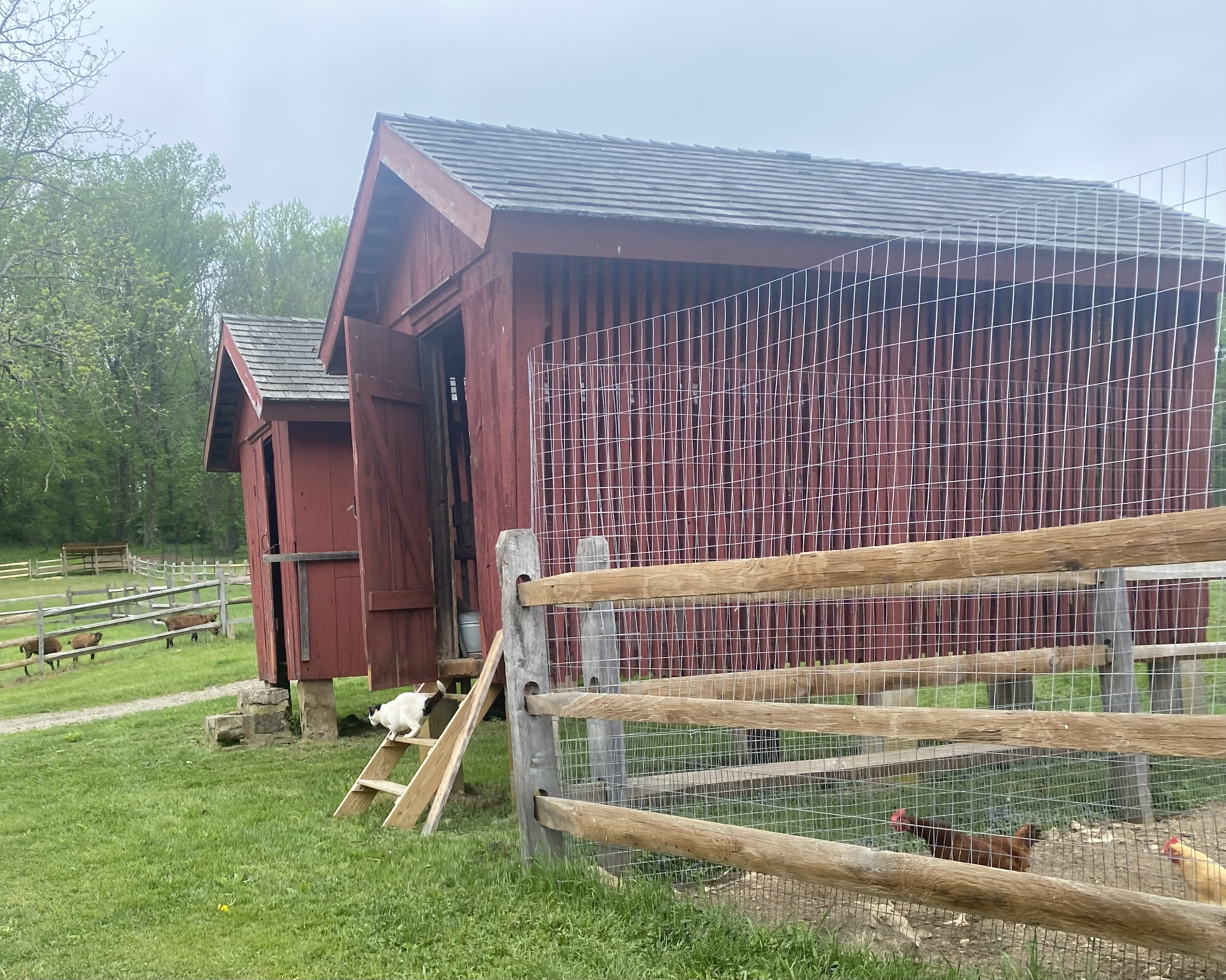
Two small red corn cribs at Fosterfields, New Jersey, likely built c. 1900

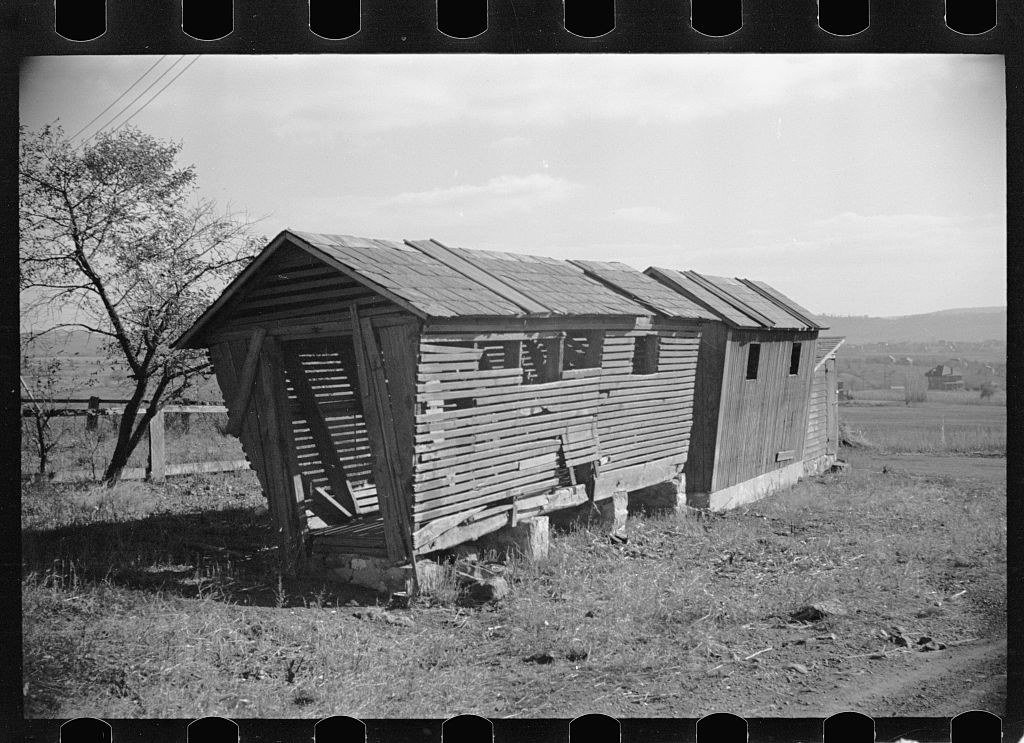
Corn crib with slanted sides

A corn crib or corncrib is a type of granary used to dry and store corn. It may also be known as a cornhouse or corn house.

== Overview ==
After the harvest and while still on the cob, corn is placed in the crib either with or without the husk. The typical corn crib has slats in its walls to allow air to circulate through the corn, both allowing it to dry initially and helping it stay dry. The slats expose the corn to pests, so corn cribs are elevated beyond the reach of rodents.

Although granaries had been used around the world in all cultures who grew grain for food, corn cribs were first used by Native Americans and then quickly adopted by European settlers. Struggling European settlers often raided corn cribs for food. As a result, at least some Native groups abandoned the corn crib and buried food in caches.

Corn crib designs vary greatly. They were originally made of wood, but other materials such as concrete have also been used. The basic corn crib consists of a roofed bin elevated on posts. Another typical early American design has walls slanted outward. Most of the larger designs have an open space in the middle for accessing corn and promoting airflow. In larger designs, this space was often used to store wagons. By the early 20th century, the term "corn crib" was applied to large barns that contained many individual bins of corn. Today a typical corn crib on many farms is a cylindrical cage of galvanized wire fencing covered by a metal roof formed of corrugated galvanised iron.

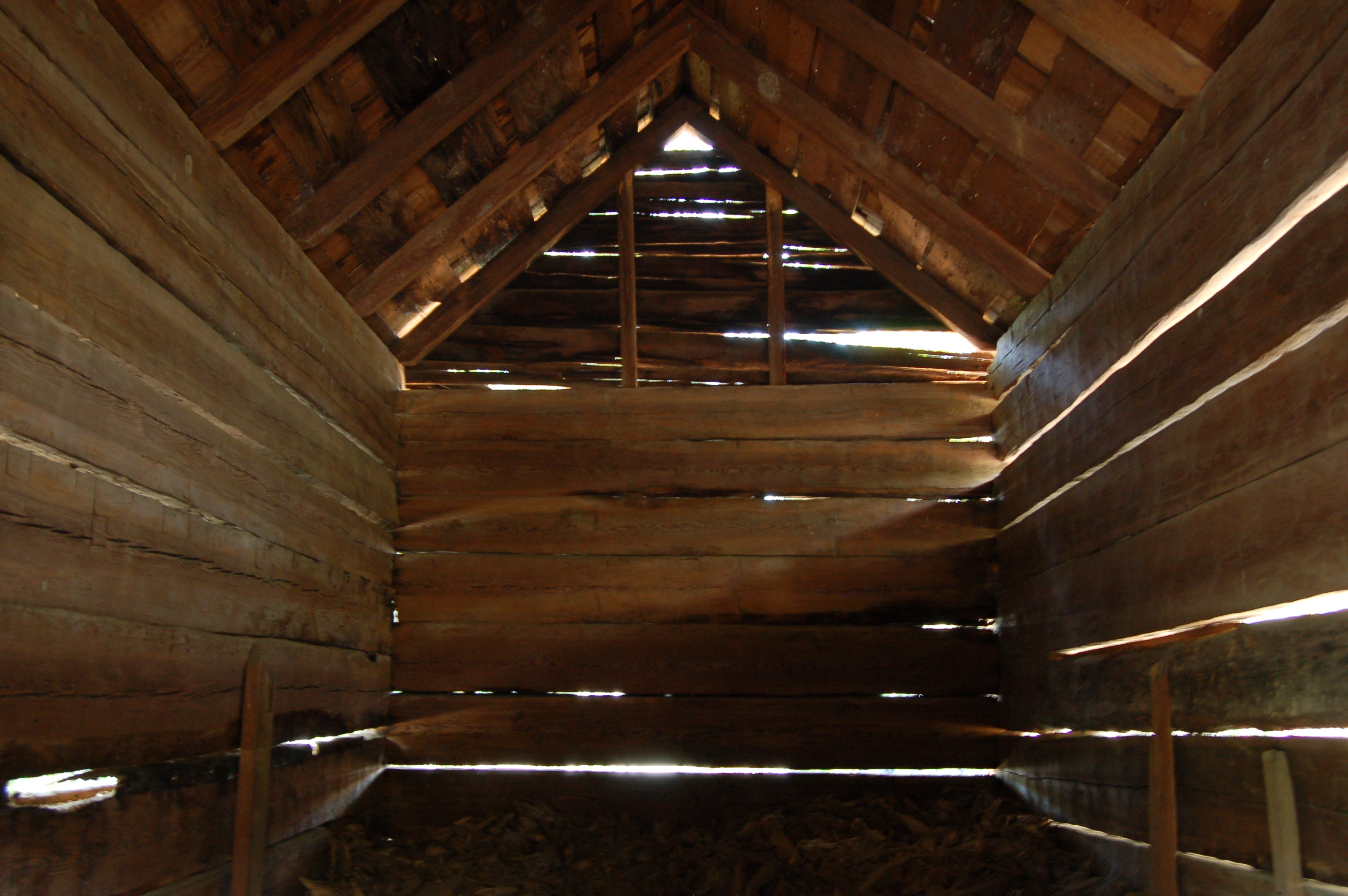
Corn crib interior in North Carolina, US

== See also ==
- Hambar – corn cribs in the Balkans and surrounding region
- Hórreo
- Raccard

== Gallery ==
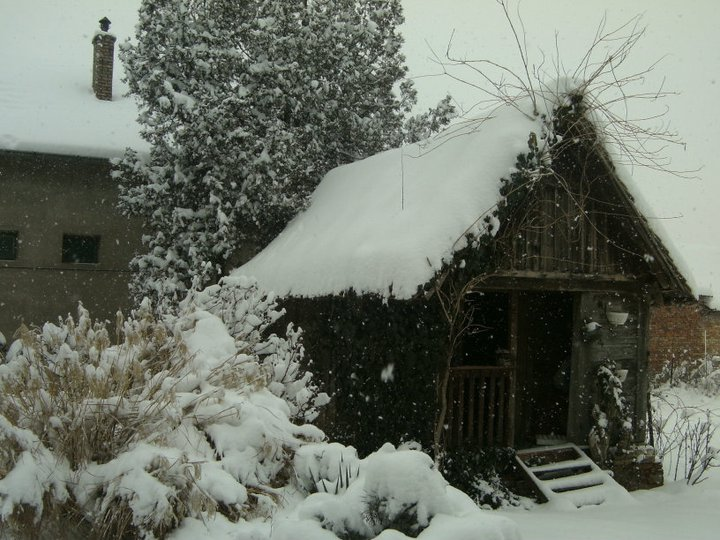
Hambar from 1888 in Banovci, Croatia, during winter

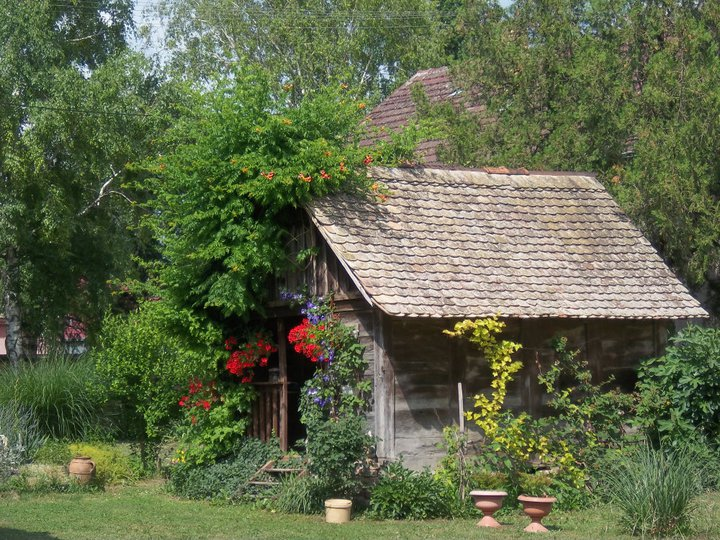
Hambar from 1888 in Banovci, Croatia, during summer

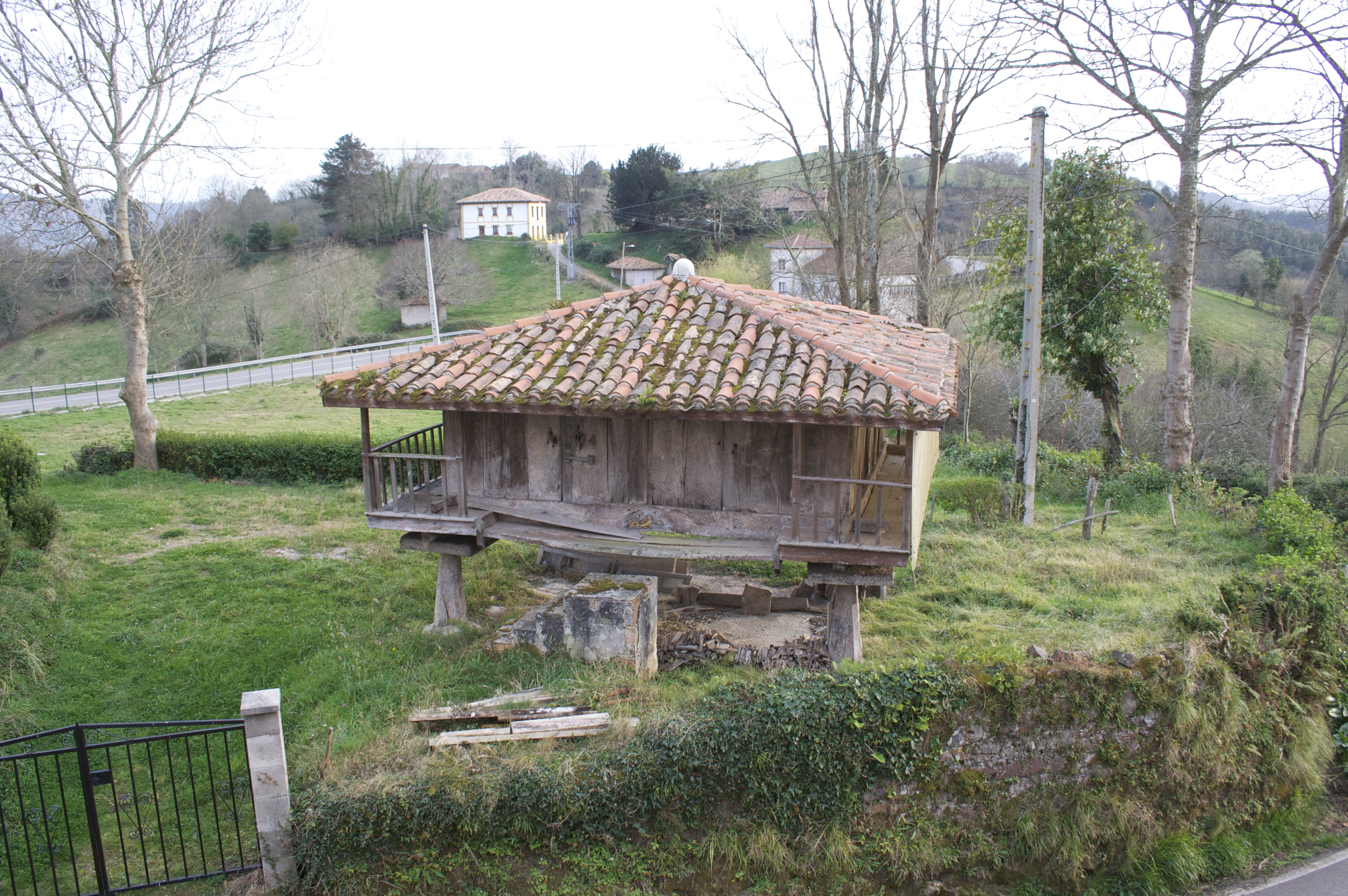
Hórreo in Asturias

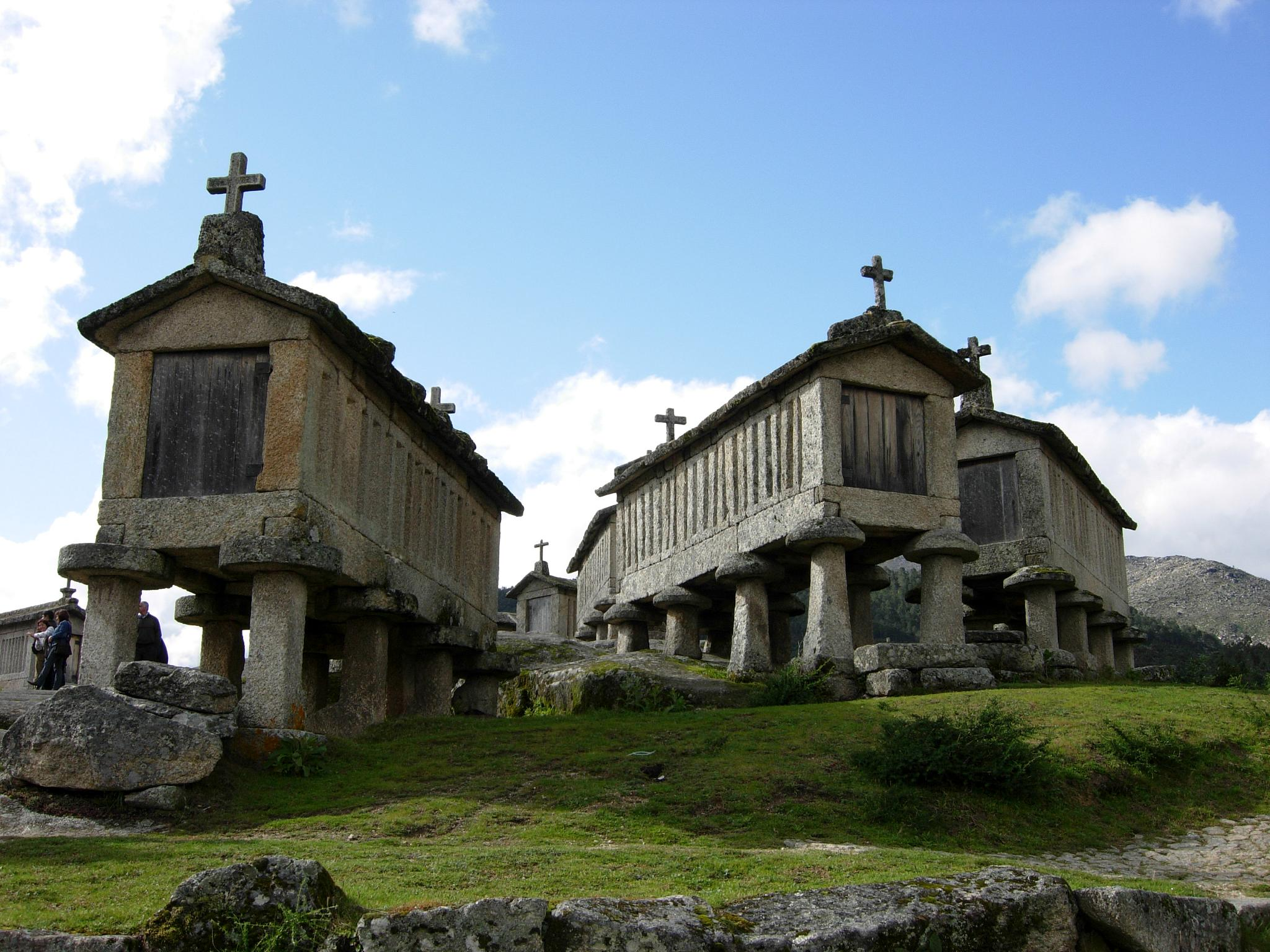
The 24 granite Espigueiros of Soajo, Peneda-Gerês National Park, Portugal

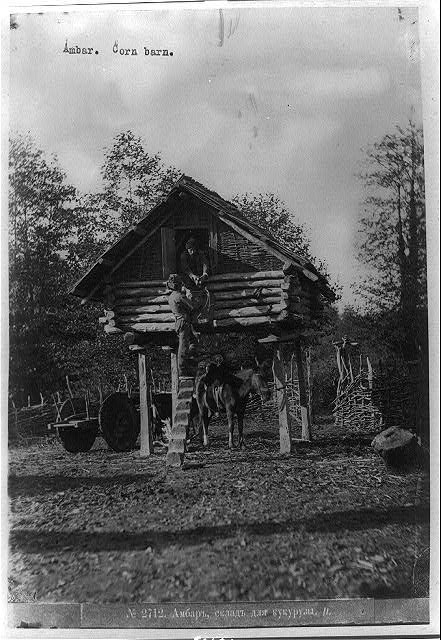
19th-century corn crib in Russia.

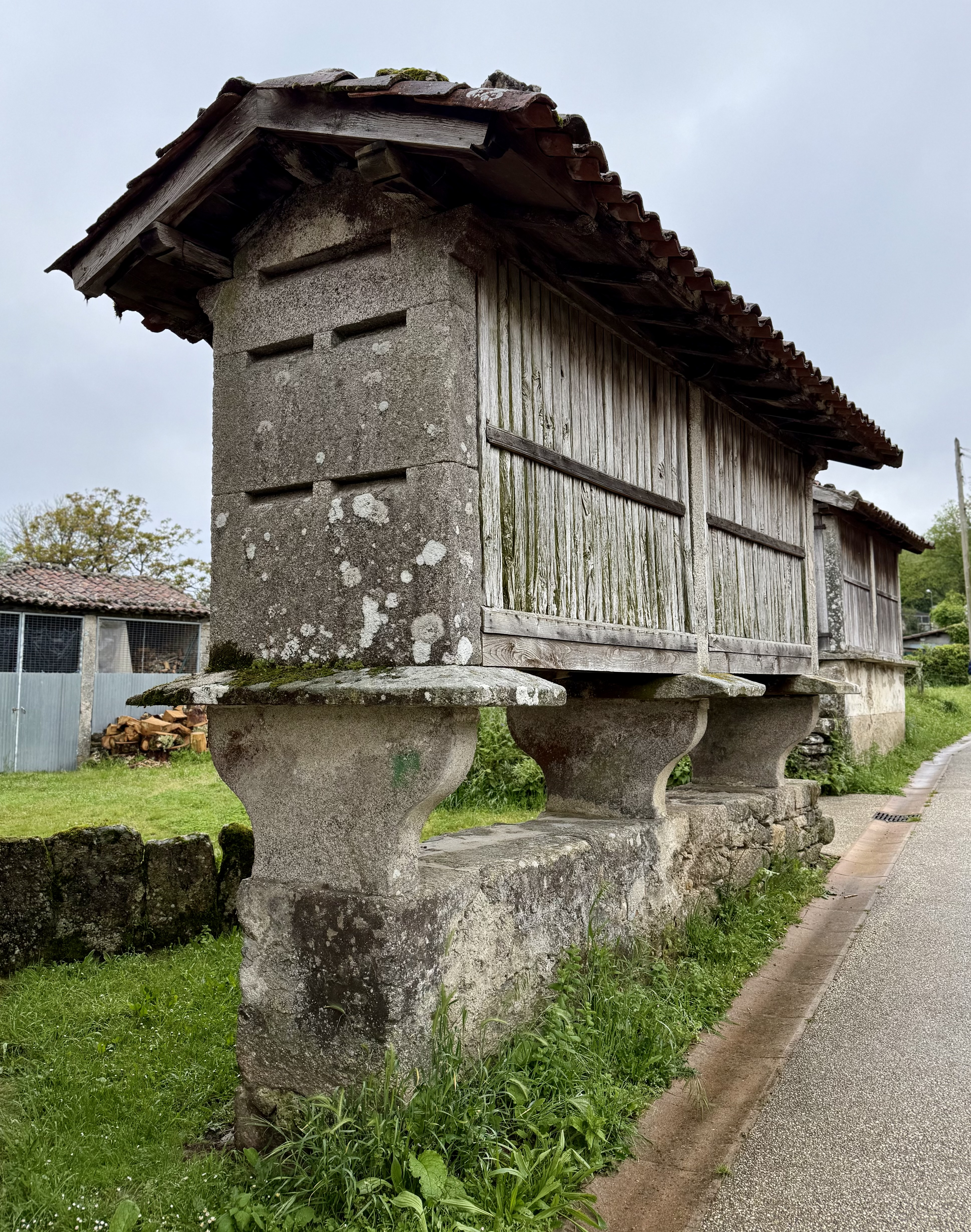
A typical corn crib, locally called a Hórreo, in the Galicia region of Spain.
