= Hambar =

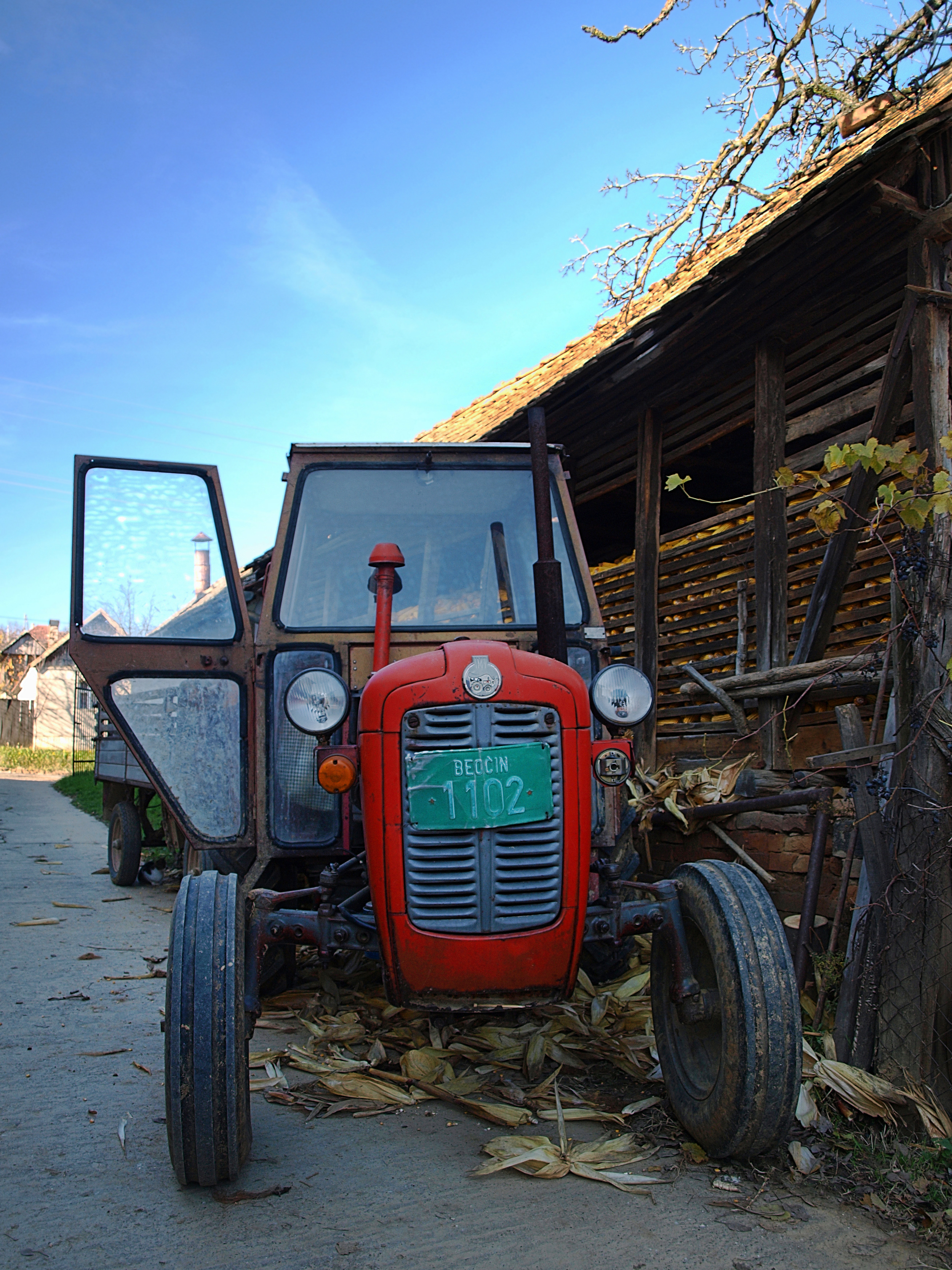
Traditional corn crib in Lug, Serbia

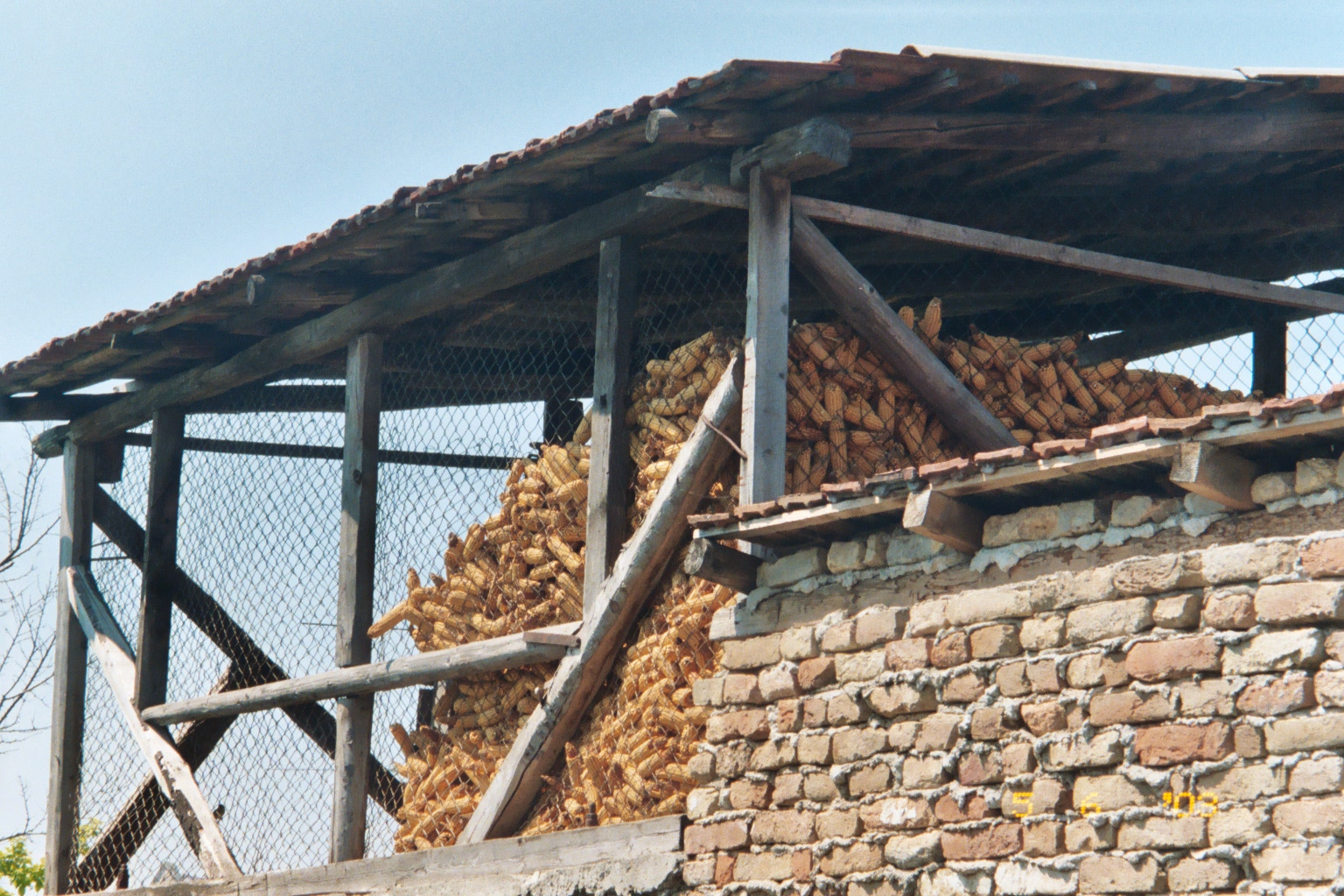
A hambar still in heavy use in Hatzfeld/Jimbolia, Romanian Banat, albeit with the traditional wooden slats replaced with chicken wire

A hambar (Aromanian: ambare, Bulgarian: хамбар, romanized: hambar, Hungarian: hombár, Romanian: pătul, Russian: амбар, romanized: ambar, Serbian: амбар or чардак, romanized: ambar or čardak) is a corn crib or small building commonly used for storing and drying maize in the Balkans and the neighboring regions in the Pannonian plain and north of the Danube. The word comes from Turkish ambar, meaning "storehouse, warehouse, repository", from the Greek nautical term ἀμπάρι (ampari), meaning "stowage". The word and the concept are used in Europe as far north as Hungary and the White Sea in Russia.

In Hebrew, the word אמבר (pronounced AMBAR) means a storage place for wheat. The word does not appear in the Bible.

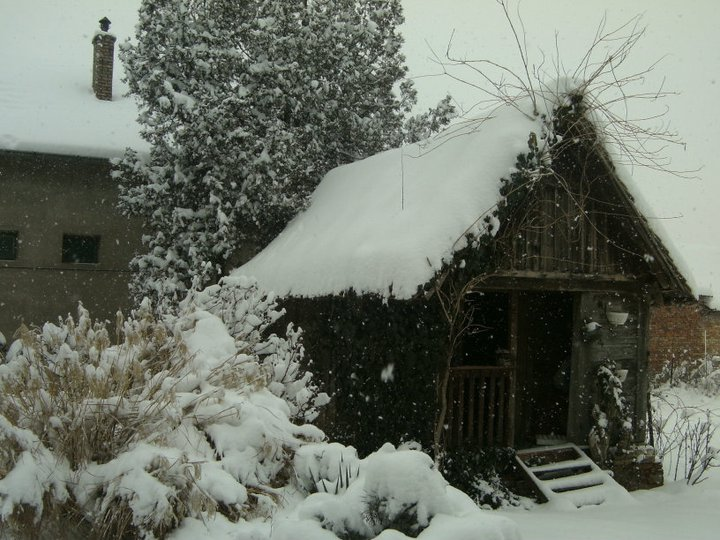
Ambar from 1888 in Banovci, Croatia during winter

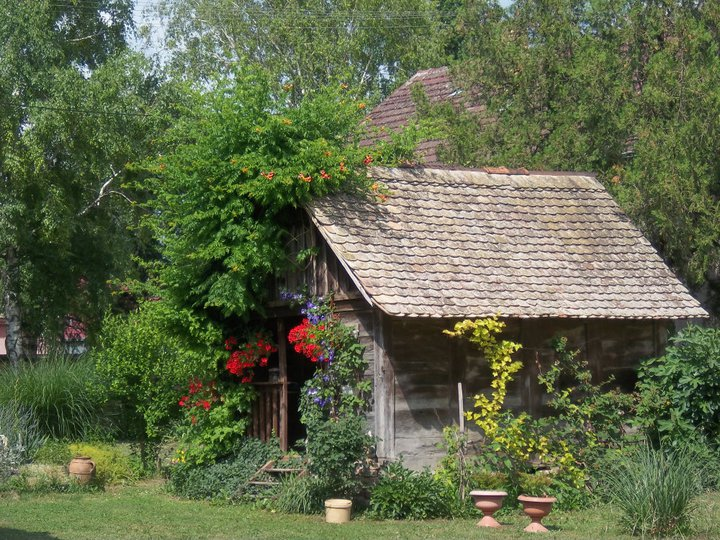
Ambar from 1888 in Banovci, Croatia during summer

== See also ==
- Hórreo, the equivalent construction in Northern Spain.
