= Hórreo =

Granery in northeastern Iberian peninsula

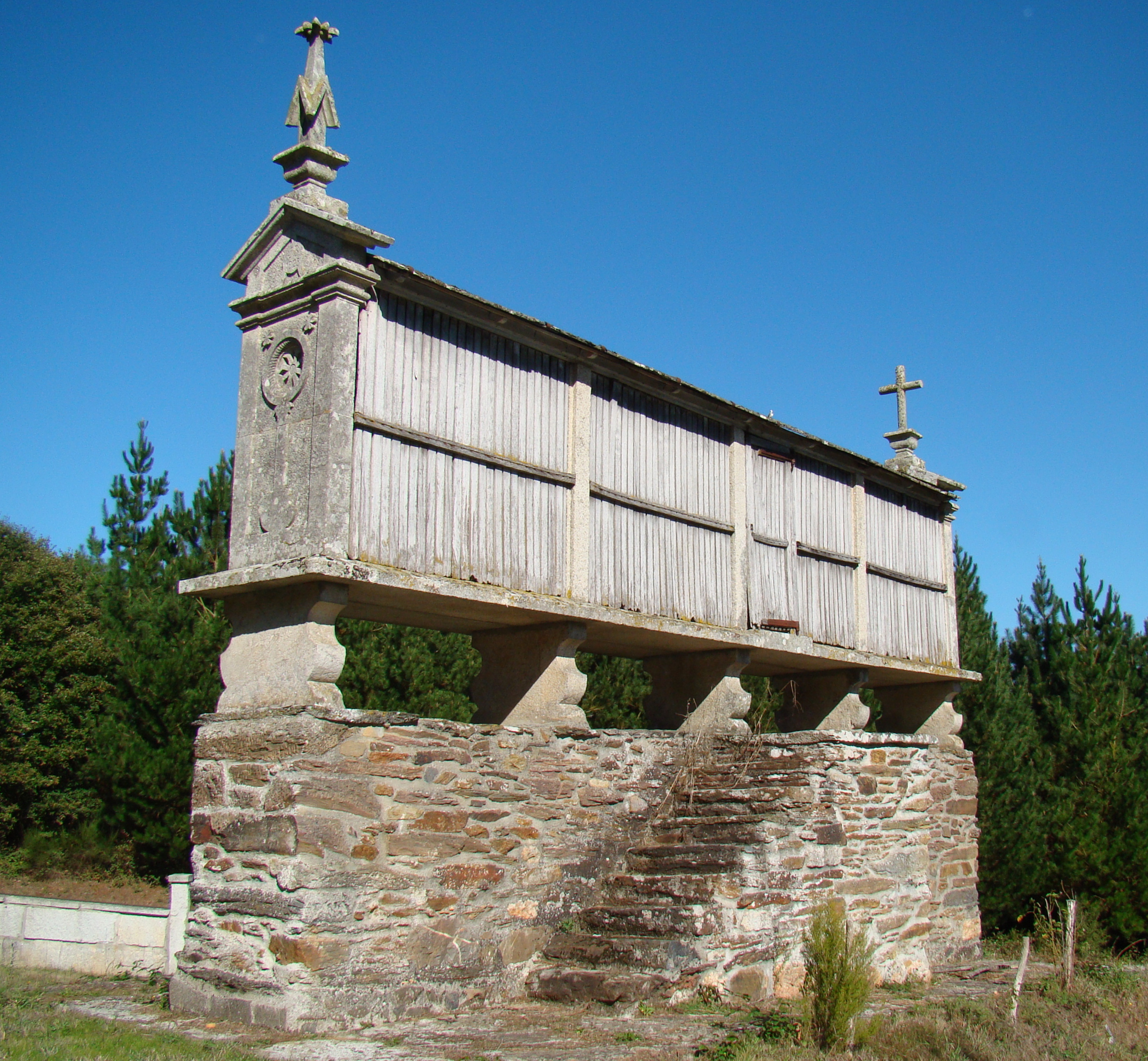
Stone hórreo with wooden walls in Portomarín, Galicia.

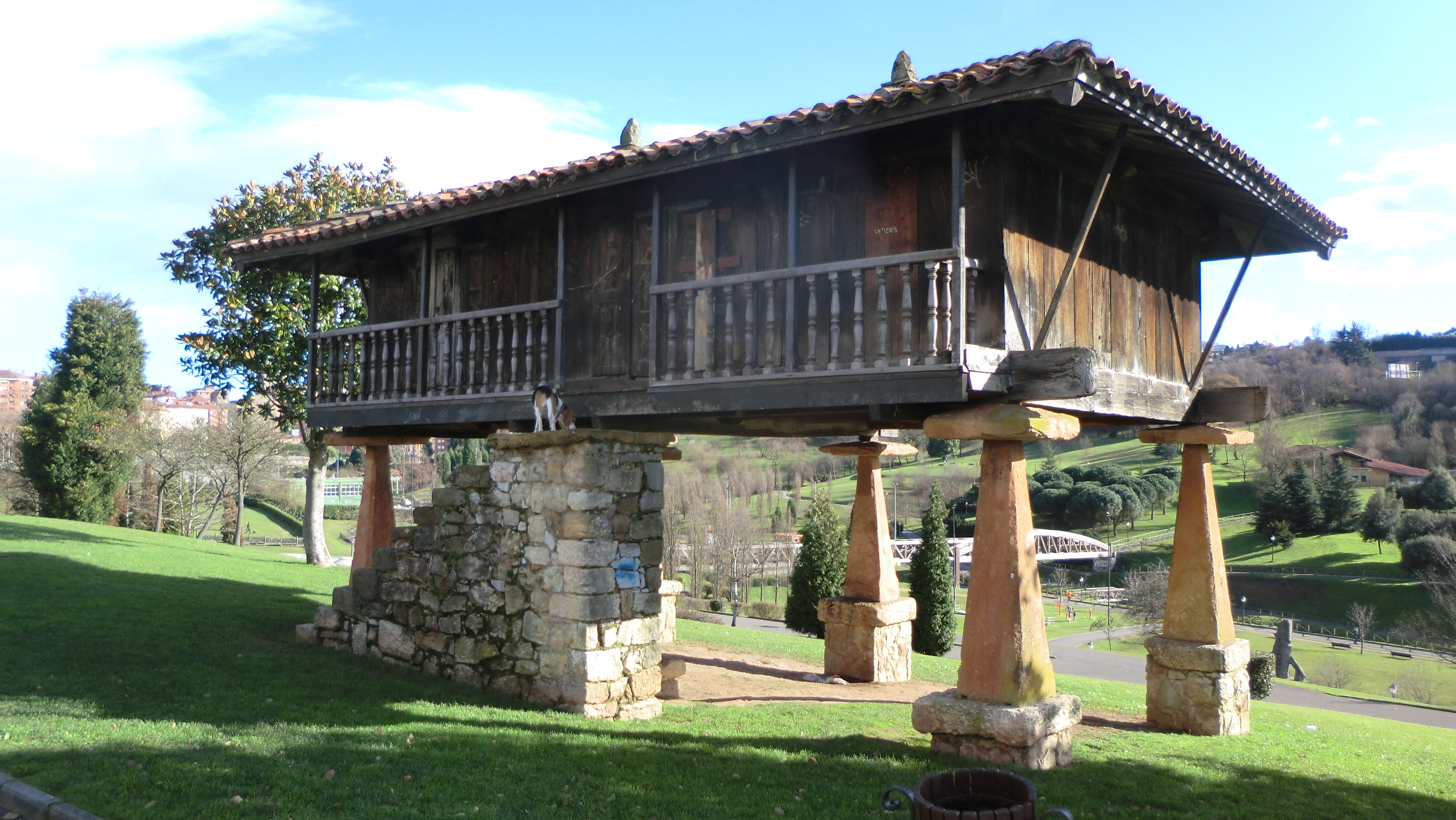
Wooden panera on stone pillars in Oviedo, Asturias.

An hórreo (Galician: [ˈo.re.ʊ]) is a traditional agricultural building found throughout the northwest of the Iberian Peninsula, designed to store and preserve food, especially grain, away from moisture and animals, keeping it in optimal condition. Built in stone, wood, or bricks, it is raised from the ground by pillars ending in flat staddle stones to prevent access by rodents, with ventilation allowed by the slits in its walls. Although they are most commonly found in Spain in Galicia and Asturias, they are also found in Léon, Zamora, Cantabria, the Basque Country, and Navarre. They are also found in Northern Portugal.

Documented as early as the 9th century, hórreos were originally designed as storehouses for grain, meat, or agricultural products, although their use later expanded to include other purposes such as craft workshops, tool sheds, curing areas for sausages, meats, or cheeses, beehives or dovecotes, and even dwellings. The space beneath is also sometimes used as a stable or for storing carts.

== Names ==
An hórreo is also known as horriu or horru in Asturian; horriu in Leonese; hurriu in Cantabrian; hórreo, paneira, canastro, piorno, or cabazo in Galician; espigueiro, canastro, caniço, or hórreo in Portuguese; and garea, garaia, or garaixea in Basque. The term ultimately derives from Latin hordeum (“barley”).

Its pillars are known as pegollos in Asturian and Cantabrian, esteos in Galician, espigueiros in Portuguese, and abearriak in Basque; and the flat staddle stones are known as vira-ratos in Galician, mueles or tornarratos in Asturian, or zubiluzea in Basque.

== Origins ==
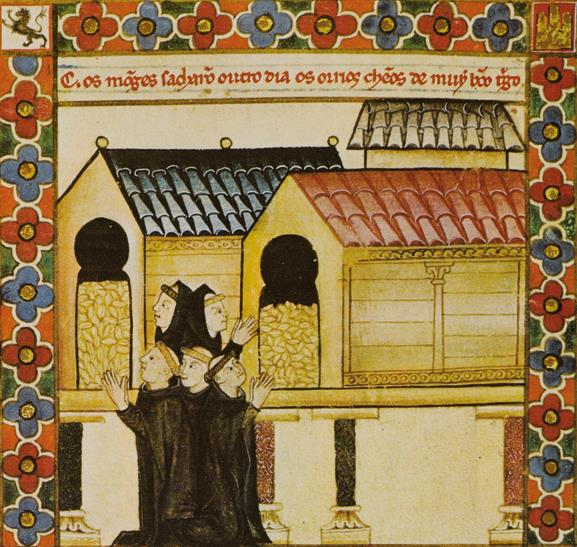
Illustration from a manuscript of the Galician Cantigas de Santa Maria (c. 1280)

The hórreo has its origin in elevated and ventilated granaries that existed in Celtiberian villages before the arrival of the Romans, but the few documents that exist do not allow establishing a formal relationship with the current type.

The oldest known document that uses the word horreo referring to a granary is a document from the year 800 relating to the founding of the Taranco monastery, in Valle de Mena, in the current province of Burgos. The oldest known document containing an image of an hórreo is the Cantigas de Santa Maria (song CLXXXVII) written during the reign of Alfonso X of Castile in the 13th century. In this depiction, three rectangular hórreos of gothic style are illustrated.

== Distribution ==
Horreos are found throughout the northwest of the Iberian Peninsula: in northwestern Spain and Northern Portugal. Although they are most commonly found in Spain in Galicia and Asturias, they are also found in Léon, Zamora, Cantabria, the Basque Country, and Navarre.

Approximately 100,000 hórreos are found in Galicia, another 30,000 in Asturias, about 400 in León, about 30 in Cantabria, about 20 in Navarre, and almost negligible amounts in the Basque Country and Zamora, in addition to an undetermined number of them in Northern Portugal.

== Types ==
There are two main types of hórreos: rectangular-shaped, the more extended, usually found in Northern Portugal, Galicia, and coastal areas of Asturias; and square-shaped found in Asturias, Léon, western Cantabria, and eastern Galicia. They are made entirely of stone, of stone with wooden side walls, entirely of wood, of wood on stone feet, or even of brick. The roofs are usually covered with tiles, although some are covered with thatch, slate, or stone.

In Asturias, those square-shaped with a pyramid hip roof with a single central peak are hórreos; while those rectangular-shaped with a hip roof with a central rige are paneras. They are classified according to the characteristics of the roof (thatched, tiled, slate, pitched, or double pitched), the materials used for the pillars, or the decoration. The oldest still standing date from the 15th century, and even nowadays they are built ex novo. Some of them are poorly preserved but there is a growing awareness from owners and authorities to maintain them in good condition.

The longest hórreo is located in Carnota (A Coruña) and is 35 metres (115 ft) long.

Other similar granary structures include cabaceiras (Galician round basketwork hórreo), trojes or trojs in Castile, or silos.

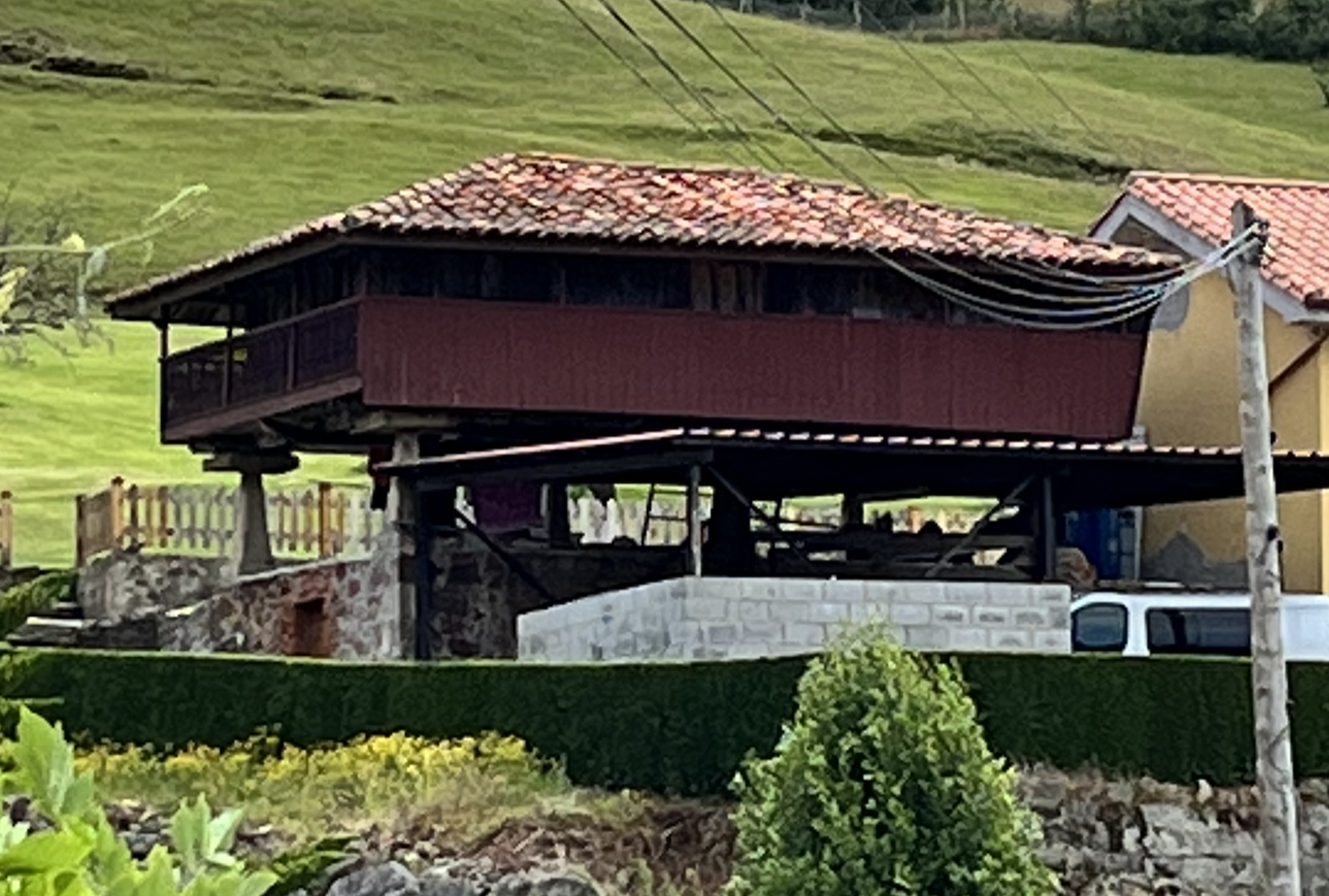
Panera in Luanco, Asturias

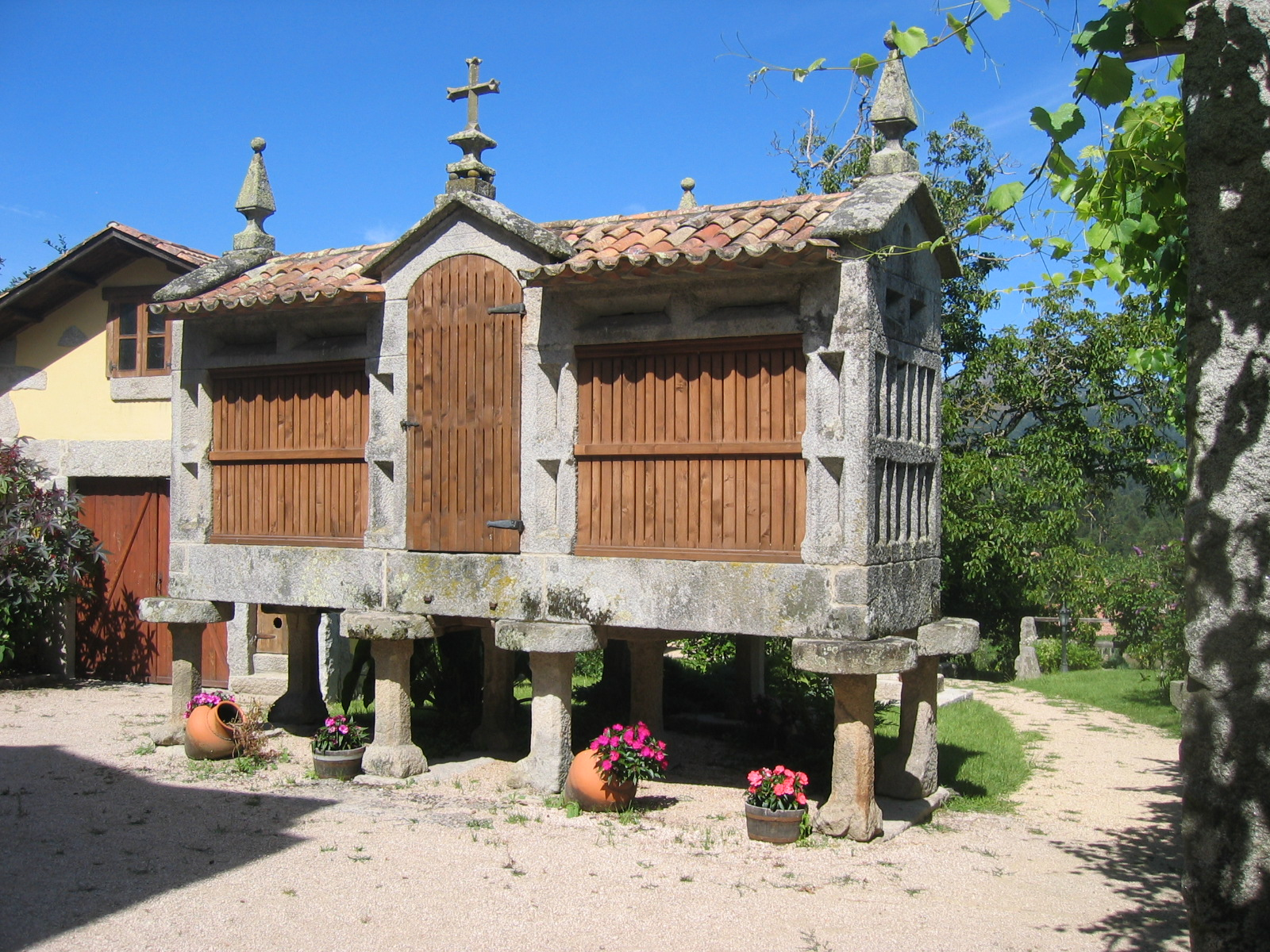
Hórreo in Gondomar, Galicia.

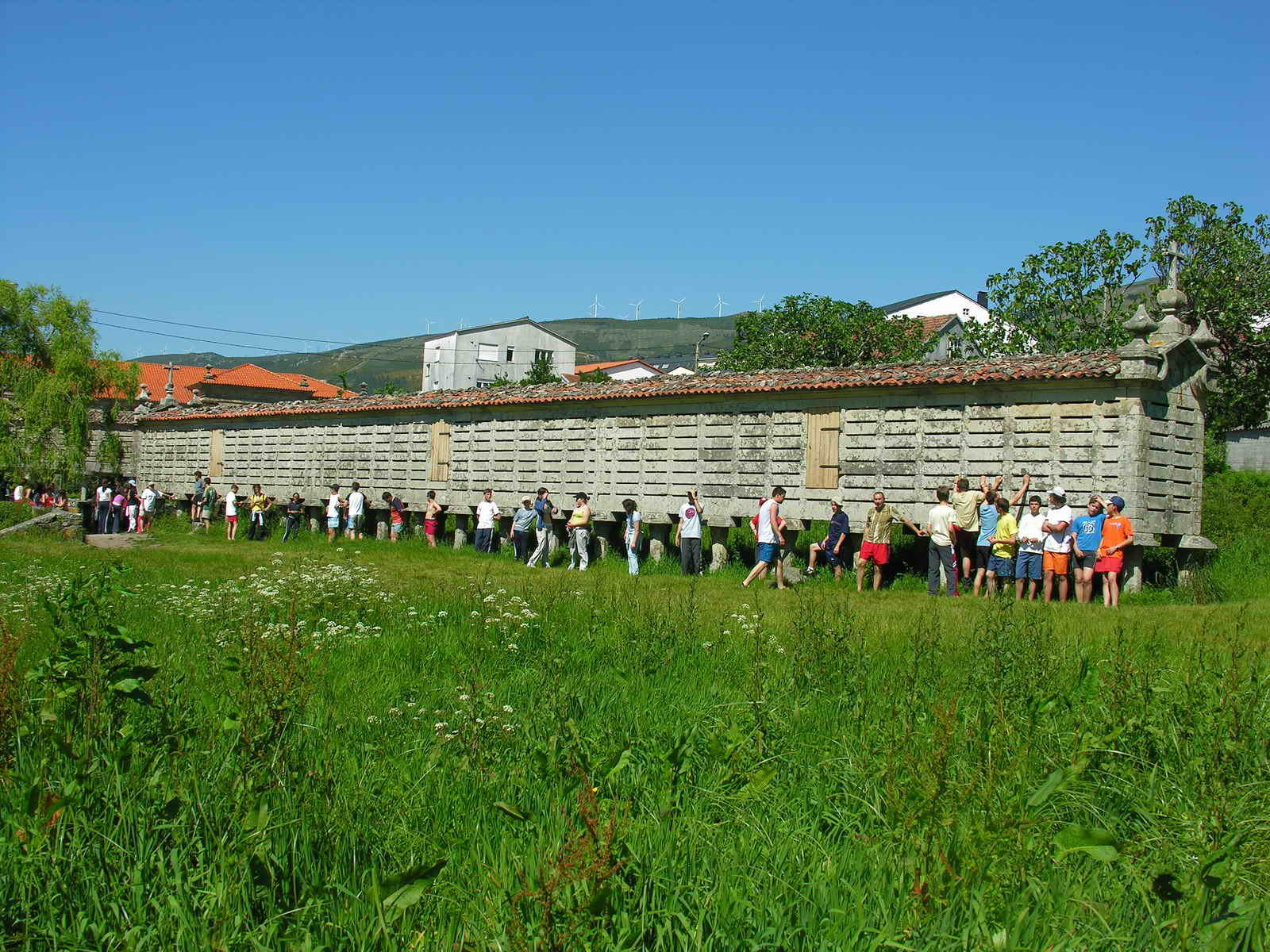
Hórreo in Carnota, Galicia.

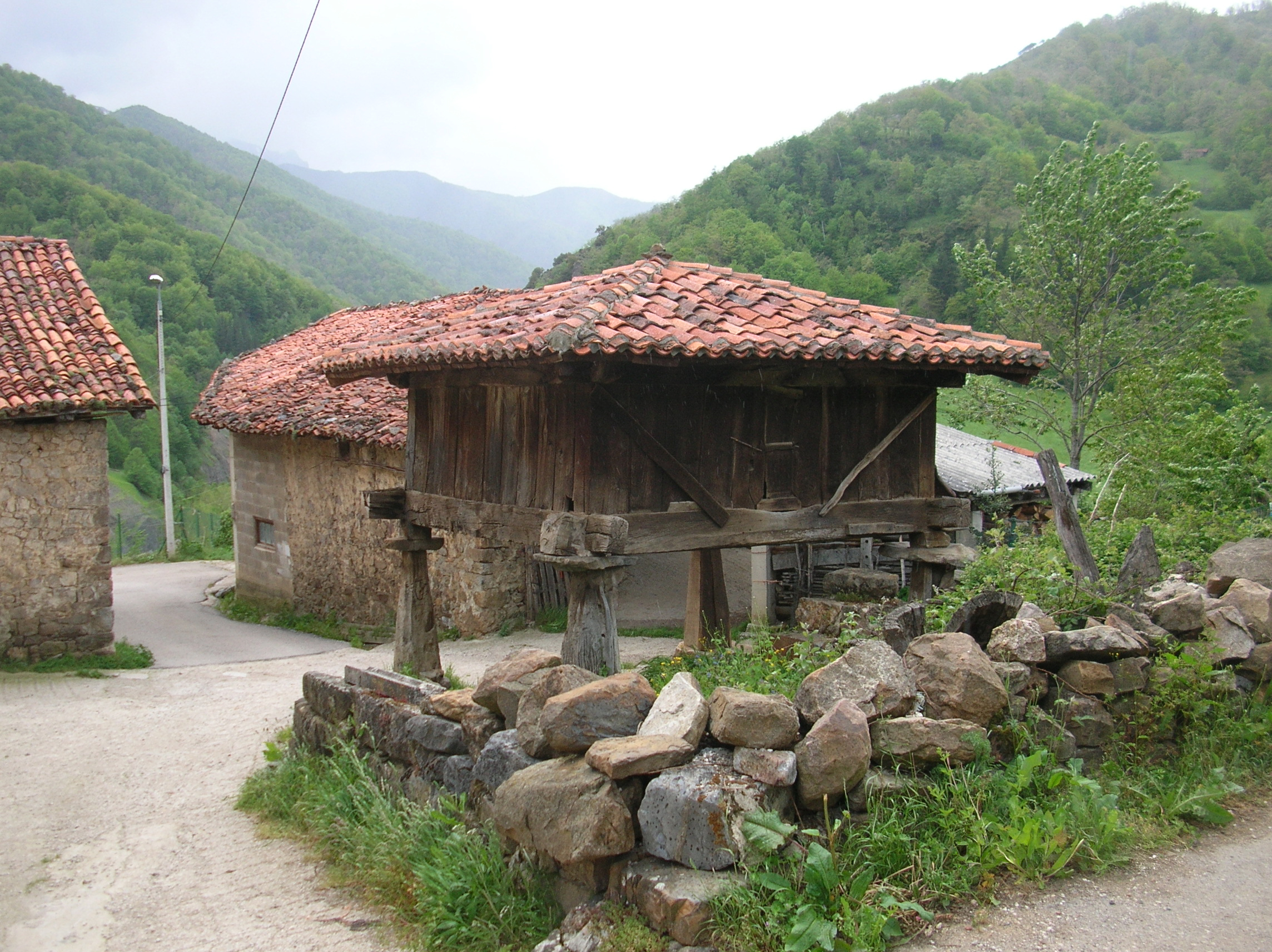
Hórreo in Cosgaya, Cantabria.

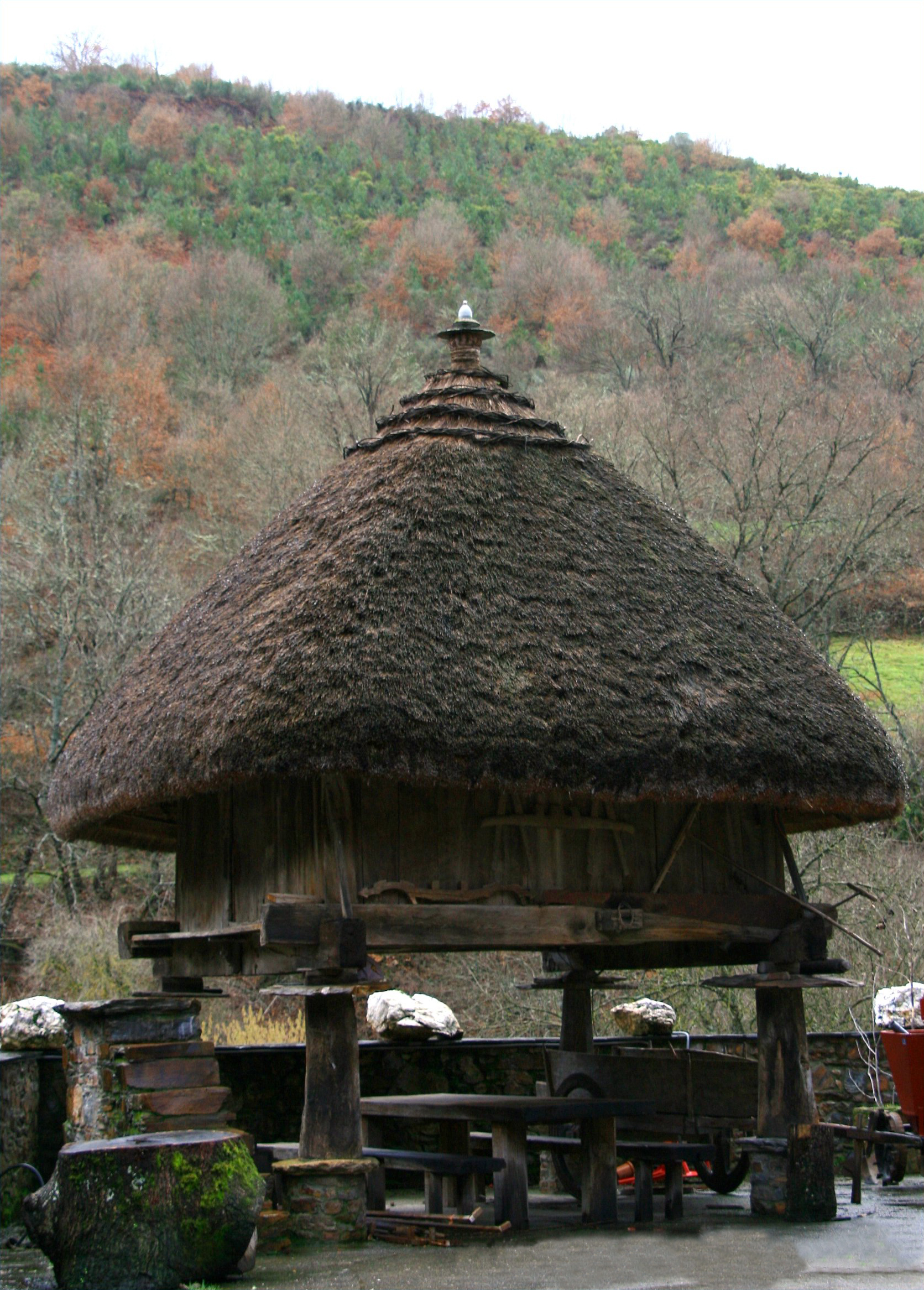
Hórreo in Piornedo, Galicia.

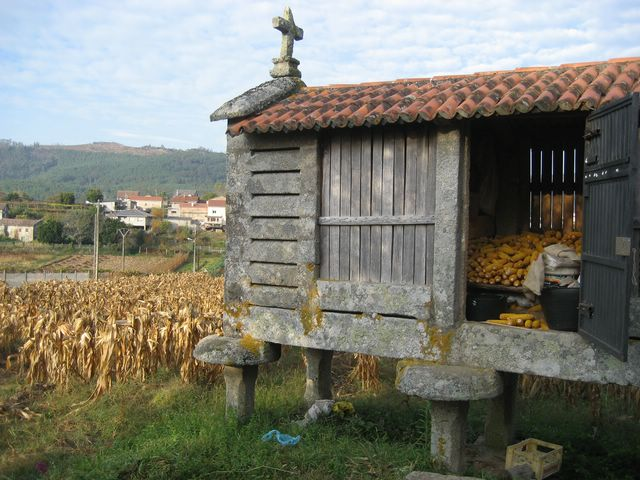
Corn cobs inside an hórreo in Boiro, Galicia.

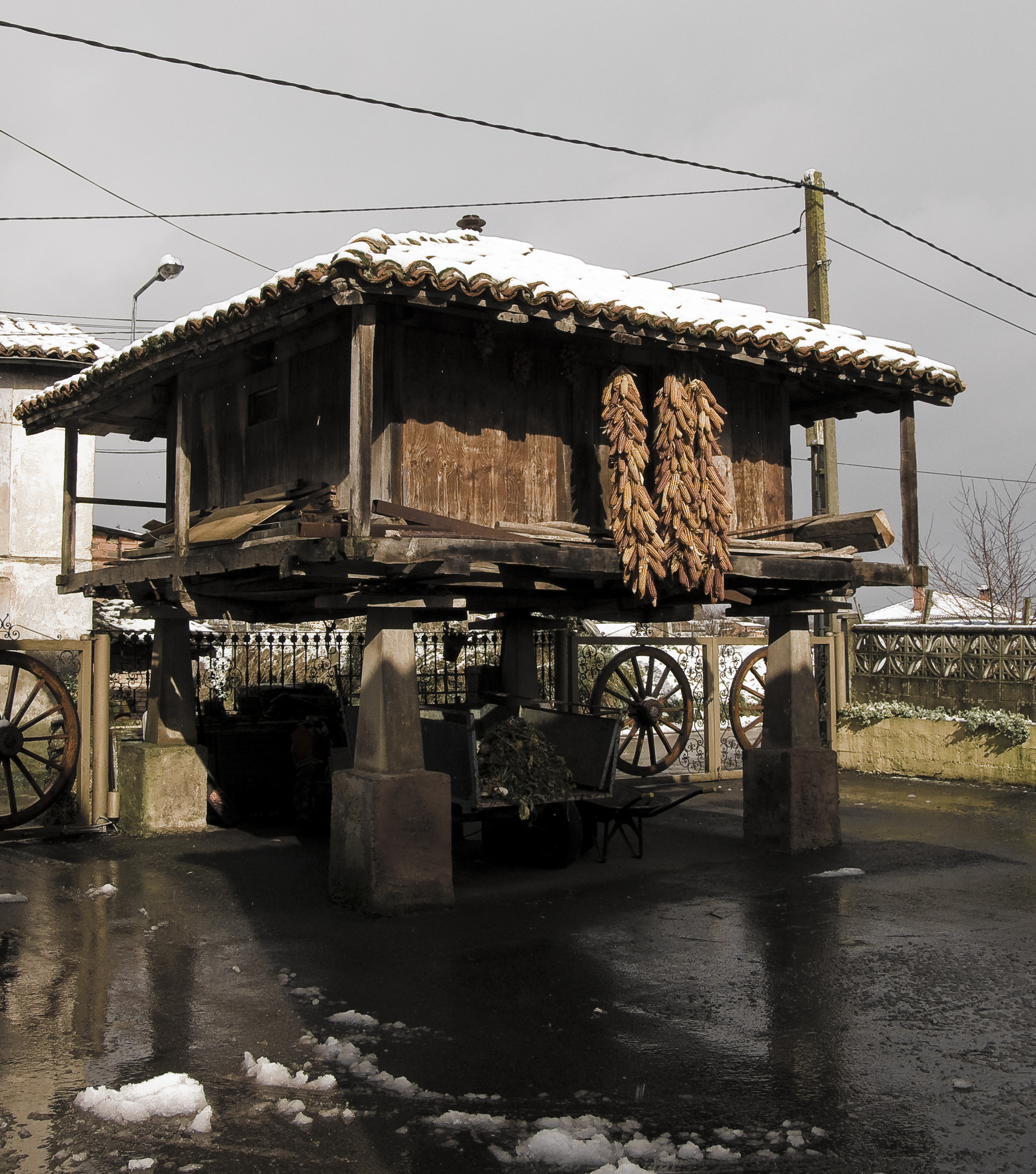
Hórreo in Siero, Asturias.

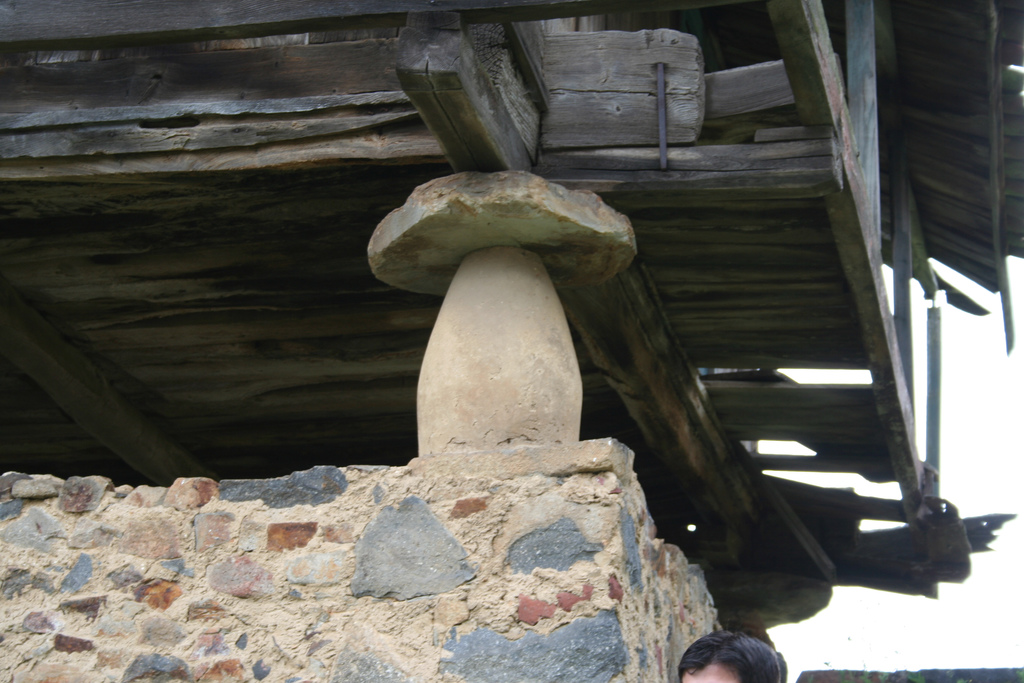
Stone pillar (pegollu) standing on a footing stone (pilpayu) and capped with a staddle stone (muela).

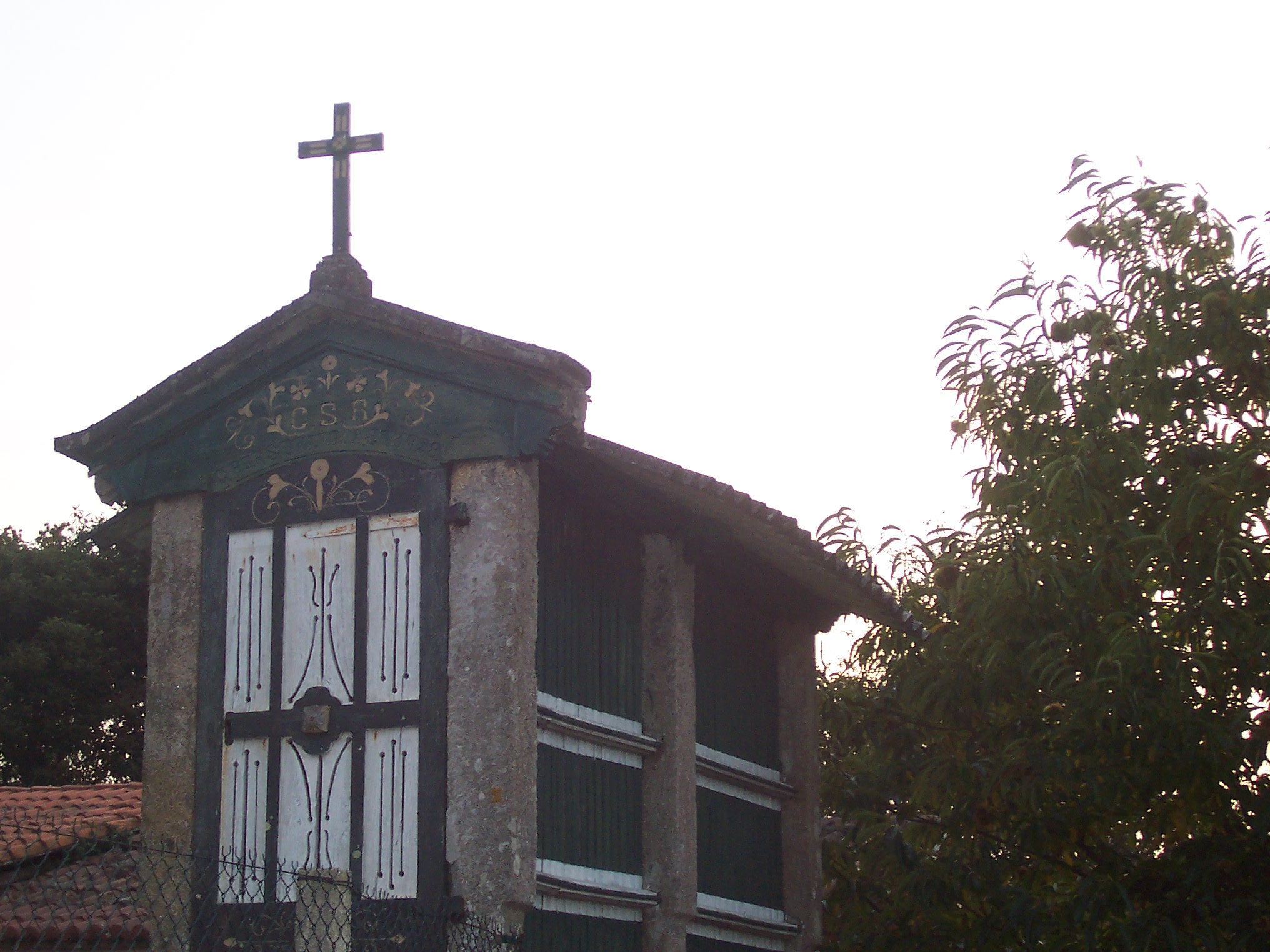
Decorated horreo in Ames, Galicia.

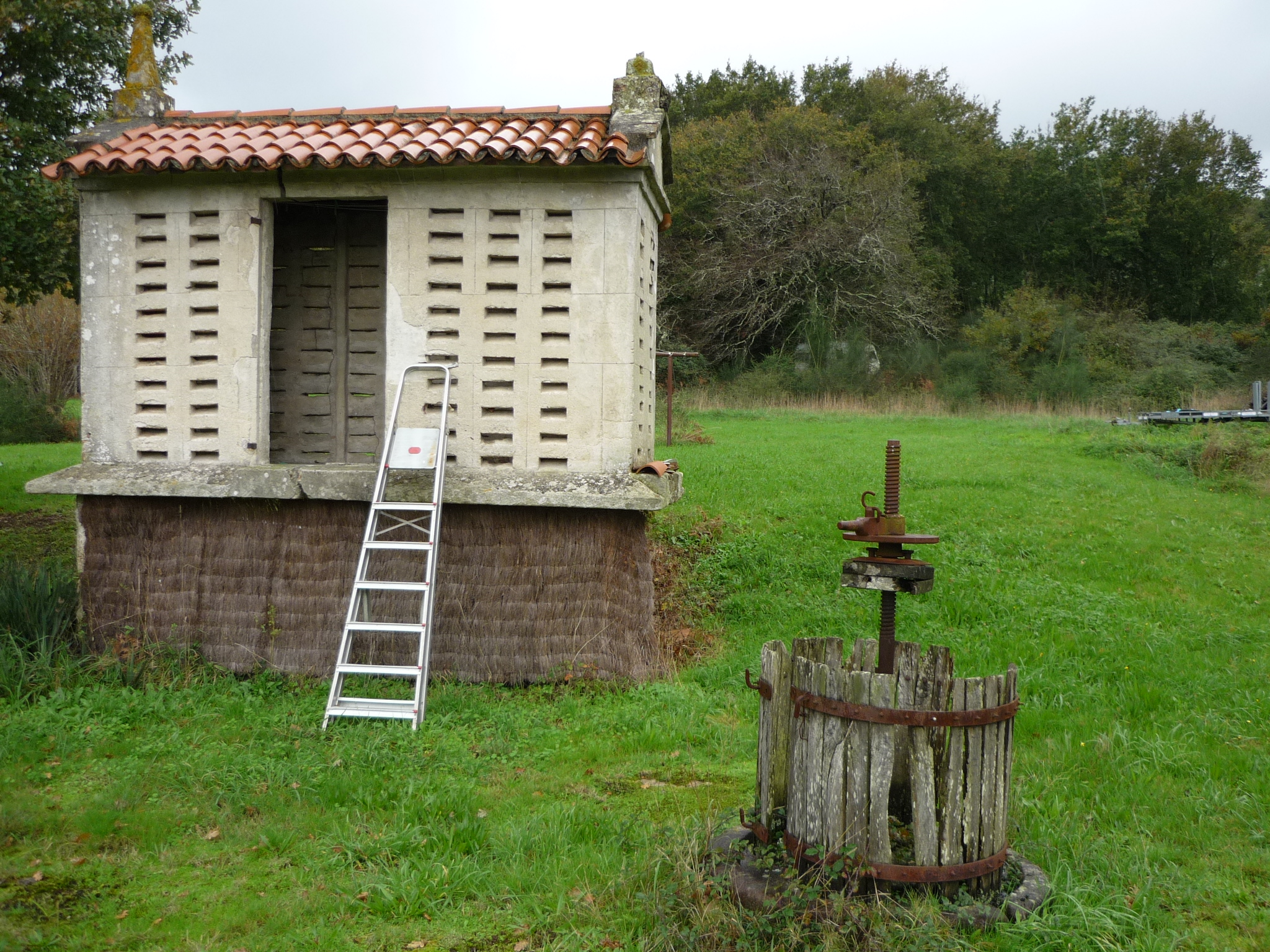
Brick horreo in Dodro, Galicia.

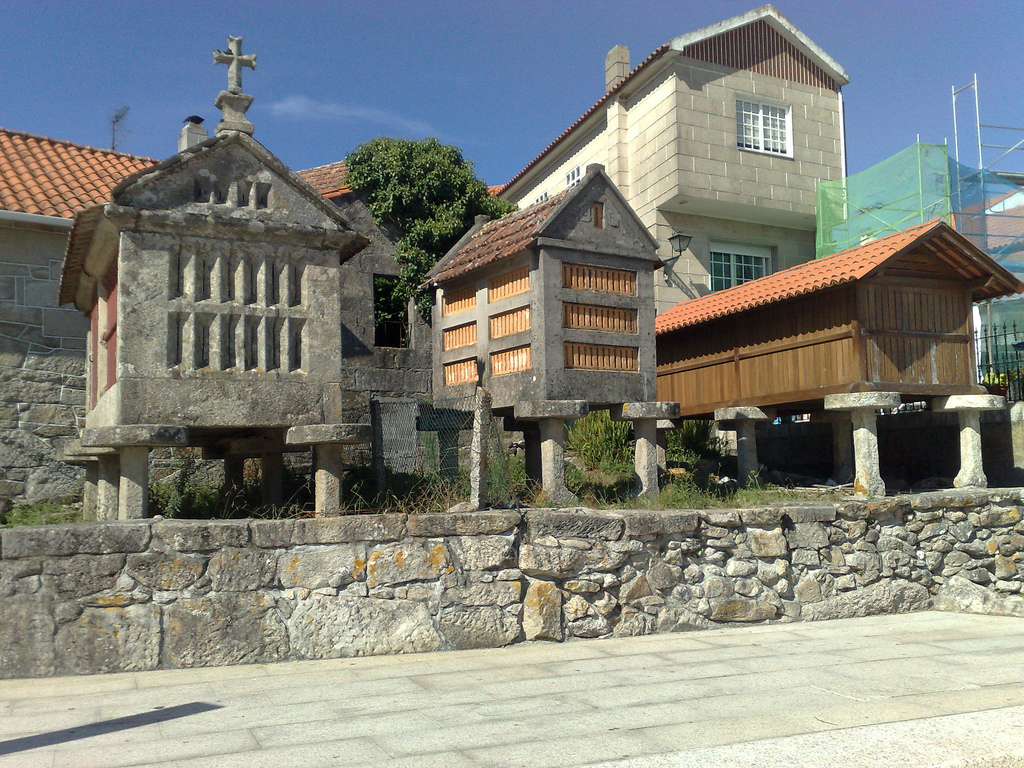
Horreos in Combarro, Galicia.

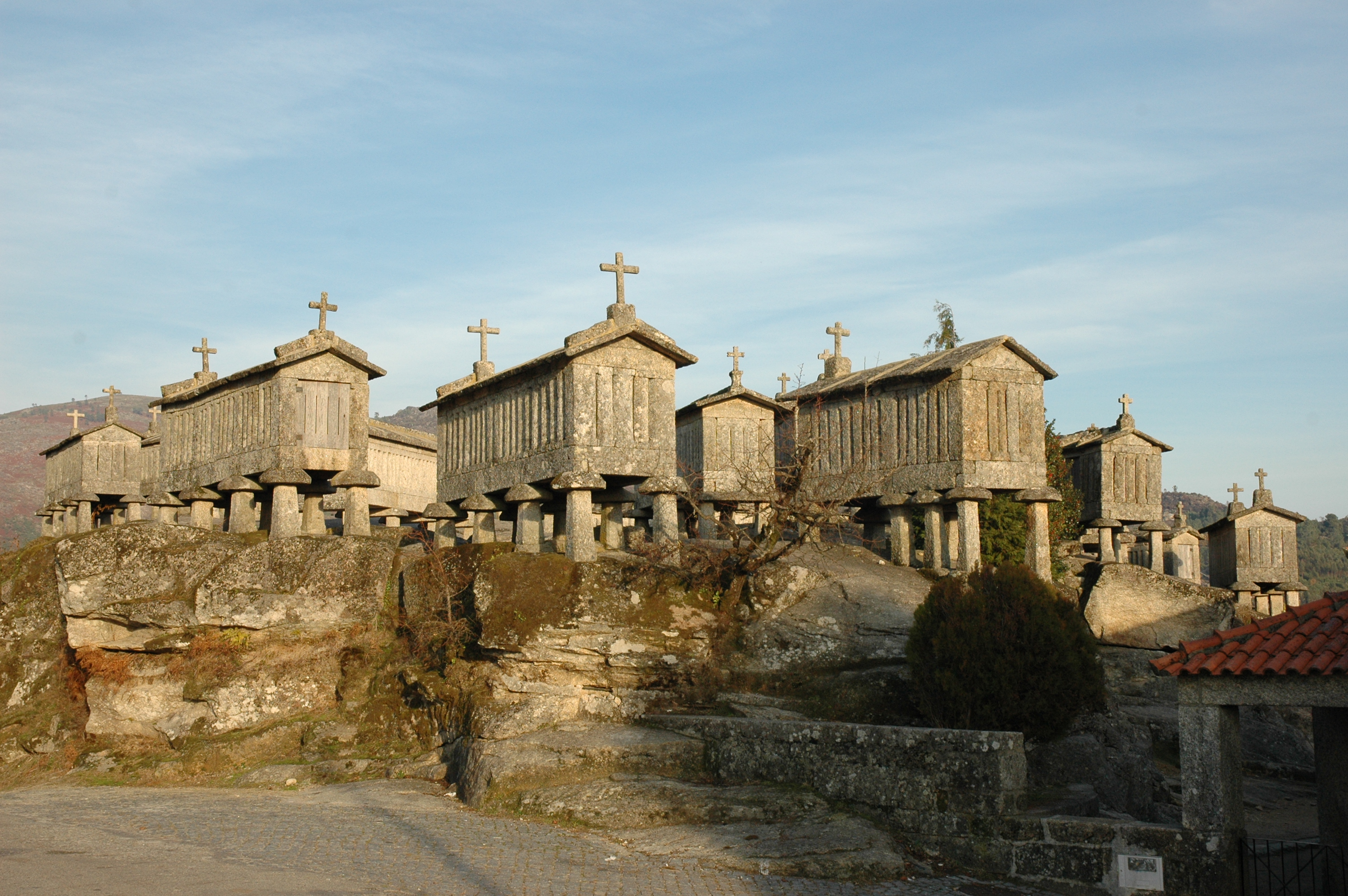
Espigueiros in Soajo, Portugal.

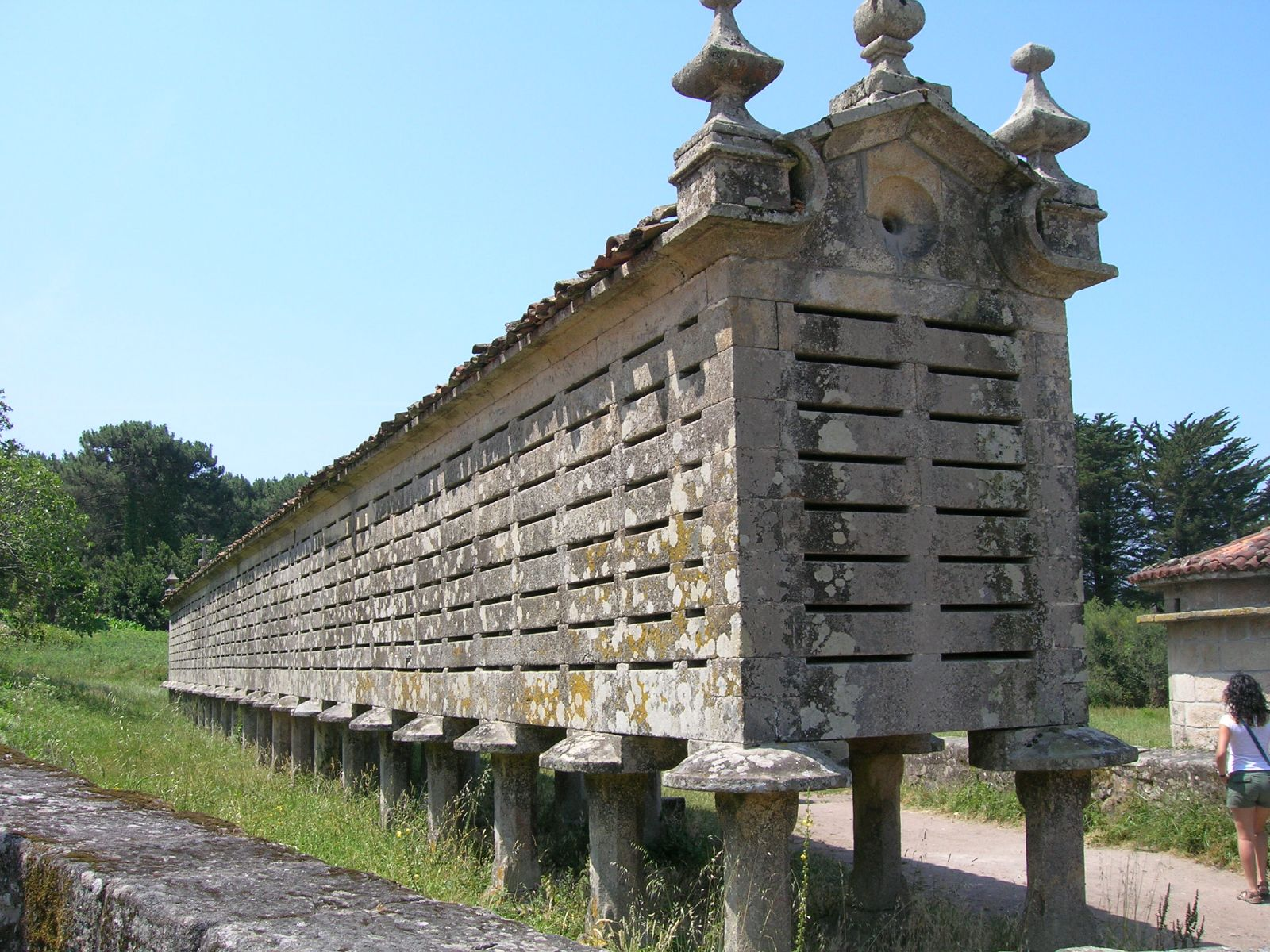
Horreo over pillars in Carnota, Galicia.

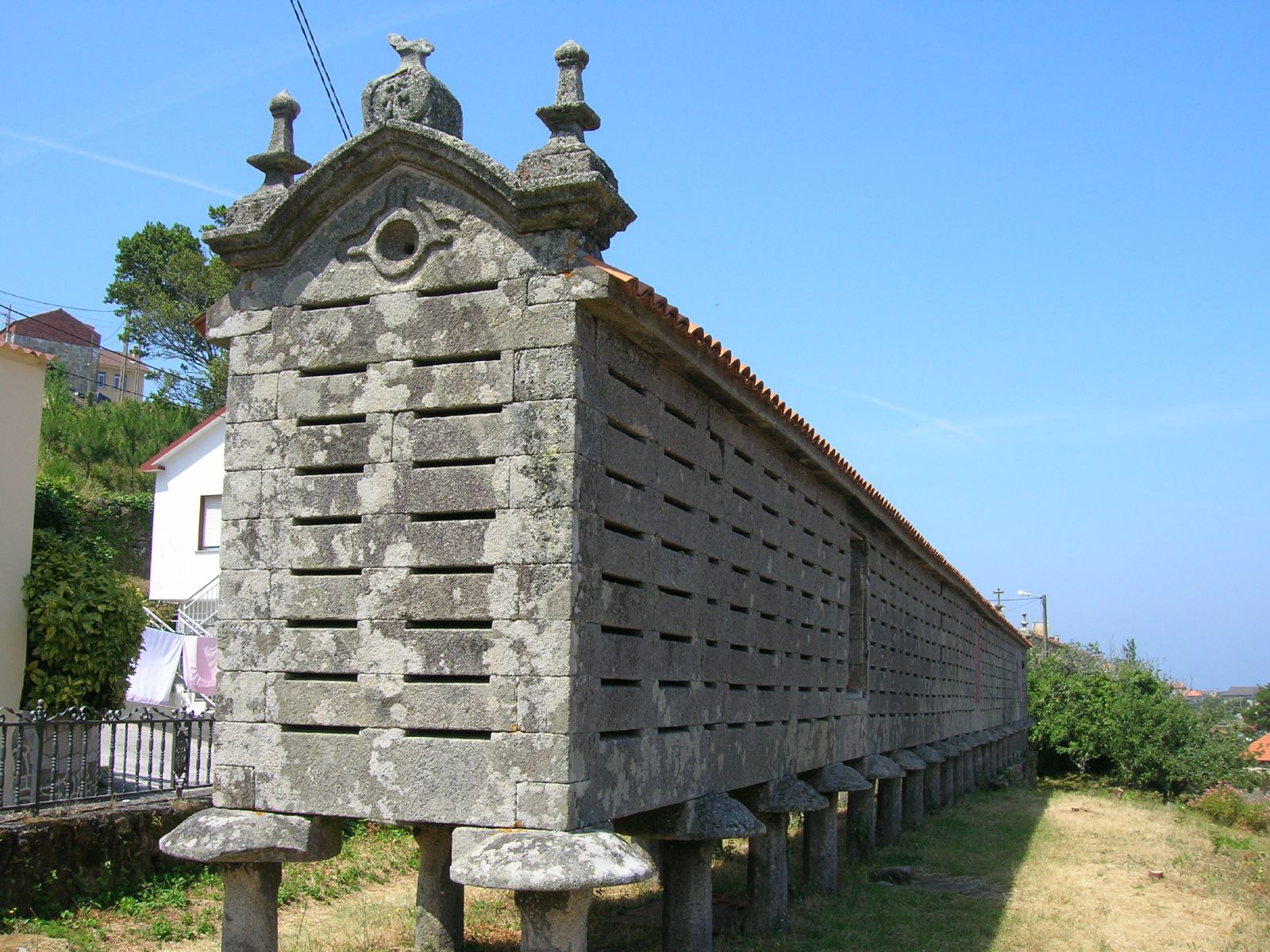
Horreo over pillars and slab in Lira, Galicia.

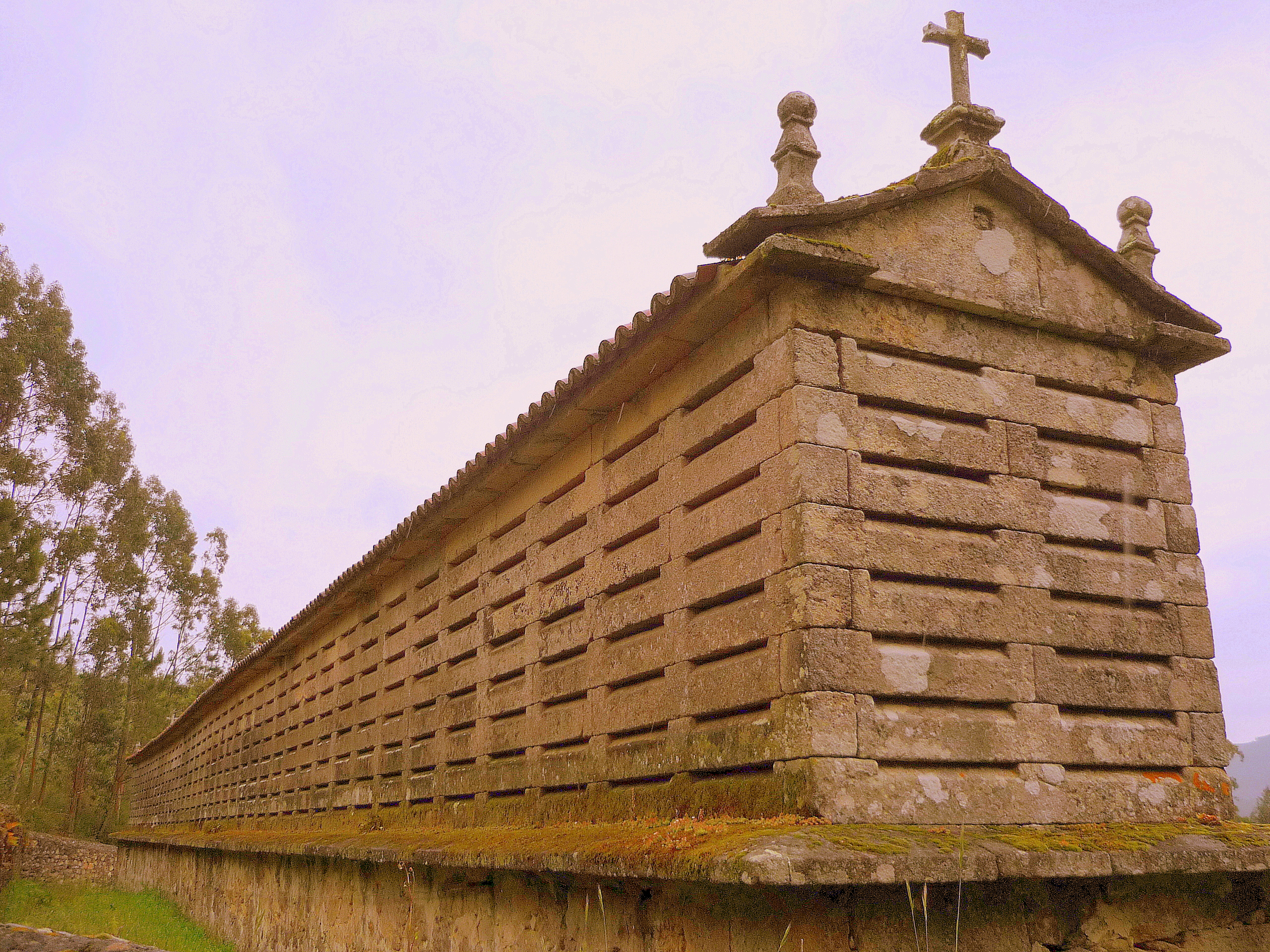
Horreo over barn in Rianxo, Galicia.

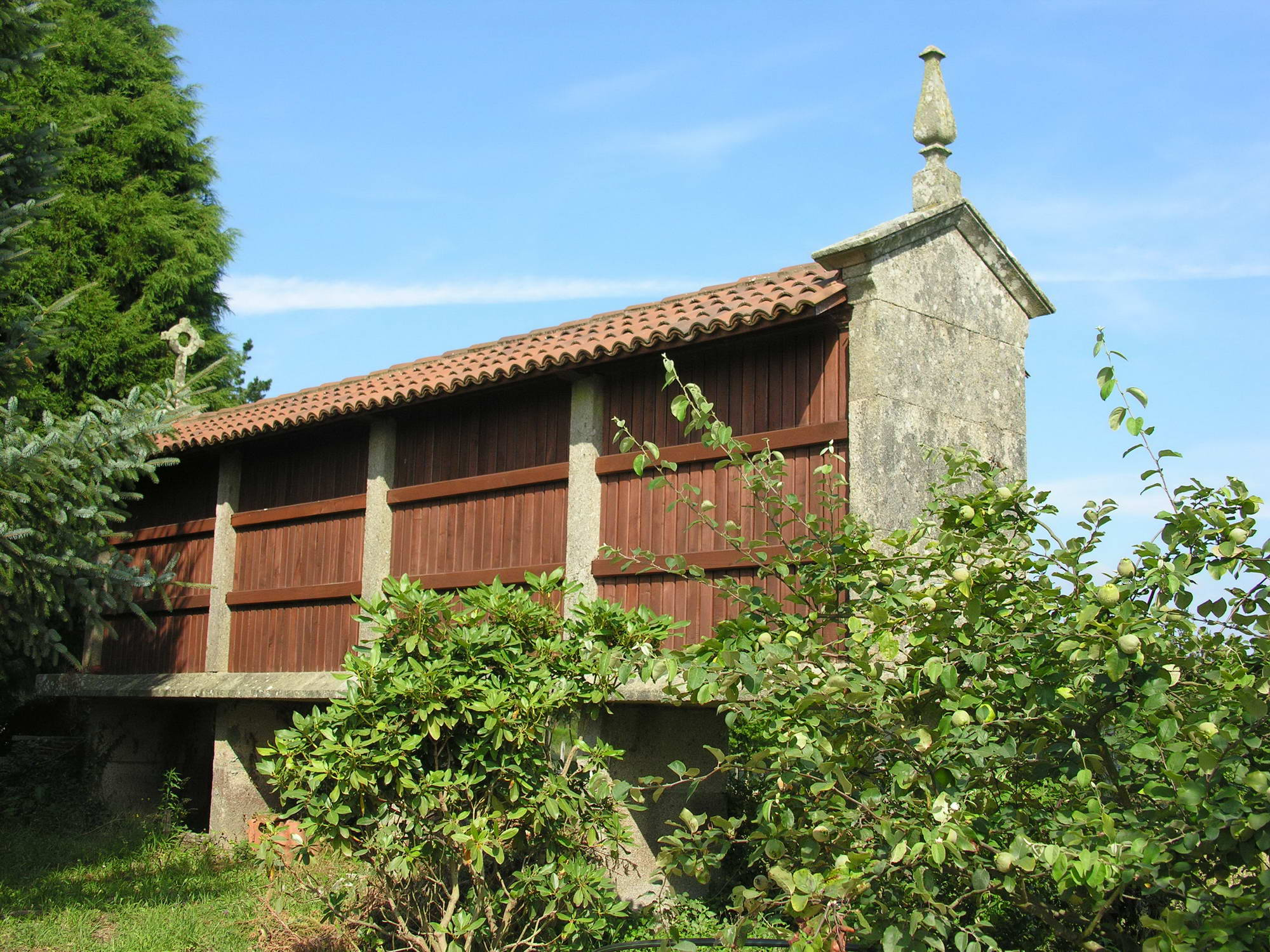
Horreo over masonry strains in Oroso, Galicia.

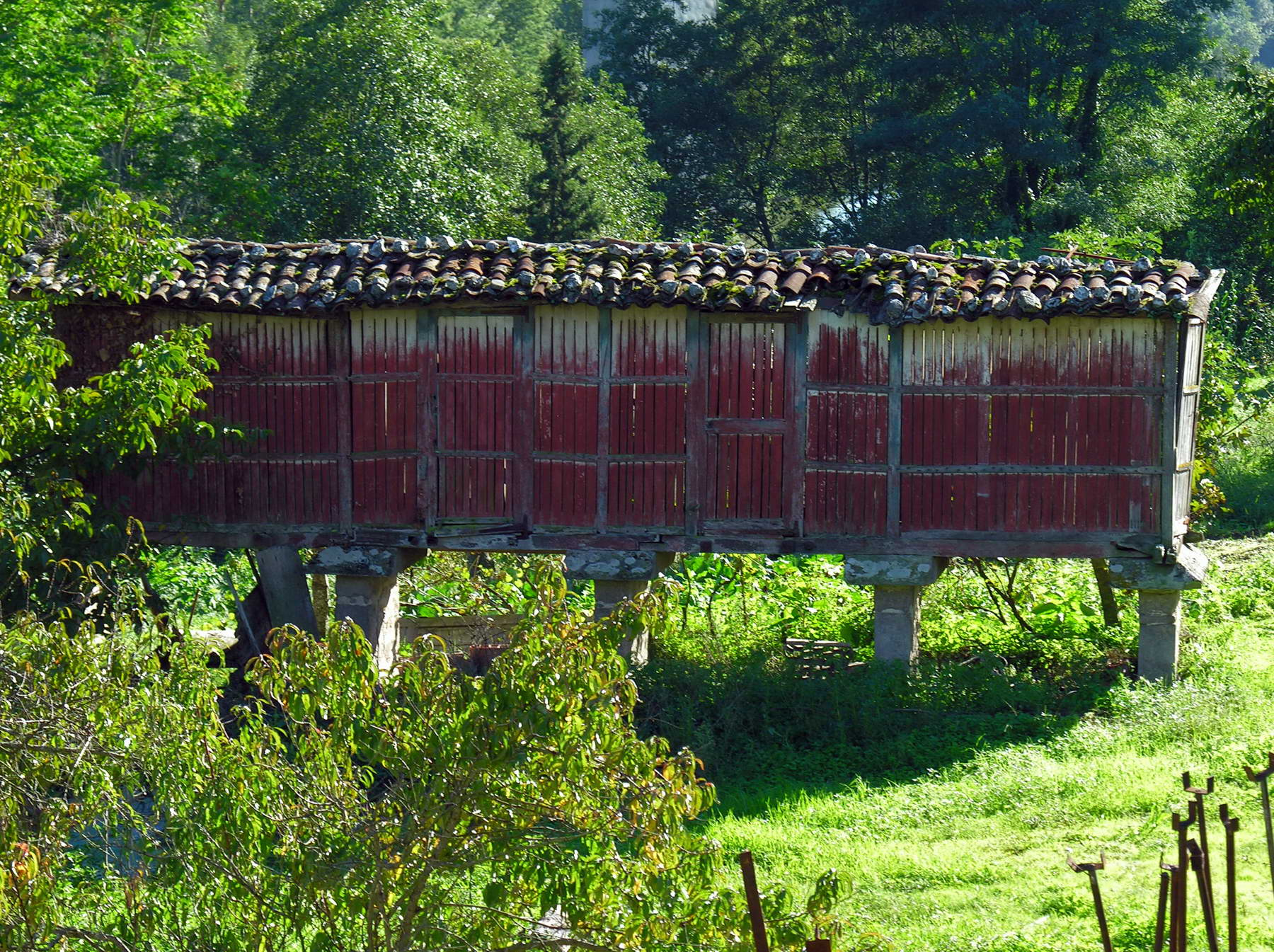
Wooden horreo over masonry strains in Vedra, Galicia.

Parts of the Asturian horru

== Similar granaries in Europe ==
Similar granaries were common throughout Atlantic Europe: Northwest Iberian Peninsula, France, the British Isles, Scandinavia.

French Savoy has its regard, also encountered in the Swiss Valais (raccard) and the Italian Aosta Valley (rascard). Norway has its stabbur, Sweden its härbre or more precisely stolphärbre or stolpbod. Hambars are found in the Balkans, and serender in northern Turkey.

Similar buildings (barns) on staddle stones are found in Southern England.

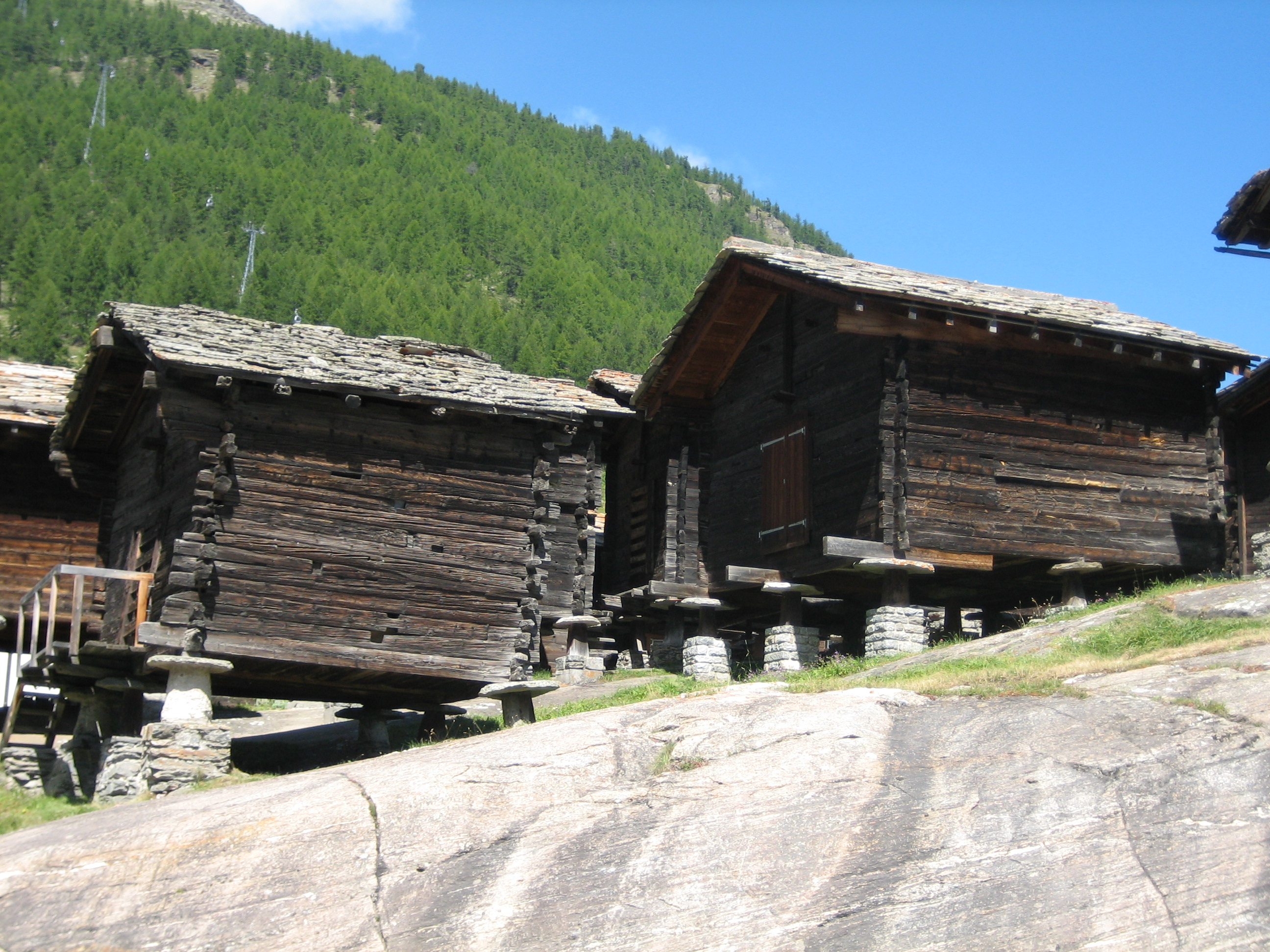
Raccards in Valais, Switzerland

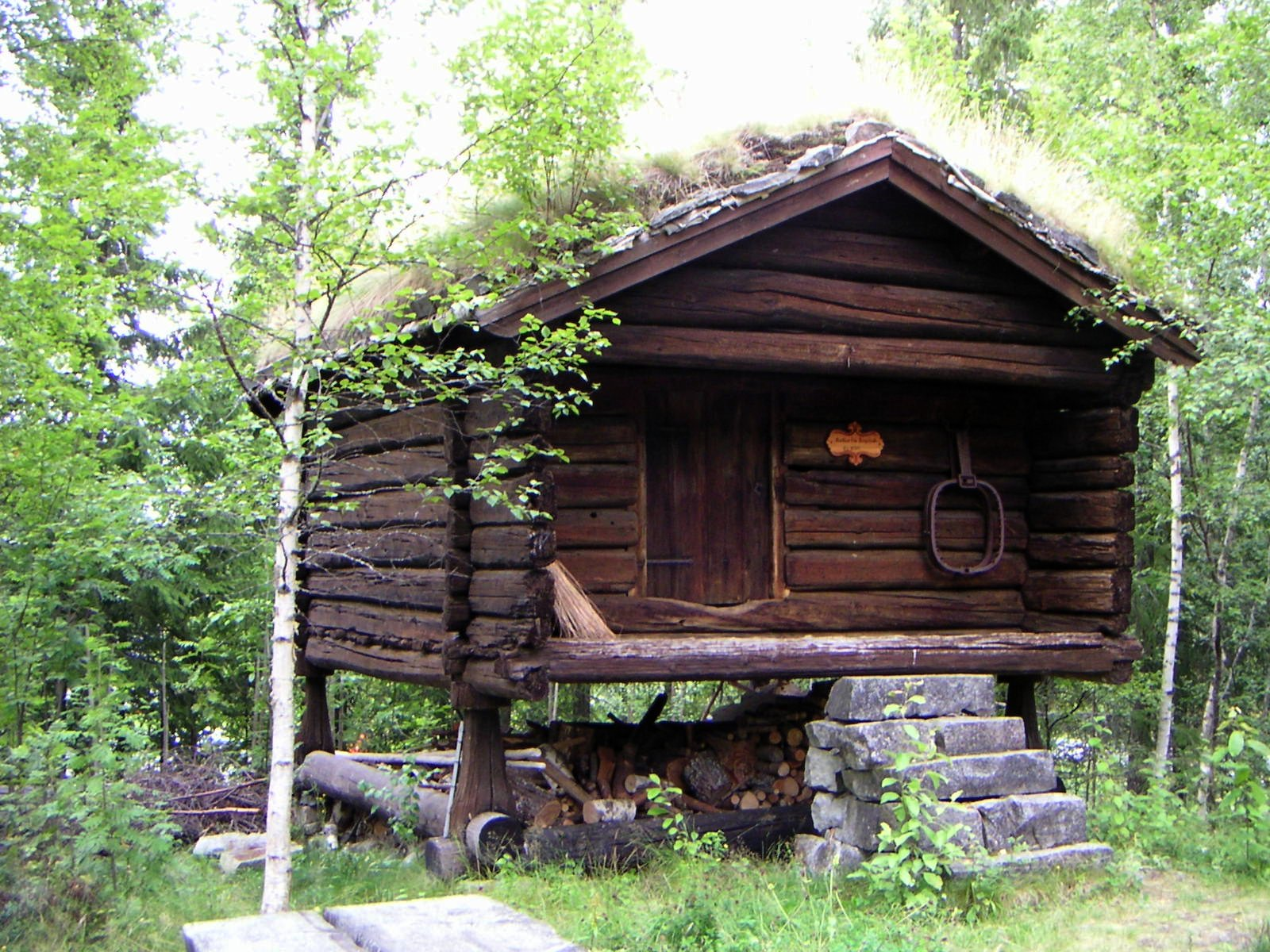
Stabbur originally from Bergsrud in Sør-Aurdal, Norway, later relocated to the Bautahaugen Samlinger

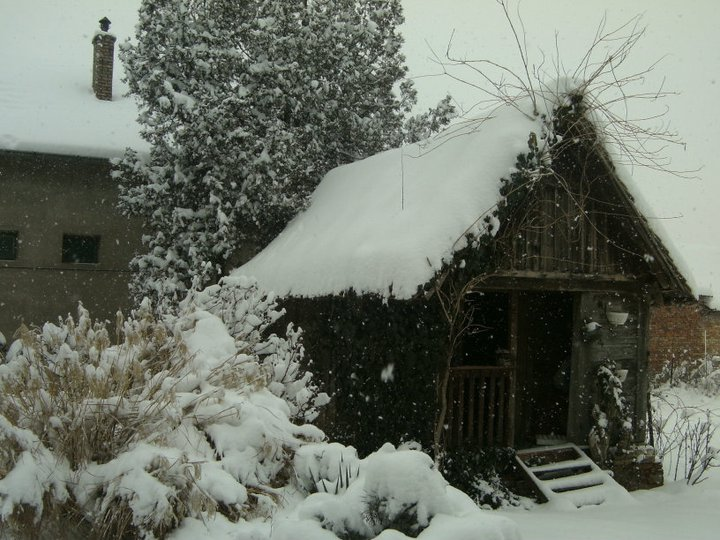
Ambar from 1888 in Banovci, Croatia, during winter

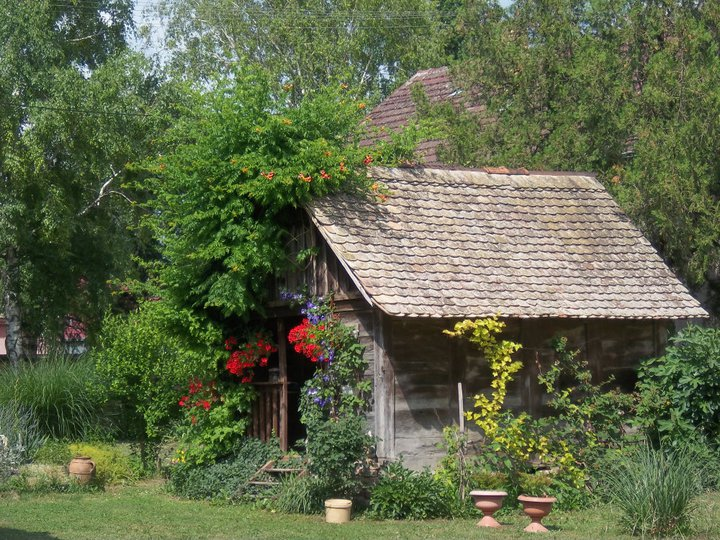
Ambar from 1888 in Banovci, Croatia, during summer

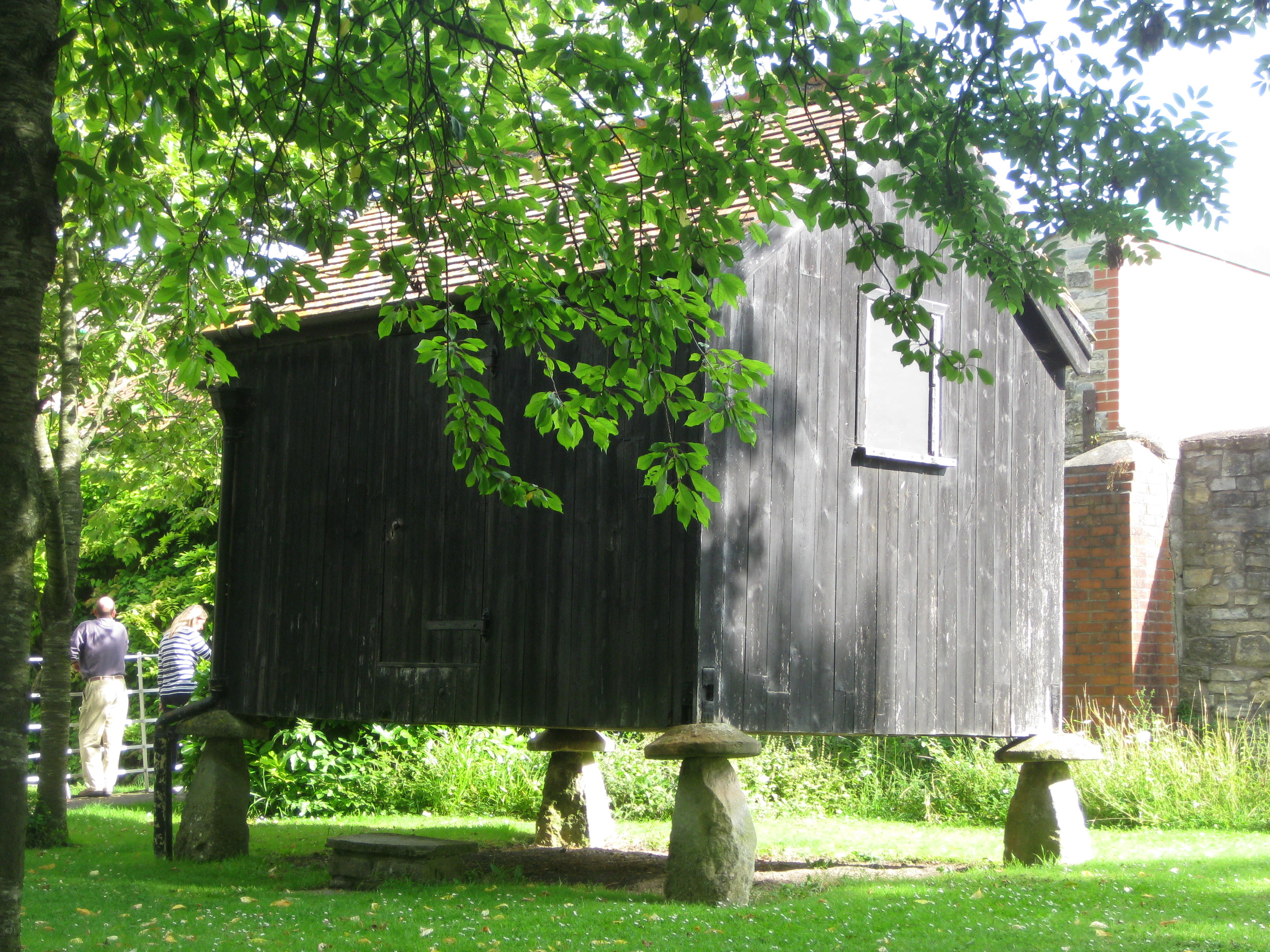
Building sitting on staddle stones, at the Somerset Rural Life Museum, similar to Iberian hórreos.

== See also ==
- Raccard
- Hambar
- Horreum
- Corn crib
