= Welded wire mesh fence =

Type of steel fence

Welded wire mesh fence is a steel fence consisting of wire strands electrically welded together to form a high strength mesh. The fencing is available in two formats: rolled mesh and rigid mesh. Over the last 30 years rigid mesh fencing has become the system of choice for demarcation across the UK, Europe and Australia, in construction, civil utilities and temporary works.

Welded wire mesh fences are used predominantly as high security barriers where visibility through the fence is necessary or desirable. It is also used for animal enclosures in zoos.

The longest stretch of rigid mesh fencing in the UK is on the Norton Bridge Flyover, with a continuous fence of 5.5 km.

== Types ==
=== Styles ===
- Profiled Rigid Mesh Panels
- Double-Wire Rigid Mesh Panels (also known as Twin Wire)
- 358 Prison Mesh Panels

=== Finishes ===
- Powder coating
- Galvanization
- Painted or sprayed
- Stainless steel

=== By gauge ===
- Wire thickness: typically wire from 2mm to 8mm is used
- Horizontal wire pitch: the distance between two horizontal wire strands, typically 12.7mm to 200mm
- Vertical wire pitch: the distance between two vertical wire strands, typically 10mm to 76.2mm

== Uses ==
- Around public buildings, such as the Union Buildings in Pretoria
- Around private offices, where visibility is desirable
- Residential perimeter fence
- Around prisons, secure hospitals and military installations
- Country borders
- In parks, zoos and nature reserves
