= Raccard =

Traditional granaries

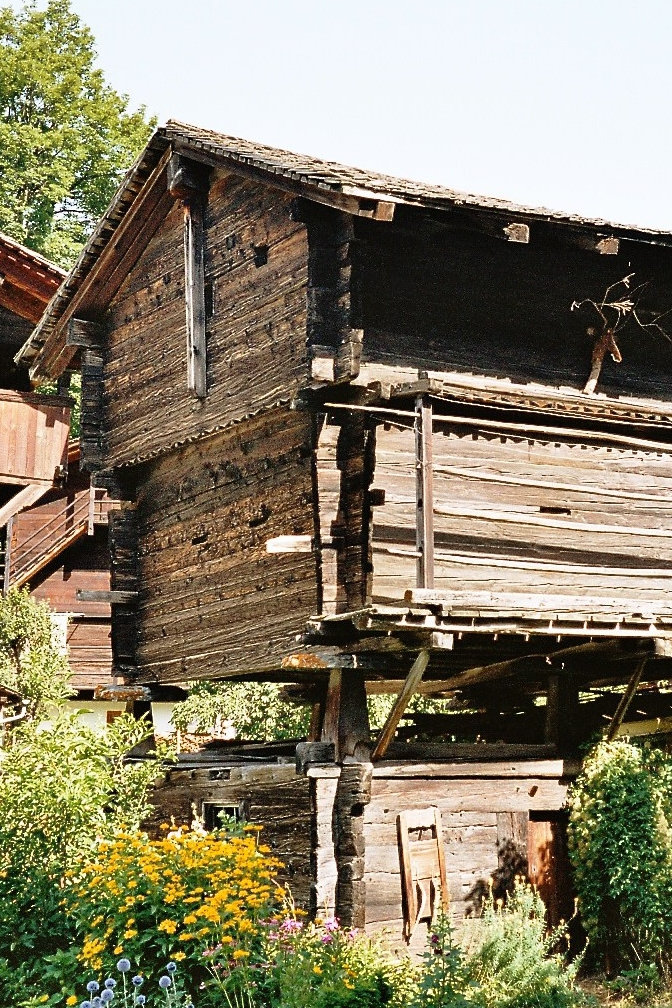
A raccard in the village of Fiesch, Valais

Raccards are traditional granaries that can be found in the Swiss Alps (usually in Valais) and in the Italian Alps (in the Lys Valley, Valsesia, and in Ayas). In Italy they are called rascard or torbe and in Savoy regard. They are also found in the Aosta Valley and Piedmont regions of Italy. Raccards share similarities with the horreos found in the northwest of the Iberian Peninsula.

These pre-industrial structures resemble log cabins, built above ground and supported by wooden stilts. A circular stone slab, forming an overhang, is intercalated between the stilts and the granary to prevent rodents from gaining access to the grain or fodder reserves. Raccards allow for preserving and processing grain products.

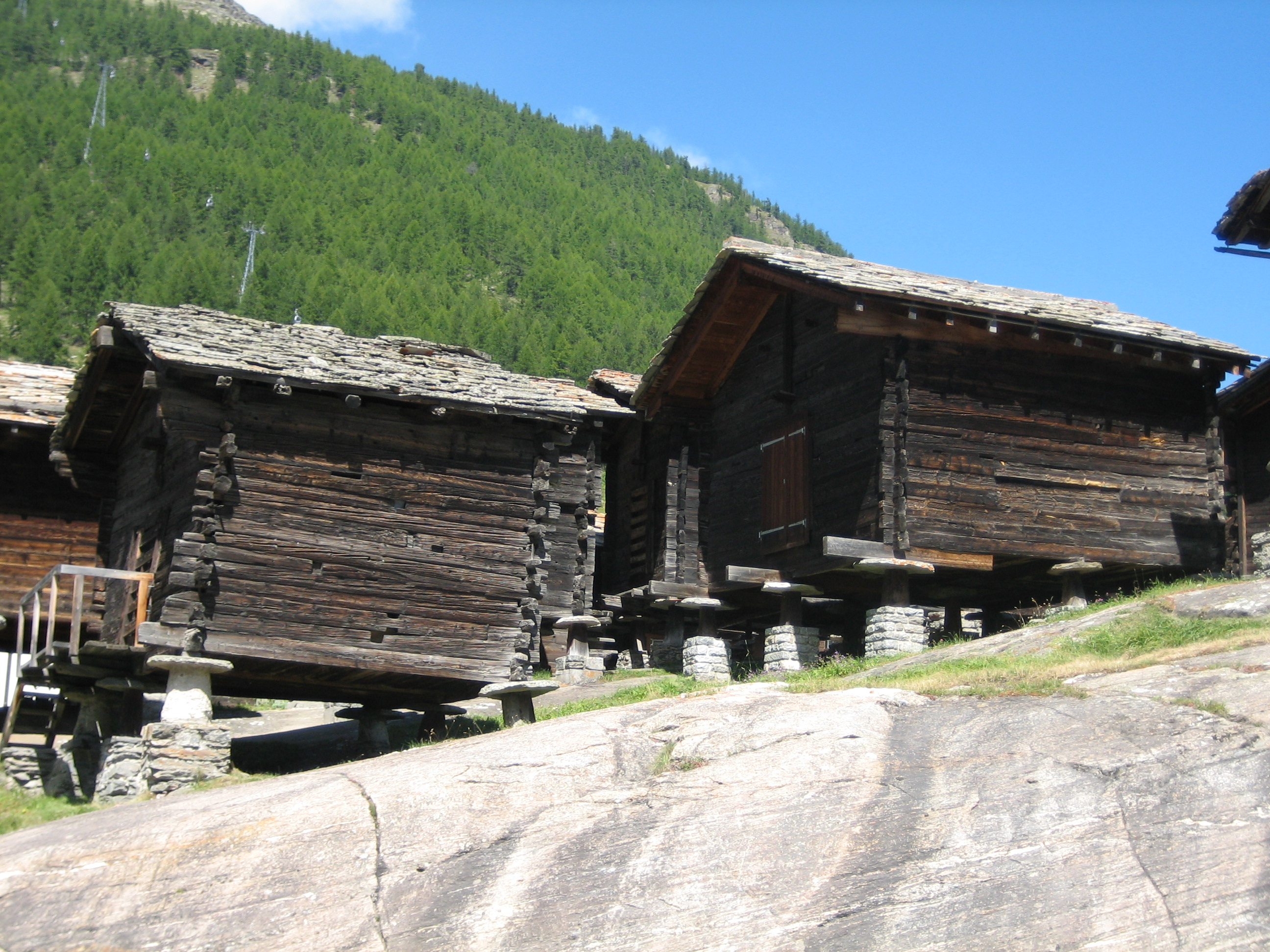
Raccards in Saas-Fee

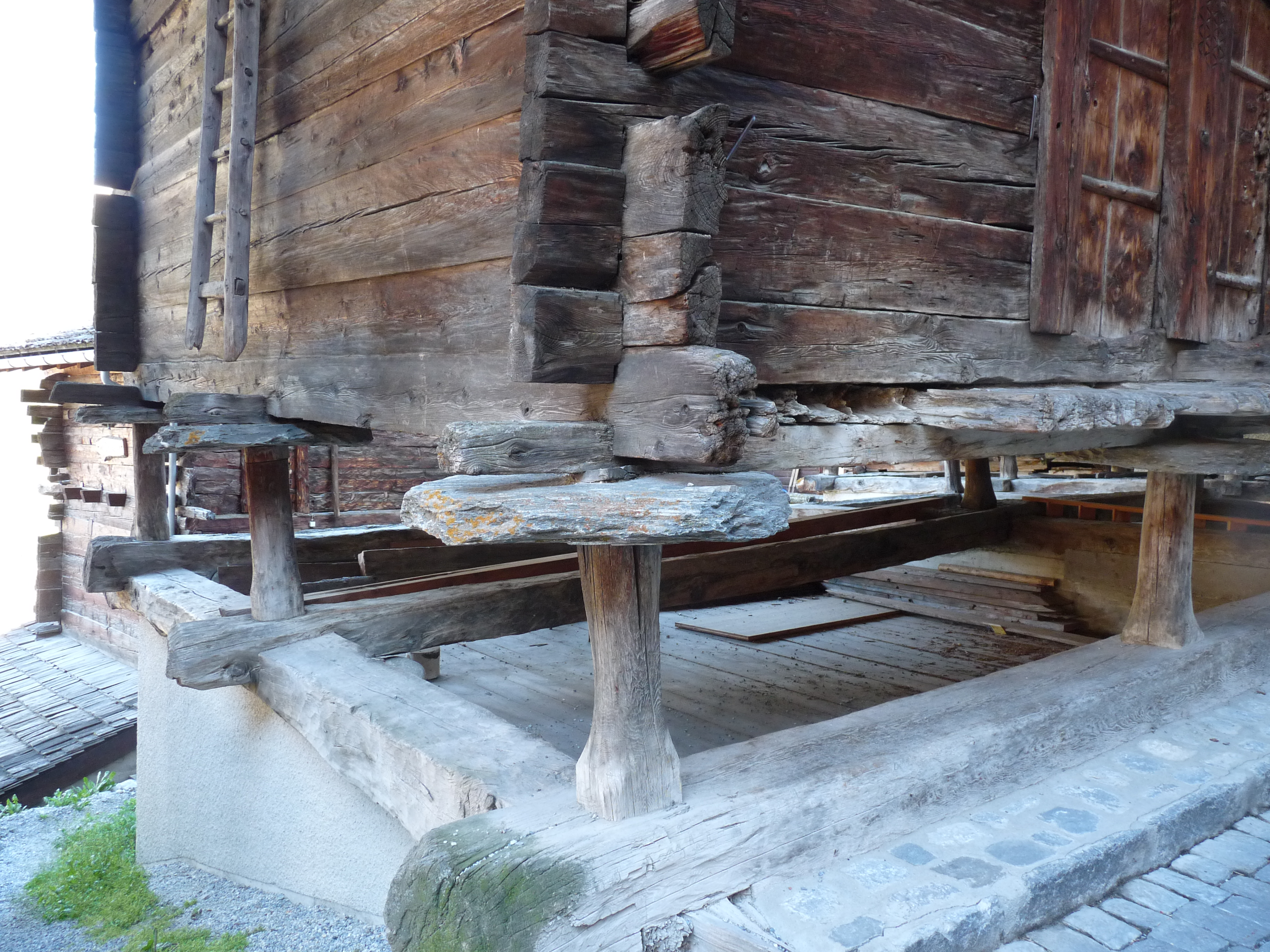
Raccard in Grimentz - a view of the stone slabs which prevent rodent incursions.

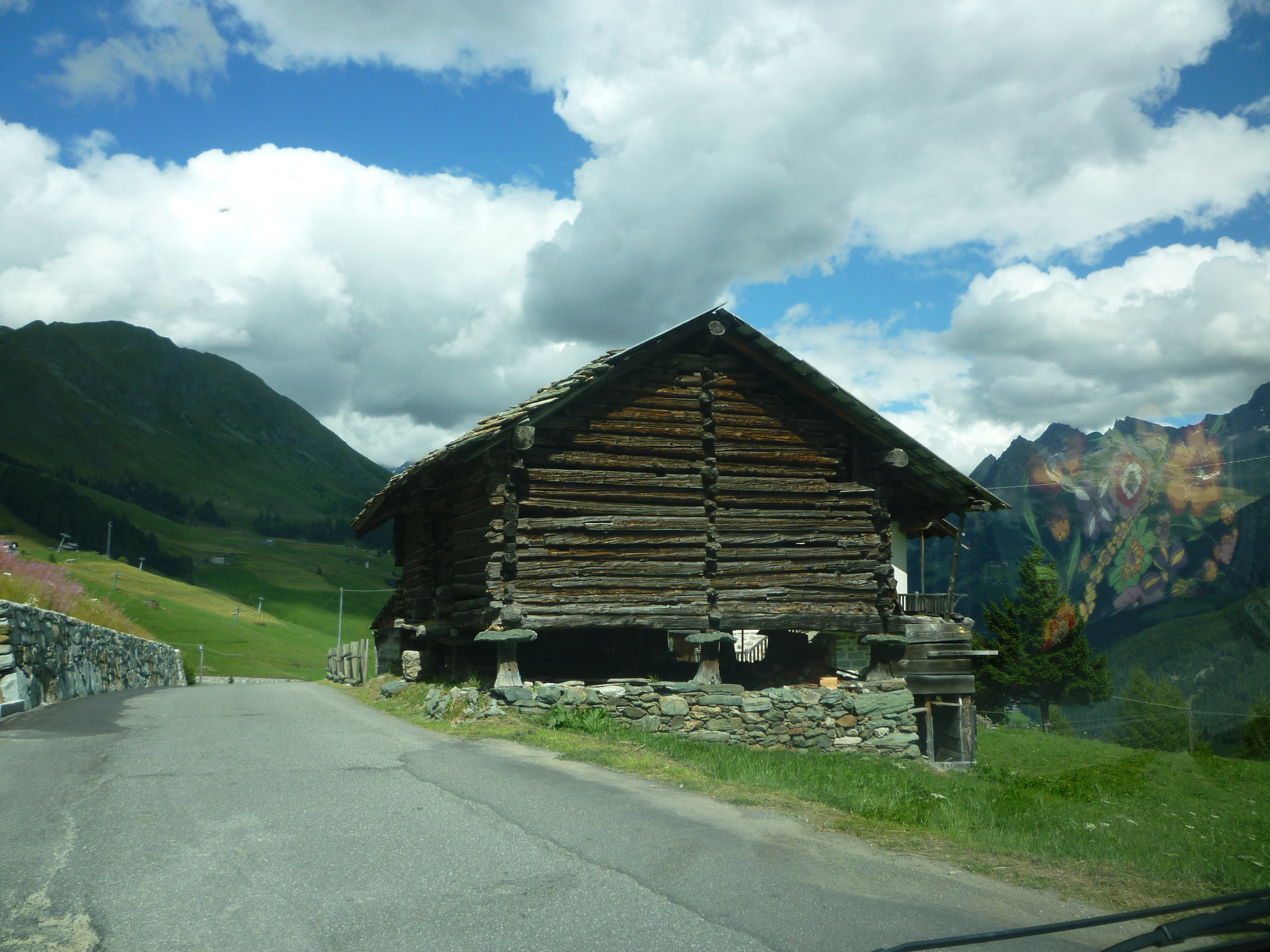
Rascard in Ayas

== See also ==
- Hórreo
