= Outbuilding =

Accessory structures on farm or ranch

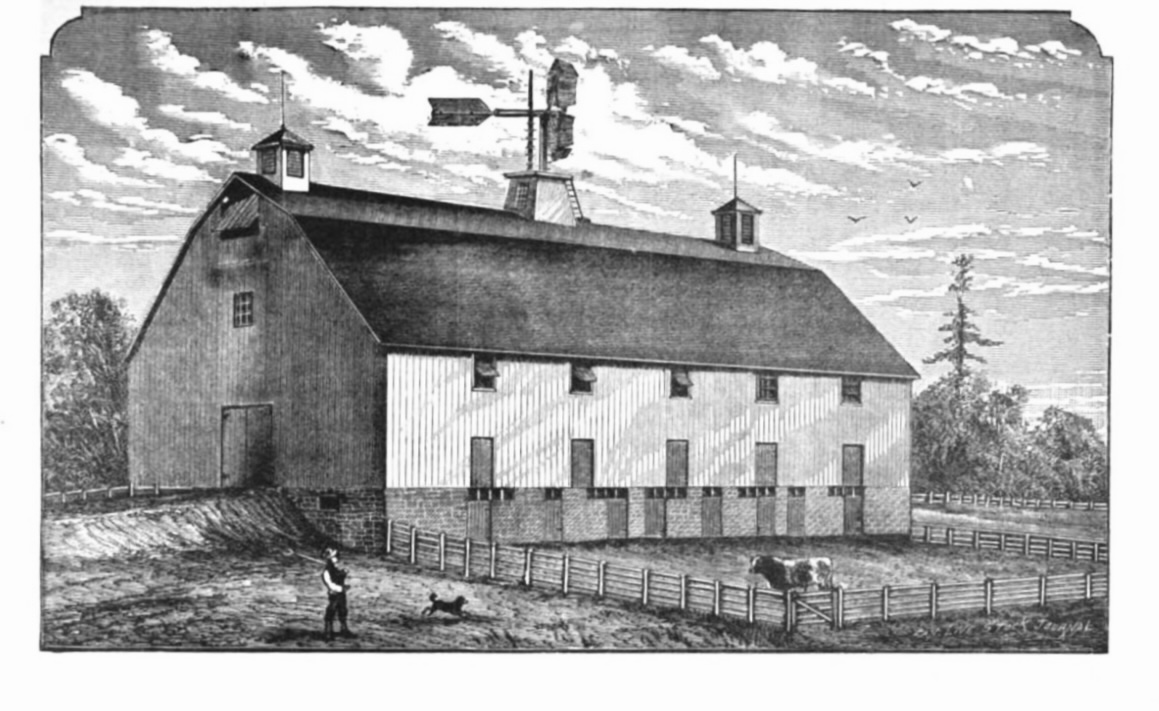
Etching of a Canadian barn (1888)

An outbuilding, sometimes called an accessory building or a dependency, is a building that is part of a residential or agricultural complex but detached from the main sleeping and eating areas. Outbuildings are generally used for some practical purpose, rather than decoration or purely for leisure (such as a pool house or a tree house), although luxury greenhouses such as orangeries or ferneries may also be considered outbuildings. This article is limited to buildings that would typically serve one property, separate from community-scale structures such as gristmills, water towers, fire towers, or parish granaries. Outbuildings are typically detached from the main structure, so places like wine cellars, root cellars and cheese caves may or may not be termed outbuildings depending on their placement. A buttery, on the other hand, is never an outbuilding because by definition is it is integrated into the main structure.

Separating these work spaces from the main home "removed heat, obnoxious odors, and offending vermin" and decreased the risk of house fires and food-borne illnesses. The study of historical outbuildings also offers information about the lives of workers otherwise excluded from the history of a place, since one possible purpose of an outbuilding was to reinforce class boundaries.

Outbuildings are typically constructed in a vernacular architectural style. Outbuildings can be valuable resources for architectural historians as they may "offer insight unavailable in traditional documentary sources." Architectural historian William Tishler argues that in addition to documenting outbuildings, researchers need to inspect attics and basements "because it's there that you see how things are put together."

Researchers studying detached kitchens in Wiltshire identified some common characteristics of the outbuildings: non-standard floor plans, no large windows, location near the main house, footprint smaller than main house, and little or no interior ornamentation.

Good farming and good outbuildings are invariably associated.

— Thomas Shaw, editor of Canadian Live Stock Journal (1888)

== Types ==
- Bunkhouses
- Slave quarters
- Tenant housing
- Itinerant labor housing
- Bothies
- Wash houses
- Saunas
- Lavoirs (laundries)
- Wood sheds
- Radio shacks
- Barns, possibly incorporating haylofts and/or outdoor animal pens
- Stables for horses
- Mangers
- Hay barracks
- Outhouses or privies
- Spring houses
- Ice houses
- Pump houses or windpumps
- Tankhouses
- Summer kitchens, detached kitchens, cookhouses, dirty kitchens, etc.
- Bake ovens
- Smokehouses
- Root cellars
- Cold storage
- Pit-houses
- Dugout (shelter)
- Wine cellars and wine caves
- Cheese caves
- Butcher houses (after an outdoor slaughter, preparing the cuts of meat for long-term storage would take place in a butcher house)
- Poultry houses
- Pigpens or piggeries
- Milkhouses or dairy barns
- Shearing sheds
- Dovecotes, columbaria, pigeonniers
- Dog houses, kennels
- Siloes
- Granaries grain bins
- Corn cribs
- Rice barns, winnowing barns
- Hemp-processing houses
- Threshing barns
- Potato houses
- Greenhouses
- Illicit grow houses (marijuana, psilocybin mushrooms, et al.)
- Detached conservatories, orangeries, walipinis, pineapple pits, ferneries, etc.
- Coach houses
- Machine houses and tool sheds
- Packhouses
- Drying sheds, dry houses
- Kilns
- Forges or smithies
- Sugar shacks
- Oast houses, malt houses
- Cider houses
- Still sheds
- Tobacco barns
- Gin house (for a cotton gin)
- Guard houses
- Guest houses
- Workshops
- shed
- Detached garages
- Scale sheds
- Roadside stands
- Garage
- Storage room
- Ware house

== Barn subtypes ==
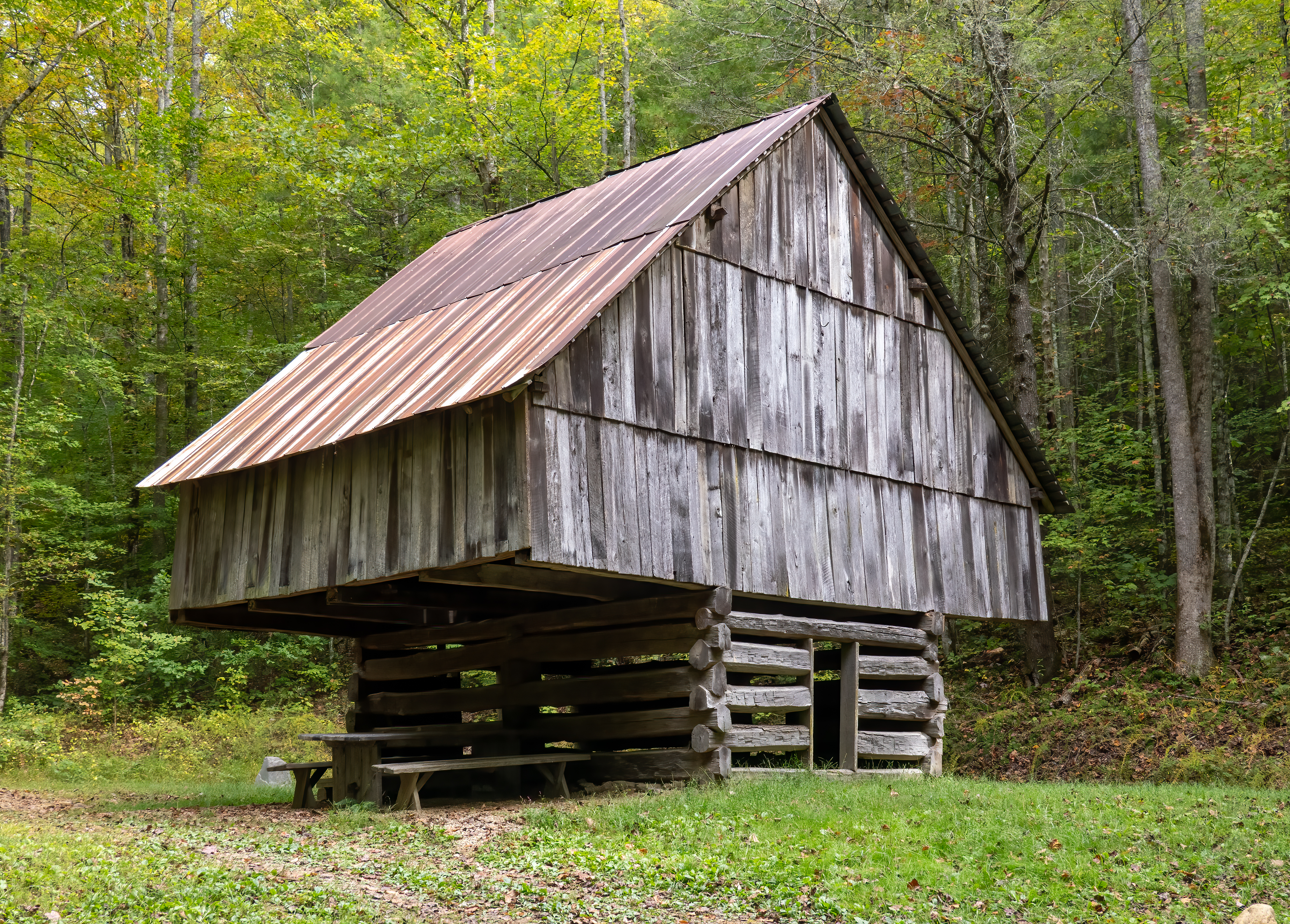
Cantilever barn in Tennessee

Barns have been classified by their function, structure, location, or other features. Sometimes the same building falls into multiple categories.

- Apple barn or fruit barn – for the storage of fruit crops
- Bank barn – A multilevel building built into a banking so the upper floor is accessible to a wagon, sometimes accessed by a bridge or ramp.
- Bastle house – a defensive structure to guard against raiders with accommodation on the lower floor for livestock.
- Bridge barn or covered bridge barn – general terms for barns accessed by a bridge rather than a ramp.
- Boô – A sheep-barn and dwelling in the Netherlands, seasonal or sometimes year round.
- Pennsylvania barn (U.S.) of which there are sub-categories such as standard and sweitzer types. Also known as forebay or porch barns.
- Cantilever barn – a type of log crib barn with cantilevered upper floors which developed in Appalachia (U.S.A.)
- Combination barn – found throughout England, especially in areas of pastoral farming and the standard barn type in America. This general term means the barns were used for both crop storage and as a byre to house animals.
- Crib barn – Horizontal log structures with up to four cribs (assemblies of crossing timbers) found primarily in the southern U.S.A.
- Drying barns for drying crops in Finland and Sweden are called riihi and ria, respectively.
- New World Dutch Barn – A barn type in the U.S. Also see Dutch barn (U.K.) in Other farm buildings section below.
- Field barn – An outbuilding located in a field further afield than the main cluster of buildings that constitute a farmstead
- New England barn – a common style of barn found in rural New England and in the U.S.
- English barn (U.S.), also called a Yankee or Connecticut barn – A widespread barn type in the U.S.
- Granary – to store grain after it is threshed, some barns contain a room called a granary, some barns like a rice barn blur the line between a barn and granary.
- Gothic arch barn, has profile shaped as a Gothic arch, which became feasible to be formed by laminated members
- Ground stable barn, a barn with space for livestock at ground level
- Housebarn, also called a byre-dwelling – A combined living space and barn, relatively common in old Europe but rare in North America. Also, longhouses were housebarns.
- Pole barn – a simple structure that consists of poles embedded in the ground to support a roof, with or without exterior walls. The pole barn lacks a conventional foundation, thus greatly reducing construction costs. Traditionally used to house livestock, hay or equipment.
- Potato barn or potato house– A semi-subterranean or two story building for storage of potatoes or sweet potatoes.
- Prairie barn – A general term for barns in the Western U.S.
- Rice barn and the related winnowing barn
- Round barn, built in a round shape the term often is generalized to the include polygonal barn and octagonal barn
- Schapenboet – a traditional agricultural outbuilding found on the island of Texel, in the province of North Holland, the Netherlands. Although schapen means sheep, schapenboeten mainly served as storage spaces for hay, tools, and agricultural equipment.
- Swing beam barn – A rare barn type in part of the U.S. designed for threshing with animals walking around a pole held by a swing beam inside the barn.
- Tobacco barn – for drying of tobacco leaves
- Tithe barn – a type of barn used in much of northern Europe in the Middle Ages for storing the tithes—a tenth of the farm's produce which had to be given to the church
- Threshing barn – built with a threshing floor for the processing and storage of cereals, to keep them in dry conditions. Characterised by large double doors in the centre of one side, a smaller one on the other, and storage for cereal harvest or unprocessed on either side. In England the grain was beaten from the crop by flails and then separated from the husks by winnowing between these doors. The design of these typically remained unchanged between the 12th and 19th centuries. The large doors allow for a horse wagon to be driven through; the smaller ones allow for the sorting of sheep and other stock in the spring and summer.

== See also ==
- Well
- Cistern
- Croft
- Connected farm
- Barnyard
- Shed
- Hut
- Lean-to
- Pergola
- Outhouse, an external toilet
- Category:Pastoral shelters
- Chashitsu (Japanese tea houses)
- Grillkota (Scandinavian grillhouses)

=== Derivative extravagance ===
- Folly
- Garden hermit
- Hameau de la Reine
