= Field barn =

Type of agricultural building

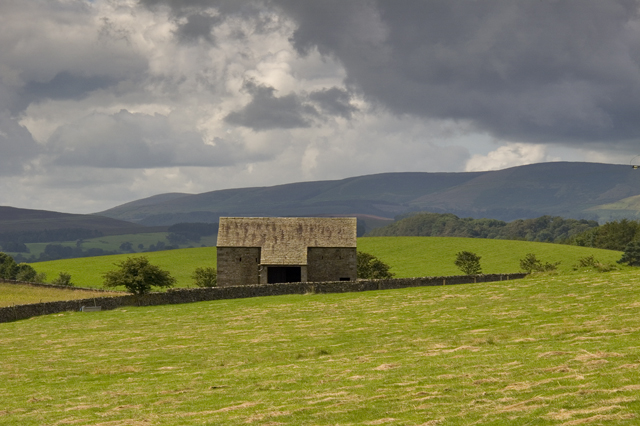
Field barn near Langcliff Cross, UK

A field barn is an outbuilding located in a field, some distance ("further afield") from farmer's residence or the main cluster of buildings that constitute a farmstead. Field barns were necessary when arable fields or valuable pastures were located some distance from a village or the residences of the agricultural workers who tended the fields. Rather than "commuting" back and forth to the field with livestock, tools, or harvests, the field barn allowed on-site storage (usually of straw, hay, and additional feed), as well as providing shelter for herds during inclement weather or when pregnant cattle or sheep needed respite and a clean place to labor. Field barns were also used for the drying and curing of hay, which protected the nutritional content of the crop better than drying and curing in the field.

In English agricultural history, many farms ended up "pie-shaped" (in order to connect the farm to the central village) and field barns were constructed at the distant wide end. Early examples in Staffordshire were essentially just a shed, those latterly built often had a foldyard and an additional shelter shed. Field barn construction began to decline with the rise of mechanized threshing.

== Field barns in England ==
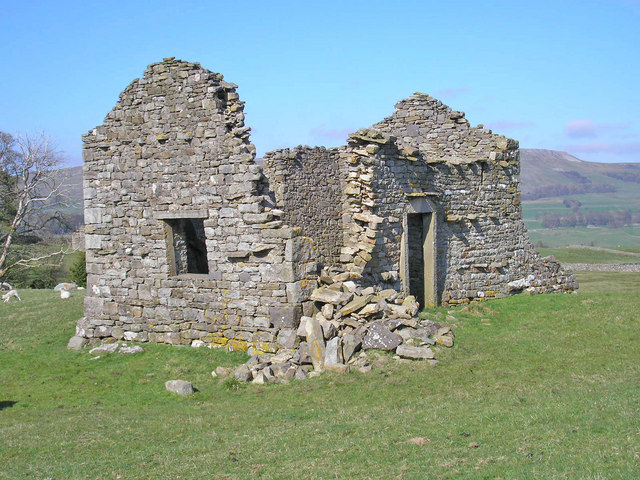
Stone field barn ruin in England

Historic England have been mapping field barns and outfarms across England and have noted that 72% have disappeared since 1900. They have confirmed the significance of these structures noting that:

- Examples dating back to the 18th century or earlier are very rare
- Some field barns and outfarms may provide evidence of former farmsteads where the farmhouse has been demolished following the amalgamation of farms.
- Field barns and outfarms are particularly vulnerable to dereliction once they are no longer in use.

Some county-based research projects have been carried out by the County Councils:

- The Suffolk County Council Archaeological Service's Farmsteads in the Suffolk Countryside Project found evidence for 265 field barns in Suffolk.

== Gallery ==
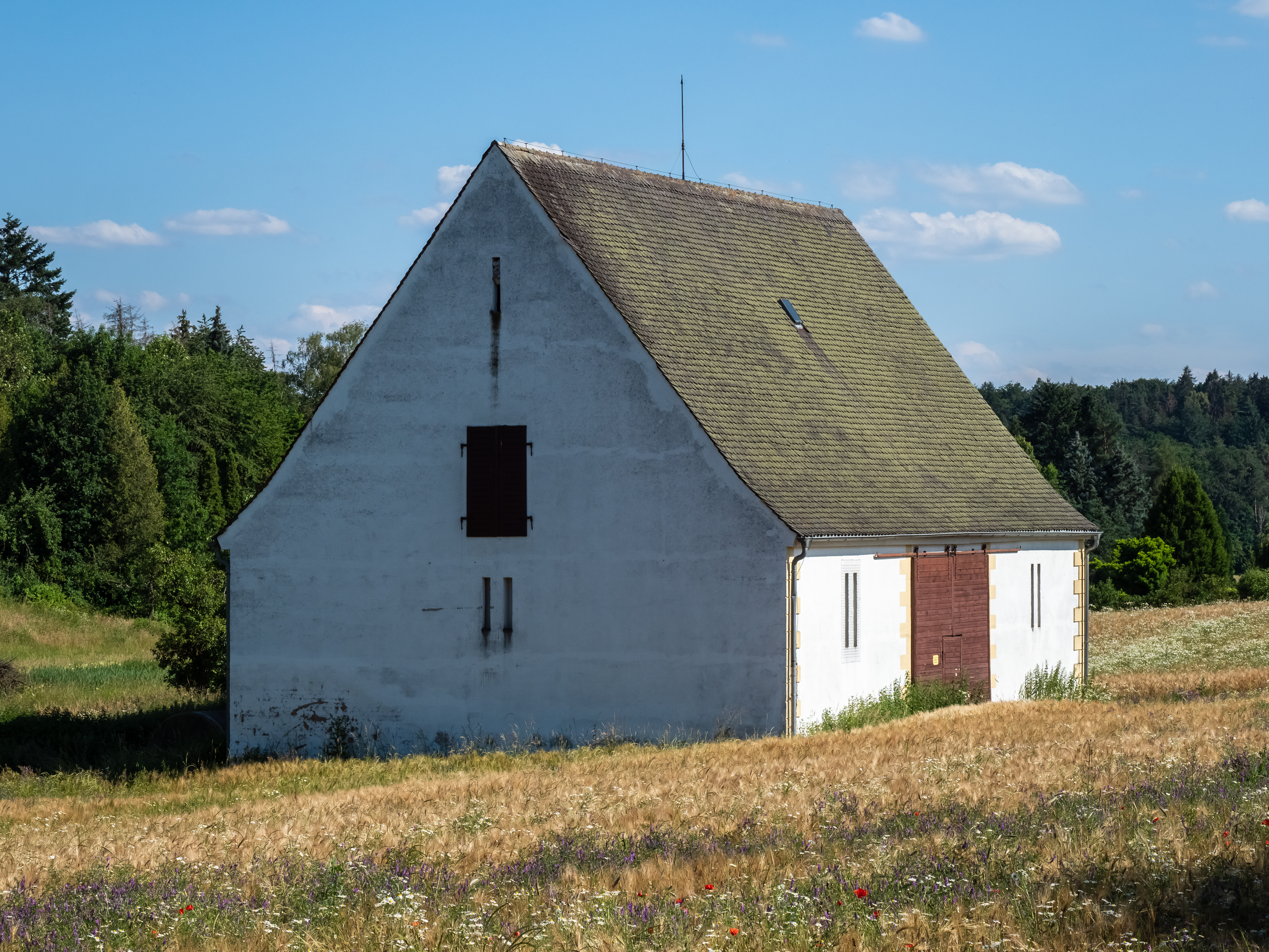
Field barn in Bamberg, Germany

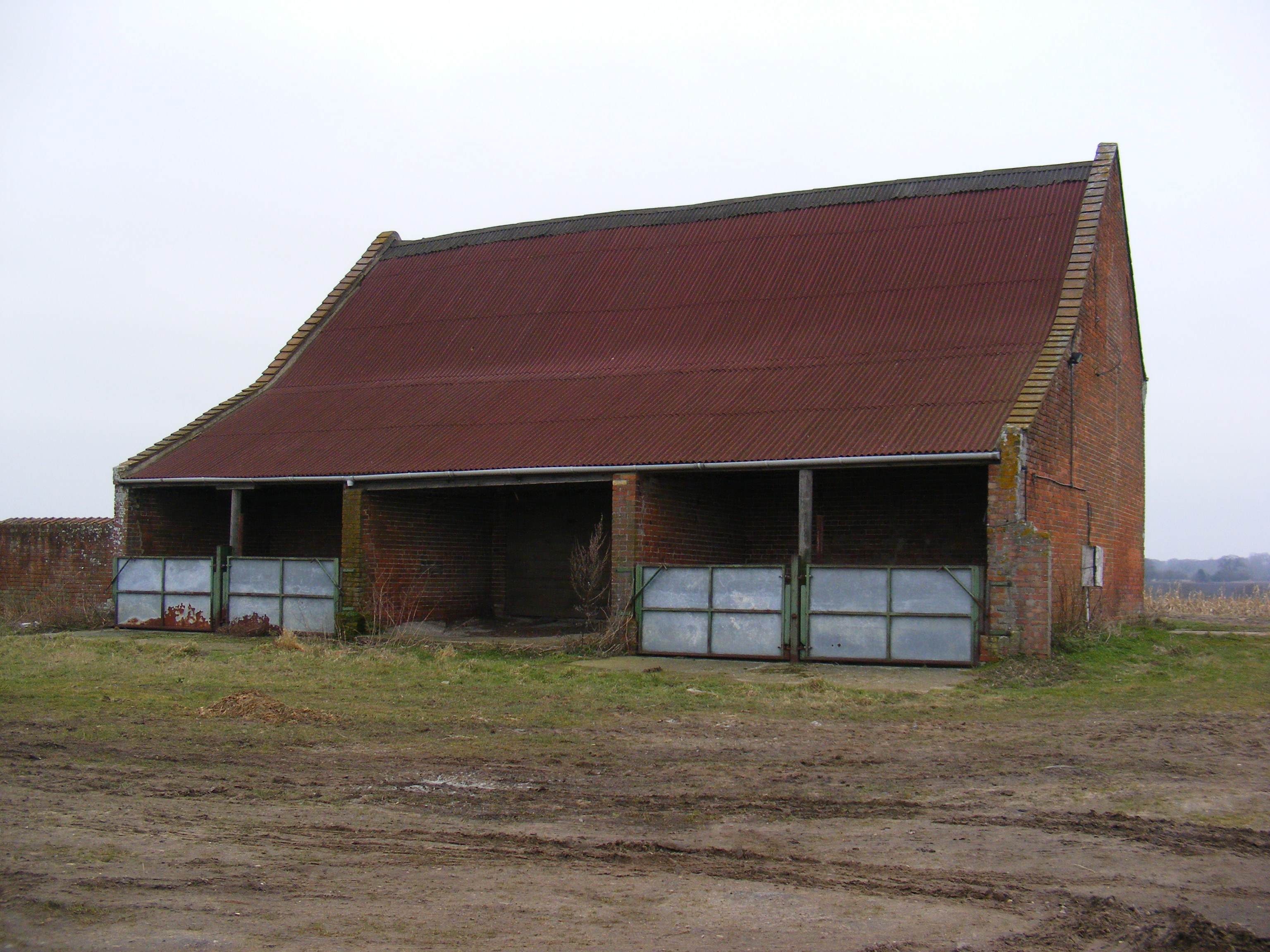
Highfield Barn, Westleton, England

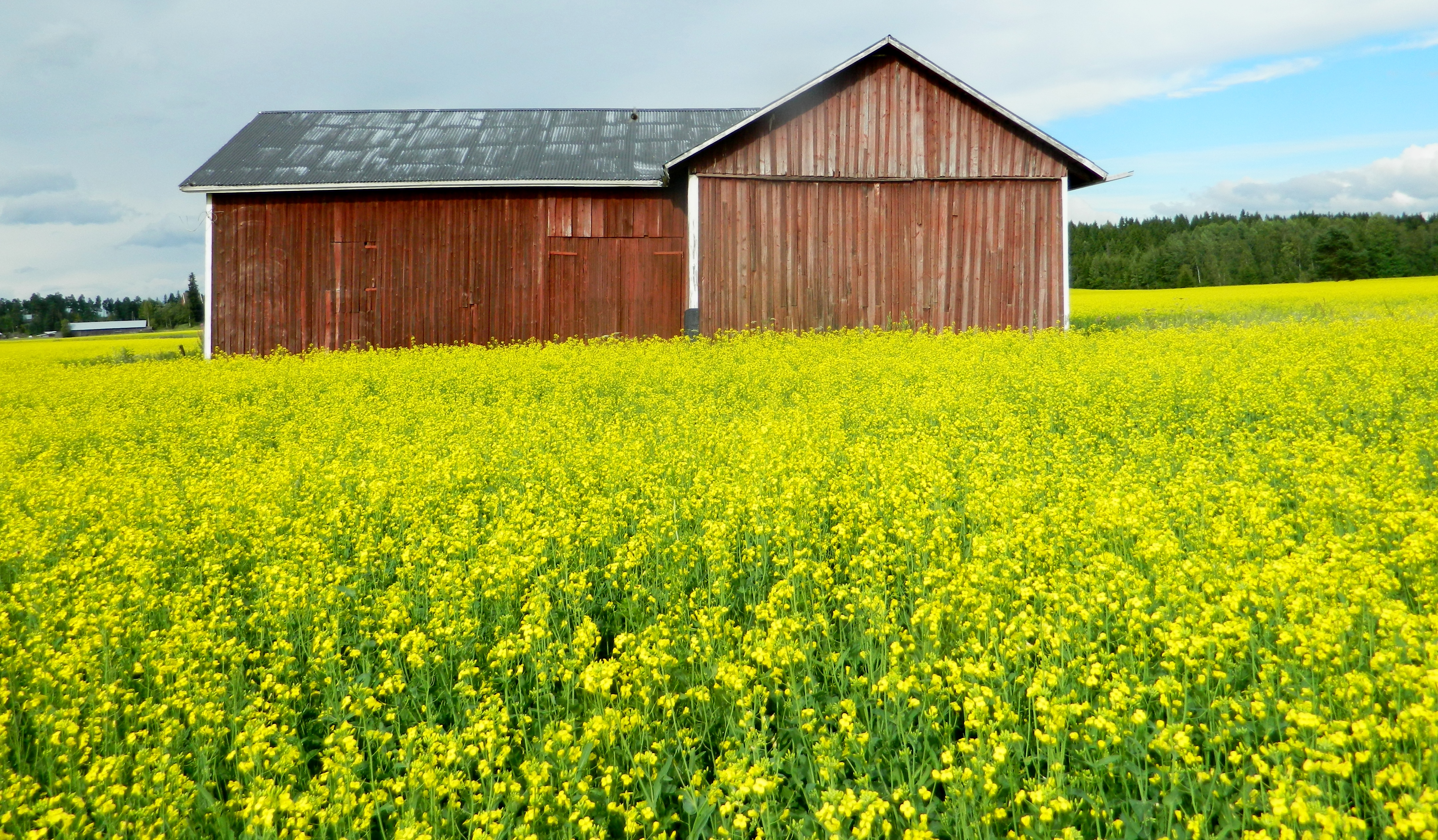
Old field barn in southern Finland

== See also ==
- Field cabin
- Bank barns
- Barn § Types
- Waino Tanttari Field Hay Barn
- Field Barn Heaths, Hilborough
