= John Kennel Sr. Farm =

Historic house in Ohio, United States

- U.S. National Register of Historic Places
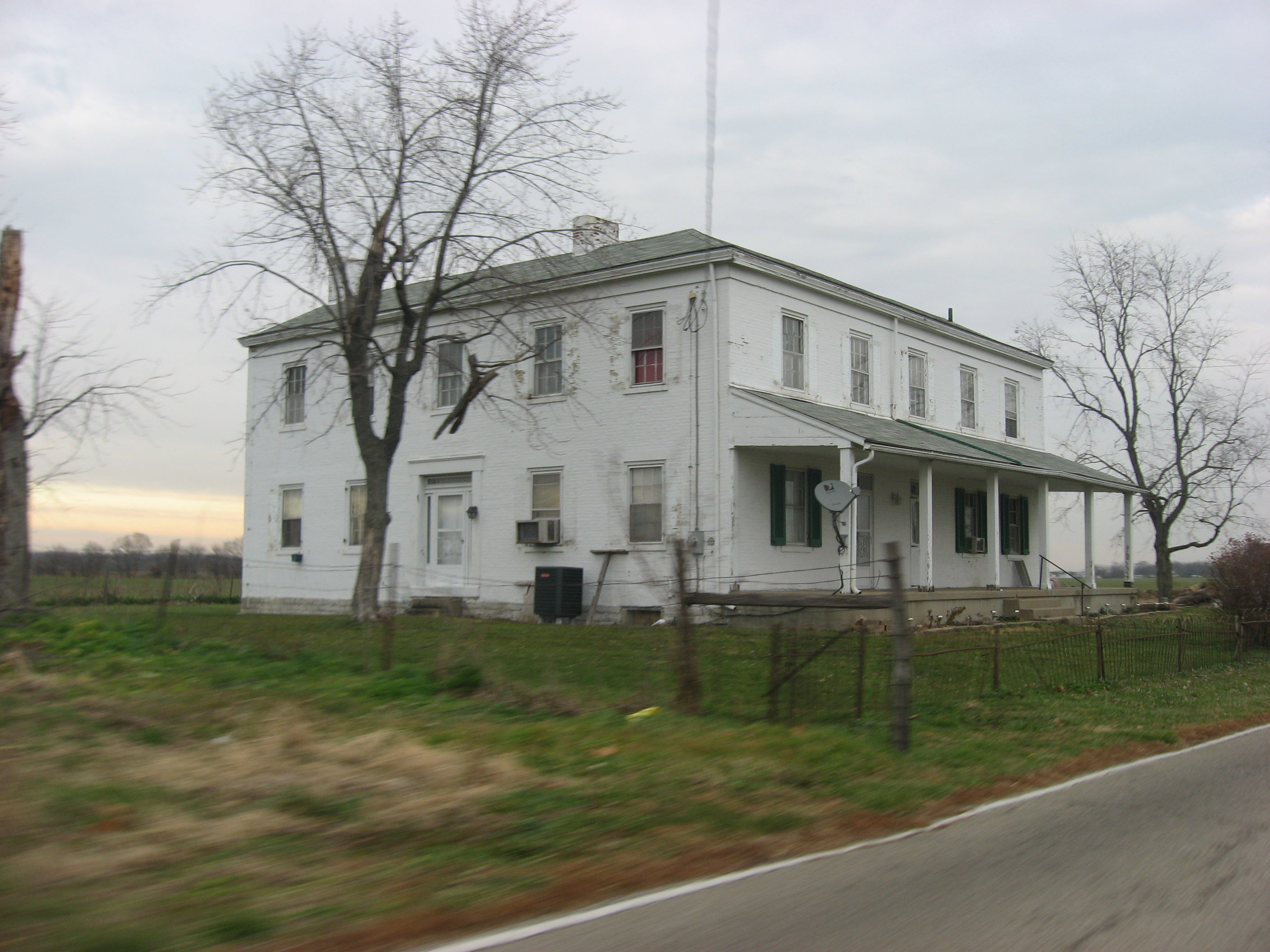
- Front and side of the farmhouse

- Location within Ohio Location within the United States
- Nearest city: Trenton, Ohio
- Coordinates: 39°27′41.04″N 84°28′30.73″W
- MPS: Augspurger Amish/Mennonite Settlement TR
- NRHP reference No.: 84002906
- Added to NRHP: 1984-08-03

John Kennel Sr. Farm was a registered historic building near Trenton, Ohio, listed in the National Register on 1984-08-03. It has since been torn down.

It was a two-story "Amish/Mennonite type" house with a gable-and-hip roof. The front entryway had a transom, and inside was a stairway with cherry handrail and square posts. The property included a bank barn, a brick smokehouse, a corn crib, and an "early" chicken house.

It was home of John Kennel Sr., an Amish person, and his wife Anna Augspurger Kennel, who was of the Hessian Amish people who came to the area in 1832.

== See also ==
- John Kennel Jr. Farm
