= Farmstead =

Buildings and service areas associated with a farm

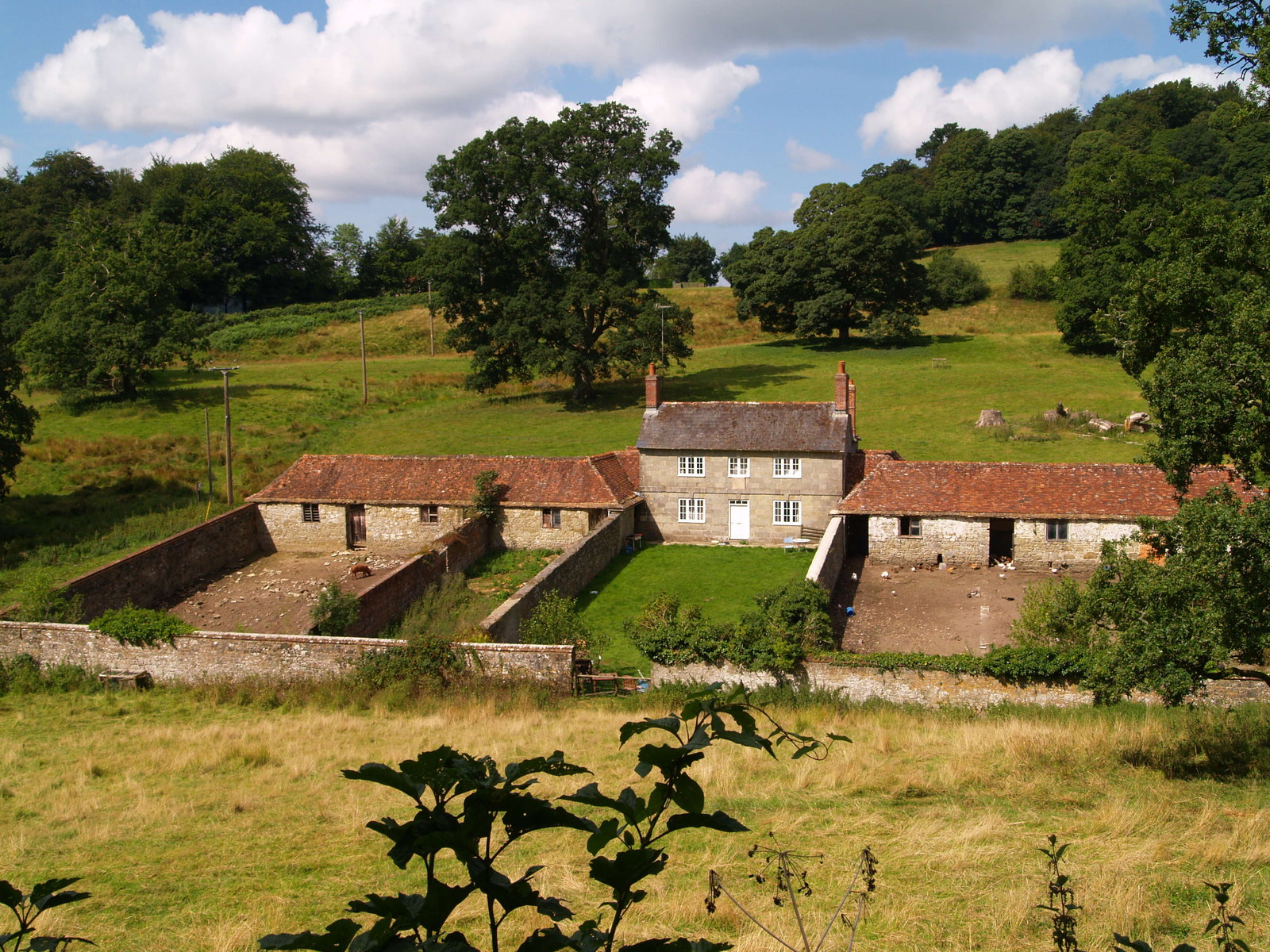
A farmstead at Stourton with Gasper

A farmstead is the buildings and service areas associated with a farm. It consists of the farmhouse along with the surrounding buildings. The characteristics of a specific farmstead reflect the local landscape, which provides their environmental context. Some farmsteads have additional outlying field barns and outfarms somewhat further afield than the main cluster of buildings at the farmstead.

== Functions ==
The functions of farmsteads have changed over time. They include:

- Residential accommodation for workers whether in a farmhouse, the upper floors of other buildings or separate cottages
- Storage of crops produced on the farm
- Processing of such crops for use in subsequent stages in agricultural or industrial uses
- Shelter for draft animals and livestock
- Management of livestock and the storage of their fodder
- Production and storage of manure to fertilise the fields;
- Production of animal products such as dairy products
- Storage of farm vehicles and implements
- Other production suited to the particularities of the farm.
