= Philip Dougherty House =

Historic house in Pennsylvania, United States

- U.S. National Register of Historic Places
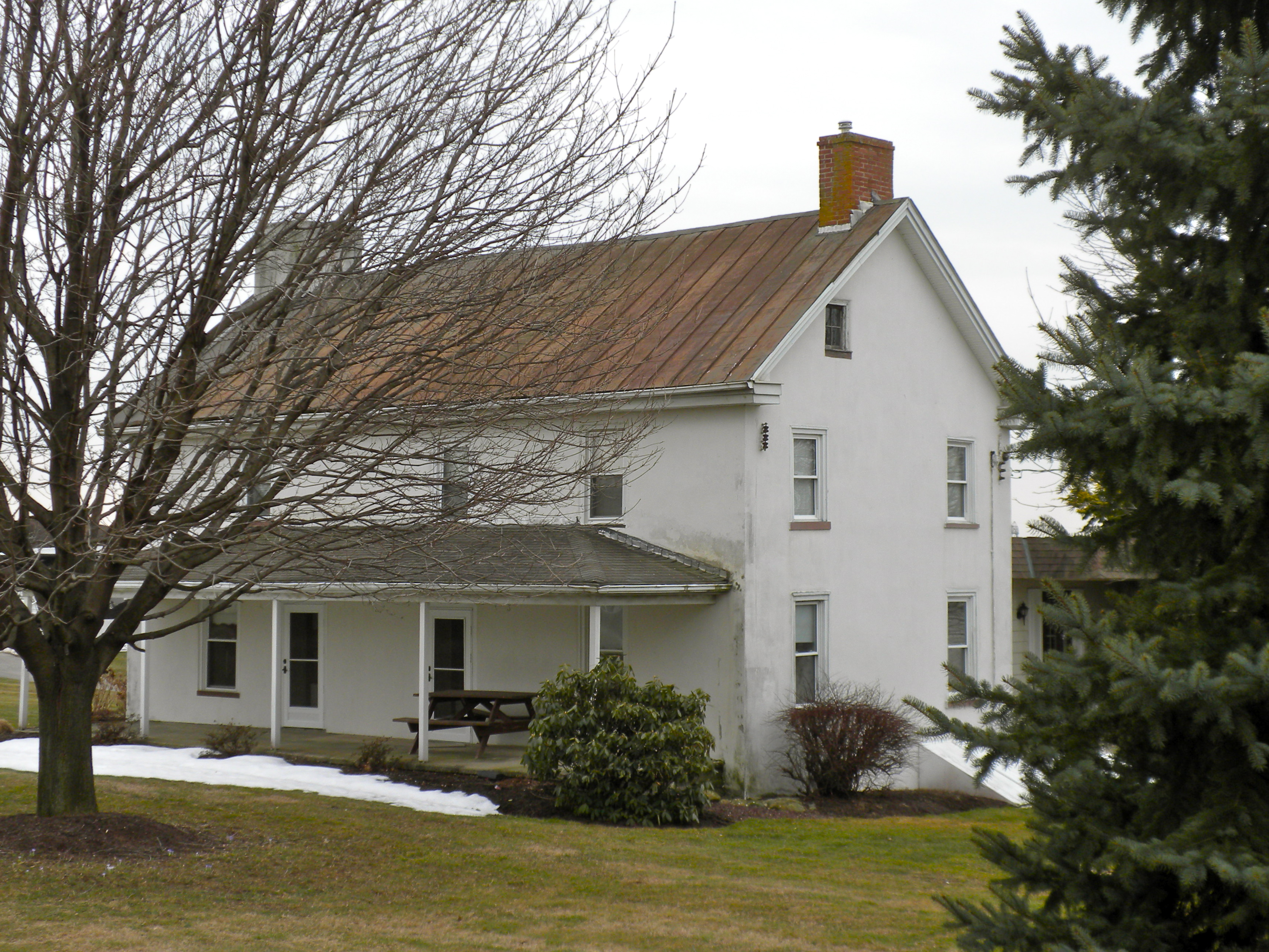
- Philip Dougherty House, March 2010

- Location within Pennsylvania Location within the United States
- Location: Strasburg Road near Coatesville, East Fallowfield Township, Pennsylvania
- Coordinates: 39°57′32″N 75°52′20″W
- Area: 1.5 acres (0.61 ha)
- Built: 1774
- Architectural style: Federal
- MPS: Strasburg Road TR;East Fallowfield Township MRA
- NRHP reference No.: 85002390
- Added to NRHP: September 18, 1985

The Philip Dougherty House is an historic home that is located in East Fallowfield Township, Chester County, Pennsylvania, United States.

Situated directly across the road from the Philip Dougherty Tavern, it was added to the National Register of Historic Places in 1985.

== History and architectural features ==
This historic structure was built circa 1774, and is a two-story, four-bay, stuccoed, stone dwelling with a gable roof. It features a full-width front porch with a hipped roof. Also located on the property are a contributing bank barn, a machine shop, and a milk house. Philip Dougherty was the brother of Edward Dougherty, who built the Edward Dougherty House.
