= Edward Dougherty House =

Historic house in Pennsylvania, United States

- U.S. National Register of Historic Places
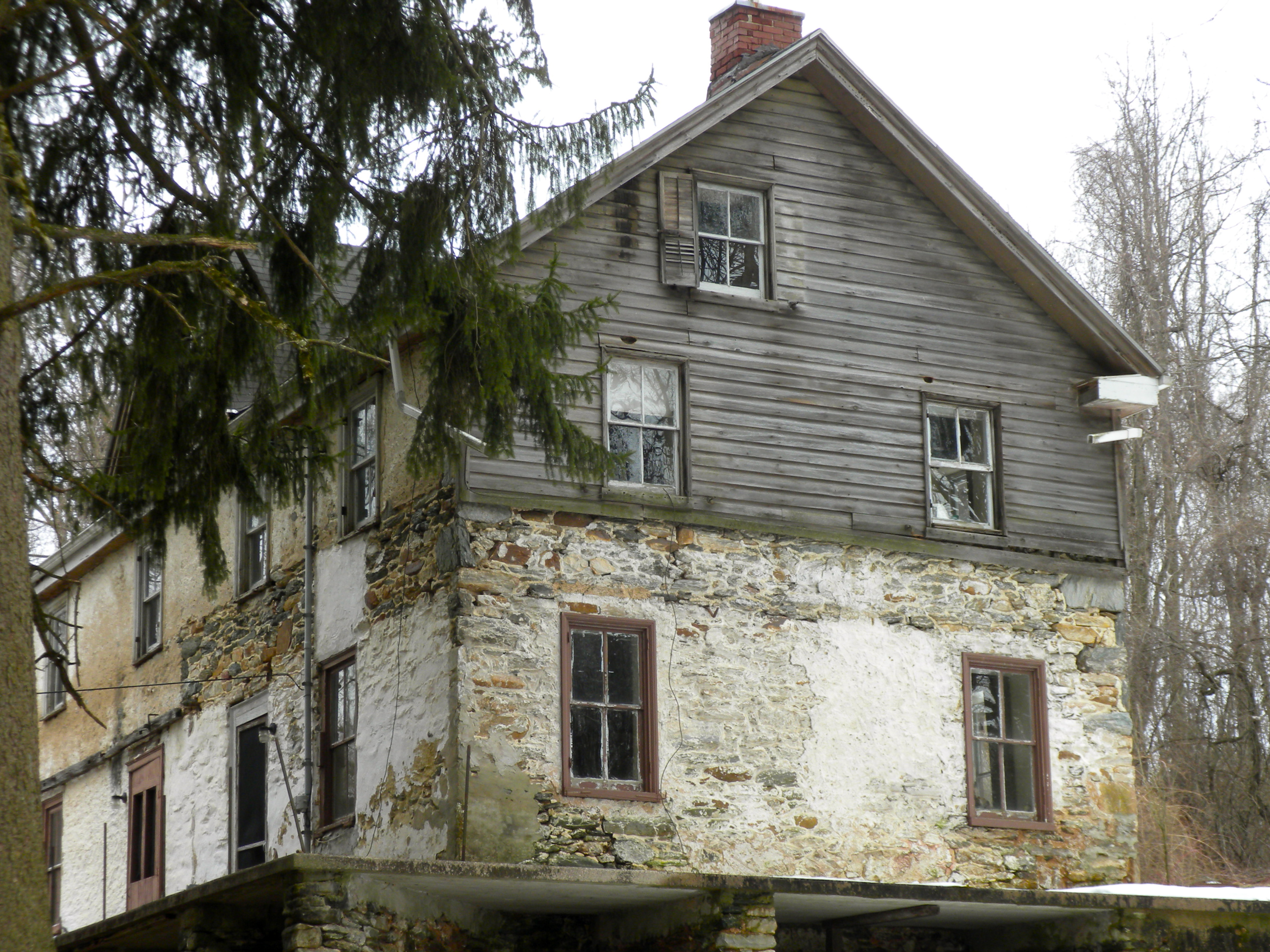
- Edward Dougherty House, March 2010

- Location within Pennsylvania Location within the United States
- Location: Mt. Carmel Road near Coatesville, East Fallowfield Township, Pennsylvania
- Coordinates: 39°57′45″N 75°51′43″W
- Area: 1.8 acres (0.73 ha)
- Built: 1796
- Architectural style: Federal, Vernacular Federal
- MPS: East Fallowfield Township MRAEast Fallowfield Township MRA
- NRHP reference No.: 85001145
- Added to NRHP: May 20, 1985

Edward Dougherty House is a historic home located in East Fallowfield Township, Chester County, Pennsylvania. It was built in 1796, and is a 2 1/2-story, four-bay, fieldstone dwelling with a gable roof in a conservative Federal style. It features a verandah on three sides of the building. Edward Dougherty was the brother of Philip Dougherty, who built the Philip Dougherty House and Philip Dougherty Tavern.

It was added to the National Register of Historic Places in 1985.
