= Connected farm =

Architectural term

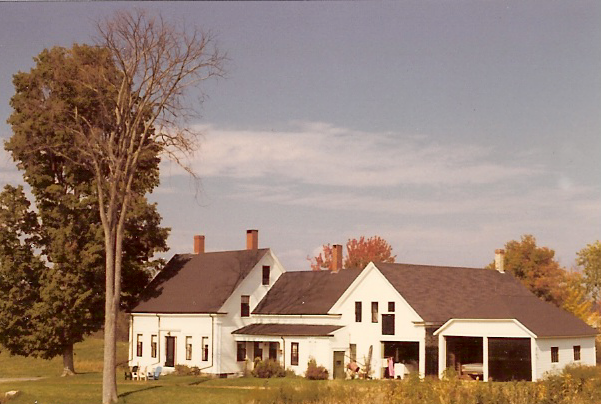
Connected farm in Windham, Maine

A connected farm is an architectural design common in the Maritimes region of Canada, as well as the New England region of the United States, and England and Wales in the United Kingdom. North American connected farms date back to the 17th century, while their British counterparts have also existed for several centuries. New England connected farms are characterized by a farm house, kitchen, barn, or other structures connected in a rambling fashion. This style evolved from carrying out farm work while remaining sheltered from winter weather. In the United Kingdom there are four distinct types of connected farmsteads, all dissimilar to the New England style.

== New England connected farm ==
The typical New England connected farm complex consists of the "big house", which acts as the standard family living quarters. Connected to the "big house" is the "little house", which contains the kitchen area. Next to it is the "back house", which was traditionally a carriage or wagon house. Connected to the back house is a standard livestock barn. This style was banned in many areas due to fire concerns, but the bans were lifted in the 18th century. Originally, all four buildings would have parallel roof lines. In later years (post-1800), when kitchens became more of a room of the house, the Little House became an ell off the Big House.

Connected barns describe the site plan of one or more barns integrated into other structures on a farm in the New England region of the United States. The New England connected farmstead, as many architectural historians have termed the style, consisted of numerous farm buildings all connected into one continuous structure. Houses, ells, sheds, barns, and other outbuildings all were combined to form one long building. Architectural styles varied, from Greek to Gothic Revival. The connected farmstead is unique in not only its connection of house to barn to shed, and so forth, but also because the architectural style of the home was often used on the other structures, including barns, connected to it. The time period when connected farms were popular coincided with the period of the New England barn, so most connected barns are of this type. Occasionally the older style English barn was moved or also connected to a house.

Noted historian and architect Thomas Hubka commented in his 1984 book, Big House, Little House, Back House, Barn:

Those who built connected farms changed their farms by extending the architectural style and order of the house to their barns. This was a truly radical development by New England farmers, and it is this characteristic, more than that of house and barn connection itself, that is one of the unique aspects of New England connected farm architecture."

These types of structures were common throughout New England during the 19th century, but were found most frequently in Maine, New Hampshire, Vermont and Massachusetts.

=== Distribution ===
Wilbur Zelinsky, an American geographer, undertook a survey of existing connected farmsteads in New England in 1958. Through his travels and survey he was able to determine, to some level of accuracy, the distribution of connected barns and farmsteads in New England. Zelinsky found that the connected farm was most frequently found in specific parts of New England, namely in New Hampshire and Massachusetts, where connected barns occurred over almost the entire states. Indeed, the style still persists in popular American architecture. Connected farms were also frequently observed by Zelinsky in southern Maine, eastern Vermont, and portions of northern Connecticut.

The PBS television series This Old House remodeled a homestead in this style located in Carlisle, Massachusetts.

== Delmarva Peninsula ==
During the colonial period and into the 19th century farmers on the Eastern Shore of the Chesapeake Bay built farmhouses that grew as the owner prospered. This style of house, known as the Eastern Shore Style or "big house, little house, colonnade and kitchen" is unique to the Delmarva Peninsula. The first section or "little house" was usually a small 1½-story wood-frame home with a dormered roof. As the farmer prospered and his family grew, a larger two-story addition or "big house" was usually added. The summer kitchen was an outbuilding detached from the main house to remove the heat generated by cooking from the main house during the warmer months. The kitchen often had an attic above for slave lodgings. The structure was located near the house, allowing the delivery of a meal while the food was still hot. On many eastern shore farms a colonnade was later added to connect the kitchen to the farmhouse. Connecting this outbuilding created the historically ubiquitous "Big house, little house, colonnade & kitchen" architectural style seen in many 18th and 19th century homes on the eastern shore such as Selma. Winters are milder in the Delmarva region, and unlike New England connected farmsteads the barn, while usually nearby, was not attached to the house.

== In the United Kingdom ==
Connected structures have existed in England and Wales for centuries. The architectural historian Ronald Brunskill identified four key types of connected farm structures found in England and Wales. The longhouse is generally two connected buildings which result from the addition of more and more partitions, thus subdividing the structure, or from the outright construction of a new building adjacent to the original. Longhouses usually have cross passages, and communication flows freely through the structures. The laithe house confines the family and the farm building under the same roof. However, there are no cross passages and no intercommunication between structures. Typical configurations include farm buildings used for both livestock and grain/hay storage. The bastle house is an arrangement which places the living quarters above the farm building and, usually, the farm animals. This type of connected farm was common as a defensive arrangement; living quarters were located high above for security reasons. In what Brunskill called the "simply connected arrangement" the domestic structure is connected to any type of farm building.
