= Thomas Hubka =

American architectural historian

Thomas C. Hubka (born 1946) is an American architectural historian whose primary focus is vernacular architecture and related issues of architecture and cultural meaning.

== Education ==
Hubka received his Bachelor of Architecture (B.Arch.) from Carnegie-Mellon University in 1969 and his Master of Architecture (M.Arch.) from the University of Oregon in 1972. While at Carnegie Mellon, he was a varsity football player and played quarterback.

== Career ==
He taught at the University of Oregon from 1972 to 1983. From 1987 to 2011, he was a professor in the Department of Architecture at the University of Wisconsin–Milwaukee. After retiring in 2011, he moved to Portland, Oregon. He is currently an adjunct faculty member in the architecture program at Portland State University.

Hubka was an early advocate for widening architectural history research to include vernacular architecture. He is best known for his work on connected farm buildings in New England. His book Big House, Little House, Back House, Barn was the 1985 winner of the "Abbott Lowell Cummings Award" of the Vernacular Architecture Forum.

Hubka's research on eastern European synagogues, begun in the mid-1980s, addressed 18th-century wooden synagogues of eastern Europe emphasizing the relationships between Jewish culture and eastern European contextual factors. With significant funding support from the National Endowment for the Arts and the National Endowment for the Humanities, this research led to his 2003 book, Resplendent Synagogue: Architecture and Worship in an Eighteenth-century Polish Community, which won the "Henry Glassie Award" of the Vernacular Architecture Forum in 2006. The book also received an honorable mention from the American Association for the Advancement of Slavic Studies (AAASS)/Orbis Books prize committee in 2004.

In recent years Hubka has researched workers' housing in Milwaukee and other cities. This research led to his book Houses Without Names: Architectural Nomenclature and the Classification of America's Common Houses published in 2013.

Hubka served on the Wisconsin Historic Preservation Review Board for twelve years; during this time he chaired its Architecture Committee.

The ACSA (Association of Collegiate Schools of Architecture) honored Hubka with the ACSA Distinguished Professor Award in 2009–10.

In 2021, his book How the Working-Class Home Became Modern, 1900-1940 was the recipient of the University of Mary Washington Center for Historic Preservation Book Prize.

== Selected writings ==
- Hubka, Thomas C., Big House, Little House, Back House, Barn: The Connected Farm Buildings of New England, University Press of New England, Hanover NH 1984, ISBN 0-87451-310-3
- Hubka, Thomas C., Resplendent Synagogue: Architecture and Worship in an Eighteenth-century Polish Community, Brandeis University Press, published by University Press of New England, Hanover NH 2003, ISBN 1-58465-216-0
- Hubka, Thomas C., Houses Without Names: Architectural Nomenclature and the Classification of America's Common Houses, University of Tennessee Press, Knoxville TN 2013, ISBN 978-1-57233-947-7
- Hubka, Thomas C., and Ochsner, Jeffrey Karl, "H.H. Richardson: The Design of the William Watts Sherman House," Journal of the Society of Architectural Historians 51/2 (June 1992), pages 121-145.
- Hubka, Thomas C., and Ochsner, Jeffrey Karl, “The East Elevation of the Sherman House, Newport, Rhode Island.” Journal of the Society of Architectural Historians, 52/1 (March 1993), pages 88–90.
- Hubka, Thomas C., "H.H. Richardson's Glessner House: A Garden in the Machine," Winterthur Portfolio 24/4 (Winter 1989), pages 209-229.
