= John Kennel Jr. Farm =

Historic house in Ohio, United States

- U.S. National Register of Historic Places
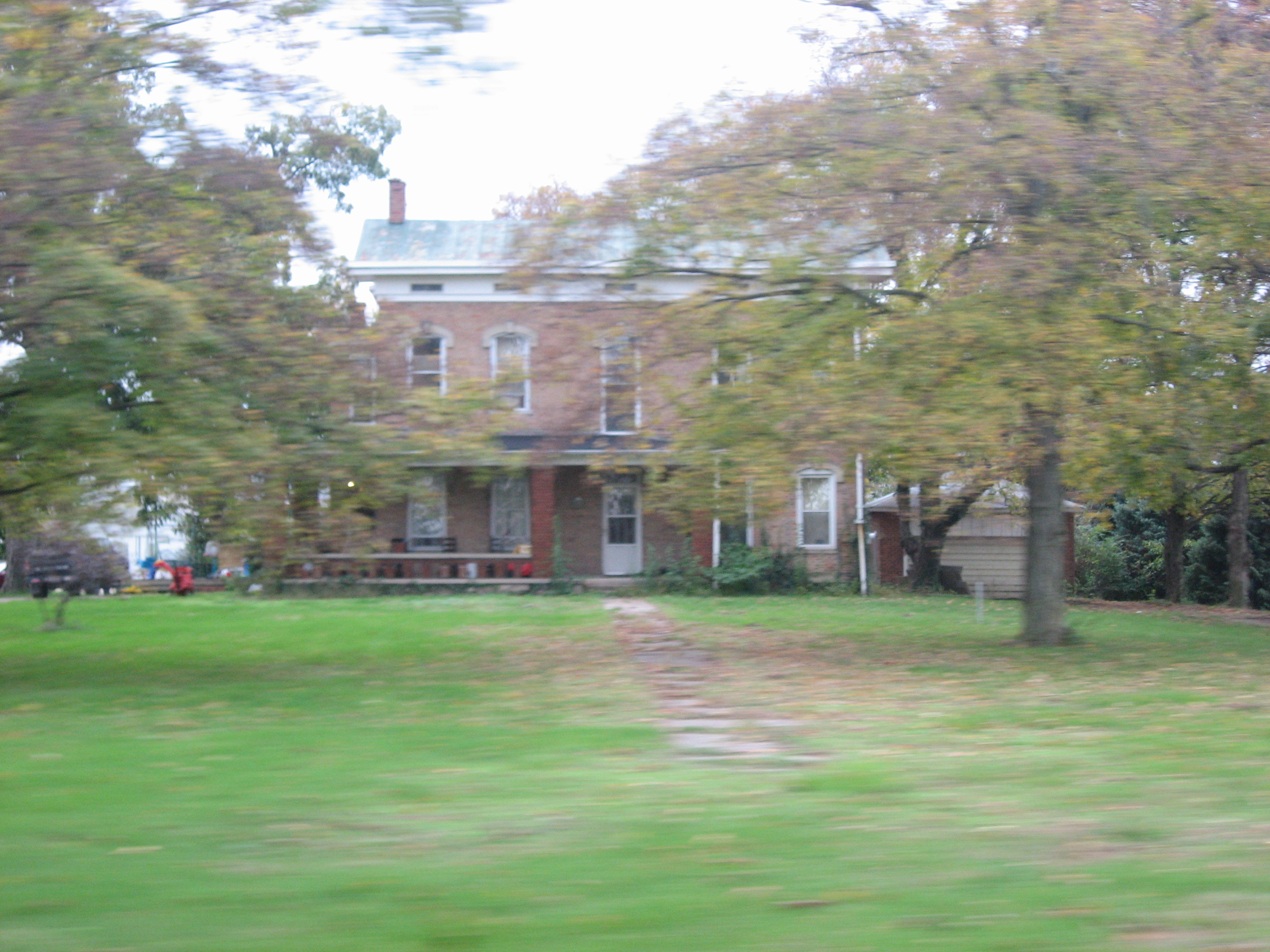
- Roadside view of the farmhouse

- Location within Ohio Location within the United States
- Nearest city: Trenton, Ohio
- Coordinates: 39°26′43.55″N 84°28′34.70″W
- MPS: Augspurger Amish/Mennonite Settlement TR
- NRHP reference No.: 84002907
- Added to NRHP: 1984-08-03

John Kennel Jr. Farm is a registered historic building near Trenton, Ohio, listed in the National Register on August 3, 1984.

== Historic uses ==
- Single Dwelling

Original portion of farmhouse was built in 1876. An additional kitchen with second level bedroom added in the 1930s. All of red brick construction with stone foundation. Basement floor is brick, a portion of the basement was used to slaughter and cure meat. What is now the garage was originally a summer kitchen.

At one time grapes and pears were grown in the back yard. A pecan tree, reputed to be the only one in the state of Ohio that bears nuts once existed.

The property is quite close to Native American burial grounds and approximately 2.5 miles to the north is a signal mound, believed to be built by the Adena. Many artifacts (arrowheads and hammering devices) have been found on the John Kennel Jr. property over the decades.

== See also ==
- John Kennel Sr. Farm
