= New England barn =

Two New England style bank barns at Sabbathday Lake Shaker Village, Maine, U.S.A.

The New England Barn or Yankee Barn was the most common style of barn built in most of the 19th century in rural New England and variants are found throughout the United States. This style barn superseded the ”three-bay barn” in several important ways. The most obvious difference is the location of the barn doors on the gable-end(s) rather than the sidewall(s). The New England and three bay barns were used similarly as multipurpose farm buildings (housing animals, crop storage and other uses all in one building) but the New England barns are typically larger and have a basement. Culturally the New England Barn represents a shift from subsistence farming to commercial farming thus are larger and show significant changes in American building methods and technologies. Most were used as dairy barns but some housed teams of oxen which are generally called teamster barns. Sometimes these barns are simply called “gable fronted” and “gable fronted bank barns” but these terms are also used for barns other than the New England style barn such as in Maryland and Virginia which is not exactly the same style as found in New England. A similar style found in parts of the American mid-west and south is called a transverse frame barn or transverse crib barn.

== History ==
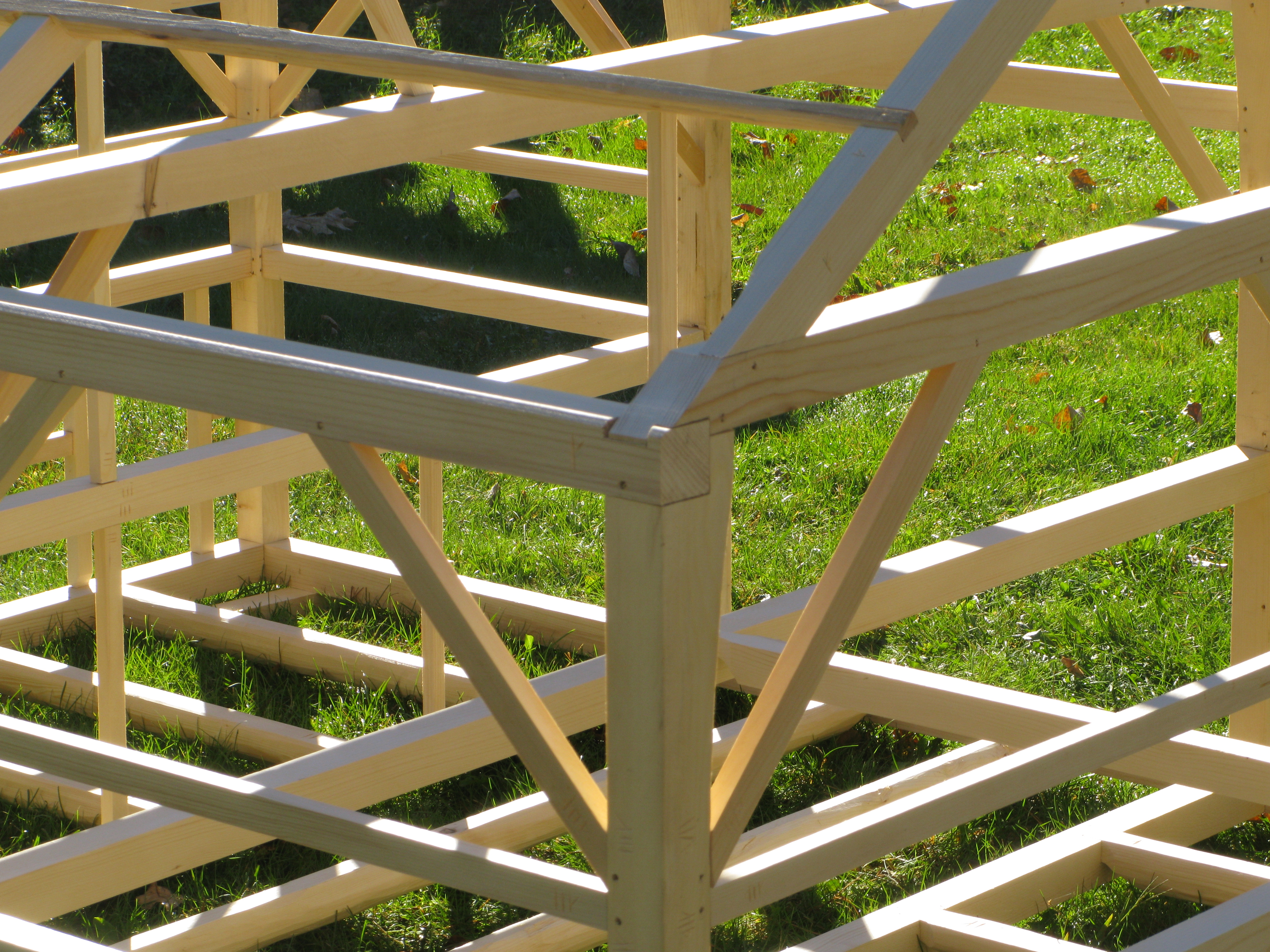
Detail of the English tying joint in a model of a three-bay barn. The New England barn joinery at this location is simpler to build and is called dropped tie framing in American English and translated as raised plate or high plate framing from the Dutch language

Development of the New England barn began early in the 19th century, but they usually date from after 1830. They were the most popular barn type in New England by 1860. The construction is very different from the English barn typically being built using the square rule method of joinery, raised in bents, increasingly of sawn rather than hewn timbers, common rafter roof framing with purlin plates, designed to be used with a hay track, straight posts rather than flared (gunstock) posts, and dropped tie beam framing rather than the English tying joint. The doors are mounted on the gable end rather than the sidewall and after the 1840s mounted on rollers so they slide sideways rather than being mounted on hinges and swinging outward. Sometimes they have interior sliding doors. Doors on rollers are believed to have been a development from rail cars which had sliding doors. A full basement became standard and was used primarily for manure management with trap doors in the floor of the tie-up so manure was easily shoveled into the basement for later use on the fields. This is a significant difference between the Pennsylvania Barn where the cows were housed on the basement level. The basements also had sliding doors, sometimes arranged as a drive through passage. The foundation is dry laid stone, some of which may have been split rather than just being field-stone; and some barns have a top course of large, rectangular, quarried stones. The drive floor was not needed for hand threshing since threshing machines were available by this time. Scarf joints were needed to join timbers longitudinally because these barns are larger in size and the timber supply was more limited so full length timbers were not available. Roof overhangs of a foot are typically built in on the gables and eaves protecting the walls from water. Later in the 19th century these barns may also have ventilators or a cupola on the roof to help reduce moisture build-up inside. Stairways are sometimes found in New England barns but built-in ladders are common but less prevalent than ladders found in the New World Dutch barn. The number and size of cows were larger and were given more headroom so the New England barns were not just longer and wider but taller. Also the New England barn was popular during the period in northern New England when the connected farm building arrangement was popular and so were more likely to be connected to the house through a series of smaller rooms. Some New England barns have an indoor silo. These barns are easier to add on to by adding more bays. The New England barn almost always has a gable roof, but a gambrel roof form may be found on some New England barns. Sometimes the New England barn is framed with studs in the walls and horizontal sheathing boards instead of the more common rails with vertical sheathing.

== Comparison with the three-bay barn ==
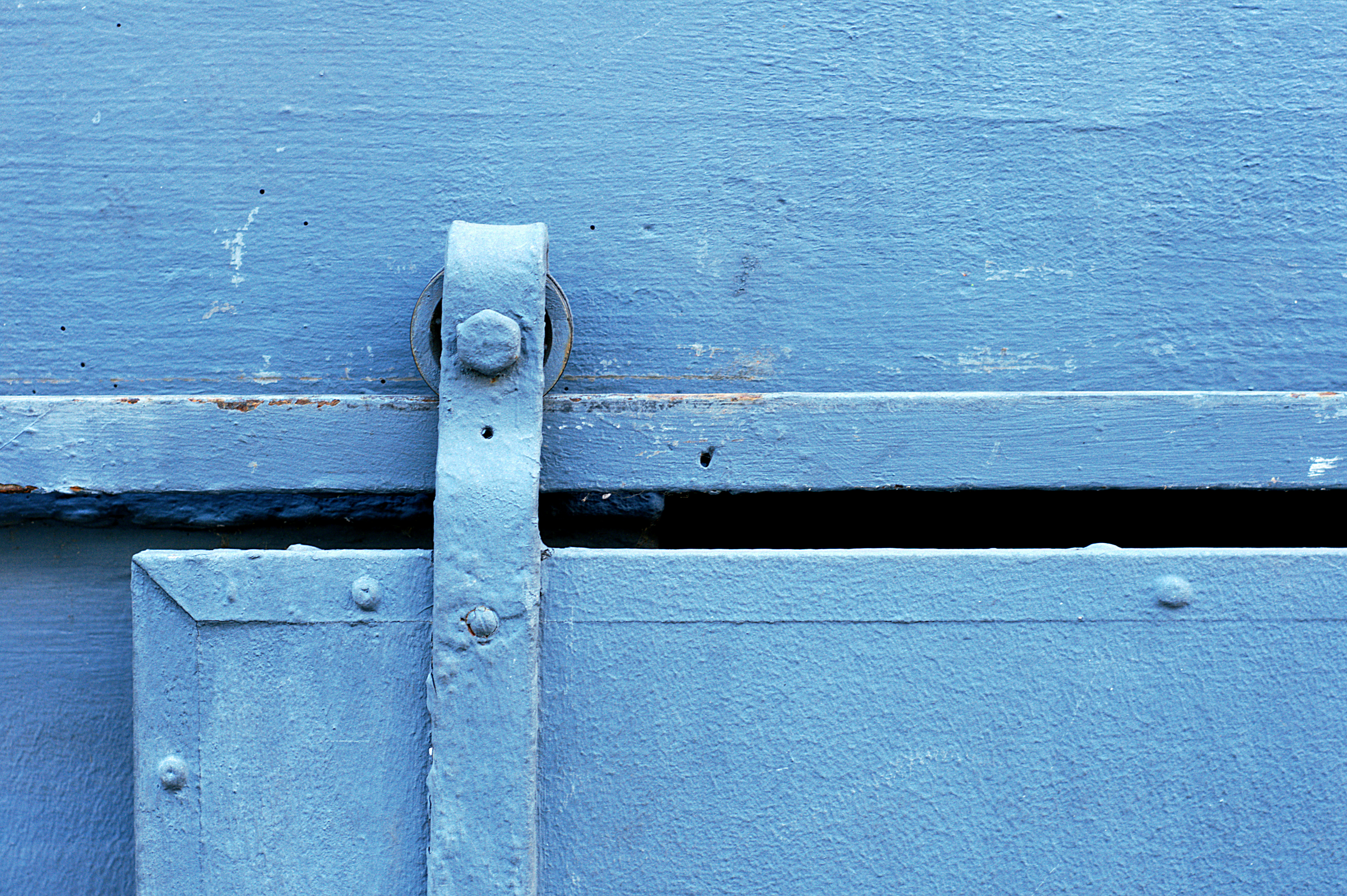
A simple example of sliding door roller and track similar to what was commonly used in New England barns

The English barn (also known as a three-bay barn, Connecticut barn, Yankee barn, thirty-by-forty and sometimes confusingly called a New England barn) was built from a very early date in the northeast United States. The defining characteristics are the big, swinging doors on the sidewall with strap hinges mounted on pintles and three or sometimes four bays. The doors being on the side walls creates the spatial arrangement of the bays being the main divisions of these barns. The English barns were built during the period of using scribe rule framing (the irregular timbers were laid out and scribed to fit together). The framing was raised in sidewall assemblies, made with hewn timbers, in northern New England frequently had common purlin roofs, and often framed with the English tying joint on flared (gunstock) posts although these are not defining characteristics. The middle bay was used for unloading hay wagons, threshing (thrashing) grain and other work. The foundation was typically not quarried stone but fieldstone and had no basement thus are called a ground barn. The timbers used were typically one solid piece running the full length of the building sometimes over forty feet long. The cows often stood on the ground rather than on a wood floor, their heads facing the middle bay in what is called a tie-up (not individual box stalls). Also the breeds of cows were usually smaller than today. English barns were built before the New England practice of connecting the barn to the house was popular so these barns are usually separate from the house although they could have been connected to the house at a later date. Houses and barns in New England built before the early 19th century typically face south rather than facing a road, the later orientation. Similarities between the English and New England barn are that buildings were used for multiple purposes: the cows were in tie-ups on one side of the main floor, typically a narrower space on the warmer side of the building, and hay storage and a stable were in the other side, typically the colder side. Both types of barns were sometimes built with big doors on both ends of the drive floor so a wagon team could drive through and generally called a drive through barn. Occasionally the back door was small and only used for ventilation or winnowing. There were likely loose poles called a scaffold on the beams above the drive floor and loft floors above the tie-ups. There may be a transom window above the barn doors and windows were used as needed in some of the walls, but more windows are likely to be found in the New England barn. The roofs of the three-bay barns frequently have no overhang on the eaves or sidewalls, but some New England barns have original, built in roof overhangs. There is a rare class of barn which are framed like an English barn but originally designed with the doors on the gable end. In general terms these are called a transitional barn and show the transition between the two distinct styles. (Some English barns were later converted to gable entry and there is usually evidence where the old side-doors were located.)

== Comparison with other types of barns ==
Some 19th-century barns found in other parts of the U.S. may have some similarities with the New England barn but are distinctly different. The Pennsylvania barn has doors on the sidewall like the English barn but is a larger, bank barn with the cows housed in the basement, and has one or more distinctive forebays (cantilevered walls). The New World Dutch barn (Dutch barn) has similarities to the New England barn with the barn doors on the gable ends, but the Dutch barns are a much older type and are framed with the classic anchor beam framing. Dutch barns are ground barns.

Other special-purpose buildings were common on rural farms, such as a milk room, corn crib, workshop, wagon shed, and ice-house.

== Exterior ==
Roofs were typically covered with wood shingles until sheet metal roofing became available. Thatch roofing had fallen out of use by this time period. The wall sheathing was usually vertically boarded but may be studded with the wall boards installed horizontally. Barns may be left unpainted or painted, most commonly an inexpensive red color. Ventilation was desired in barns so the walls were sometimes left without siding or covered with wood shingles or clapboards and then asphalt shingles. The New England barn may have been ornamented in an architectural style to match the farmhouse. Ventilators and cupolas were added to some barns in the 19th century to improve ventilation. Lightning protection systems were often strung along the roof ridge in intercept lightning strikes and prevent fire. New England barns are usually a type of bank barn, built into the side of a hill giving ground level access to one side, but a ramp or rarely a bridge were used to access the doors. The roof form is typically a gable roof but some New England barns were built with a gambrel roof.
