= Waino Tanttari Field Hay Barn =

- U.S. National Register of Historic Places
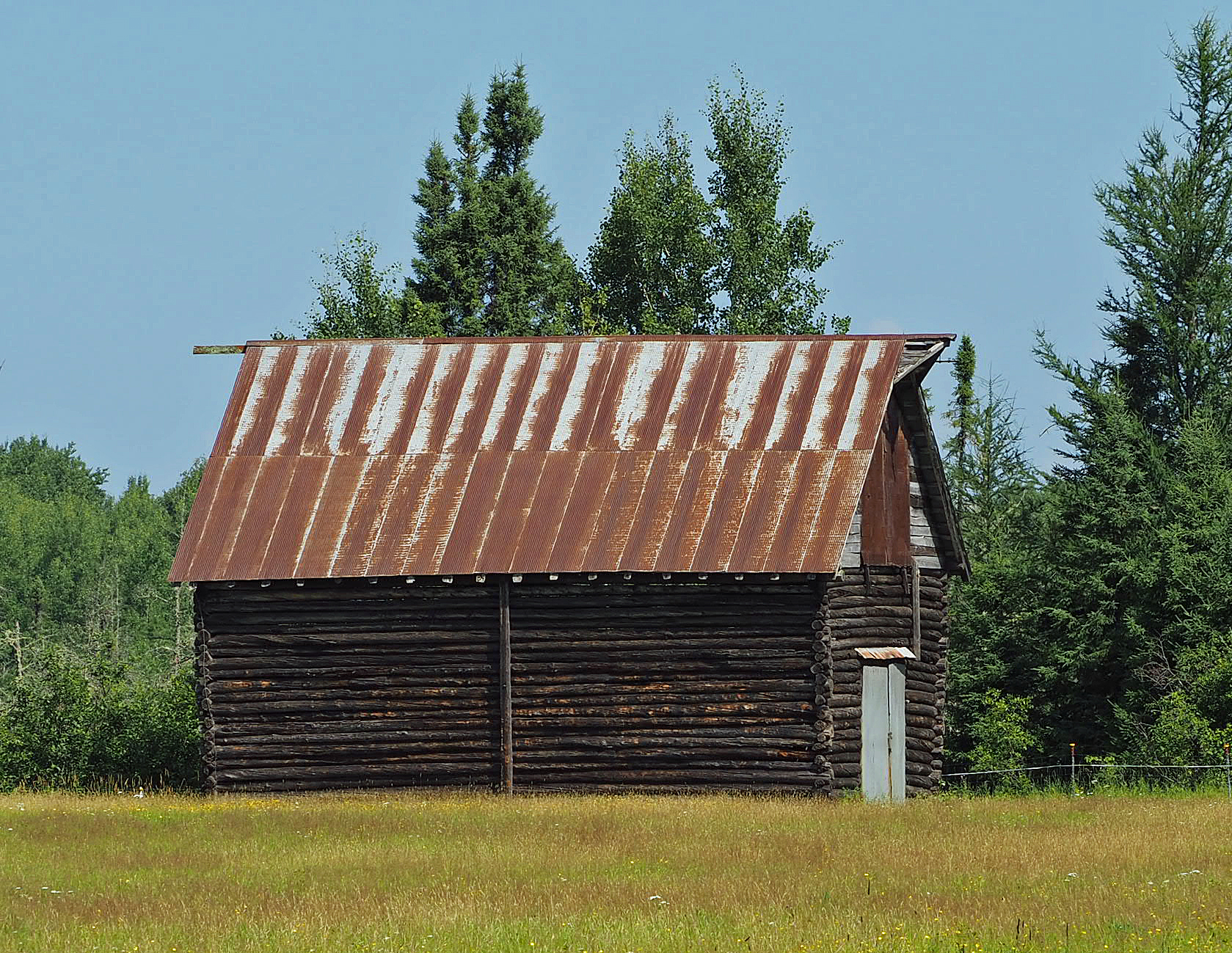
- The Waino Tanttari Field Hay Barn from the south

- Location within Minnesota Location within the United States
- Location: 8261 Wilen Road, Waasa Township, Minnesota
- Coordinates: 47°42′37.8″N 92°9′43″W
- Area: Less than one acre
- Built: 1935
- Architect: Waino Tanttari
- Architectural style: Log
- MPS: Rural Finnish Log Buildings of St. Louis County, Minnesota, 1890–1930s MPS
- NRHP reference No.: 90000773
- Added to NRHP: April 9, 1990

The Waino Tanttari Field Hay Barn is a barn built with traditional Finnish log construction in Waasa Township, Minnesota, United States. It was built in 1935 by Finnish American farmer Waino Tanttari, and stands in isolation a quarter mile from the main cluster of buildings on the farmstead. The Tanttari Barn was listed on the National Register of Historic Places in 1990 for its state-level significance in the theme of agriculture. It was nominated for reflecting the successful conversion of northeastern Minnesota's cutover forests into farmland by late-19th and early-20th-century Finnish American settlers.

It has a hay hood.

== See also ==
- National Register of Historic Places listings in St. Louis County, Minnesota
