= Selma (Eastville, Virginia) =

Historic house in Virginia, United States

- U.S. National Register of Historic Places
- Virginia Landmarks Register
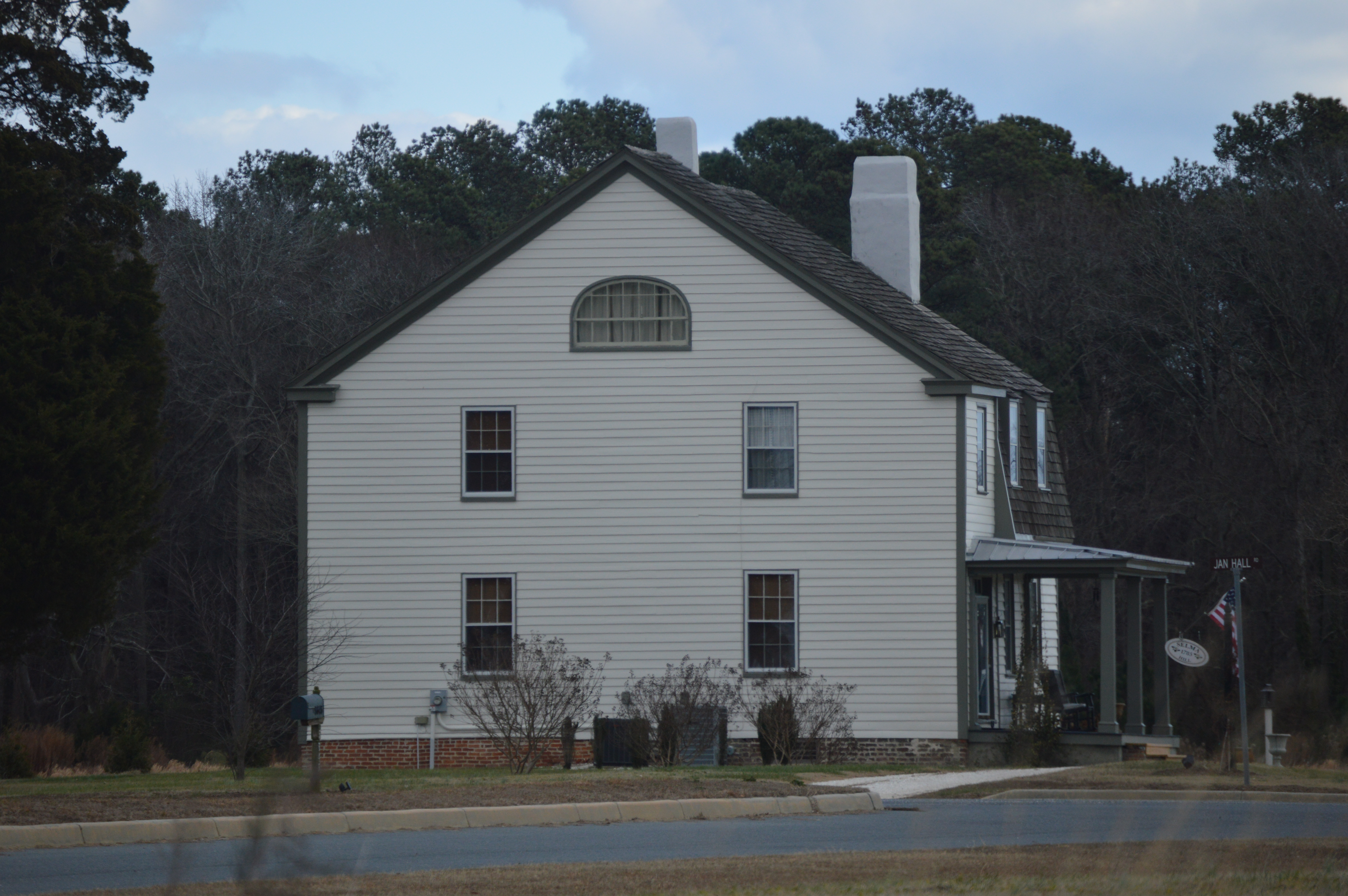
- Western side and front

- Location within Virginia Location within the United States
- Location: 16237 Courthouse Rd., Eastville, Virginia
- Coordinates: 37°21′32″N 75°56′32″W
- Area: 4.5 acres (1.8 ha)
- Built: 1785
- Built by: Isaac Smith, et al.
- Architectural style: Colonial, Greek Revival
- NRHP reference No.: 06000368
- VLR No.: 065-0077

Significant dates
- Added to NRHP: May 10, 2006
- Designated VLR: March 8, 2006

Selma is a historic plantation house located at Eastville, Northampton County, Virginia. The original section of the manor house was built about 1785, and was a two-story, three-bay with a side-passage and single pile plan topped with a gambrel roof. The house was later modified and expanded and is in the form of a "big house, little house, colonnade, kitchen." Also on the property are the contributing attached kitchen, two cemeteries, a shed, the brick foundation floor of a former kitchen, and a boxwood garden.

It was listed on the National Register of Historic Places in 2006.
