= Field Barn Heaths, Hilborough =

Protected area in Norfolk, England

Coordinates: 52.581°N 0.682°E

- Site of Special Scientific Interest
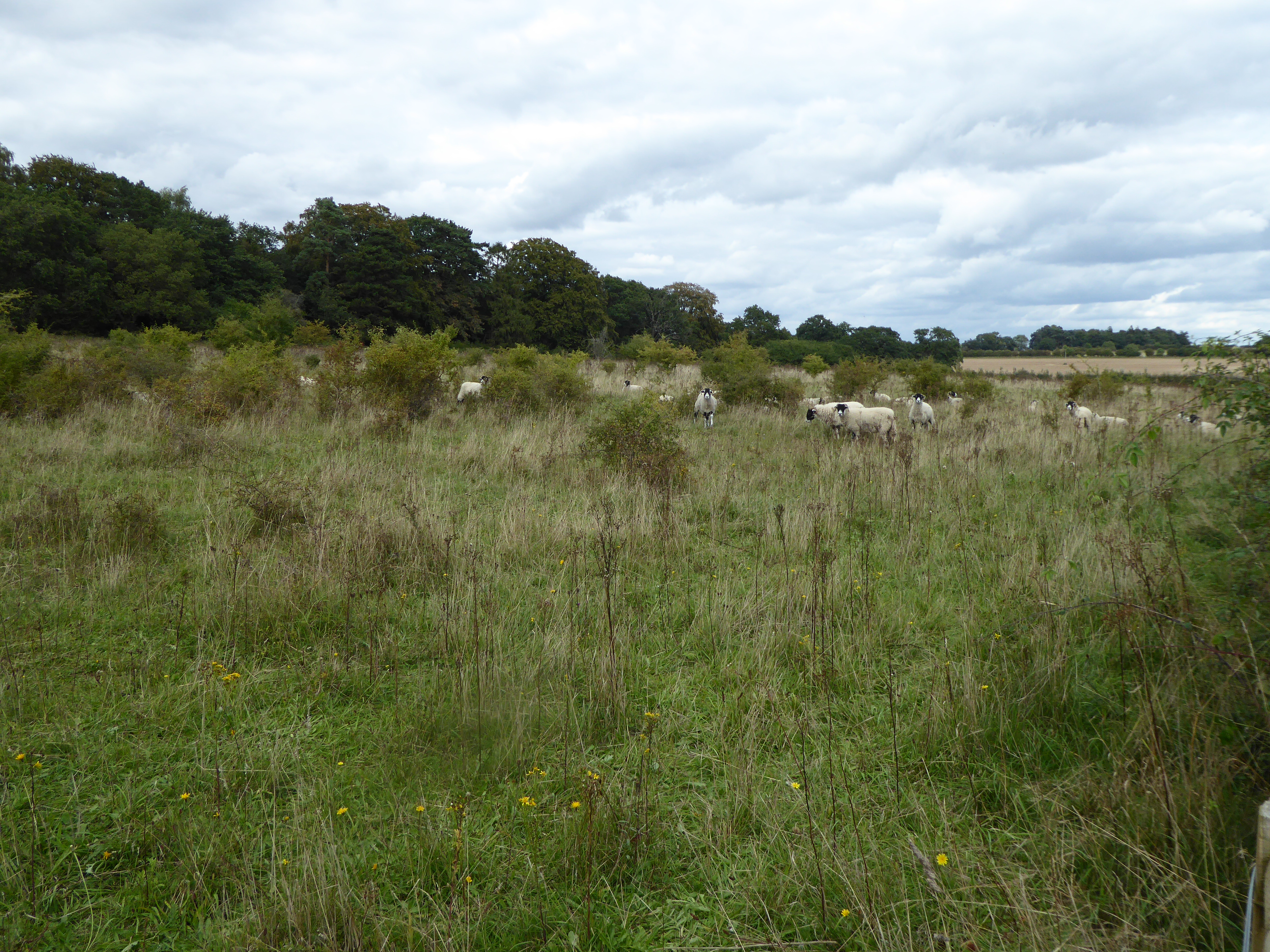
- Location of Field Barn Heaths, Hilborough.
- Area of search: Norfolk
- Grid reference: TF 818 015
- Interest: Biological
- Area: 17.9 hectares (44 acres)
- Notification date: 1987
- Location map: Magic Map

Field Barn Heaths, Hilborough is a 17.9-hectare (44-acre) biological Site of Special Scientific Interest north-west of Hilborough in Norfolk, England. It is part of the Breckland Special Area of Conservation and Special Protection Area.

This light sandy grassland site is maintained by rabbit grazing and it has a rich variety of flora. There are also areas of ungrazed grassland and oak and hawthorn woodland.

The site is private land with no public access.
