= Crib barn =

American architectural style

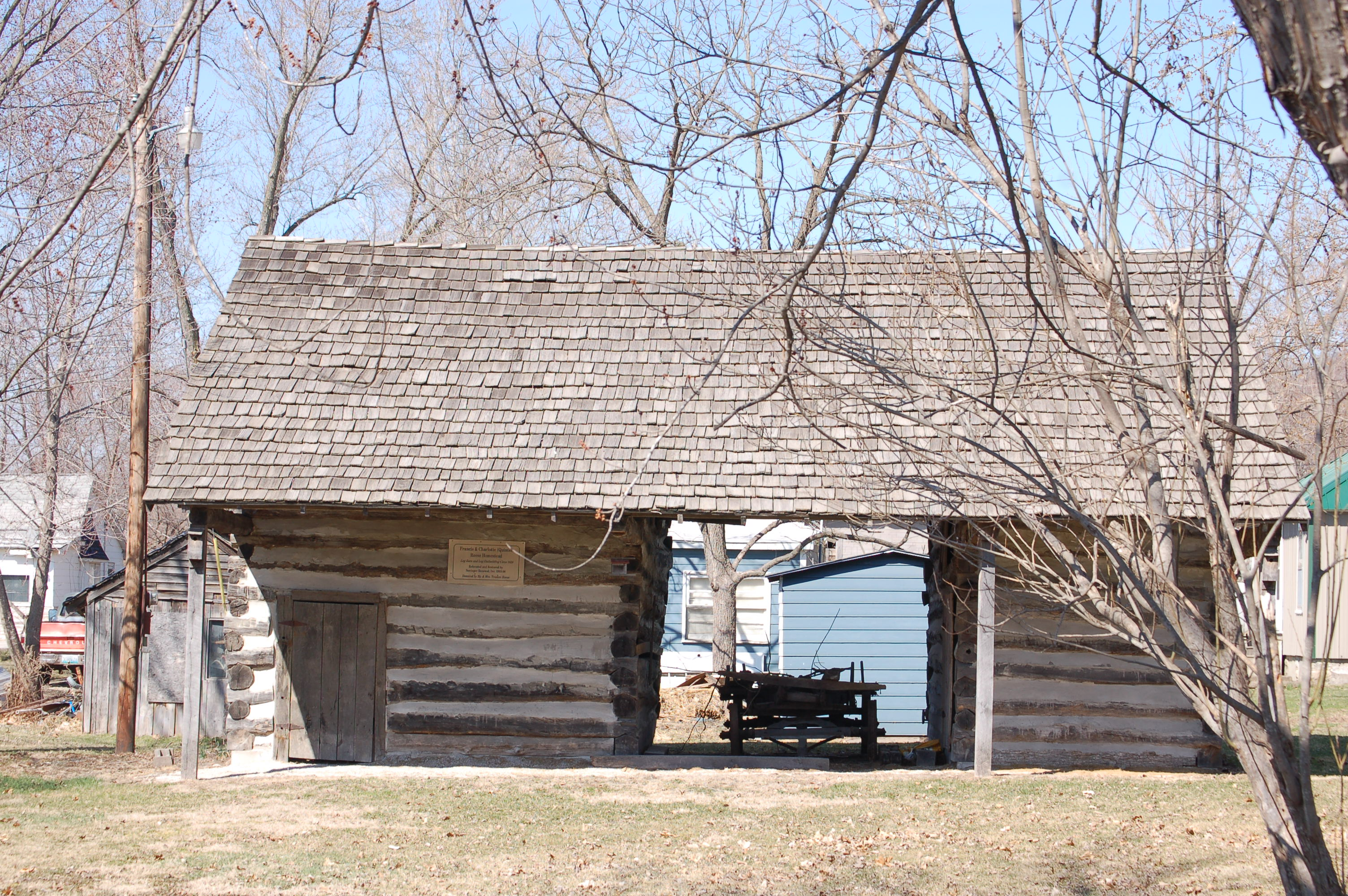
Reese Family Log Barn, Novinger, Missouri U.S.A. National Register of Historic Places 79001344

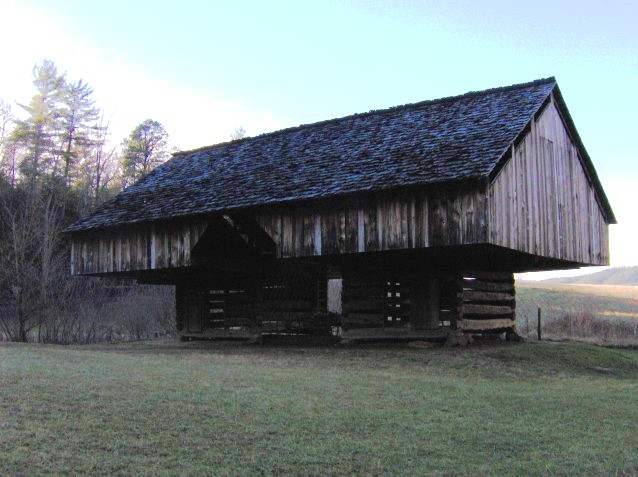
Double-cantilever, two-crib barn at the Tipton Place in Cades Cove, Great Smokey Mountain National Park, in East Tennessee. The cantilever barn design, which is Western European in origin, is common throughout Southern Appalachia but rare elsewhere in North America. National Register of Historic Places 77000111

Crib barns were a popular type of barn found throughout the U.S. south and southeast regions. Crib barns were especially ubiquitous in the Appalachian and Ozark Mountain states of North Carolina, Virginia, Kentucky, Tennessee, Missouri, East Oklahoma and Arkansas.

== Design ==
These barns were composed of multiple cribs, up to six, which were used for feed storage or livestock pens. Crib barn construction was somewhat simplistic compared to other types of barns, such as the prairie barn or the round barn, which gained popularity in American agriculture. Crib barns were most often built of unchinked logs and may or may not have included a hay loft depending on the specific barn. Unaltered examples of crib barns usually have roofs covered with undressed wood shingles, which, over time, were replaced with tin or asphalt. It is the rustic appearance of crib barns that cause them to stand out.

The most popular type of crib barn built in the Appalachian states was also the simplest to construct considering its size and stability. The "Double Crib" consisted of two cribs separated by a breezeway and covered by the same roof. This type of barn is the most common in Appalachia. The doors in this type of crib barn face either front or in, toward the breezeway. The loft, as is typical with crib barns that have lofts, is used for storage of feed and hay in this design of crib barn while the first floor is used for stabling. The breezeway, which essentially acted as a driveway which entered the barn was often used for threshing grain.

== See also ==
- Timber framing
- Dogtrot house
- Log building
