= Outfarm =

Set of agricultural buildings

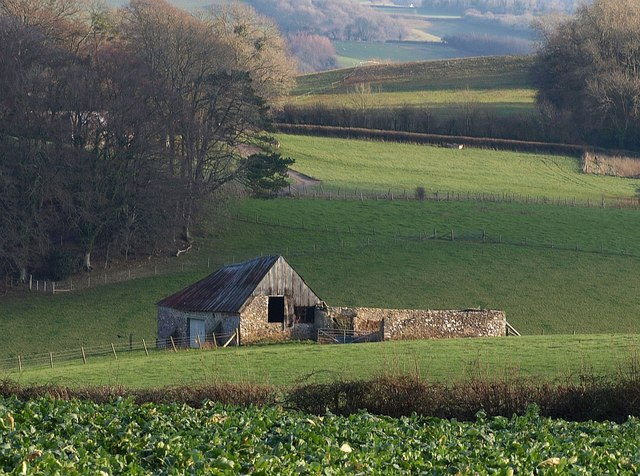
Woods Barn Outfarm, Ipplepen, Devon – A Grade II listed building

An outfarm is a smaller cluster of buildings set around a yard which provides facilities for outlying fields separate from the main farmsteads. They are often considered alongside field barns as enabling larger farms to work more distant fields more efficiently. However, they are usually somewhat larger. Examples of facilities include shelter for cattle, threshing floors, and other storage facilities. Some outfarms included cottages to house the workers located there.

Some outfarms have become listed buildings as they provide an important surviving example of the local regional character. Often they indicate a local response to the development of farming methods in the nineteenth century and are built from local materials in a vernacular style. An example is Wood Barn Outfarm in Ipplepen.
