= Philip Dougherty Tavern =

- U.S. National Register of Historic Places
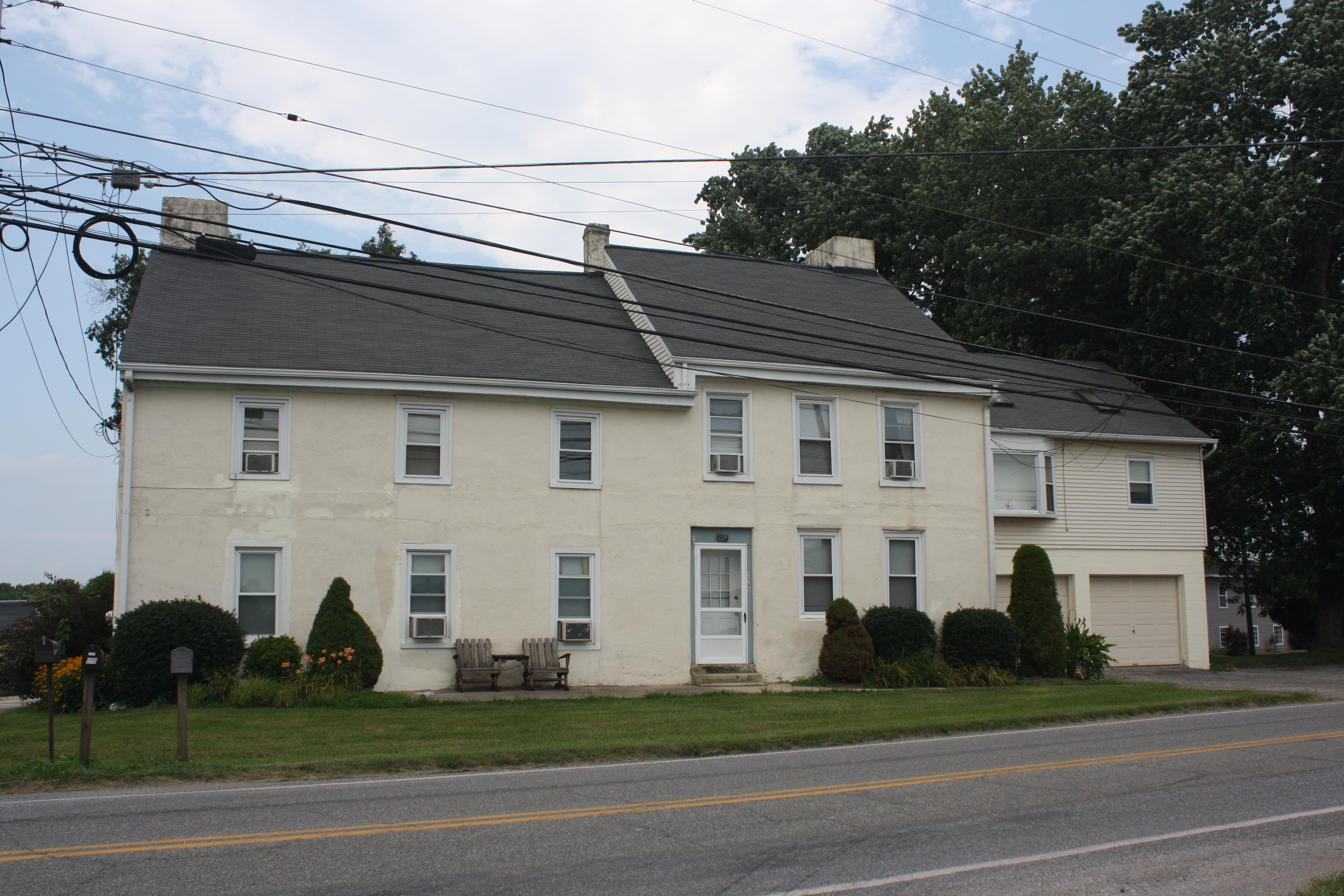
- Philip Dougherty Tavern. July 2013.

- Location within Pennsylvania Location within the United States
- Location: Strasburg Road near Coatesville, East Fallowfield Township, Pennsylvania
- Coordinates: 39°57′40″N 75°51′42″W
- Area: 0.5 acres (0.20 ha)
- Architectural style: Federal
- MPS: Strasburg Road TR;East Fallowfield Township MRA
- NRHP reference No.: 85002391
- Added to NRHP: September 18, 1985

The Philip Dougherty Tavern, also known as the Humphreyville Hotel, is an historic inn and tavern in East Fallowfield Township, Chester County, Pennsylvania, United States.

Situated directly across the road from the Philip Dougherty House, it was added to the National Register of Historic Places in 1985.

== History and architectural features ==
This historic structure was built circa 1778, and is a two-story, six-bay, stuccoed, stone structure with a gable roof. The Marquis de Lafayette stopped for lunch at the tavern on his grand tour in 1825.
