= English barn =

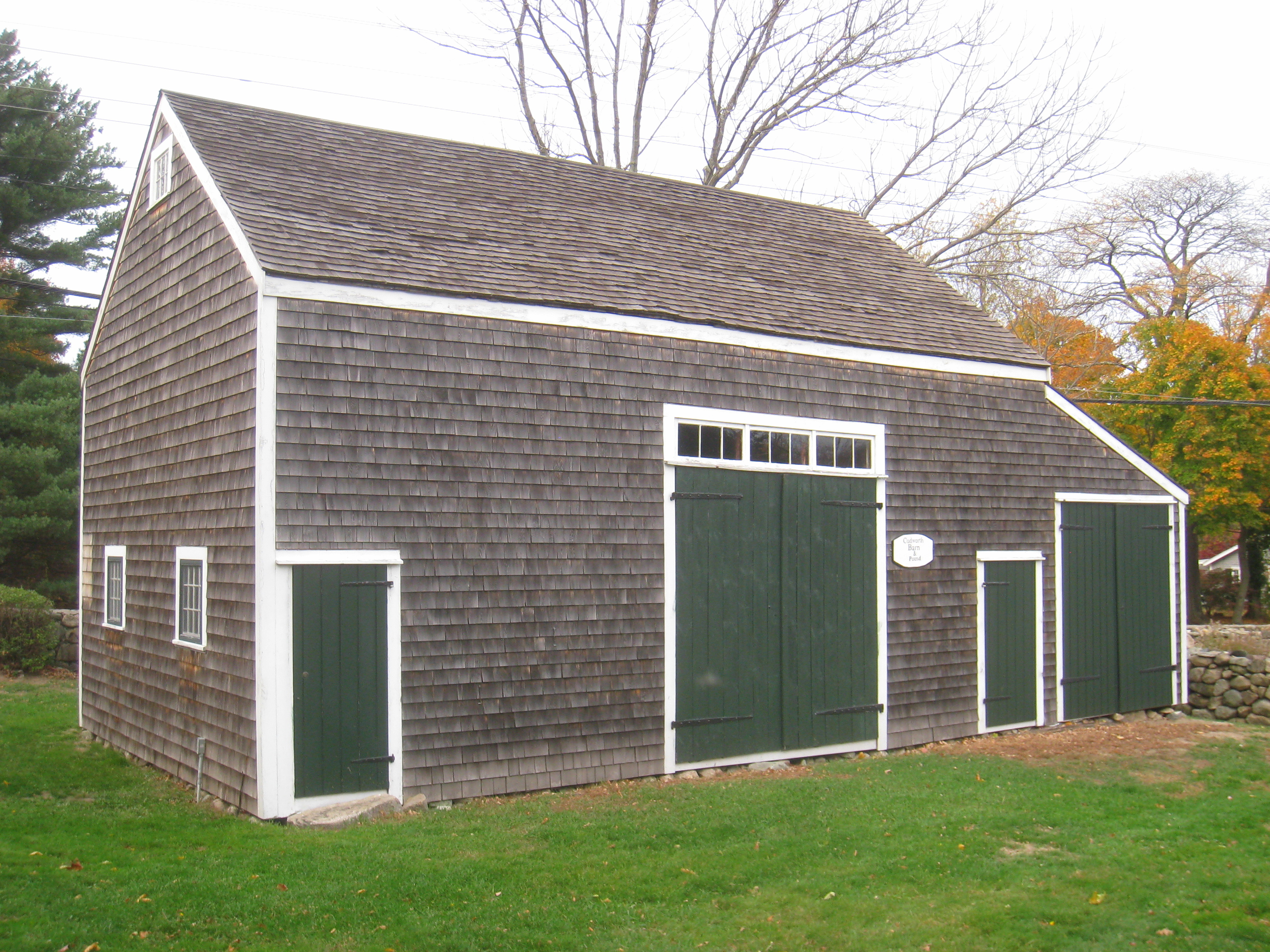
A common door arrangement of the three-bay barn, but with a shed-roof addition to the right side.

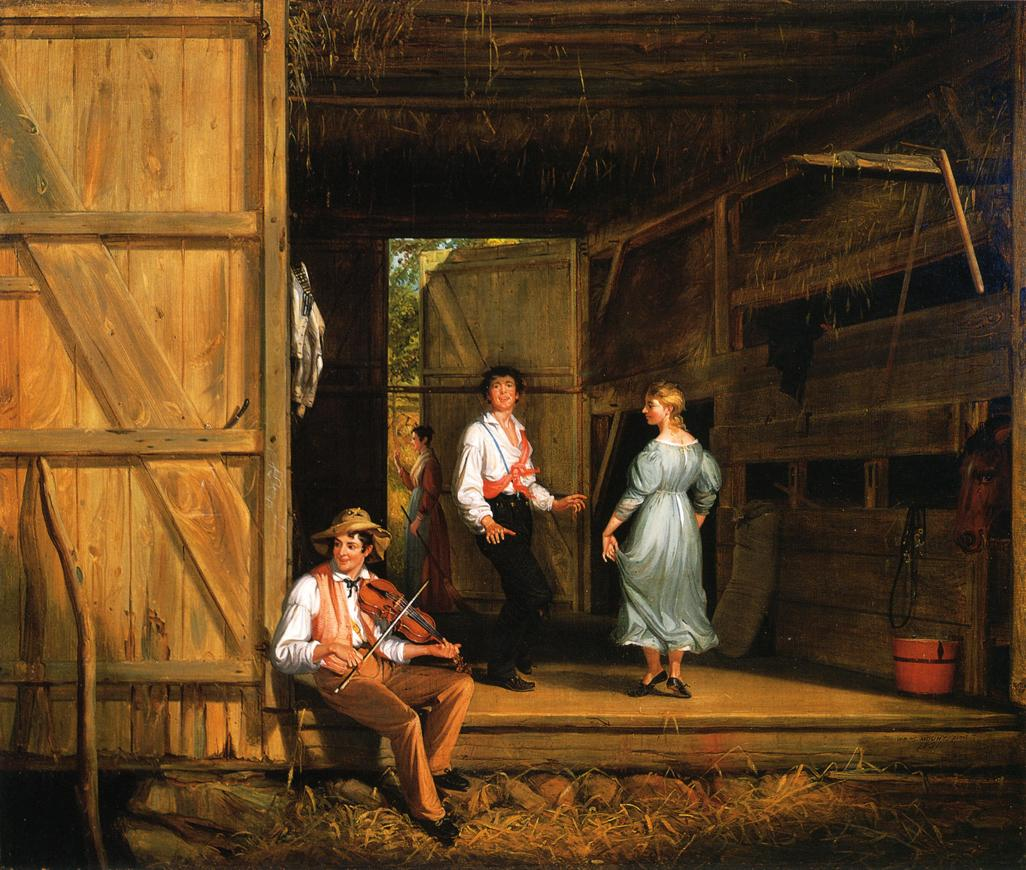
A romantic view of the threshing floor. Doors on both side-walls was common but not universal. The swinging doors are typical but here they are a rare type called haar hung (they are suspended from one of the door stiles).

The English barn, or three-bay barn, is a barn style that was most popular in the northeast region of the US, but are the most widespread barn type in America. This barn type is, with the New World Dutch barn, the oldest type and has been called the "...grandfather of the American barn." New barns in this style were constructed for over a century, from the 1770s through the 1900s.

== Design ==
The early pioneers brought with them a barn design inherited from the first colonists. An average English barn measured thirty feet by forty feet and had a large double wagon door on its lateral side and unpainted vertical boards covering the walls. English barns were normally without a basement and stood on level ground. The interior of the barns were characterized by a center driveway which acted as a threshing floor, similar to the breezeway of a crib barn. The double doors generally opened onto the center drive which divided the building into two separate areas, one for hay and grain storage and the other for livestock.

== See also ==
- New England barn
