= Prairie barn =

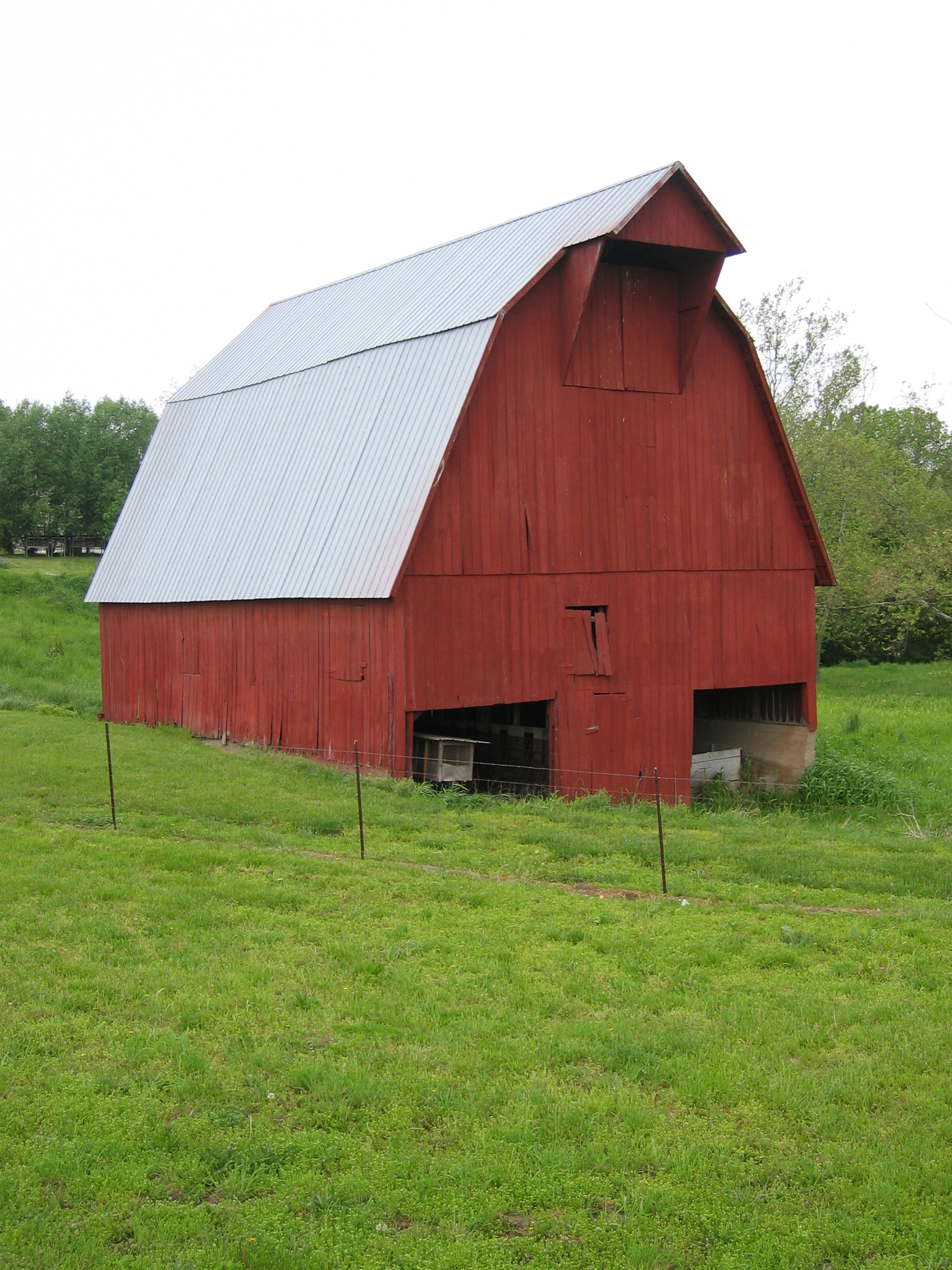
A prairie barn in Greene County, Indiana, with a prominent hay hood. Note the low hanging gambrel roof.

The design of a prairie barn, also known as the Western barn, reflects the iconic image of an American barn. The peak roof over the hay loft is what helps give the prairie barn its familiarity across the landscape. It was popularized during the settlement of the American West during the 19th century.

== Design ==
Large herds of cattle, associated mostly with the American West, required vast amounts of space for hay and feed. Prairie barns are generally larger than other types of barns. The long, sweeping style roofs, sometimes reaching very near the ground, are trademark of prairie barns. The large roof areas provided for more storage space. Later in the 19th century barn architects adopted gambrel roofs, which provided even more storage space. Prairie barns share a number of features with the historic Dutch barn design. Long, low roof lines, gable end doors and the internal dispersal of stable stalls in aisles astride a central hallway are all elements of Dutch barns.
