= Bank barn =

Barn accessible at ground level on two separate levels

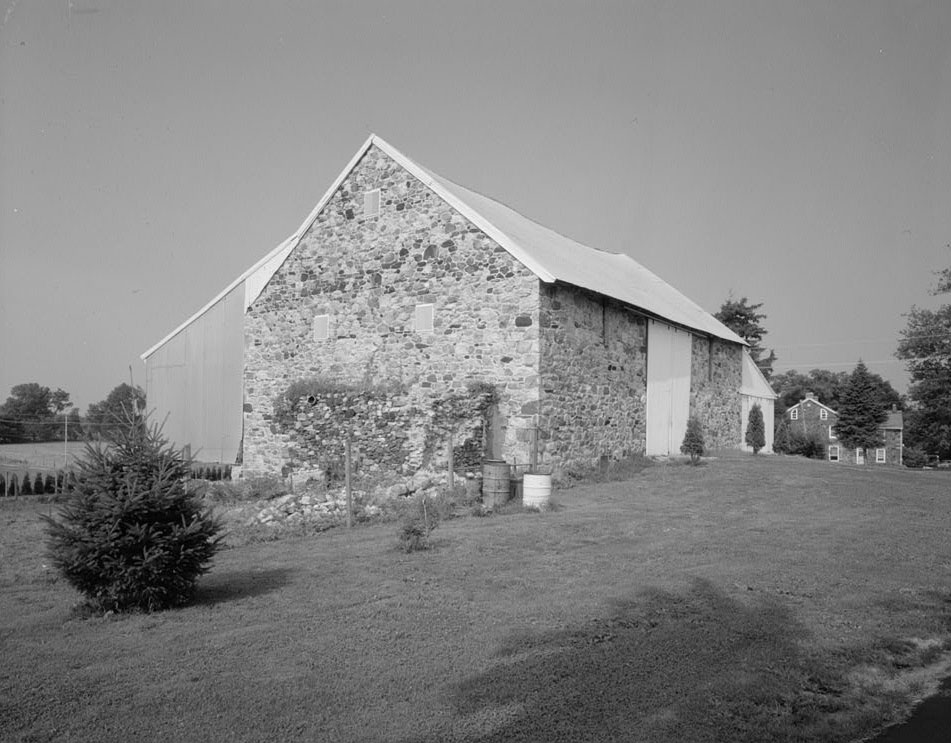
A bank barn in Delaware. Note its accessibility on two different levels.

A bank barn or banked barn is a style of barn which is accessible from the ground, on two separate levels. Often built into the side of a hill or bank, the upper and the lower floors could both be accessed from the ground, one area at the top of the hill and the other at the bottom. The second level of a bank barn could also be accessed from a ramp if a hill was unavailable.

Examples of bank barns can be found in the United Kingdom, in the United States, in eastern Canada, in Norway, in the Dordogne in France, and in Umbria, Italy, among other places.

== Bank barns in the United Kingdom ==
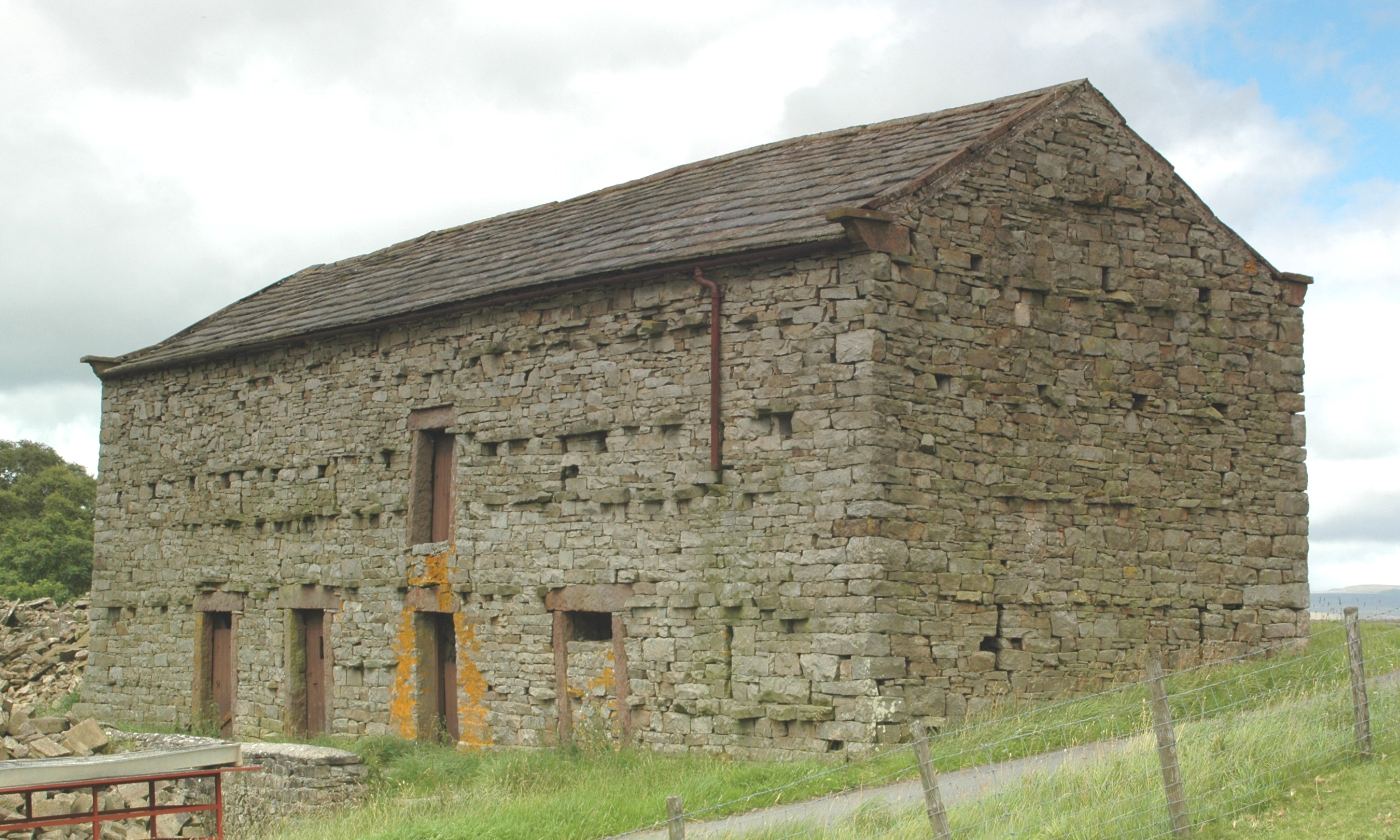
A bank barn near Barras, Cumbria (formerly Westmorland). The lower side of this example has four doorways, one now blocked, to different spaces for livestock

Bank barns are especially common in the upland areas of Britain, in Northumberland and Cumbria in northern England and in Devon in the southwest.

=== History ===
The origins of bank barns in the UK are obscure. The bank barn had made its first appearance in Cumbria by the 1660s on the farms of wealthy farmers: here, farmers bought drove cattle from Scotland and fattened them over winter before selling them in spring. The bank barn at Townend Farm, Troutbeck in former Cumberland, was built for the prominent Browne family in 1666. The great majority of bank barns were built in Cumbria between 1750 and 1860, and the last were built just before World War I.

=== Design ===
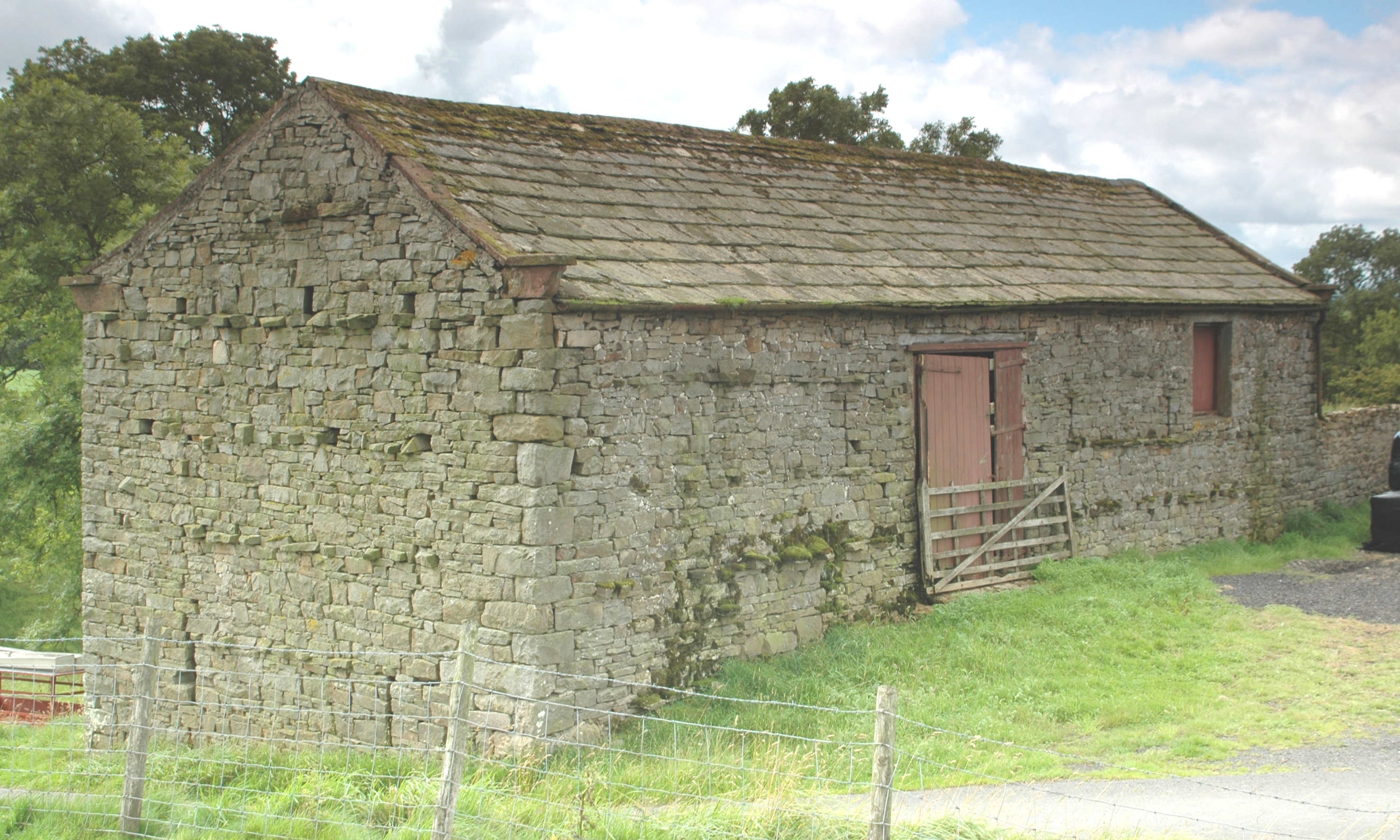
The same bank barn near Barras. The upper side has one double doorway for access to the threshing floor.

Usually stone-built, British bank barns are rectangular buildings. They usually have a central threshing area with hay or corn (cereal) storage bays on either side on the upper floor; and byres, stables, cartshed, or other rooms below. Double doors entered the threshing barn on the upper floor in the long wall approached from a raised bank: these banks could be artificially created. Opposite the main doors was a small winnowing door that opened high above the farmyard level. A common arrangement had an open-fronted single bay cartshed below the threshing floor, with stables on one side and a cow-house on the other. The entrances to these lower floor rooms were protected from above in many cases by a continuous canopy, or pentise carried on timber or stone beams cantilevered from the main wall. Brick-built bank barns are less common.

In the 1660s, Sir Daniel Fleming of Rydal Hall in the Lake District housed 44 cattle in his 74 feet (23 m) long bank barn at Low Park. The cattle faced the side walls and backed onto a central manure passage. In other bank barns in Cumbria, the side walls entrances gave access to a cow-house, stable, and cartshed; some 19th-century examples have four-horse stables, root houses (for storage of root crops for fodder), and feeding and dung passages for the cows.

As well as the true bank barns that occur in a small concentration in Devon, a variation on the bank barn is also found in Devon and Cornwall where the upper floor is accessed by external stone steps rather than the hillside or a ramp.

=== Terminology ===
The architectural historian Ronald Brunskill states that, although the British examples are older, the term "bank barn" is an imported term "to describe a type of farm building which is so common in certain parts of Britain that it has developed no descriptive term of its own".

== Bank barns in the United States ==
Bank barns were a popular 19th-century barn style in the US. These structures were sometimes called "basement barns" because of their exposed basement story.

=== Pennsylvania ===
In the Pennsylvania barn, the upper floor was a hayloft and the lower a stable area. The barn doors were typically on the sidewall. With William Penn's promise of freedom and inexpensive land, many settlers came to Pennsylvania. Among these settlers were the Germans, who began to build bank barns on their land. Many other settlers followed this practice, and it was soon the most common type of barn in Pennsylvania during the colonial era. The Pennsylvania Barn is a specific type of bank barn with a forebay, a projecting floor on one or more sides of the barn. All forebay barns are bank barns, but not all bank barns are forebay barns. Robert F. Ensminger, in his book The Pennsylvania Barn: Its Origin, Evolution, and Distribution in North America, identifies three basic types of Pennsylvania barn: the Sweitzer, standard, and extended.

The English Lake District bank barn is another type found only in Pennsylvania.

=== New England ===
The New England barn is from a different tradition than the Pennsylvania Barn. In New England, the barn doors are always on the gable end. The cows were on the main level, hay in a mow on the main level and/or above in haylofts, possibly grain storage on the main level, sometimes a tack room or workshop, and the basement was used for manure management and other tasks. The New England barn, developed in the early 19th century, became the most popular barn type after 1850, replacing the smaller, side-entry English barn and are almost always square rule framing.

Similar barns are also found in upstate New York and westward Canada.

=== Design ===
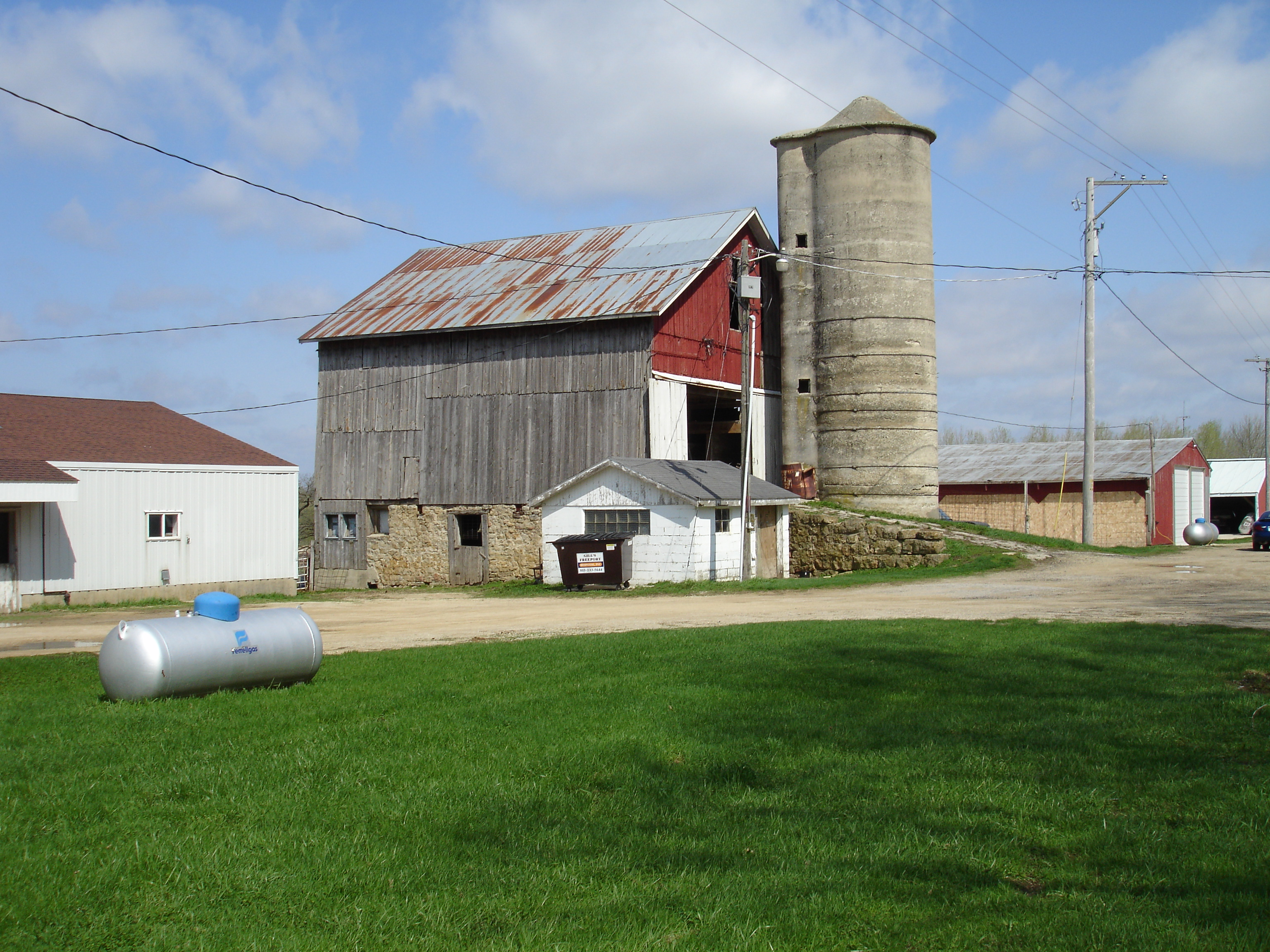
This bank barn in Illinois has a ramp of dirt and stone.

The design of some bank barns is called a "high-drive bank barn" allowed wagons to enter directly into the hay loft, making unloading the hay easier. Sometimes the high-drive was accessed by an earthen or wood ramp, and sometimes the ramp was covered like a bridge to make it more durable. In the Pennsylvania barns, the animals were housed on the basement level. In many other bank barns, the tie-ups were on the upper-ground level, and below the stables, a basement usually acted as a manure collection area. Many bank barns have a small incline leading up to the loft area instead of a ramp. Some bank barns are constructed directly into existing hillsides, while others are fitted with built-up earthen and stone areas to create the characteristic bank. The design is similar to English barns except for the bank and basement aspects. The basement space could be utilized for animals while the area above, easily accessed by wagon because of the bank, could be used for feed and grain storage. Bank barns can be considered English barns raised on an exposed full basement.

== See also ==
- Pennsylvania barn
