= Granary =

Storage building for grain

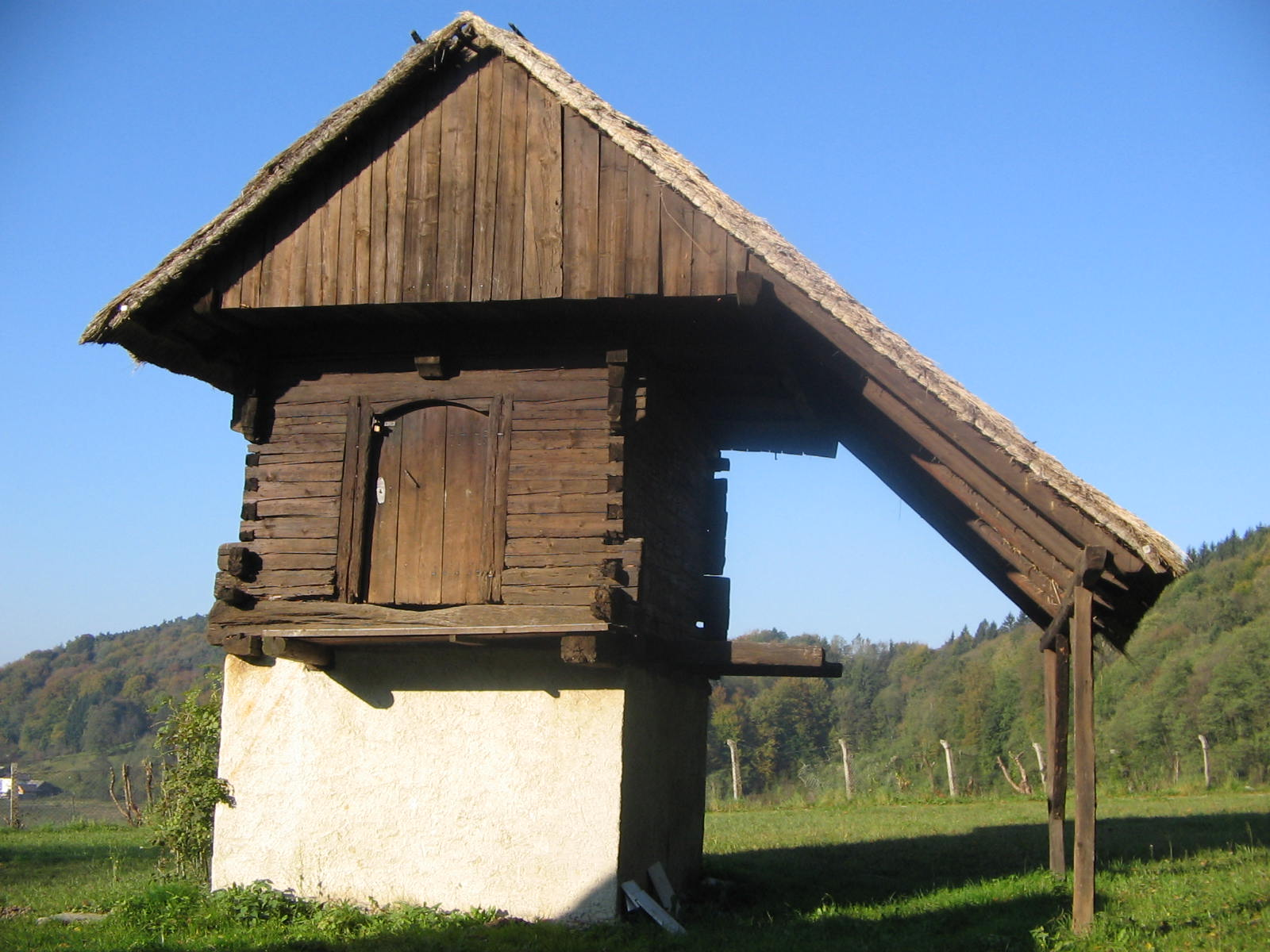
A small granary (early 19th century), Slovenia

A granary, also known as a grain house and historically as a granarium in Latin, and granon in classical Hebrew, is a post-harvest storage building primarily for grains or seeds. Granaries are typically built above the ground to prevent spoilage and protect the stored grains or seeds from rodents, pests, floods, and adverse weather conditions. They also assist in drying the grains to prevent mold growth. Modern granaries may incorporate advanced ventilation and temperature control systems to preserve the quality of the stored grains.

== Early origins ==
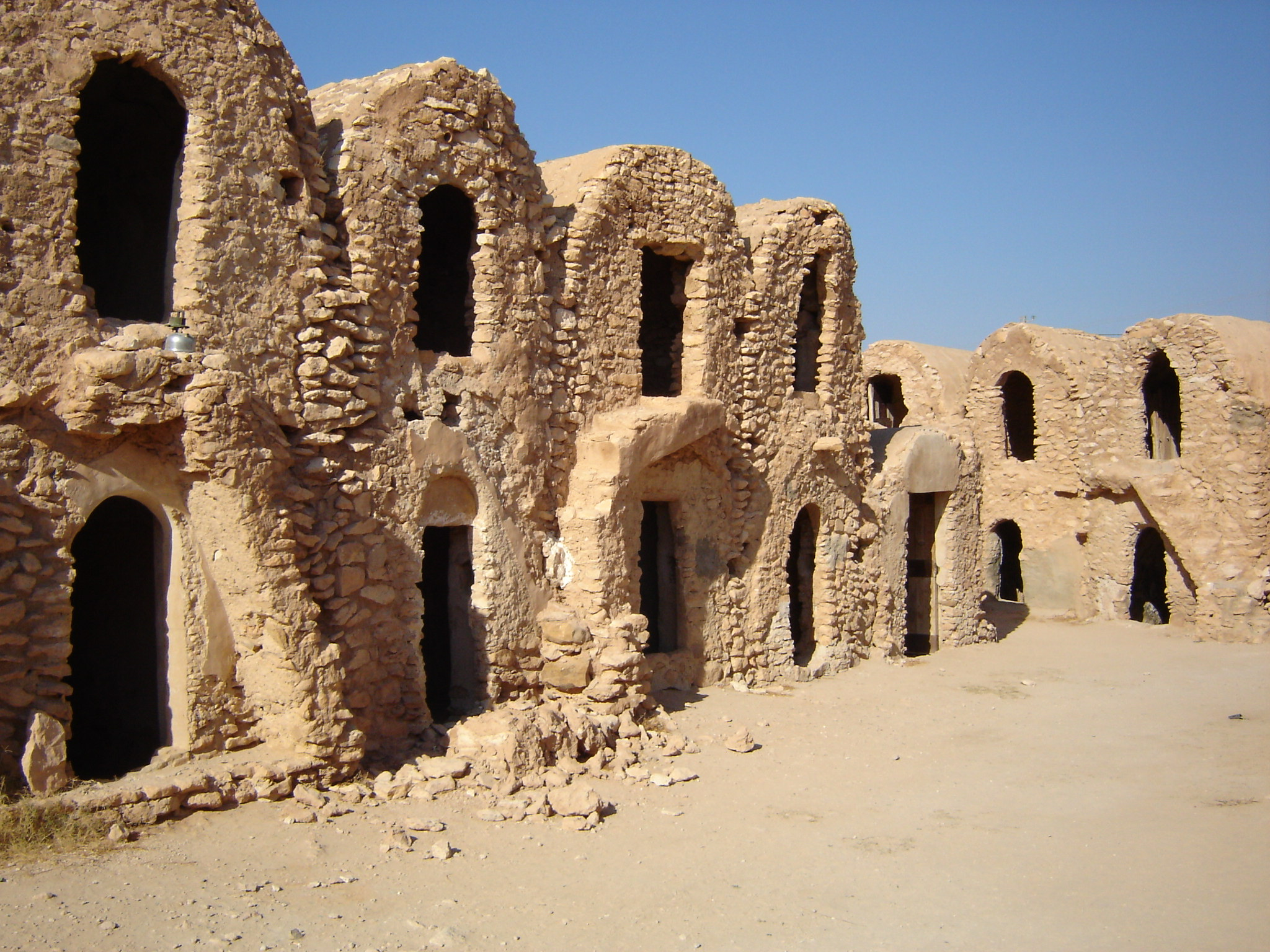
Grain storage chambers (ghorfas) of Ksar Hadada, southern Tunisia. Ksar Hadada is a fortified granary village that was built by North African Berber communities to store grain and crops

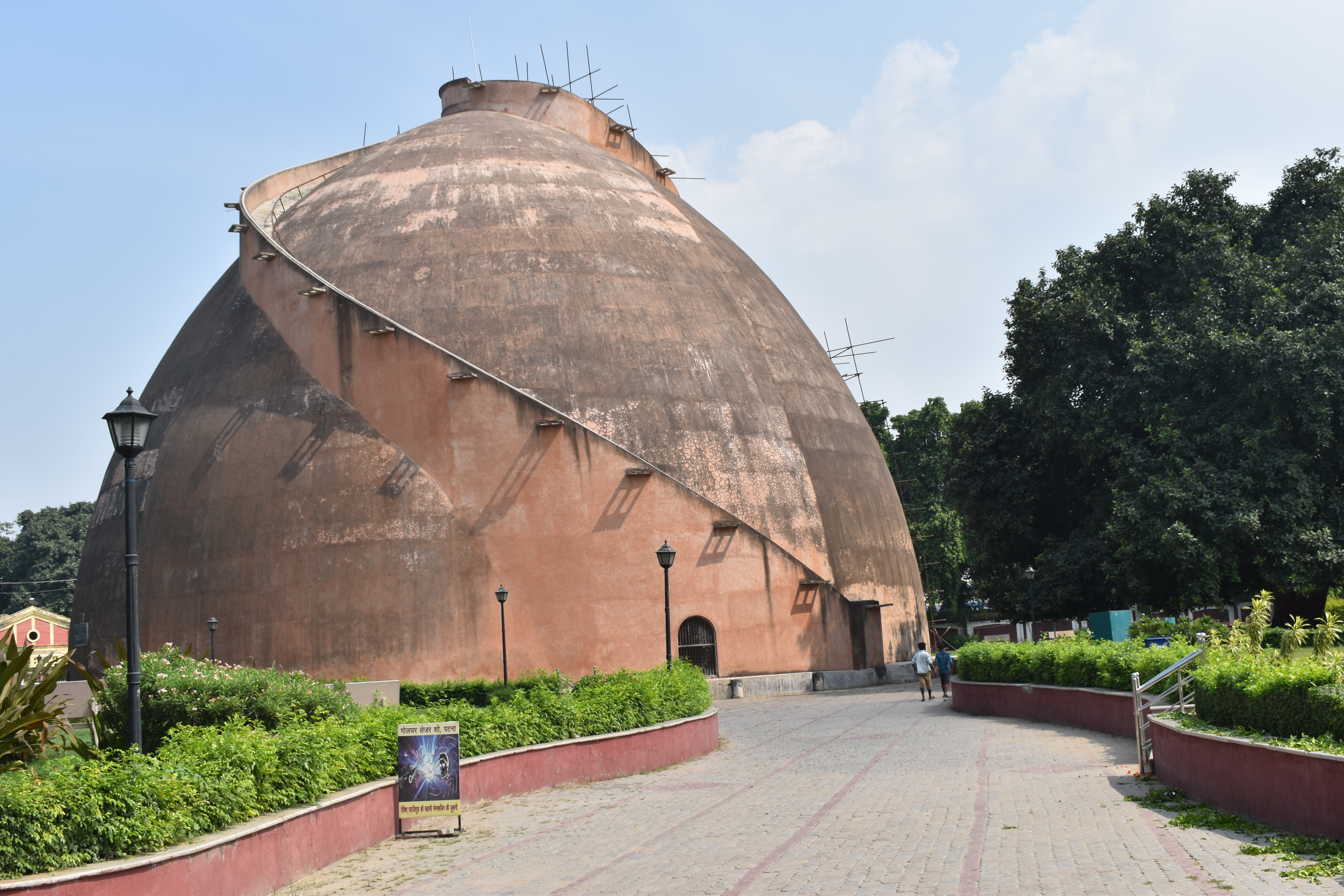
Golghar granary built in 1786, Patna, India

Grain has been stored in bulk since ancient times. The oldest known granaries date back to 9500 BC and are located in the Pre-Pottery Neolithic A settlements in the Jordan Valley. The first were located in places between other buildings. Beginning around 8500 BC, however, they were moved inside houses, and by 7500 BC special rooms were used for storage. The first granaries measured 3 x 3 m on the outside and had suspended floors that protected the grain from rodents and insects and provided air circulation.

These granaries are followed by those in Mehrgarh in the Indus Valley from 6000 BC. The ancient Egyptians made a practice of preserving grain in years of plenty against years of scarcity. Because the climate of Egypt is very dry, grain could be stored in pits for a long time without discernible loss of quality.

Historically, a silo was a pit for storing grain. It is distinct from a granary, which is an above-ground structure.

== East Asia ==
Simple storage granaries raised on four or more posts appeared in the Yangshao culture in China and after the onset of intensive agriculture in the Korean peninsula during the Mumun pottery period (c. 1000 B.C.) as well as in the Japanese archipelago during the Final Jōmon/Early Yayoi periods (c. 800 B.C.). In the archaeological vernacular of Northeast Asia, these features are lumped with those that may have also functioned as residences and together are called 'raised floor buildings'.

China built an elaborate system designed to minimize famine deaths. The system was destroyed in the Taiping Rebellion of the 1850s.

== Southeast Asia ==
In vernacular architecture of the Indonesian archipelago, granaries are made of wood and bamboo materials, and most of them are built and raised on four or more posts to avoid rodents and pests. Examples of Indonesian granary styles are the Sundanese leuit and Minang rangkiang.

== Great Britain ==
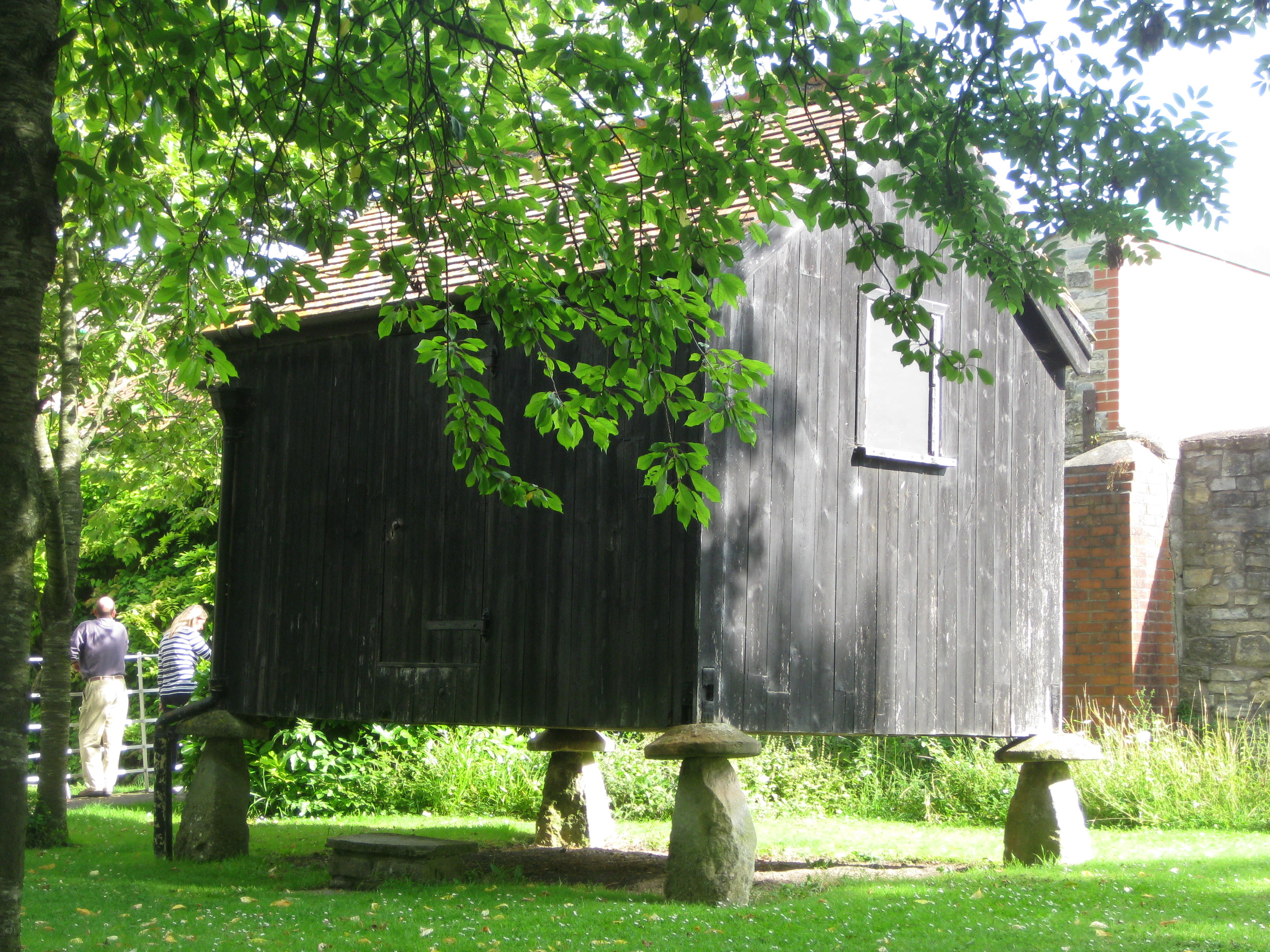
A granary sitting on staddle stones, at the Somerset Rural Life Museum

In the South Hams in southwest Great Britain, small granaries were built on mushroom-shaped stumps called staddle stones. They were built of timber-frame construction and often had slate roofs. Larger ones were similar to linhays but with the upper floor enclosed. Access to the first floor was usually via a stone staircase on the outside wall.

Towards the close of the 19th century, warehouses specially intended for holding grain began to multiply in Great Britain. There are climatic difficulties in the way of storing grain in Great Britain on a large scale, but these difficulties have been largely overcome.

== Moisture control ==
Grain must be kept away from moisture for as long as possible to preserve it in good condition and prevent mold growth. Newly harvested grain brought into a granary tends to contain excess moisture, which encourages mold growth leading to fermentation and heating, both of which are undesirable and affect quality. Fermentation generally spoils grain and may cause chemical changes that create poisonous mycotoxins.

One traditional remedy is to spread the grain in thin layers on a floor, where it is turned to aerate it thoroughly. Once the grain is sufficiently dry it can be transferred to a granary for storage. Today, this can be done using a mechanical grain auger to move grain from one granary to another.

In modern silos, grain is typically force-aerated in situ or circulated through external grain drying equipment.

== Modern ==
Modern grain farming operations often use manufactured steel granaries to store grain on site until it can be trucked to major storage facilities in anticipation of shipping. The large mechanized facilities, particularly seen in Russia and North America, are known as grain elevators.

== Examples ==
Ancient, Traditional, and Modern Granaries

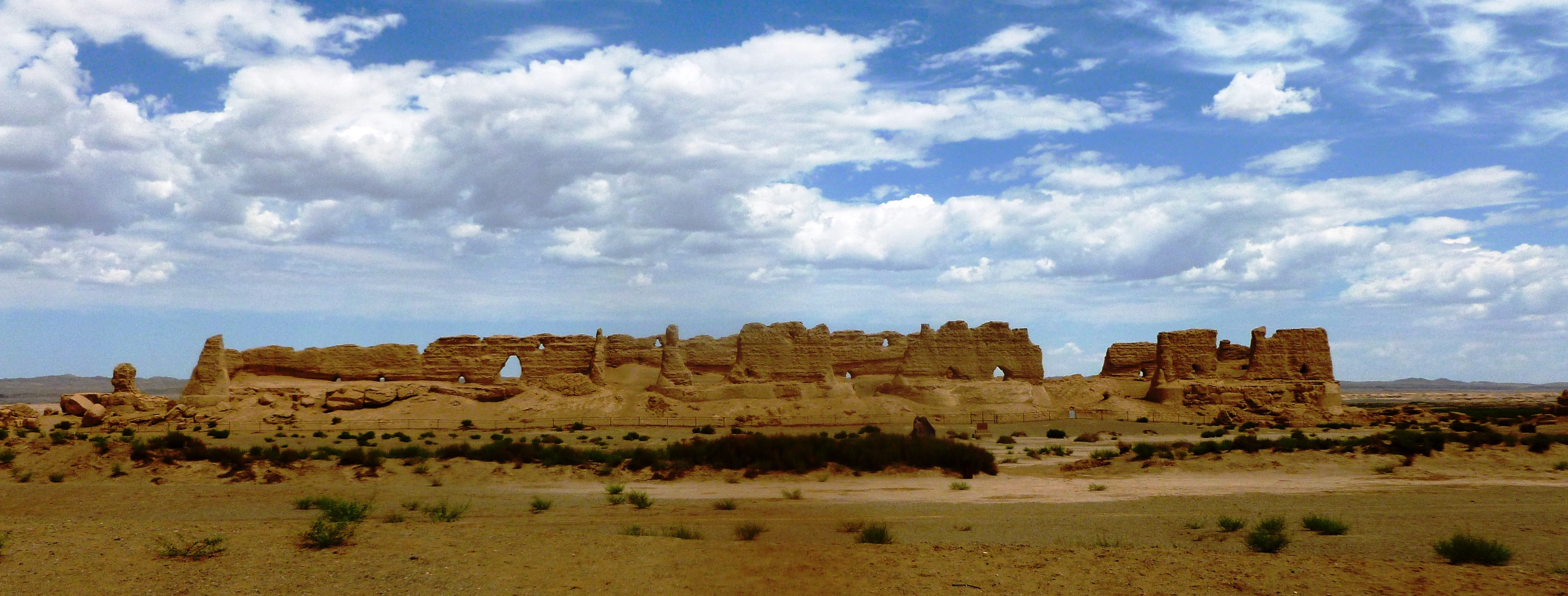
Han dynasty granary on Silk Road west of Dunhuang, China

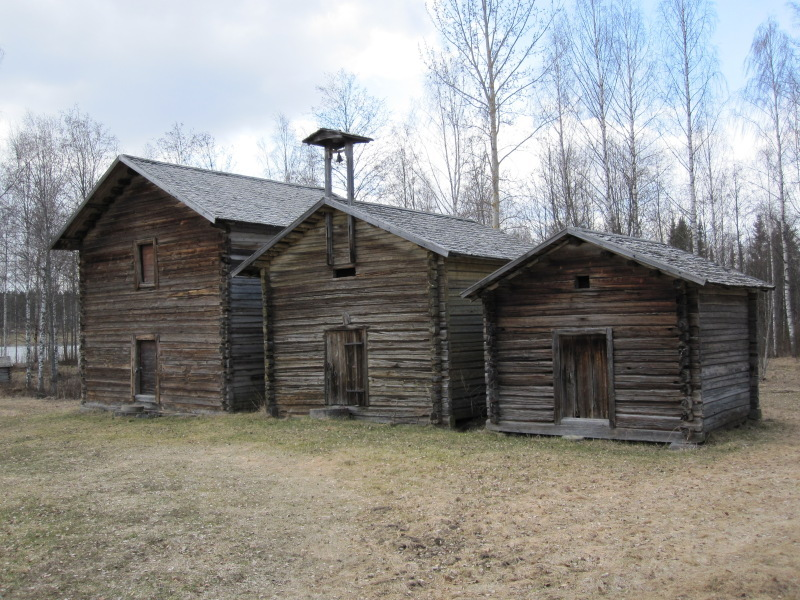
Wooden granaries of the local museum in Iisalmi, Finland

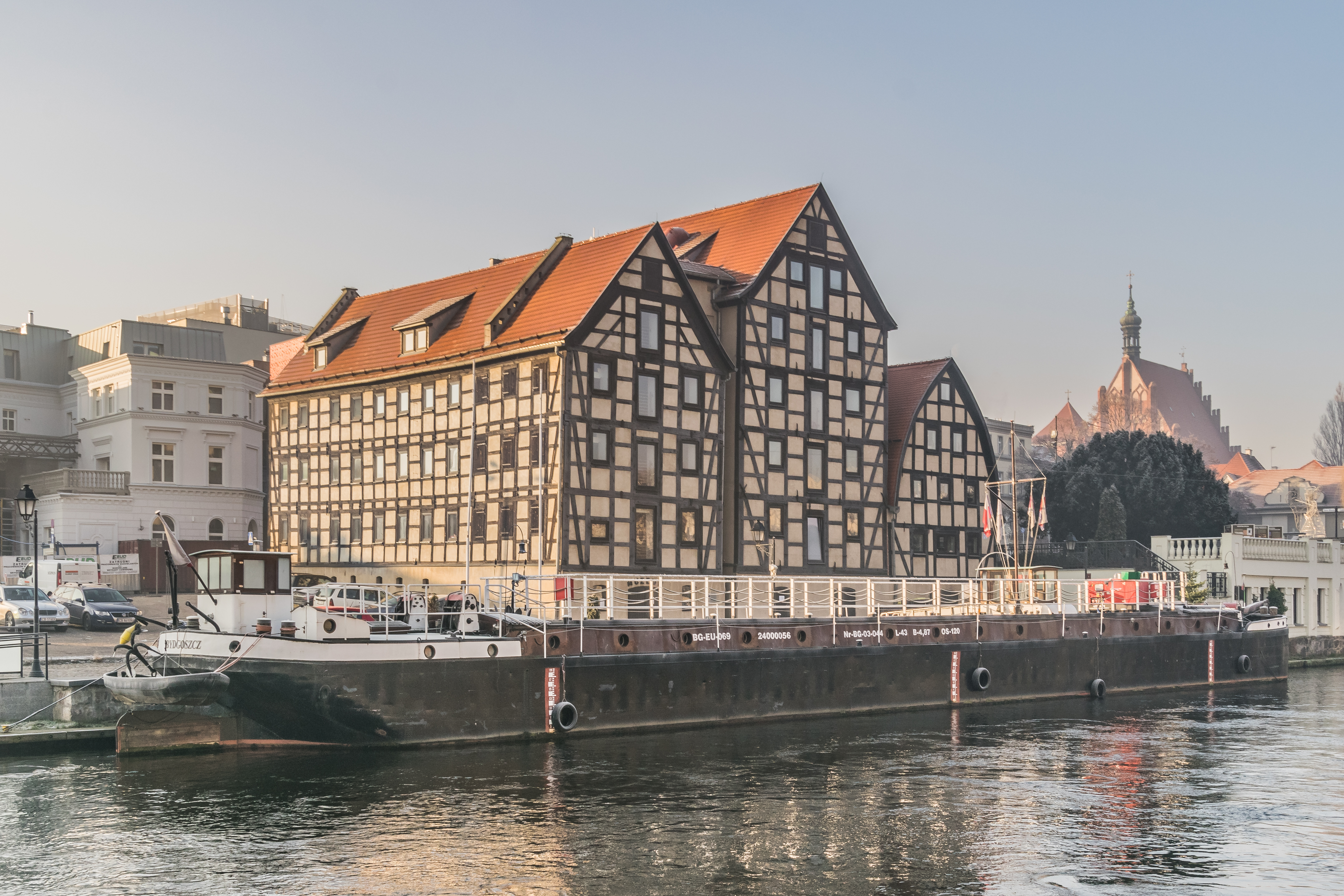
A large granary in Bydgoszcz, Poland, on the Brda River

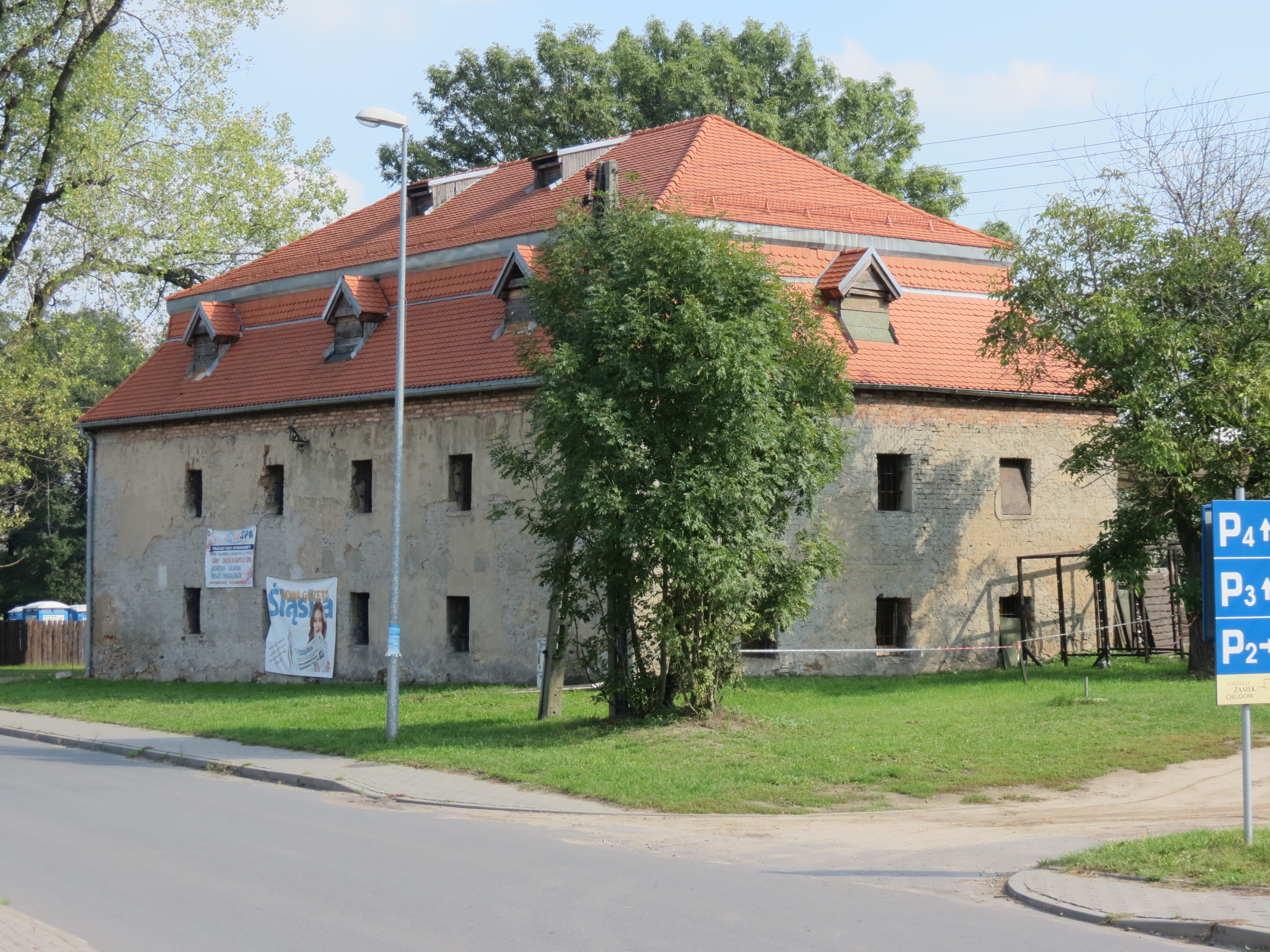
Chudów, Upper Silesia - manor granary, from the 18th century, brick construction (monument number A/569/66)

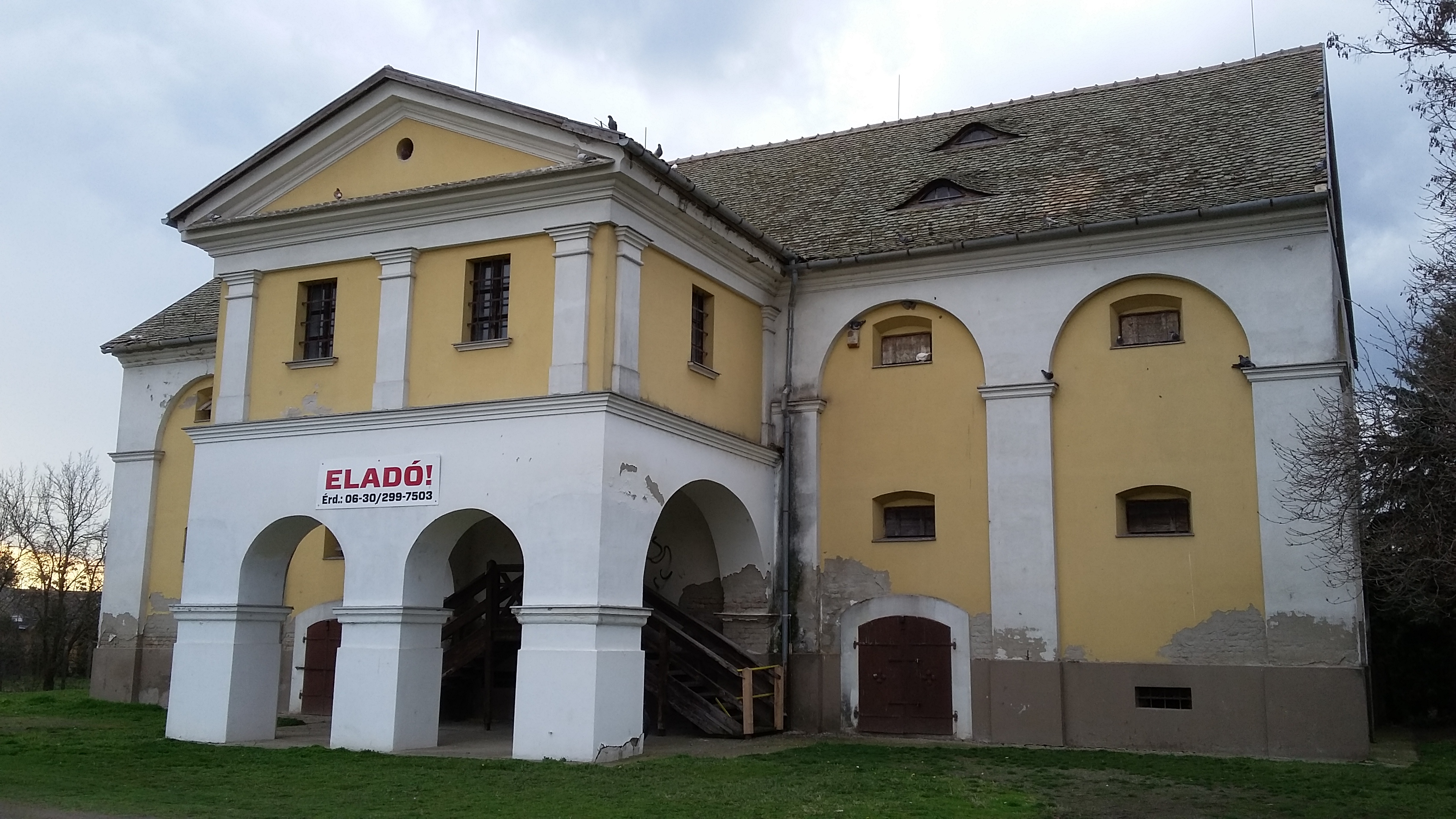
Multi-storey granary with portico, built in 1835, Kiszombor, Hungary

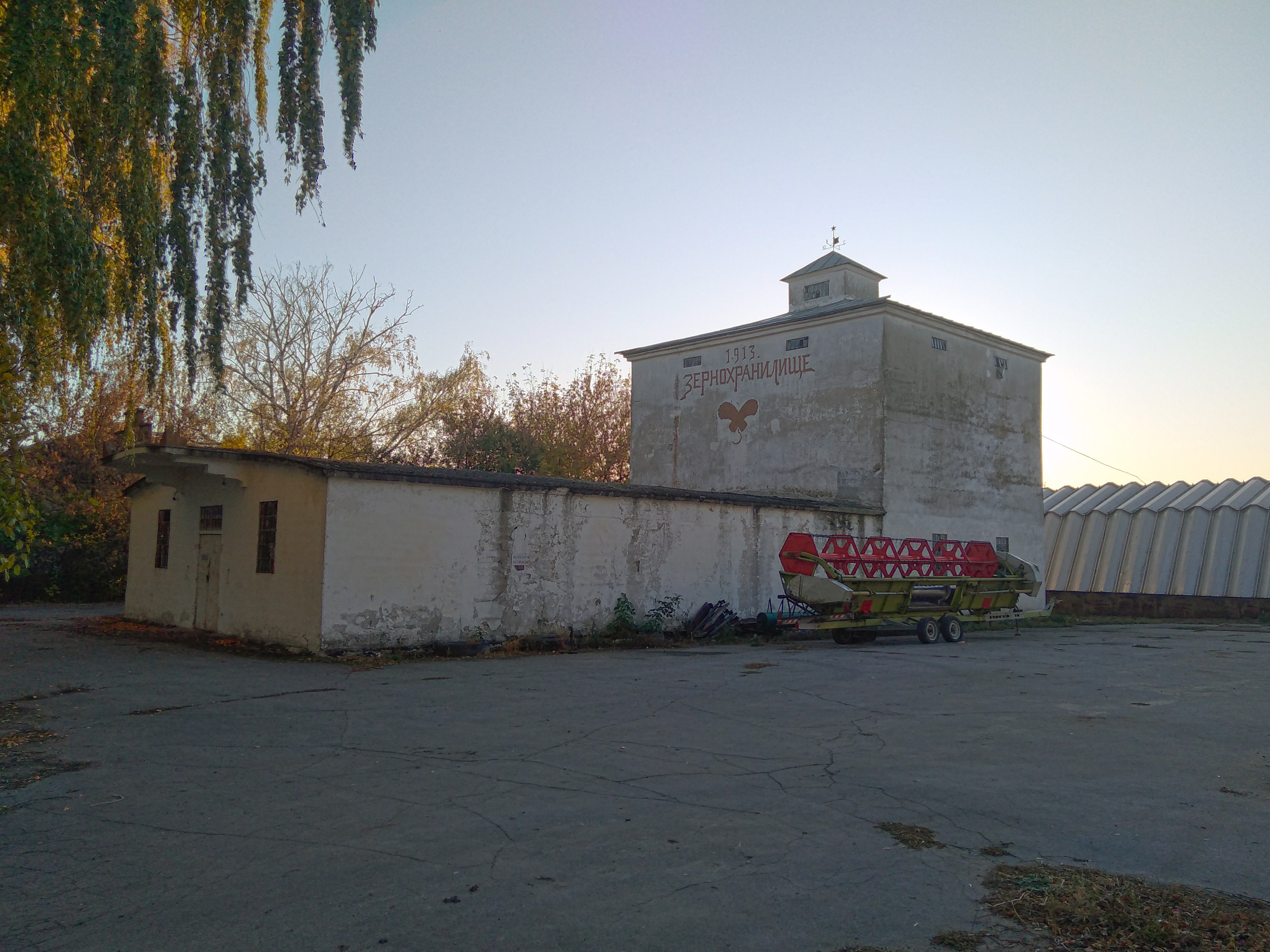
Granary in Verkhivnia, Ukraine, built in 1913

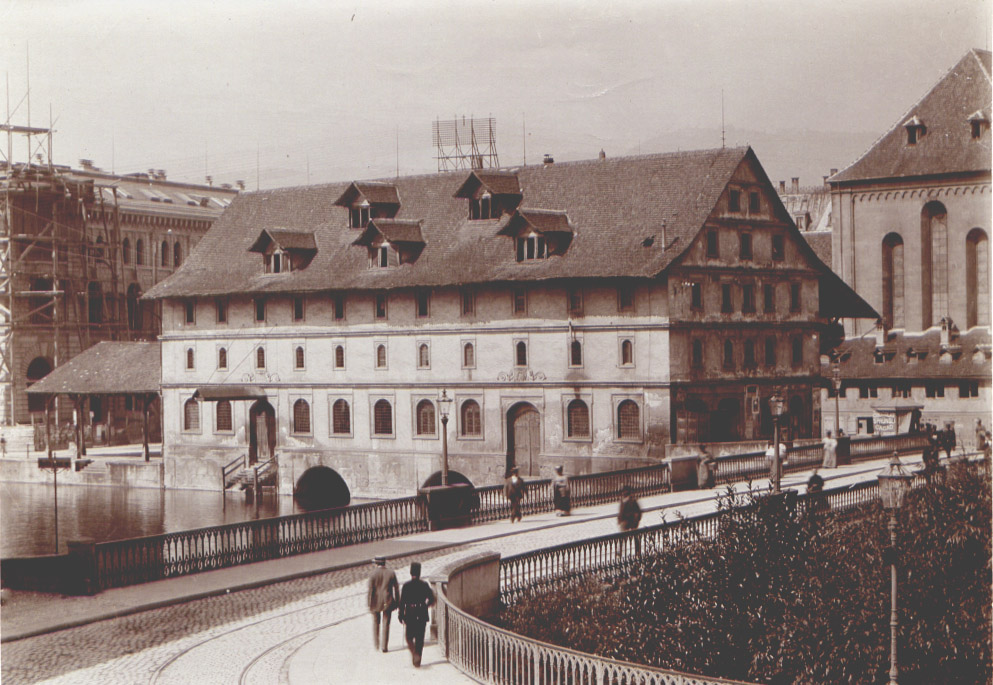
Former granary in Zürich, Switzerland, 1897

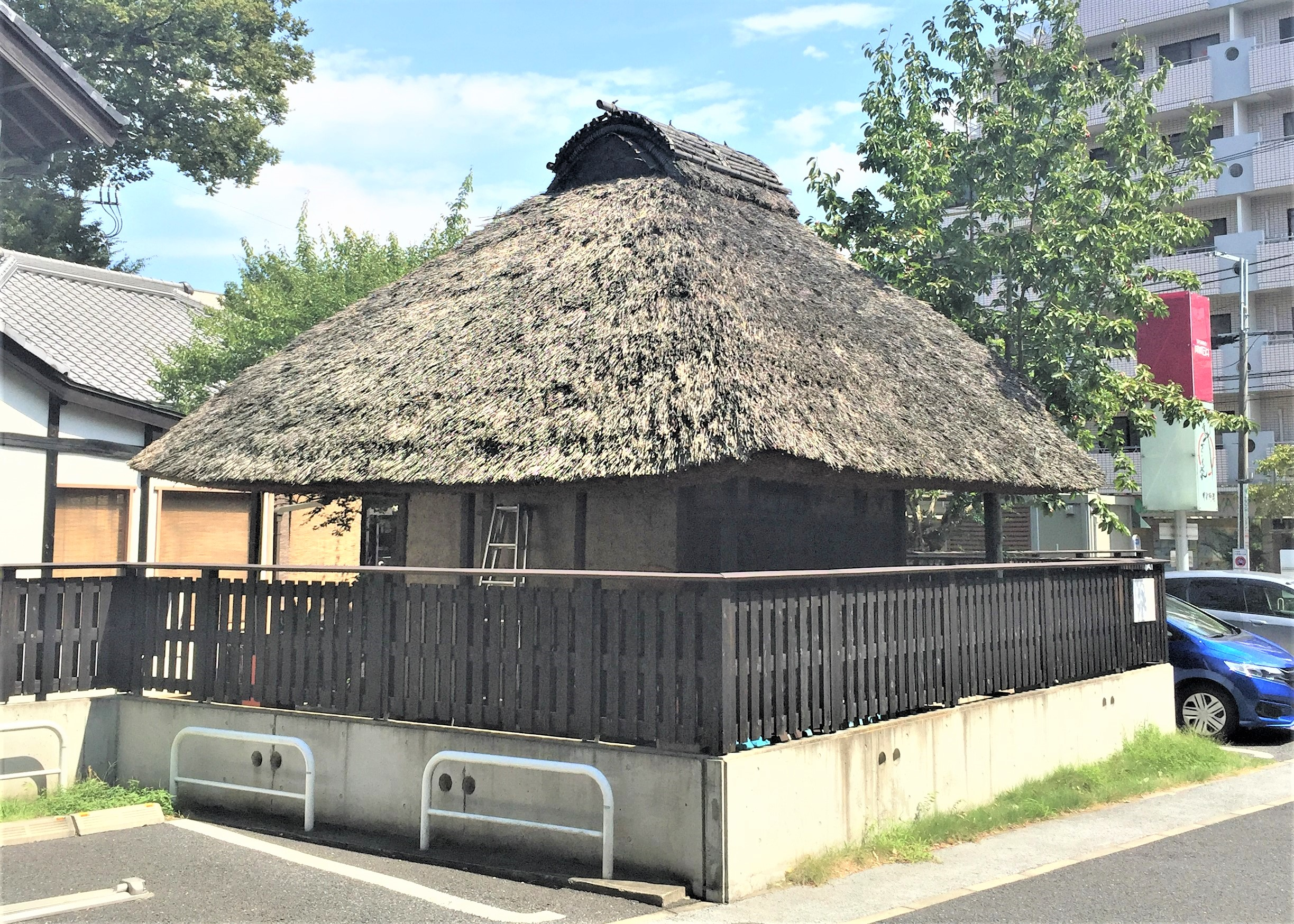
Meiji period granary, Setagaya, Tokyo, Japan

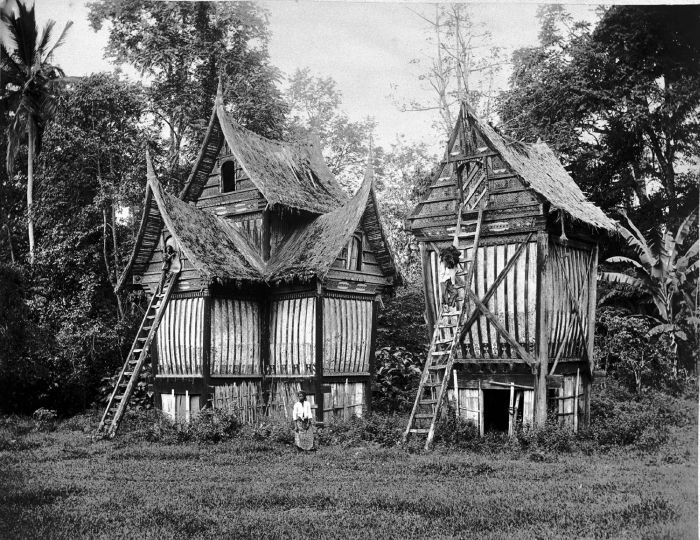
Two rangkiang in a photo c. 1895 of rice granaries in the Minangkabau architectural style in Batipuh in the Padang Plateau, Sumatra, Indonesia

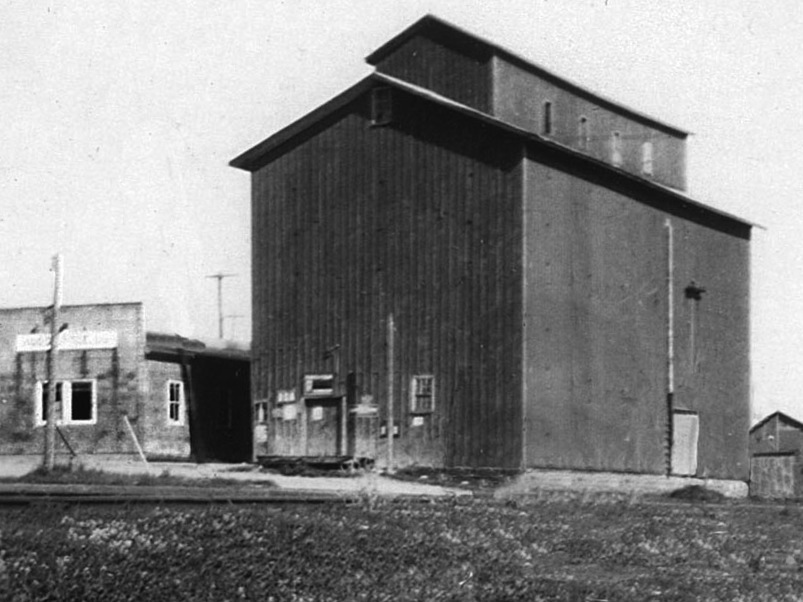
The Port Perry, Ontario, Canada mill and grain elevator, granary, built in 1873 (photographed c. 1930)

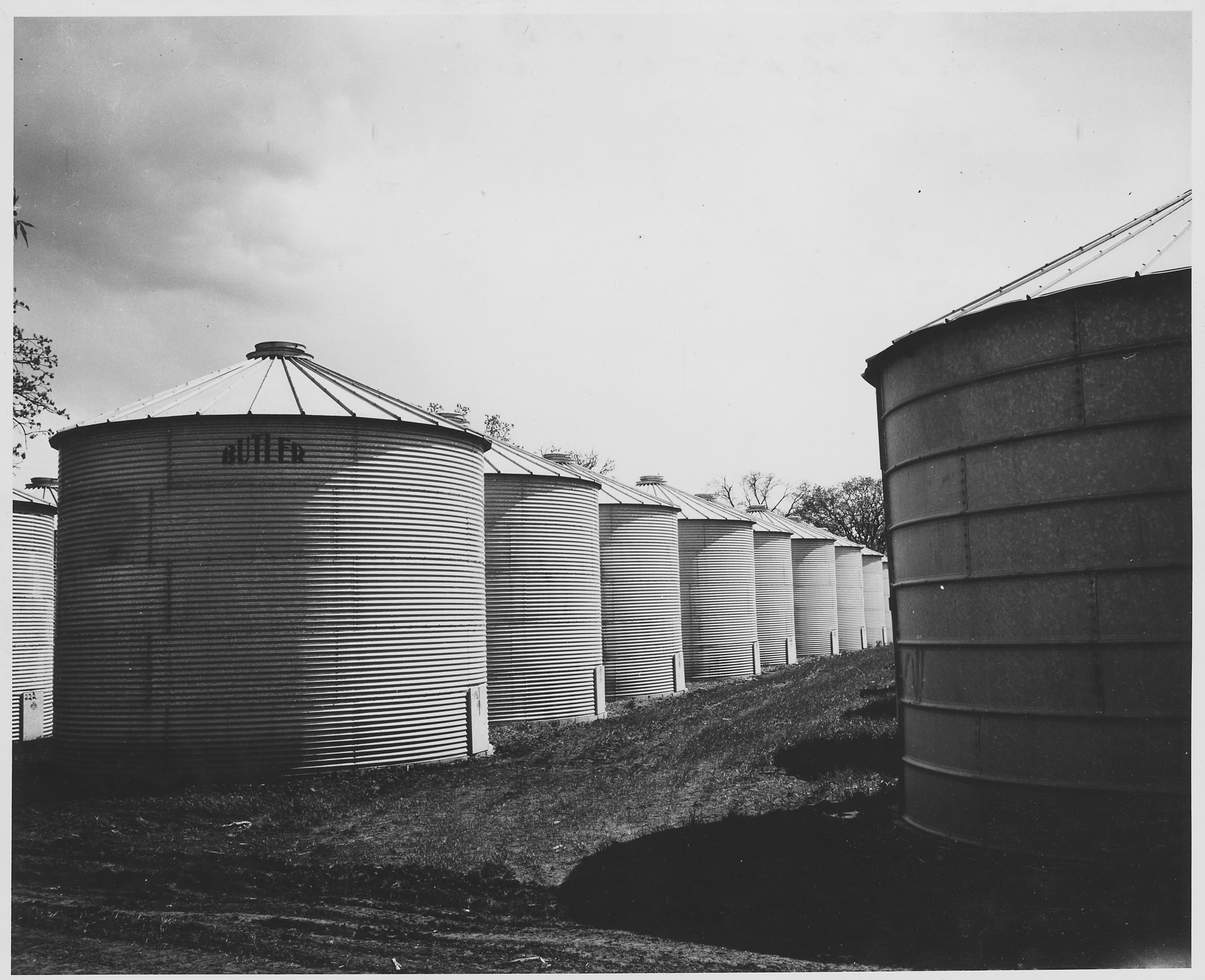
Modern steel granaries in Iowa, U.S.

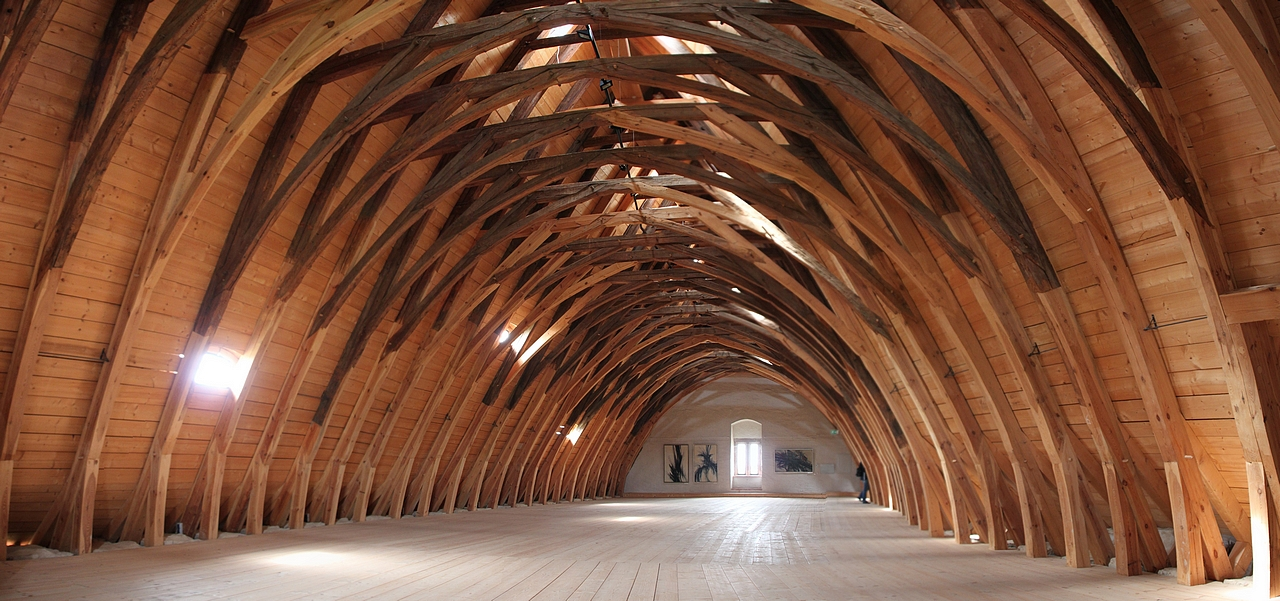
Grain House floor of Mildenstein Castle (built around 1395), Germany

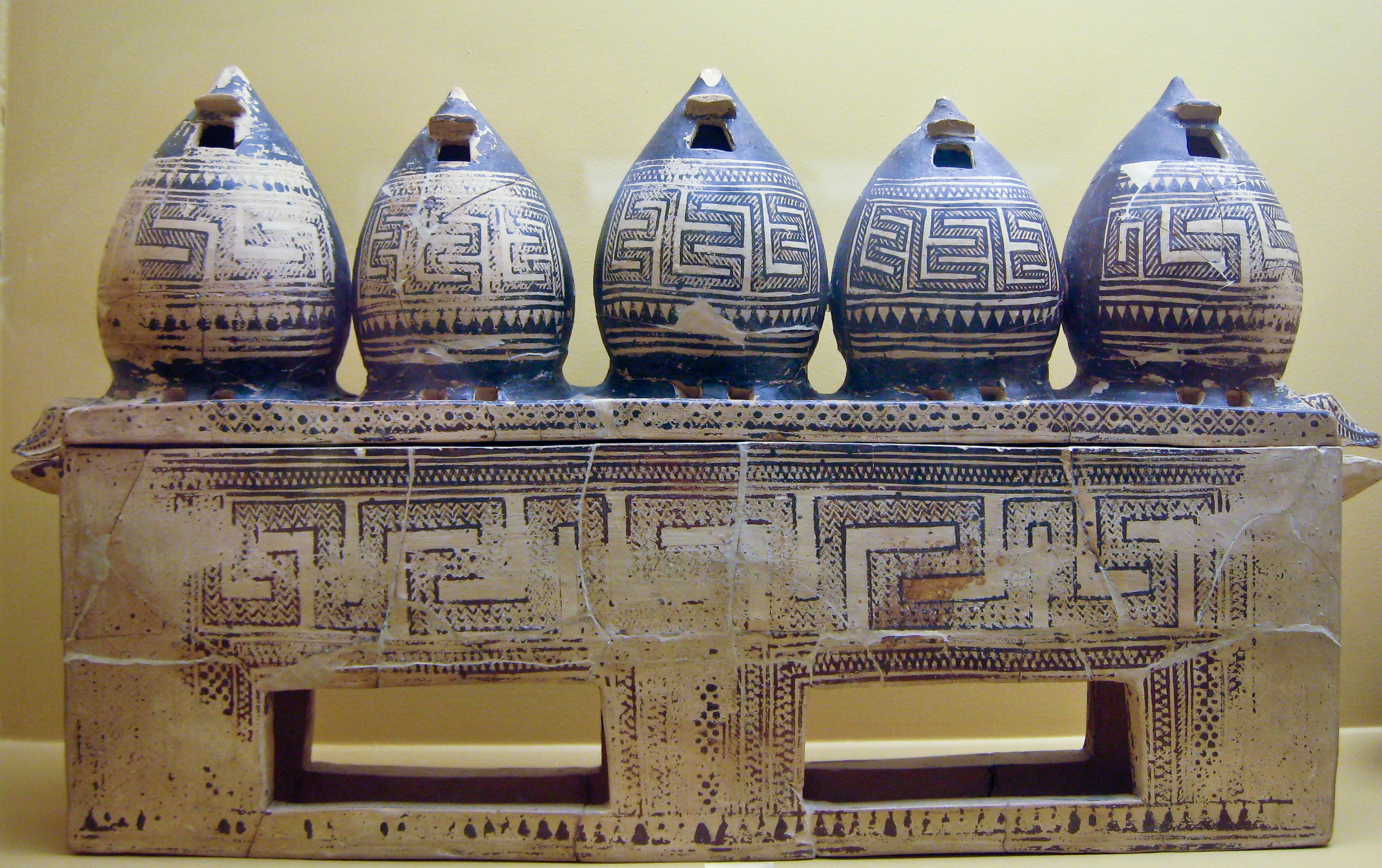
Ancient Greek geometric art funeral gift box in the shape of granaries, 850 BC. On display in the Ancient Agora Museum in Athens, housed in the Stoa of Attalos

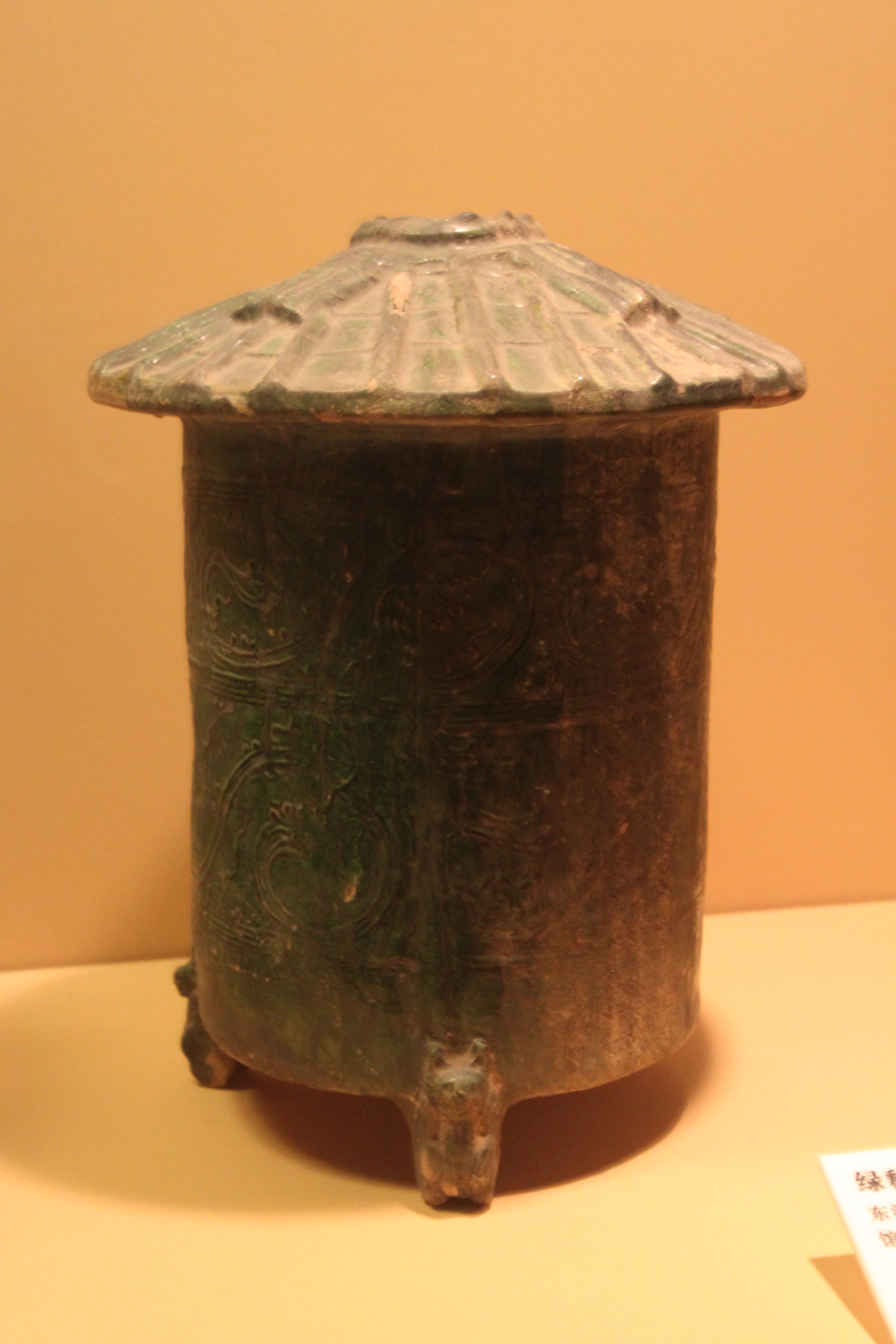
Granary model, Han dynasty. Stoneware model granary canisters as these were funeral gifts, buried with the deceased as a symbol of wealth and to provide food in the afterlife

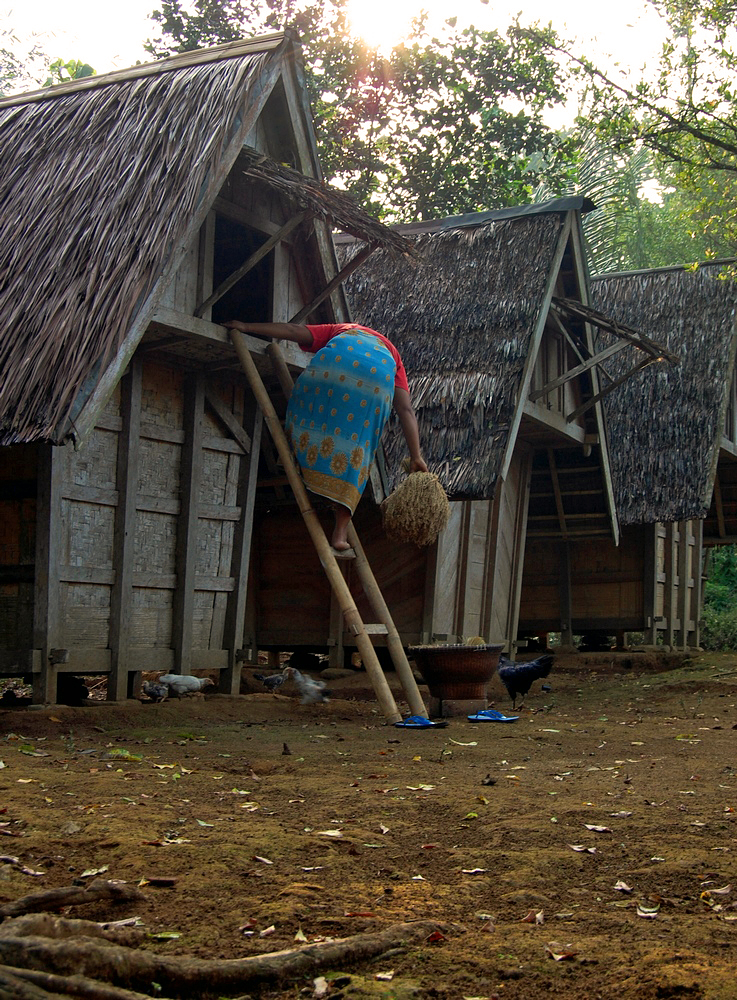
Leuit, Sundanese traditional granary, in West Java, Indonesia

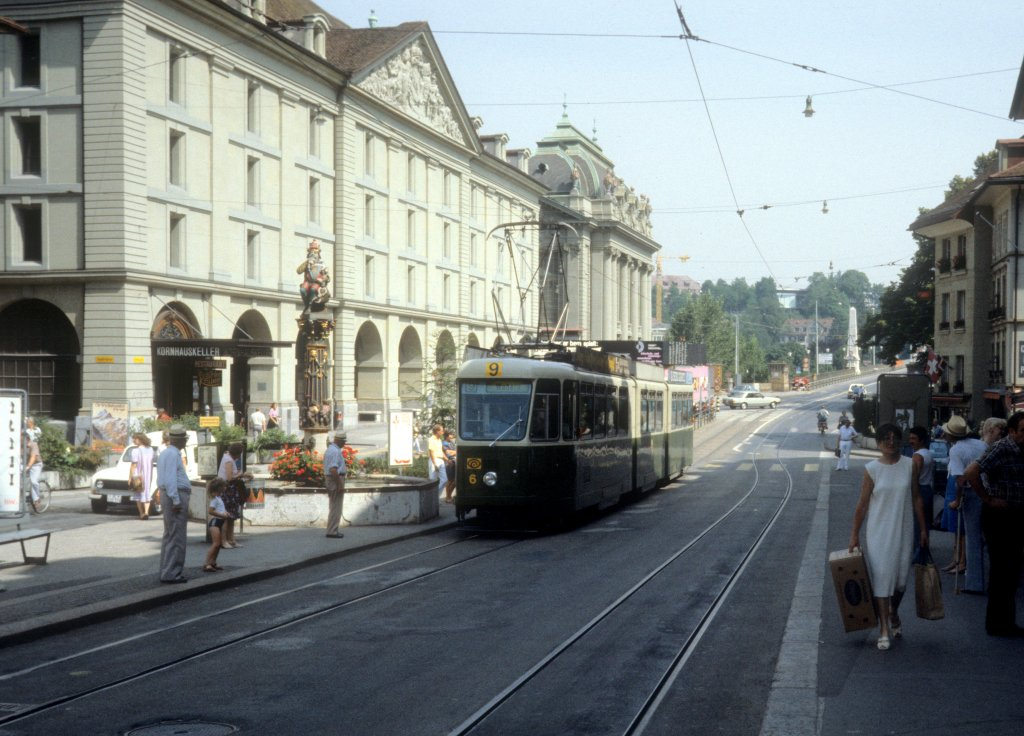
The Grain House (Kornhaus), building on the left, next to tram 9, located on Kornahusplatz in Bern, was a granary built between 1711 and 1715 (photo from 1983)

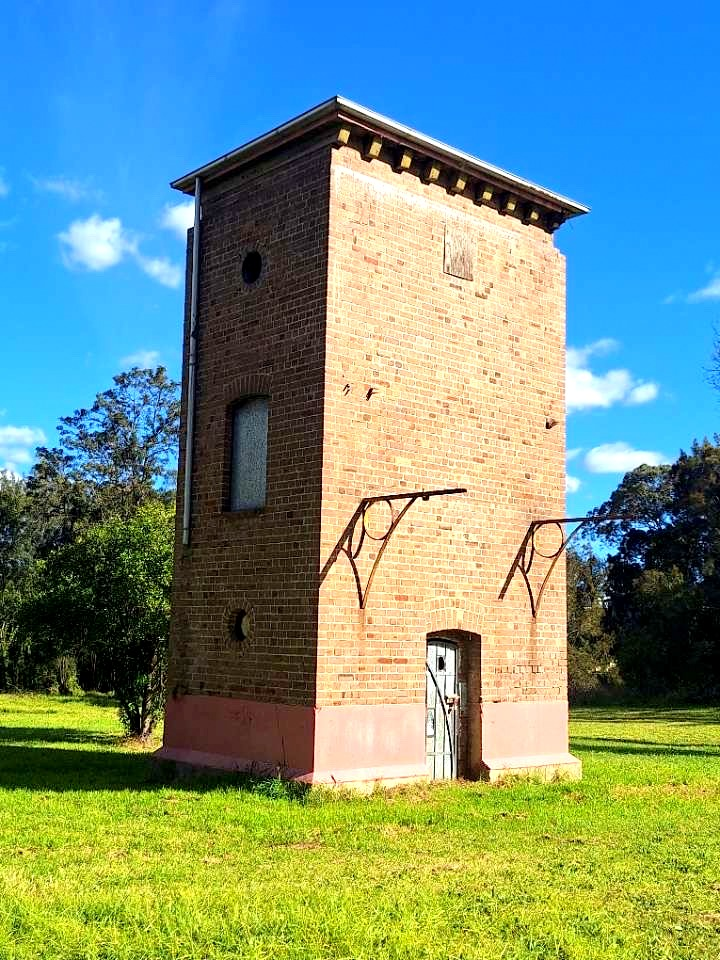
A grain brick tower built by German Australian Carl Wilhlem Gunther von Heiden in the 1900s, in Sydney, Australia

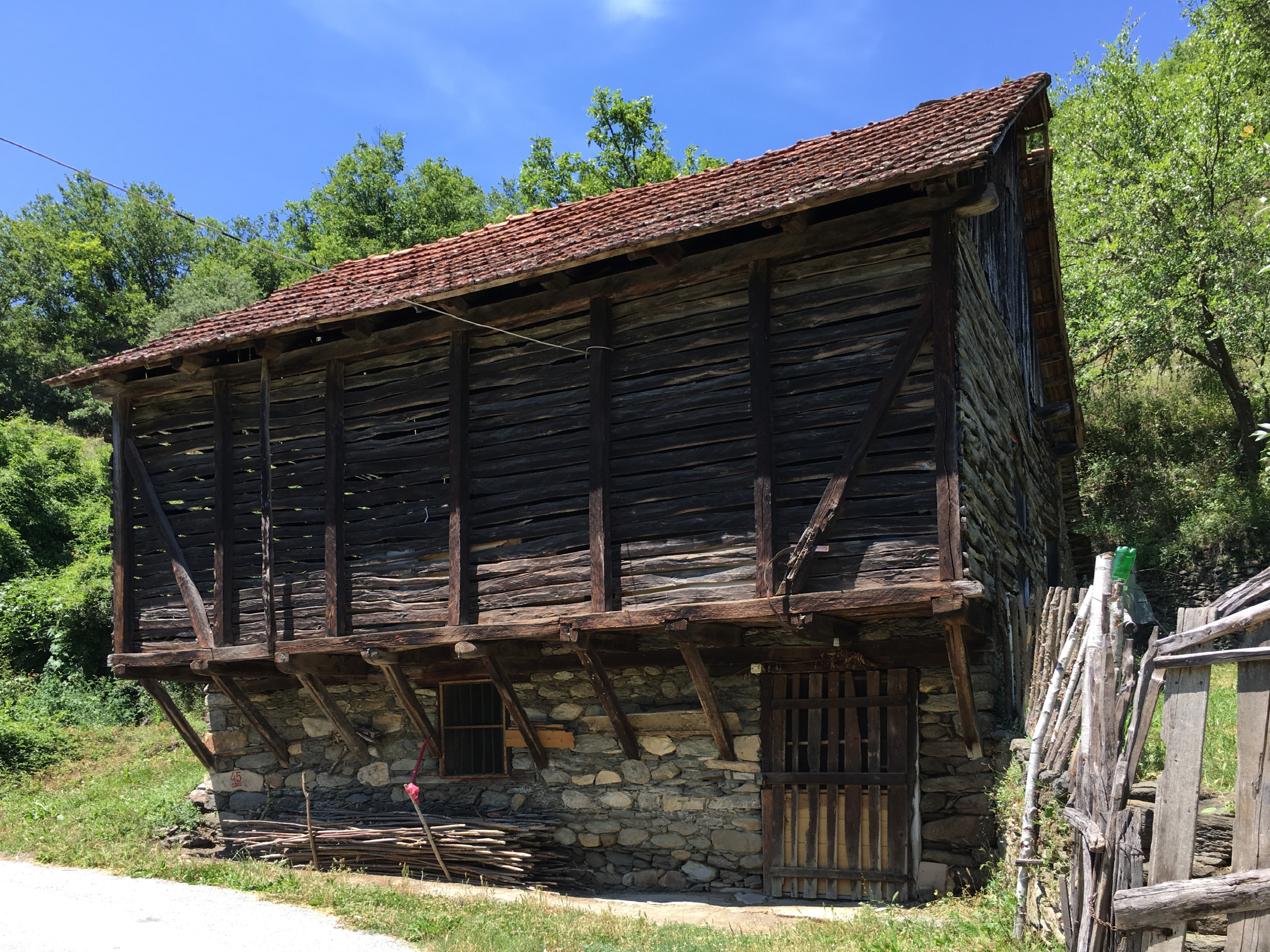
A wooden granary in the village of Topolnica, North Macedonia

== See also ==
- Hambar
- Hórreo
- Horreum
- Raccard
- Storage silo
- Corn crib
- Groote Schuur, the stately South African home was originally a granary.
- Rice barn
- Treppenspeicher
- Ghorfa
- Parish granary
