= Functionally classified barn =

Barn as categorized by its use

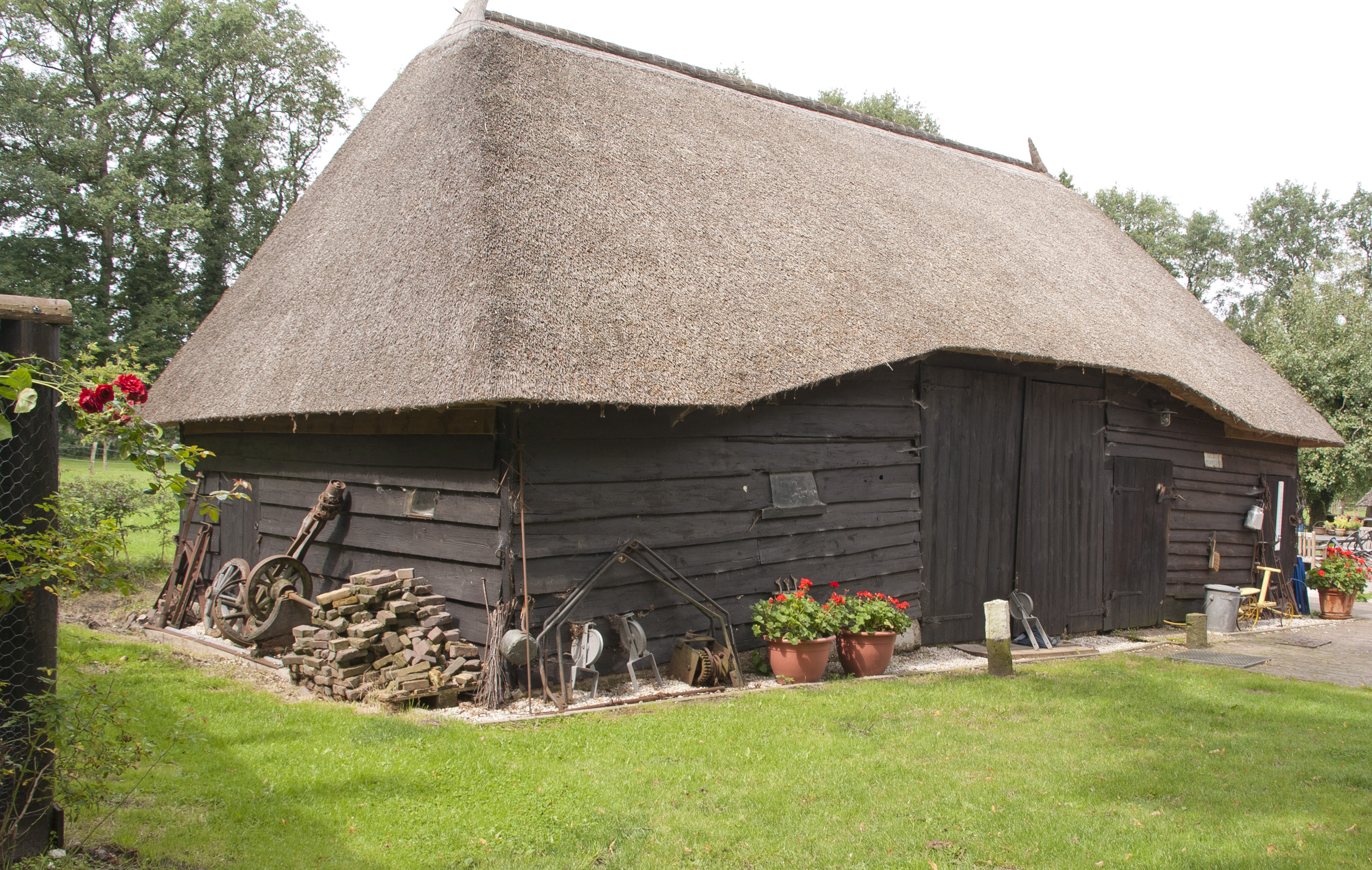
Wooden cattle barn (early 20th century) in Nunspeet, Netherlands

A functionally classified barn is a barn whose style is best classified by its function. Barns that do not fall into one of the broader categories of barn styles, such as English barns or crib barns, can best be classified by some combination of two factors, region and usage. Examples of barns classified by function occur worldwide and include apple barn, rice barn, potato barn, hop barn, tobacco barn, cattle barn (pole barn), and the tractor barn. In addition, some barns incorporate their region into their style classification. Examples include the Wisconsin dairy barn, Pennsylvania bank barn, or the Midwest feeder barn.

== Classifications ==
=== Tobacco barns ===
Tobacco barns were once an essential ingredient in the process of air curing tobacco. In the 21st century they are fast disappearing from the American landscape in places where they were once ubiquitous. U.S. States, such as Maryland, have sponsored programs which discourage the cultivation of tobacco. In 2001 Maryland's state sponsored program offered cash payments as buyouts to tobacco farmers. A majority of the farmers took the buyout and hundreds of historic tobacco barns were rendered instantly obsolete. As tobacco barns disappear farmer have been forced to change their methods for curing the crop. In Kentucky, instead of curing tobacco attached to laths in vented tobacco barns as they once did, farmers are increasingly curing tobacco on "scaffolds" in the fields.

==== Design ====
Design elements which were common to American tobacco barns include: gabled roofs, frame construction, and some system of ventilation. The venting can appear in different incarnations but commonly hinges would be attached to some of the cladding boards, so that they could be opened. Often the venting system would be more elaborate, including a roof ventilation system. The interior would have its framing set up in bents about ten to fifteen feet apart so that laths with tobacco attached to them could be hung for drying. There is no one design that typifies tobacco barns but they share some common elements not seen in other barns. However, tobacco barns do cross over into other barn styles of their day. Some common types of barn designs integrated into tobacco barns include, English barns and bank barns.

=== Hop barns ===
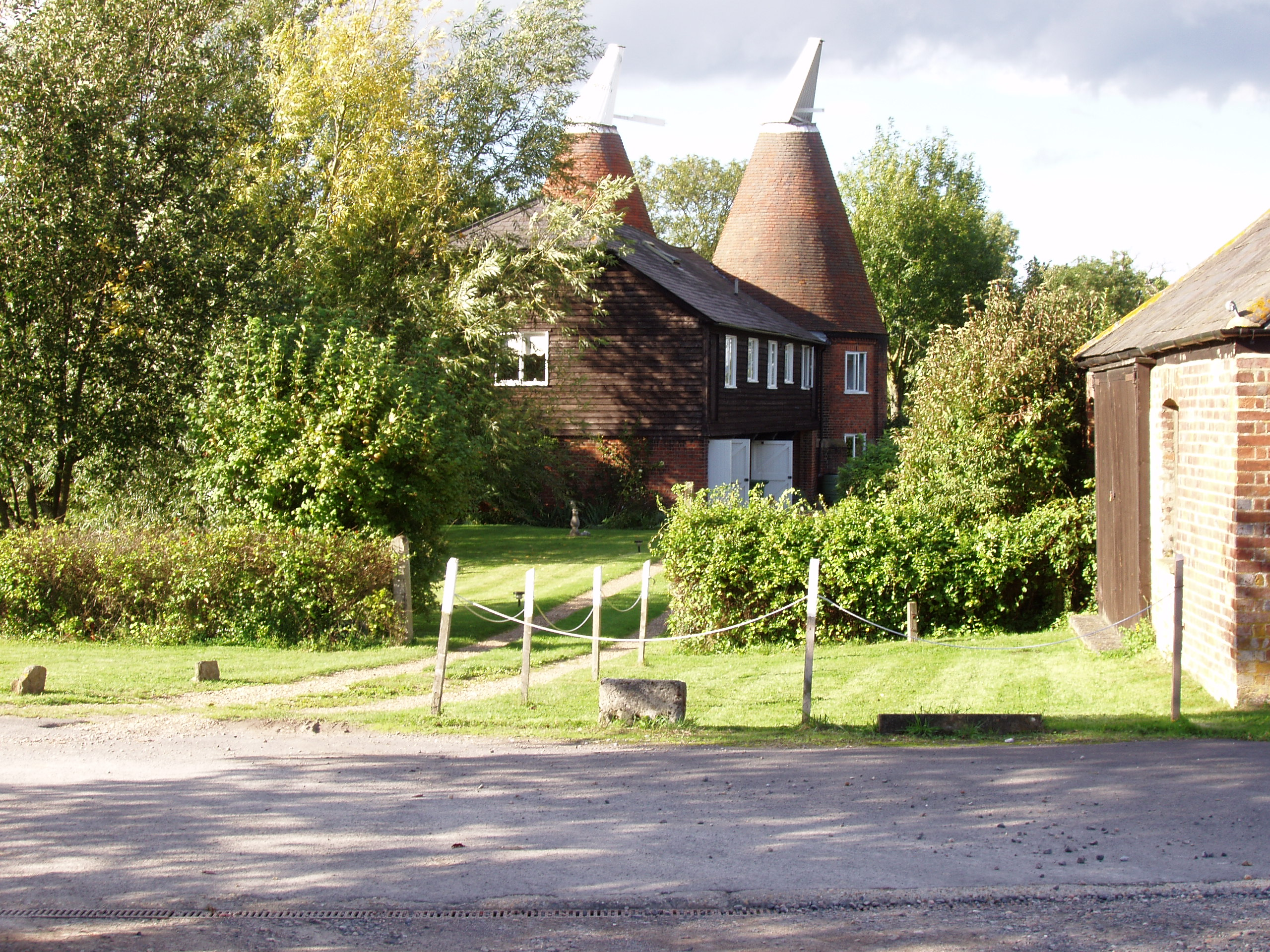
An Oast house, a conical, pyramid hop house in Kent.

Also known as hop houses or hop kilns, hop barns were very common in areas of the United States where hops were grown. Hop barns were so common it was said that "every other farm" had one. In New York state's "hop belt" numerous hop barns were constructed between the early 19th century and the beginning of the 20th century. Ostego, Chenango, Madison, Oneida, Montgomery and Schoharie Counties were the primary areas contained within the hop belt. As hops production basically dwindled down to only Washington state, in the U.S., the remaining hop houses elsewhere have begun to disappear. Defunct hop kilns are found in areas where hops production is still ongoing, in Kent, England, for instance.

==== Design ====
The design of hop houses changed significantly over time, as did the area hops were grown in. In New York, for instance, early hop barns were low with some ventilation. Later hop barns evolved into taller, more narrow buildings, often topped with a cupola over the drying kiln area. Later in the history of New York hops production, with farmers focused on more efficient means of production, pyramid shaped barns were built, eventually evolving into multi-pyramid hop barns.

=== Potato barns and houses ===
Barns designed to store potatoes are semi-subterranean (partially below ground) to naturally moderate the indoor temperature like a giant root cellar. The potatoes in storage could not be allowed to freeze or get too warm. Potatoes were not mass-produced until the end of the 19th century and so most old potato barns are 20th-century buildings with concrete walls.

Buildings to store sweet potatoes are sometimes called a potato house.

=== Pole barns ===
A pole barn in North America is a barn that is essentially a roof extended over a series of poles. They are generally rectangular and do not require exterior walls. The roof is supported by the poles, which make up the perimeter of the barn. Walls may be added to pole barns but are not required for structural integrity. The roof can be gabled or hooped. Pole barns are often used for hay storage or livestock shelter, and larger structures are also used for indoor horse stables and riding arenas. This type of barn is not only very common in modern agriculture but is also used for other applications where large spaces are needed, including boat and truck storage, warehouses, strip malls, retail stores, public exhibit buildings at a fairgrounds, and related uses. Residential garages are also built as pole barns because of their quick construction time and efficient use of materials.

The advantages of pole barns include their low cost and their ability to store large quantities of hay or other materials in areas easily accessible by vehicles, machines, and people.

In the United Kingdom a pole barn refers to a type of Dutch barn.

==== Design ====
The design of most pole barns is simple. Poles make up the outer walls and support the roof system, usually pre-engineered wood trusses with a roof sheathing. Poles are usually spaced 8' apart, with the trusses bearing directly on the poles. Some variations in design call for truss carrying beams between the posts with trusses sitting on them. The exterior walls consist of girts attached horizontally to the post with the exterior sheathing attached to them. Exterior walls may be finished with corrugated metal, plywood sheathing, vinyl siding, or other cladding. Roof materials are generally corrugated metal but may be finished using any typical roofing product.

Depending on the function of the barn, there can be slight differences in style. For instance, a barn used for storing hay may lack any kind of lower exterior wall, whereas a pole barn used to house livestock would have some form of wall meeting the roof.

==== History of Pole Barns ====
In the 1930s, post-frame construction had its start with the development of two key components: availability in rural areas of wood telephone and electricity poles, and corrugated steel sheeting. By using poles embedded in the ground, along with steel roofing and siding, the amount of framing, siding, and foundation material needed to construct a barn was drastically reduced. The columns were literally telephone poles – hence the term 'pole barn'. After World War 2, 'poles' were replaced by solid sawn posts, usually 4×6 or 6×6. The posts were chemically treated to resist decay, greatly increasing the useful life of a building. In the 1950s and 1960s, metal-plate-connected wood trusses were developed, increasing roof spans, eventually up to 100′ (30 m). In the 1970s and 1980s, solid sawn posts were supplemented by laminated 2×6 and 2×8 posts, allowing taller buildings. Since the 1980s, pole barns have been adapted for a variety of uses, including residential garages, retail stores, light commercial buildings, and professional offices. Corrugated metal is still very common, but other exteriors such as vinyl siding, stucco, and cement board are also used.

The National Frame Builders Association is a trade group for the post-frame construction industry.

=== Rice barns ===
Rice barns are used ubiquitously in the rice cultivating world for the storage and drying of harvested rice. They are prevalent in many Southeast Asian nations, Laos, Cambodia, Thailand and Indonesia among them. In North America rice barns were especially common in the U.S. state of South Carolina.

==== Design ====
Rice barn design varies greatly from region to region and, especially, nation to nation. South Carolinian rice barns were often clad in cypress shingles. In Asia a common barn design is a four pole, open-walled building; a structure that does not resemble the classical image of a barn in any way.

== Significance ==
=== United States ===
Barn design, overall, bears architectural, cultural and historical significance, as well as some anthropological and sociological significance. Barn design speaks to two distinct parameters in agricultural history, one being climate and the other being occupation. Different types of barns tell much about what inhabitants of the past cultivated and in what type of climate they did it in. In the United States climate allows regional barn variation to easily be divided along a north/south axis. Design divided along these lines speaks to how farmers responded to the severity of the winter. In the north, where cold, harsh winters are common, buildings were more extensive and spacious, to house animals, crops and vehicles. South and west, in the U.S., where the weather tends to be more mild, barn design focused on smaller more specialized structures such as tobacco barns. It is regional differences in North American climate that produced the major differences in northern and southern American barns.

After climatology the biggest factor in barn design is function. All over the United States barn designs, such as those discussed above, were developed based upon the individual needs of specific crops or livestock.

== See also ==
- Oast house
- Gulf house
