= Rangkiang =

Type of rice silo in Indonesia

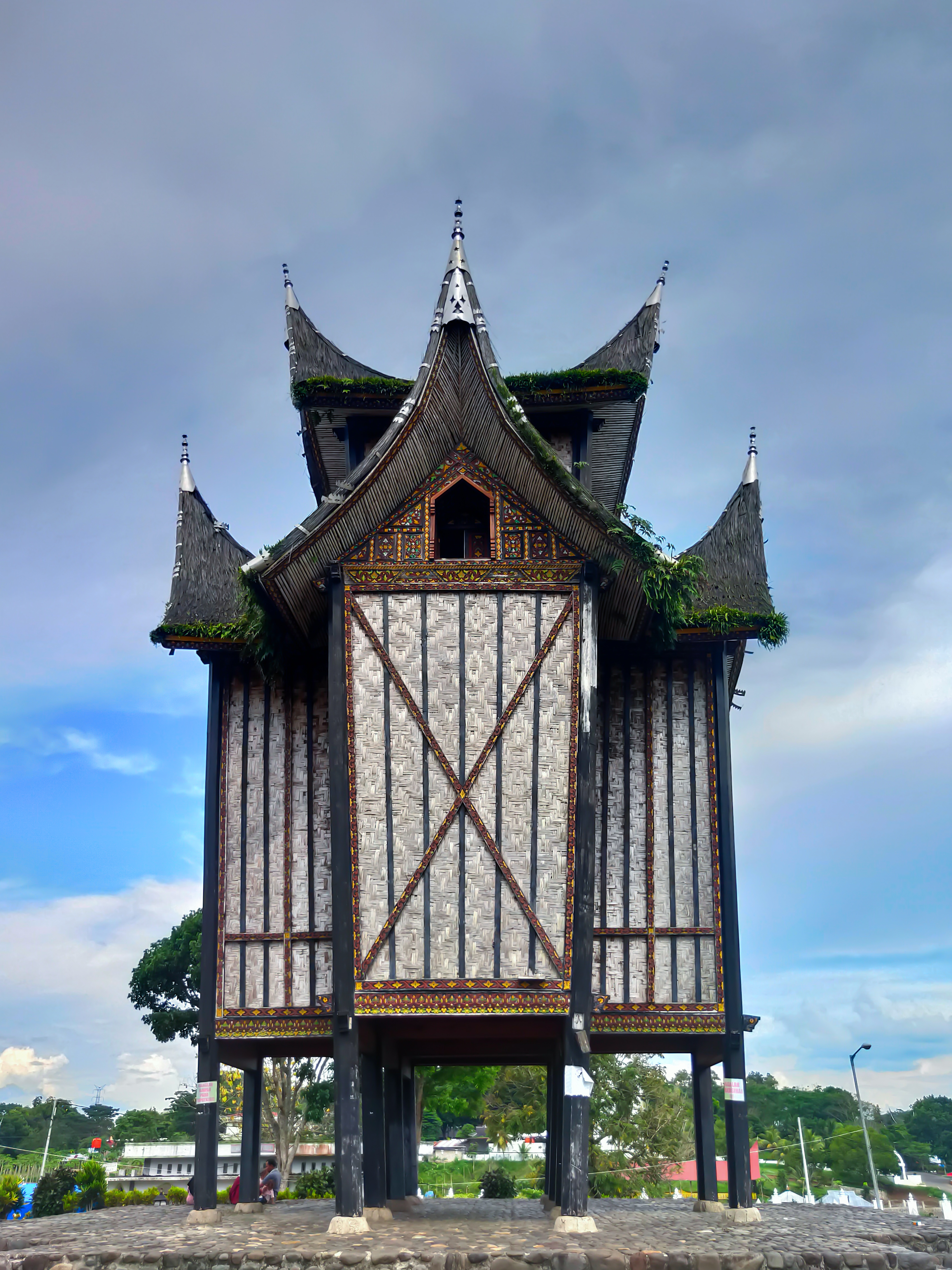
Rangkiang patah sembilan, the rangkiang of the Pagaruyung Palace

Rangkiang (also lumbuang) is a granary or rice barn that the Minangkabau people used to keep rice in. The rangkiang is a distinctive feature of Minangkabau architecture. The structure is traditionally found in the courtyard of a rumah gadang, the traditional house of Minangkabau people.

== Etymology ==
The word rangkiang is a shortened version from the Minangkabau word "ruang hyang (Dewi Sri)" ("room of goddess (Dewi Sri)"), the goddess of rice.

== Architecture ==
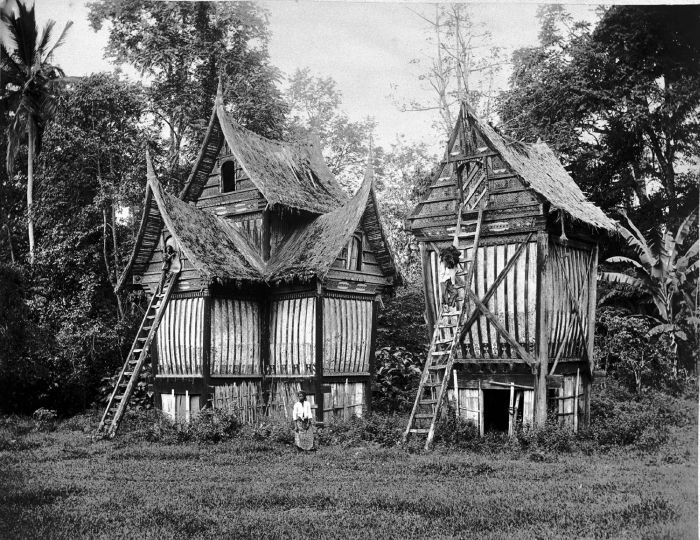
Two rangkiang in a photo circa 1895 of rice granaries in the Minangkabau architectural style in Batipuh in the Padang Plateau, Sumatra

A rangkiang is a structure built over a raised pile foundation, an Austronesian legacy that can be found anywhere else in Indonesia. It has a distinguished roof shape known as gonjong ("spired") roofs, similar to a Minangkabau traditional house, the rumah gadang. The gonjong roof symbolically identifies it with buffalo horns. Similar to the rumah gadang, the roof of a rangkiang is traditionally a thatched roof made of palm fibre (ijuk), and it is also similarly decorated. The only opening to a rangkiang is a small rectangular hatch high up in the gable end, into which the harvested rice is placed. A ladder is required to reach this hatch.

A rangkiang is traditionally built on the courtyard of a rumah gadang. There are three types of rangkiangs according to its function. A rangkiang which is used to store rice that is to be consumed by the inhabitants of the house is known as si bayau-bayau. This rangkiang, the largest of all rangkiang, is traditionally supported by a minimum of six poles; in the case of a royal palace —such as the rangkiang of the Pagaruyung Palace— it can be supported by as many as twelve poles. This rangkiang is traditionally located at the right end of a rumah gadang's courtyard.

Another type of rangkiang is si tinjau lauik ("the one that explores the sea"). It is used to keep rice that is to be sold. The resulting money is used to buy things that the family cannot produce themselves. This rangkiang is traditionally located in the middle of a rumah gadang's courtyard. It is supported by four poles.

Another type of rangkiang is the si tanggung lapar or si tangguang lapa or si tangka lapa ("the one that supports hunger"), which is used to store surplus rice for use in times of scarcity. This type of rangkiang is traditionally positioned at the left end of a rumah gadang courtyard. It is basically identical to the si tinjau laut, being supported by four poles.

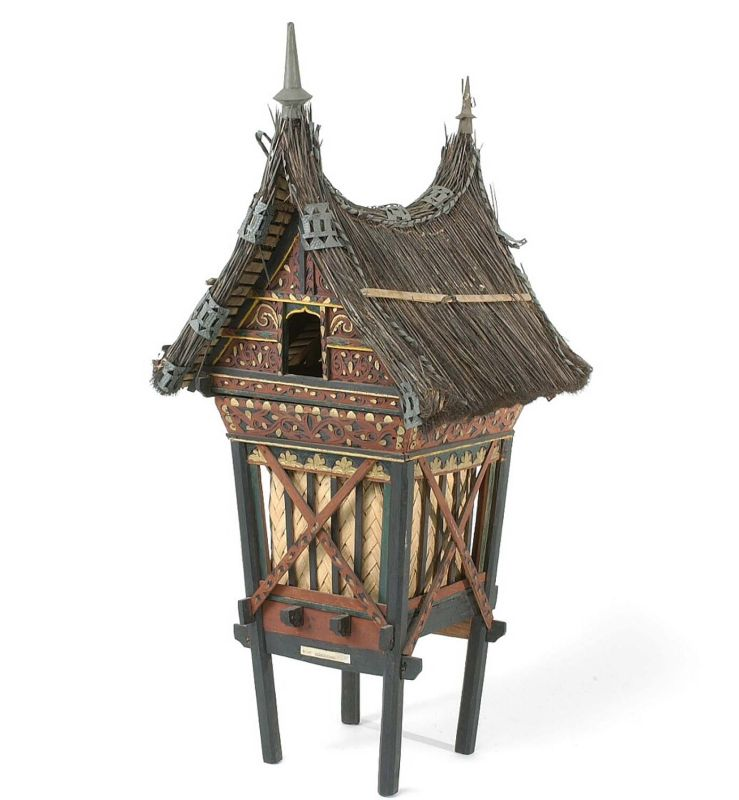
A model of a rangkiang

Other rangkiang, known as rangkiang kaciak ("little granary"), is used to keep rice seedlings (padi abuan) for agricultural purpose. This rangkiang used a simple gable roof instead of the elaborate Minangkabau roof form, thus it looks the simplest of all rangkiangs.

The number of rangkiang, as well as the degree of ornaments that decorates the rumah gadang, shows the wealth of the owner. The more rangkiang possessed by a family, the more prestigious the owner is.

== Modern use ==
A facade of a Minangkabau restaurant is sometimes decorated with a single gonjong roof which represents the roof of a rangkiang as a symbol of rice and food provision for people.

== See also ==
- Rice barn
- Leuit
- Rumah gadang

== Works cited ==
- Dr. Edwin (2006). Tanah komunal: memudarnya solidaritas sosial pada masyarakat matrilineal Minangkabau [Communal land: the disappearing social solidarity in the matrilineal society of Minangkabau] (in Indonesian). Andalas: Andalas University. ISBN 9789793364292.
- Franzia, Elda; Piliang, Yasraf Amir; Saidi, Acep Iwan (January 2015). "Rumah Gadang as a Symbolic Representation of Minangkabau Ethnic Identity". International Journal of Social Science and Humanity. 5 (1): 44–49.
- Tjahjono, Gunawan, ed. (1998). Architecture. Indonesian Heritage. Vol. 6. Singapore: Archipelago Press. ISBN 981-3018-30-5.
- Navis, A.A. (July 2001). Cerita Rakyat Dari Sumatera Barat 3 [West Sumatra Folk Stories 3] (in Indonesian). Contributed by the Proyek Inventarisasi dan Pembinaan Nilai-Nilai Budaya (Indonesia). Jakarta: Departemen Pendidikan dan Kebudayaan, Direktorat Jenderal Kebudayaan, Direktorat Sejarah dan Nilai Tradisional, Proyek Inventarisasi dan Pembinaan Nilai-Nilai Budaya. ISBN 9789797595517.
- Schefold, Reimar, ed. (2008). Indonesian Houses: Survey of Vernacular Architecture in Western Indonesia. Leiden series on Indonesian architecture. Vol. 2. Leiden: KITLV Press. ISBN 9789004253988.
- Syamsidar (1991). Arsitektur Tradisional Daerah Sumatera Barat [Traditional Architecture of West Sumatra Region] (in Indonesian). Padang: Grasindo. ISBN 9789797595517.
