= Leuit =

Vernacular rice barn in Sundanese architecture

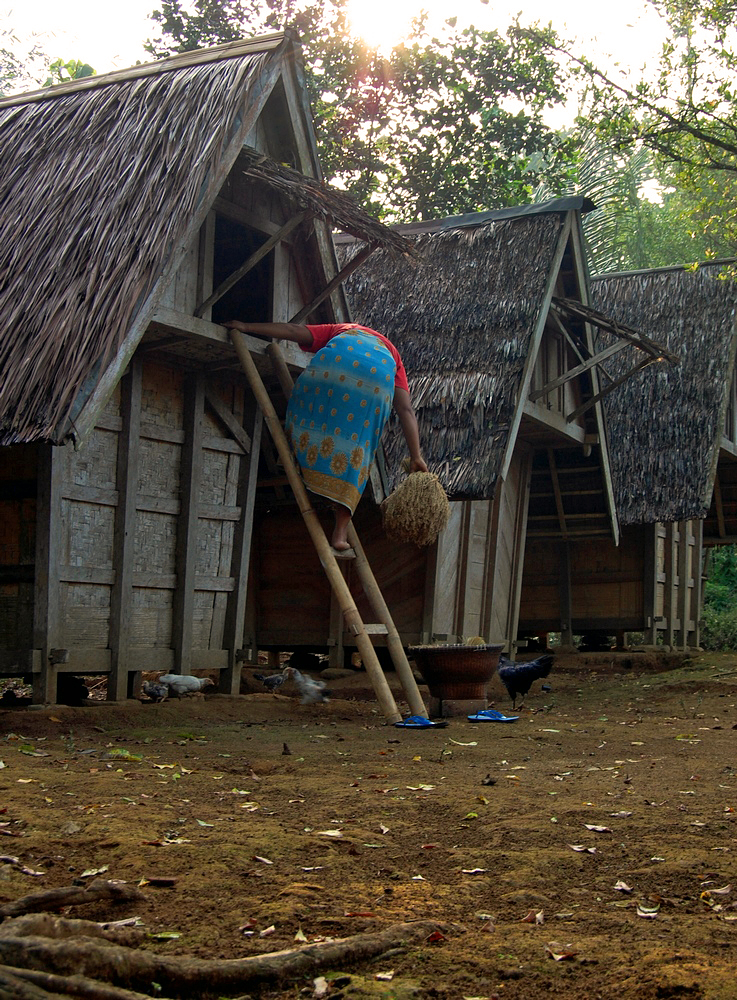
A woman retrieving rice from a leuit

Leuit is a type of vernacular rice barn found in the Sundanese architecture of Western Java, Indonesia. It used to store rice after harvest for future and daily use. A leuit is an essential part of Sundanese agricultural tradition, especially during annual Seren Taun harvest ceremony. In Sundanese tradition, leuit symbolizes sustenance and livelihood.

== History ==
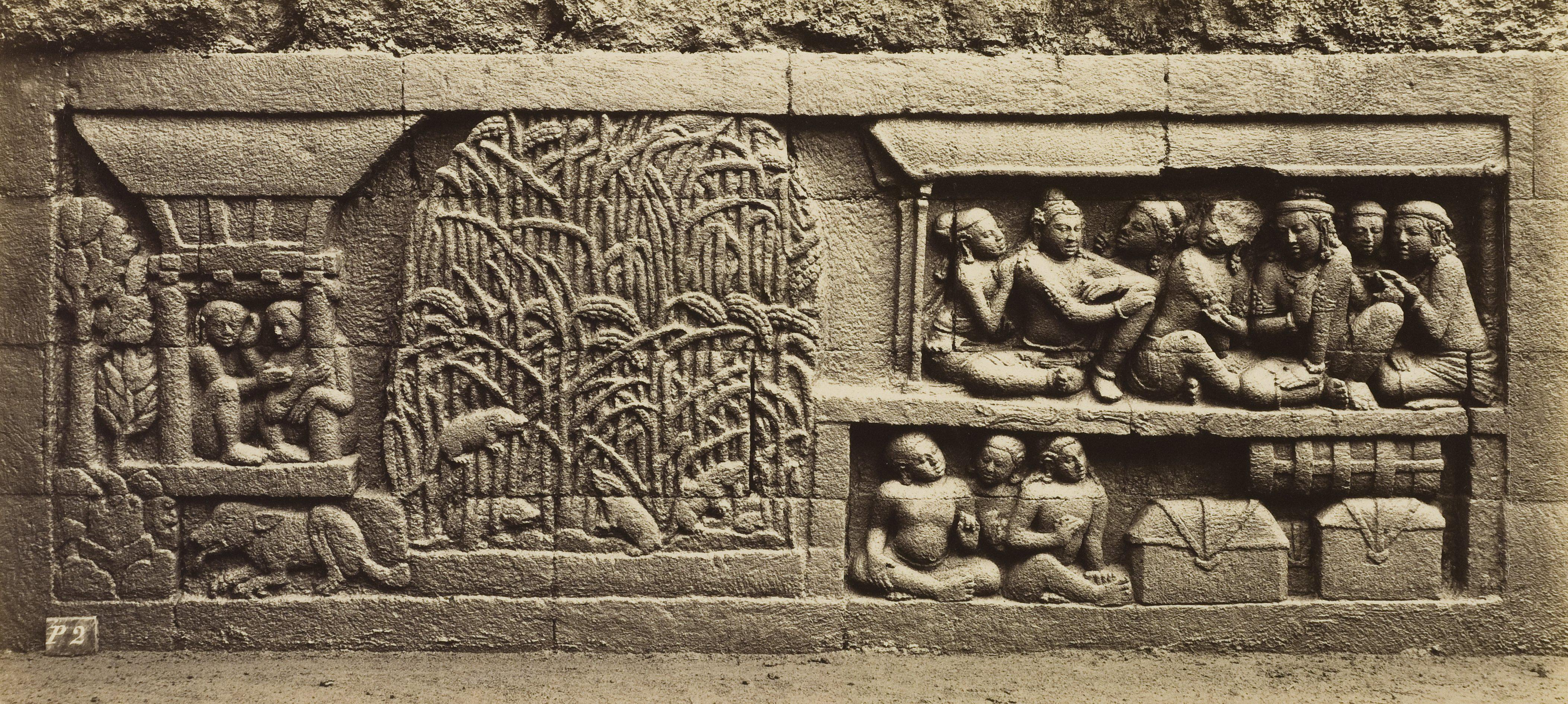
A bas-relief from hidden foot of Borobudur. The ancient Javanese rice barn (left) is remarkably similar to Sundanese leuit lenggang.

The stilted rice barn structure with its variations is common throughout Indonesian archipelago. It can be found in Minangkabau tradition as Rangkiang, also in Batak, Toraja, and Sasak traditions. A leuit, or similar structure of it, is believed as an ancient structure which was quite common in agricultural society of Java. A study of bas-relief from the hidden foot of the 9th-century Borobudur in Central Java revealed that the ancient Javanese rice barn is remarkably similar to the Sundanese leuit lenggang (long stilted rice barn), which demonstrate a continuous tradition of rice barn construction in the island.

== Form and materials ==
Leuit take basic form of triangular gable roofed structure, made of thatched materials (ijuk black aren fibers, hateup or kirai leaves, or palm leaves) covering wooden frames and beams, woven bamboo walls, and its structure is built on stilts either short or long. The leuit took form of rectangular structure with upper section is slightly wider than the lower section. The door of the rice barn is located on the upper section, and to reach it requires bamboo stairs.

Leuit with short stilts is called leuit tetepakan, usually has 8 or 10 short stilts, while the more ancient and rarely found leuit with four long stilts is called leuit lenggang. In leuit lenggang the gaps between the stilts pole and the leuit structure contains round logs that serves to block rats from rising into rice storage.

== Tradition ==
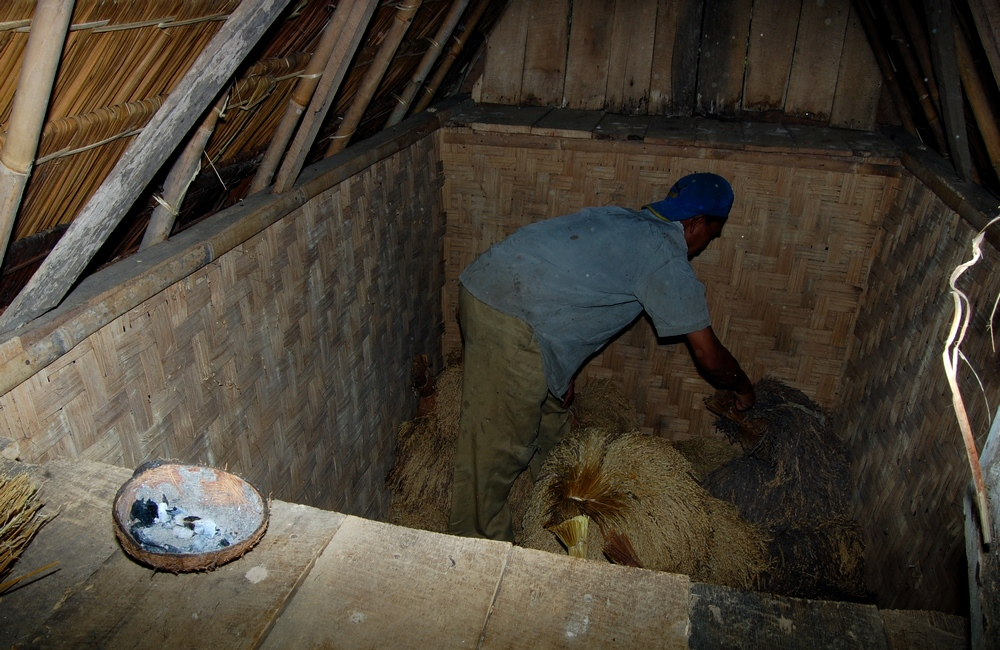
Inside of a leuit

The Seren Taun rituals marks the start of a new agricultural cycle, and are varied among each villages, however the main ritual is the procession to presenting the rice to community leader. The peak of this ritual is the Ngadiukeun ceremony, which involves storing rice hulls into the village's rice barn. The community leader later gave indung pare (mother of rice) that already blessed to the villages leaders to be planted in next agriculture cycle.

== See also ==
- Sundanese traditional house
- Rangkiang
