= Rice barn =

Barn for storing and drying harvested rice

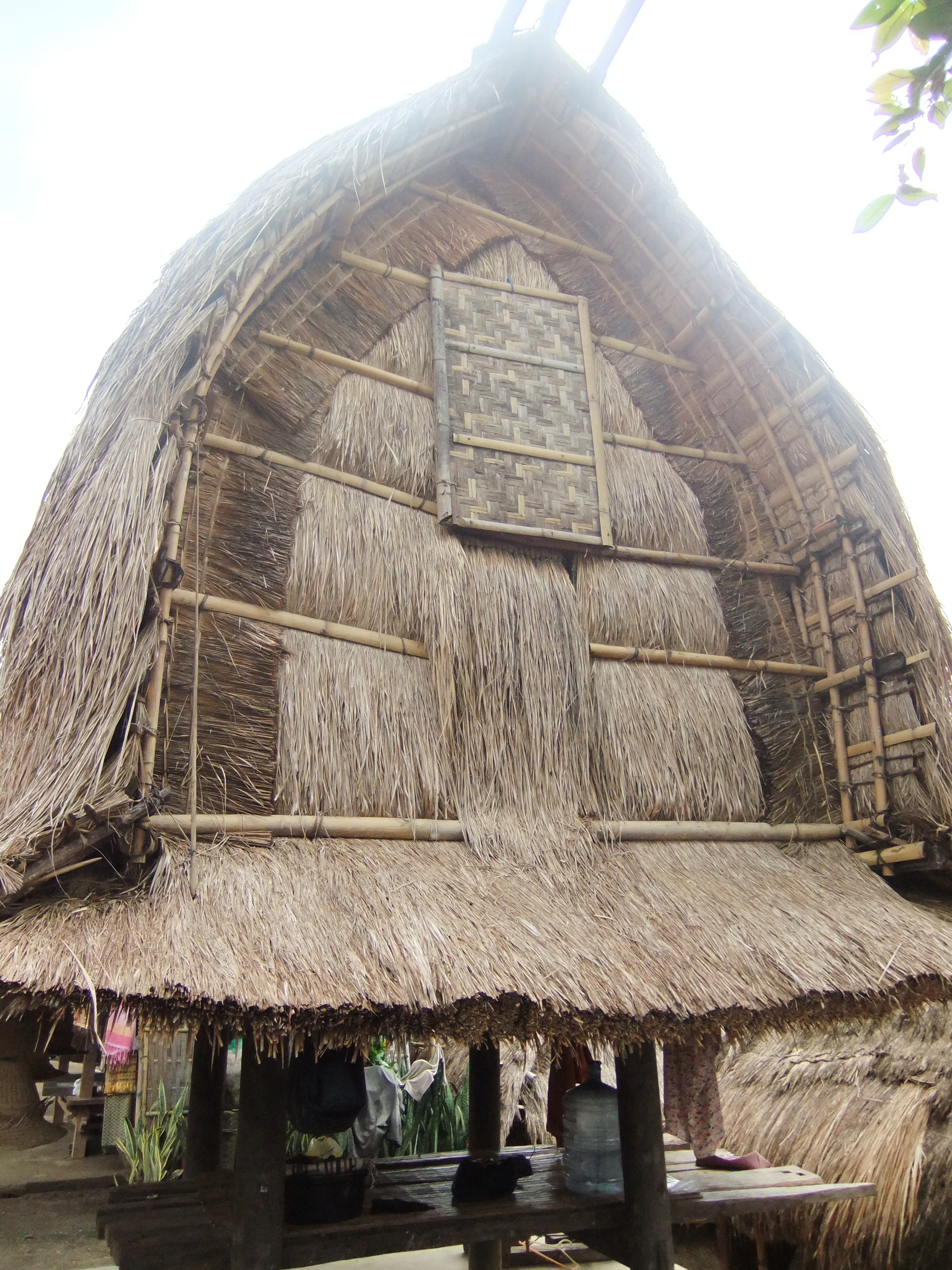
Lumbung, a rice barn of the Sasak people, Lombok, Indonesia

A rice barn is a type of barn used worldwide for the storage and drying of harvested rice. The barns' designs are usually specialized to their function, and as such may vary between countries or between provinces. Rice barns in Southeast Asia appear quite different from rice barns found in other parts of the rice cultivating world. In the United States rice barns were once common throughout the state of South Carolina.

== History ==
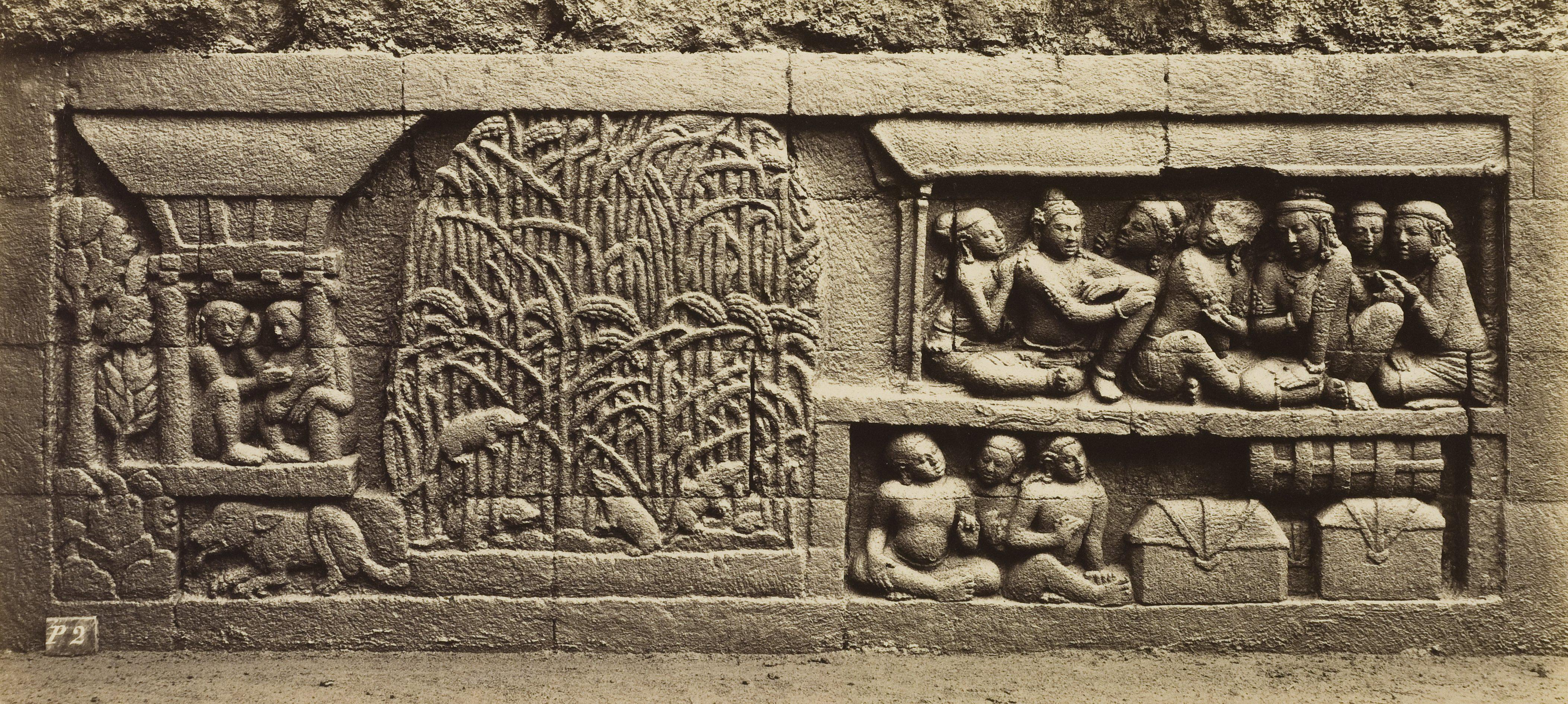
A bas-relief from hidden foot of Borobudur, describes the ancient Javanese stilted rice barn (left)

The rice barn structure, usually built on stilts with its variations, is common throughout Indonesian archipelago. It can be found in Minangkabau tradition as Rangkiang, also in Batak, Toraja, and Sasak traditions. A leuit, or similar structure of it, is believe as an ancient structure which was quite common in agricultural society of Java. A study of bas-relief from hidden foot of the 9th-century Borobudur in Central Java, revealed that the ancient Javanese rice barn is remarkably similar to present Sundanese leuit lenggang (long stilted rice barn), which demonstrate a continuous tradition of rice barn construction on the island.

== Rice barns in Southeast Asia ==
=== Indonesia ===
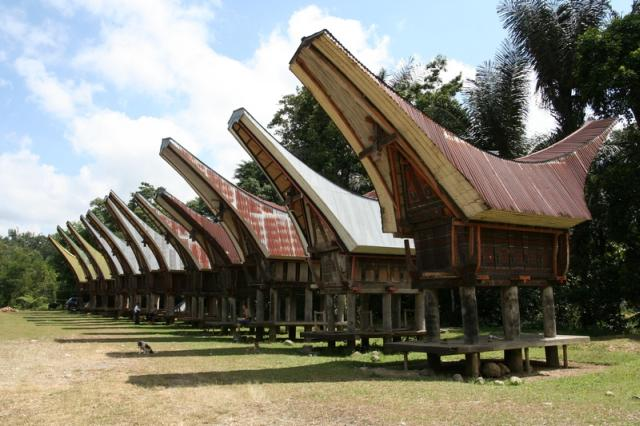
Tongkonan style rice barns of the Toraja peoples in Sulawesi, Indonesia

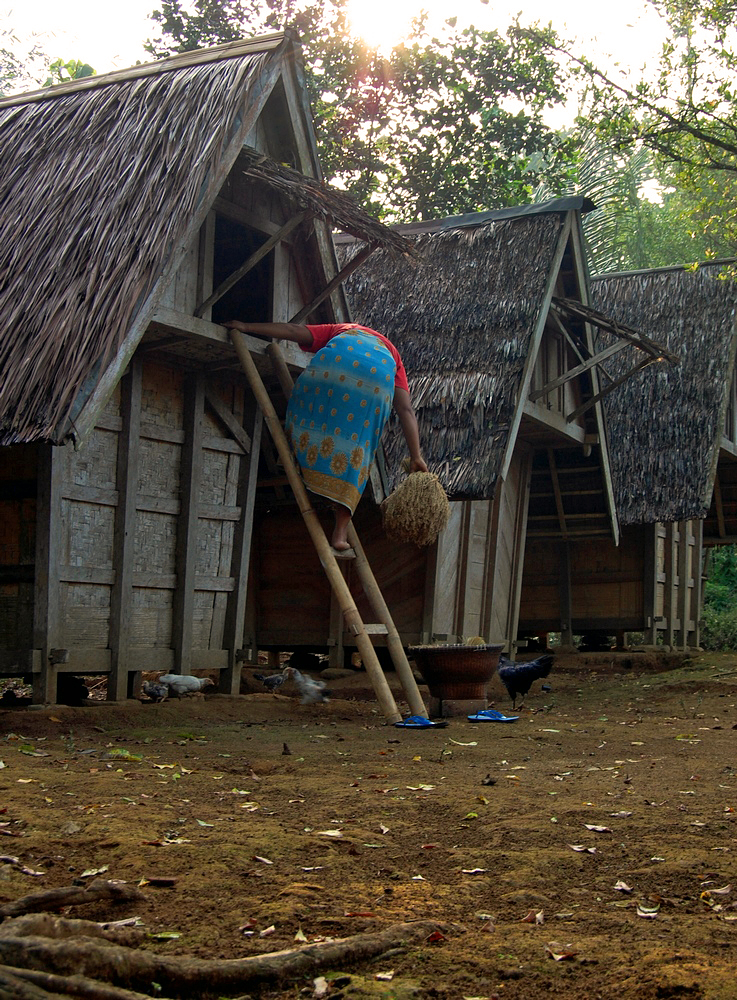
Sundanese leuit in West Java.

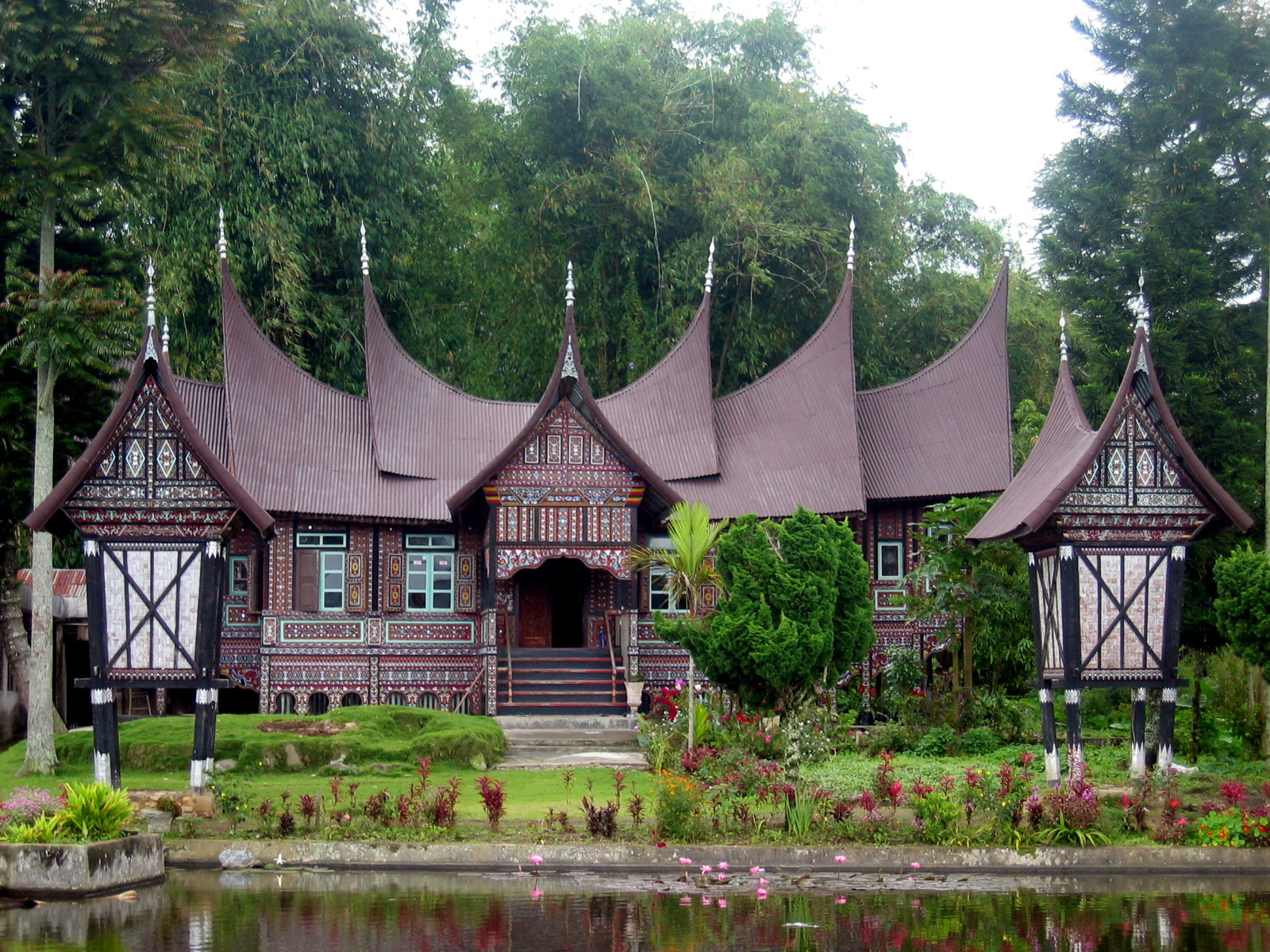
Two Minang rangkiang in front of Rumah Gadang, West Sumatra.

Rice barns in Indonesia (known as lumbungs) are built on four poles, usually stand between 1½ metre and 2 metres up from ground level. The upper storage area often has a distinct omega shape created by bending flexible framing of split bamboo or betel nut trees to support the roof. The roof is generally covered with alang-alang grass and the sides are made of woven, split bamboo (called pagar). The pole support structure beneath the raised, enclosed rice barn is open with no walls. A floor or platform is constructed of wood and bamboo about 1/2 metre above the ground. This lower platform provides a convenient, shady place for people to sit and relax. In many traditional villages this lower sitting area is a meeting place for village residents where both business activities and social interaction commonly occur.

In vernacular architecture of Indonesian archipelago rice barns are made of wood and bamboo materials, and roof usually made from dried grass, palm leaves, or ijuk (Arenga pinnata fibers), and most of them are built raised up on four or more posts to avoid rodents and insects. The styles could be differ according to each Indonesian ethnics architectural styles. The omega shaped curved roof is typical Sasak style of Lombok island. The distinct tongkonan style roof can be found on the rice barns of Torajan. Other examples include the Sundanese leuit and Minang rangkiang.

=== Laos ===
Rice barns in Laos commonly reflect the design of Laotian homes, though they are usually separate buildings from the home. The rice barn, built on wooden or bamboo piles, is usually located near the home or on the edge of the village.

=== Thailand ===
Thailand is a nation whose culture is very much intertwined with rice. Rice barns dot the landscape and the trend of barn conversion has spread to that nation as well. Other structures mimic the traditional rice barn through their architecture.

== Rice barns in North America ==
=== United States ===
Rice barns in the United States were most common in the state of South Carolina. Their design reflected their specialized use in rice cultivation.

==== Design ====
In South Carolina rice barns were typically rectangular in shape and of frame construction. The exterior walls were commonly covered with cypress shingles. Brick pier foundations support the structures, which usually climbed two stories high; gable roofs topped most of them off. The second floor could be accessed via an interior stairwell. Window and door placement would vary. Entrance doors, however, were often found at the end of one of the barn's long side walls and into the hay loft on the second floor.
