= River ecosystem =

Type of aquatic ecosystem with flowing freshwater

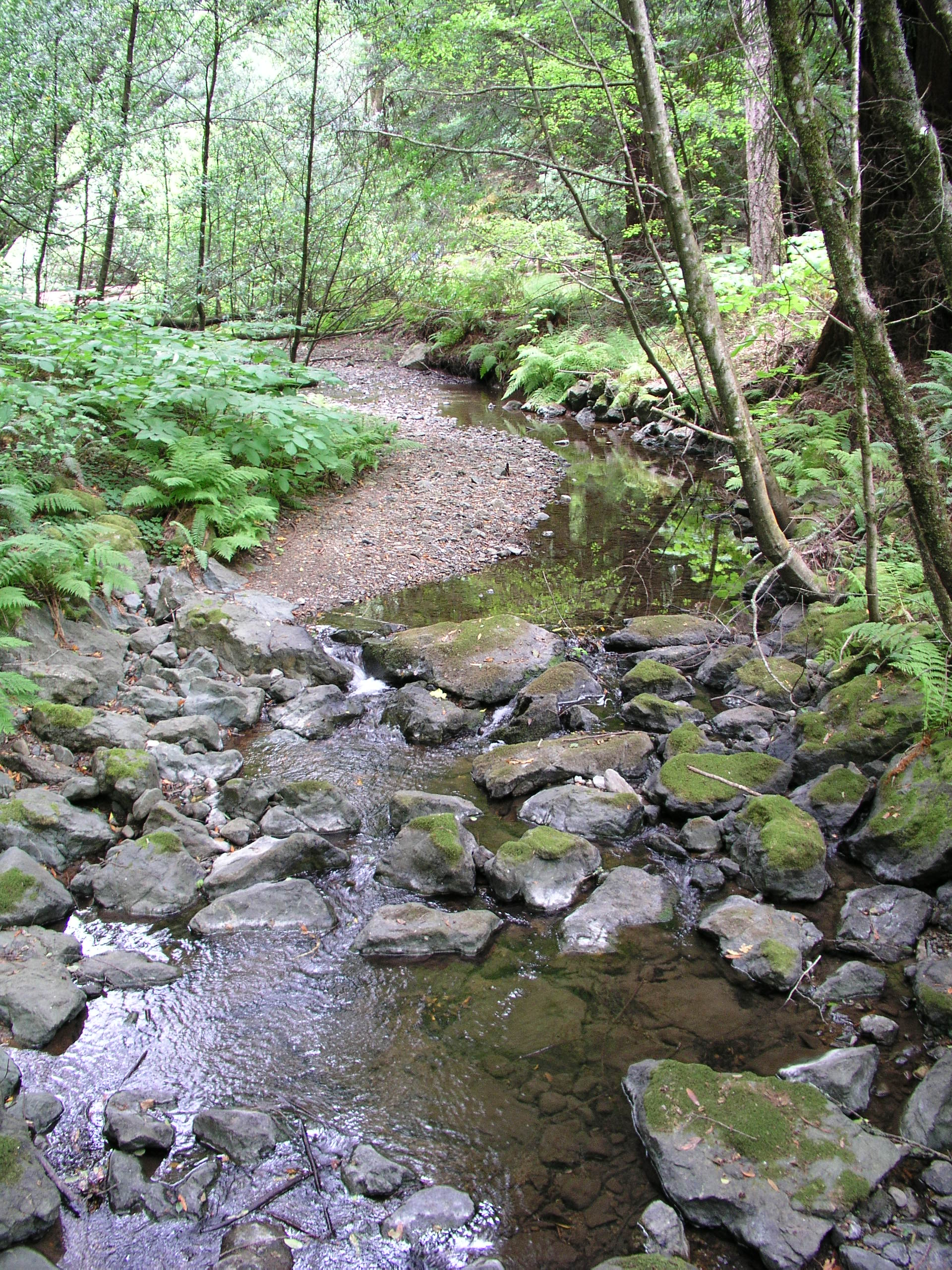
This stream operating together with its environment can be thought of as forming a river ecosystem.

River ecosystems are flowing waters that drain the landscape, and include the biotic (living) interactions amongst plants, animals and micro-organisms, as well as abiotic (nonliving) physical and chemical interactions of its many parts. River ecosystems are part of larger watershed networks or catchments, where smaller headwater streams drain into mid-size streams, which progressively drain into larger river networks. The major zones in river ecosystems are determined by the river bed's gradient or by the velocity of the current. Faster moving turbulent water typically contains greater concentrations of dissolved oxygen, which supports greater biodiversity than the slow-moving water of pools. These distinctions form the basis for the division of rivers into upland and lowland rivers.

The food base of streams within riparian forests is mostly derived from the trees, but wider streams and those that lack a canopy derive the majority of their food base from algae. Anadromous fish are also an important source of nutrients. Environmental threats to rivers include loss of water, dams, chemical pollution and introduced species. A dam produces negative effects that continue down the watershed. The most important negative effects are the reduction of spring flooding, which damages wetlands, and the retention of sediment, which leads to the loss of deltaic wetlands.

River ecosystems are prime examples of lotic ecosystems. Lotic refers to flowing water, from the Latin lotus, meaning washed. Lotic waters range from springs only a few centimeters wide to major rivers kilometers in width. Much of this article applies to lotic ecosystems in general, including related lotic systems such as streams and springs. Lotic ecosystems can be contrasted with lentic ecosystems, which involve relatively still terrestrial waters such as lakes, ponds, and wetlands. Lentic comes from the Latin lenis, meaning calm. Together, these two ecosystems form the more general study area of freshwater or aquatic ecology. There is no sharp boundary between the two systems, however.

The following unifying characteristics make the ecology of running waters unique among aquatic habitats: the flow is unidirectional, there is a state of continuous physical change, and there is a high degree of spatial and temporal heterogeneity at all scales (microhabitats), the variability between lotic systems is quite high and the biota is specialized to live with flow conditions.

== Abiotic components (non-living) ==
The non-living components of an ecosystem are called abiotic components. E.g. stone, air, soil, etc.

=== Water flow ===
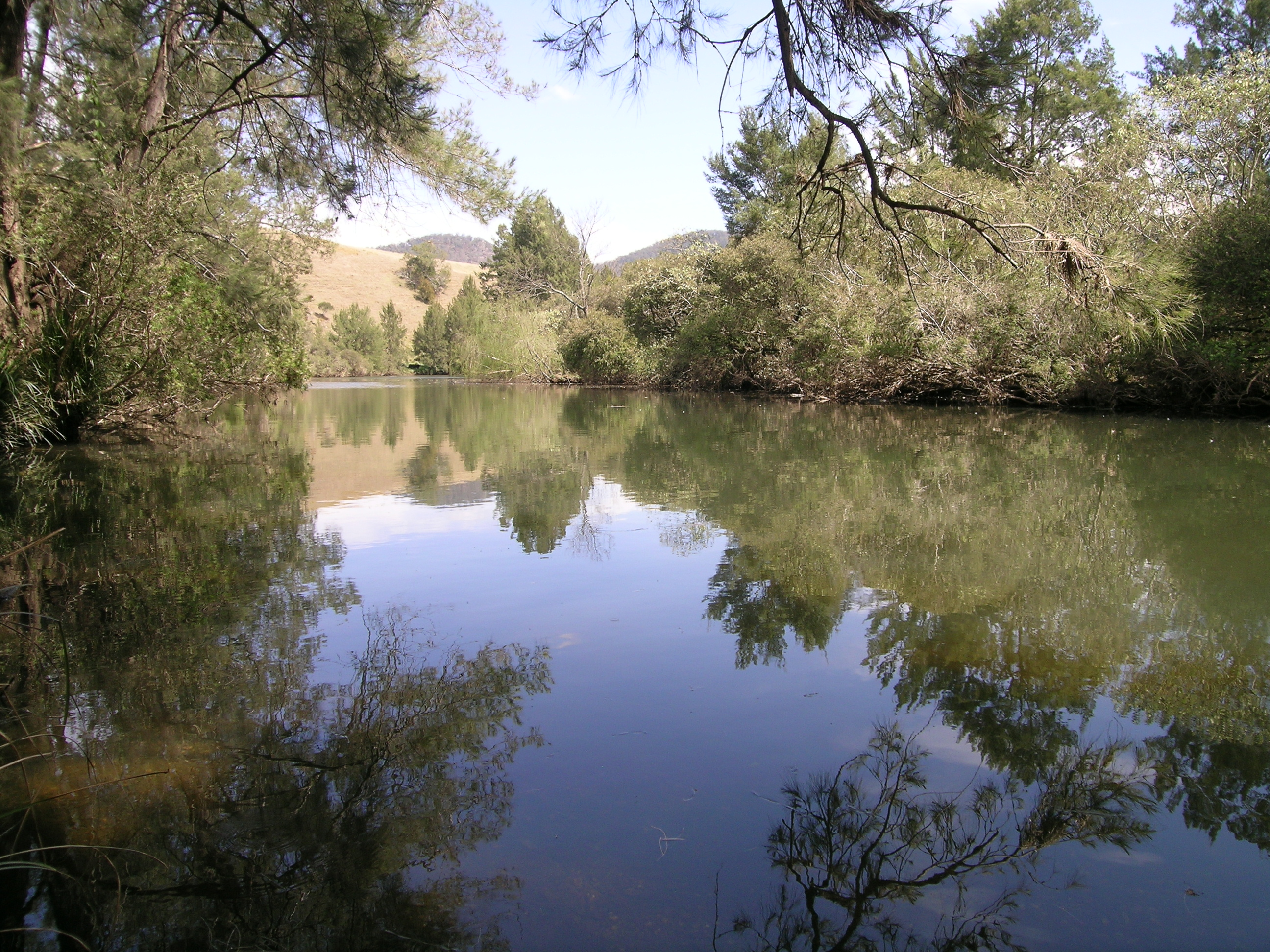
A pensive Cooplacurripa River, NSW

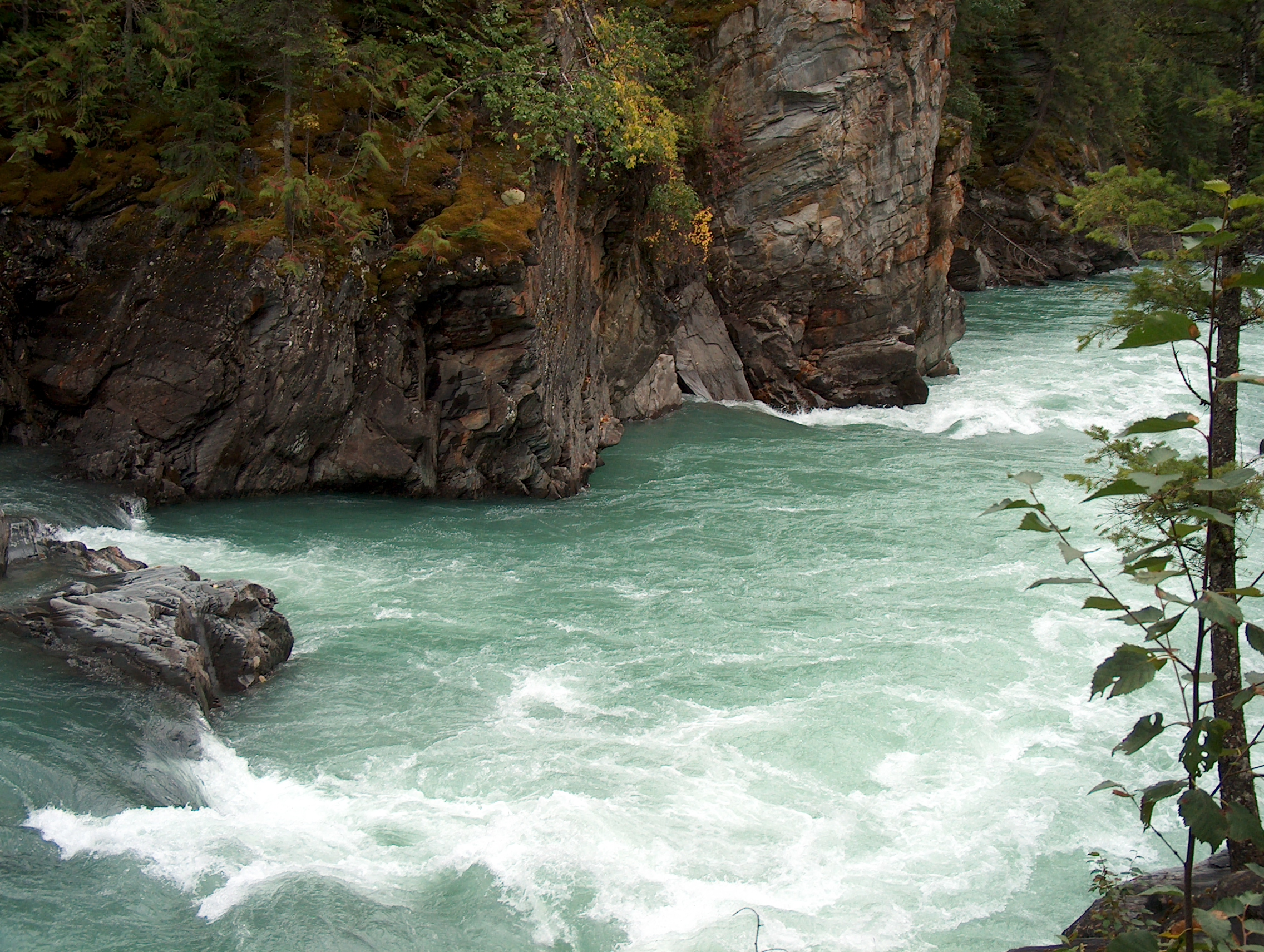
Rapids in Mount Robson Provincial Park

Unidirectional water flow is the key factor in lotic (riverine) systems influencing their ecology. Streamflow can be continuous or intermittent. Streamflow is the result of the summative inputs from groundwater, precipitation, and overland flow. Water flow can vary between systems, ranging from torrential rapids to slow backwaters that almost seem like lentic systems. The speed or velocity of the water flow of the water column can also vary within a system and is subject to chaotic turbulence, though water velocity tends to be highest in the middle part of the stream channel (known as the thalveg). This turbulence results in divergences of flow from the mean downslope flow vector as typified by eddy currents. The mean flow rate vector is based on the variability of friction with the bottom or sides of the channel, sinuosity, obstructions, and the incline gradient. In addition, the amount of water input into the system from direct precipitation, snowmelt, and/or groundwater can affect the flow rate. The amount of water in a stream is measured as discharge (volume per unit time). As water flows downstream, streams and rivers most often gain water volume, so at base flow (i.e., no storm input), smaller headwater streams have very low discharge, while larger rivers have much higher discharge. The "flow regime" of a river or stream includes the general patterns of discharge over annual or decadal time scales, and may capture seasonal changes in flow.

While water flow is strongly determined by slope, flowing waters can alter the general shape or direction of the stream bed, a characteristic also known as geomorphology. The profile of the river water column is made up of three primary actions: erosion, transport, and deposition. Rivers have been described as "the gutters down which run the ruins of continents". Rivers are continuously eroding, transporting, and depositing substrate, sediment, and organic material. The continuous movement of water and entrained material creates a variety of habitats, including riffles, glides, and pools.

=== Light ===
Light is important to lotic systems, because it provides the energy necessary to drive primary production via photosynthesis, and can also provide refuge for prey species in shadows it casts. The amount of light that a system receives can be related to a combination of internal and external stream variables. The area surrounding a small stream, for example, might be shaded by surrounding forests or by valley walls. Larger river systems tend to be wide so the influence of external variables is minimized, and the sun reaches the surface. These rivers also tend to be more turbulent, however, and particles in the water increasingly attenuate light as depth increases. Seasonal and diurnal factors might also play a role in light availability because the angle of incidence, the angle at which light strikes water can lead to light lost from reflection. Known as Beer's Law, the shallower the angle, the more light is reflected and the amount of solar radiation received declines logarithmically with depth. Additional influences on light availability include cloud cover, altitude, and geographic position.

=== Temperature ===
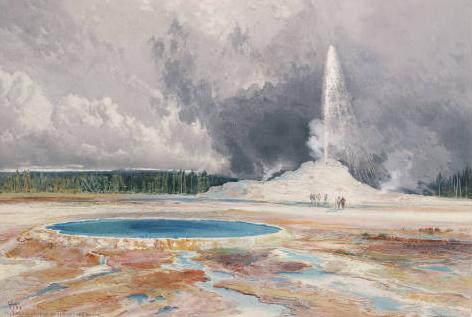
Castle Geyser, Yellowstone National Park

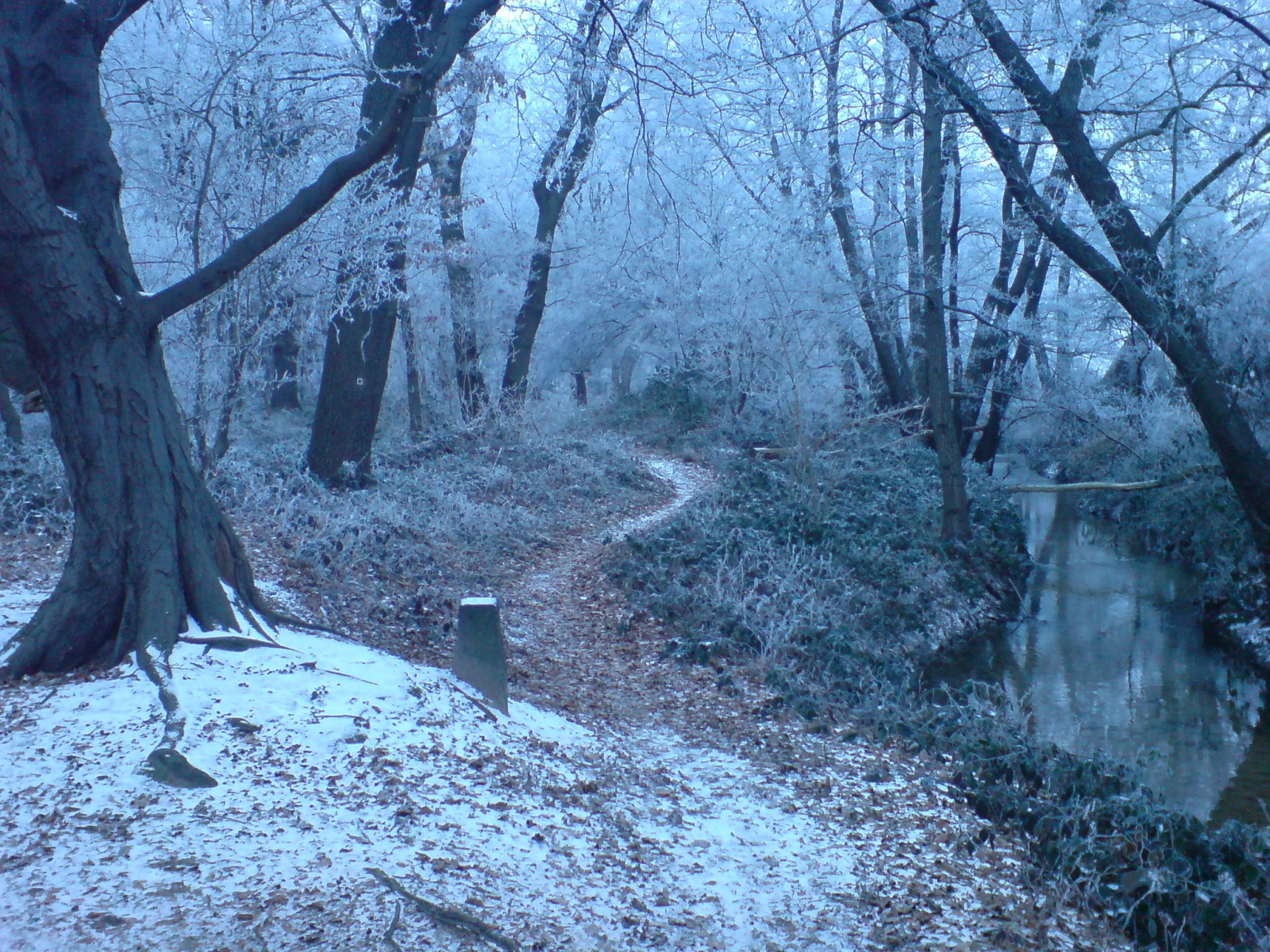
A forest stream in the winter near Erzhausen, Germany

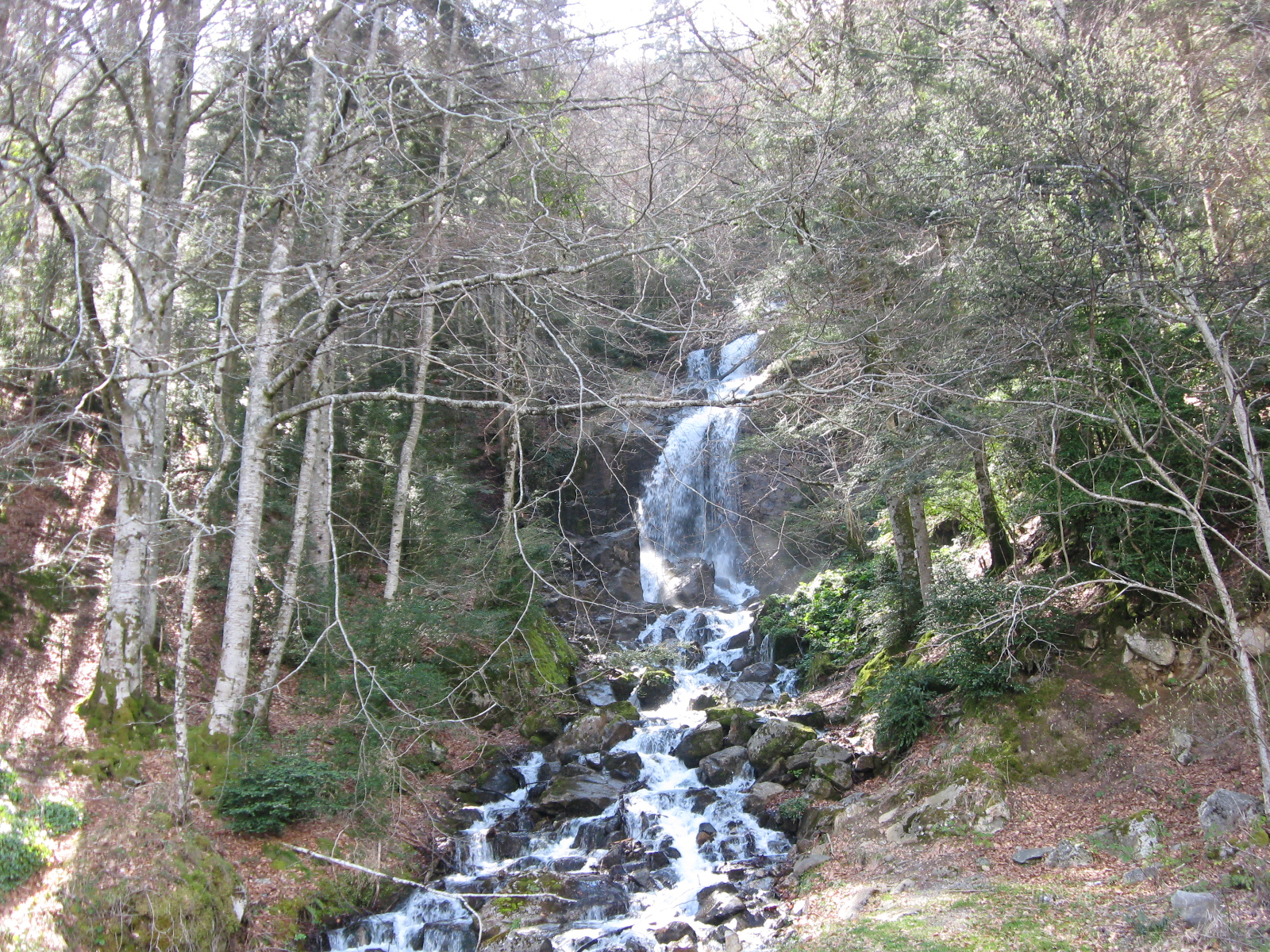
Cascade in the Pyrénées

Most lotic species are poikilotherms whose internal temperature varies with their environment, thus temperature is a key abiotic factor for them. Water can be heated or cooled through radiation at the surface and conduction to or from the air and surrounding substrate. Shallow streams are typically well mixed and maintain a relatively uniform temperature within an area. In deeper, slower moving water systems, however, a strong difference between the bottom and surface temperatures may develop. Spring fed systems have little variation as springs are typically from groundwater sources, which are often very close to ambient temperature. Many systems show strong diurnal fluctuations and seasonal variations are most extreme in arctic, desert and temperate systems. The amount of shading, climate and elevation can also influence the temperature of lotic systems.

=== Chemistry ===
Water chemistry in river ecosystems varies depending on which dissolved solutes and gases are present in the water column of the stream. Specifically river water can include, apart from the water itself,

- dissolved inorganic matter and major ions (calcium, sodium, magnesium, potassium, bicarbonate, sulphide, chloride)
- dissolved inorganic nutrients (nitrogen, phosphorus, silica)
- suspended and dissolved organic matter
- gases (nitrogen, nitrous oxide, carbon dioxide, oxygen)
- trace metals and pollutants

==== Dissolved ions and nutrients ====
Dissolved stream solutes can be considered either reactive or conservative. Reactive solutes are readily biologically assimilated by the autotrophic and heterotrophic biota of the stream; examples can include inorganic nitrogen species such as nitrate or ammonium, some forms of phosphorus (e.g., soluble reactive phosphorus), and silica. Other solutes can be considered conservative, which indicates that the solute is not taken up and used biologically; chloride is often considered a conservative solute. Conservative solutes are often used as hydrologic tracers for water movement and transport. Both reactive and conservative stream water chemistry is foremost determined by inputs from the geology of its watershed, or catchment area. Stream water chemistry can also be influenced by precipitation, and the addition of pollutants from human sources. Large differences in chemistry do not usually exist within small lotic systems due to a high rate of mixing. In larger river systems, however, the concentrations of most nutrients, dissolved salts, and pH decrease as distance increases from the river's source.

==== Dissolved gases ====
In terms of dissolved gases, oxygen is likely the most important chemical constituent of lotic systems, as all aerobic organisms require it for survival. It enters the water mostly via diffusion at the water-air interface. Oxygen's solubility in water decreases as water pH and temperature increases. Fast, turbulent streams expose more of the water's surface area to the air and tend to have low temperatures and thus more oxygen than slow, backwaters. Oxygen is a byproduct of photosynthesis, so systems with a high abundance of aquatic algae and plants may also have high concentrations of oxygen during the day. These levels can decrease significantly during the night when primary producers switch to respiration. Oxygen can be limiting if circulation between the surface and deeper layers is poor, if the activity of lotic animals is very high, or if there is a large amount of organic decay occurring.

==== Suspended matter ====
Rivers can also transport suspended inorganic and organic matter. These materials can include sediment or terrestrially derived organic matter that falls into the stream channel. Often, organic matter is processed within the stream via mechanical fragmentation, consumption and grazing by invertebrates, and microbial decomposition. Leaves and woody debris recognizable coarse particulate organic matter (CPOM) into particulate organic matter (POM), down to fine particulate organic matter. Woody and non-woody plants have different instream breakdown rates, with leafy plants or plant parts (e.g., flower petals) breaking down faster than woody logs or branches.

=== Substrate ===
The inorganic substrate of lotic systems is composed of the geologic material present in the catchment that is eroded, transported, sorted, and deposited by the current. Inorganic substrates are classified by size on the Wentworth scale, which ranges from boulders, to pebbles, to gravel, to sand, and to silt. Typically, substrate particle size decreases downstream with larger boulders and stones in more mountainous areas and sandy bottoms in lowland rivers. This is because the higher gradients of mountain streams facilitate a faster flow, moving smaller substrate materials further downstream for deposition. Substrate can also be organic and may include fine particles, autumn shed leaves, large woody debris such as submerged tree logs, moss, and semi-aquatic plants. Substrate deposition is not necessarily a permanent event, as it can be subject to large modifications during flooding events.

== Biotic components (living) ==
The living components of an ecosystem are called the biotic components. Streams have numerous types of biotic organisms that live in them, including bacteria, primary producers, insects and other invertebrates, as well as fish and other vertebrates.

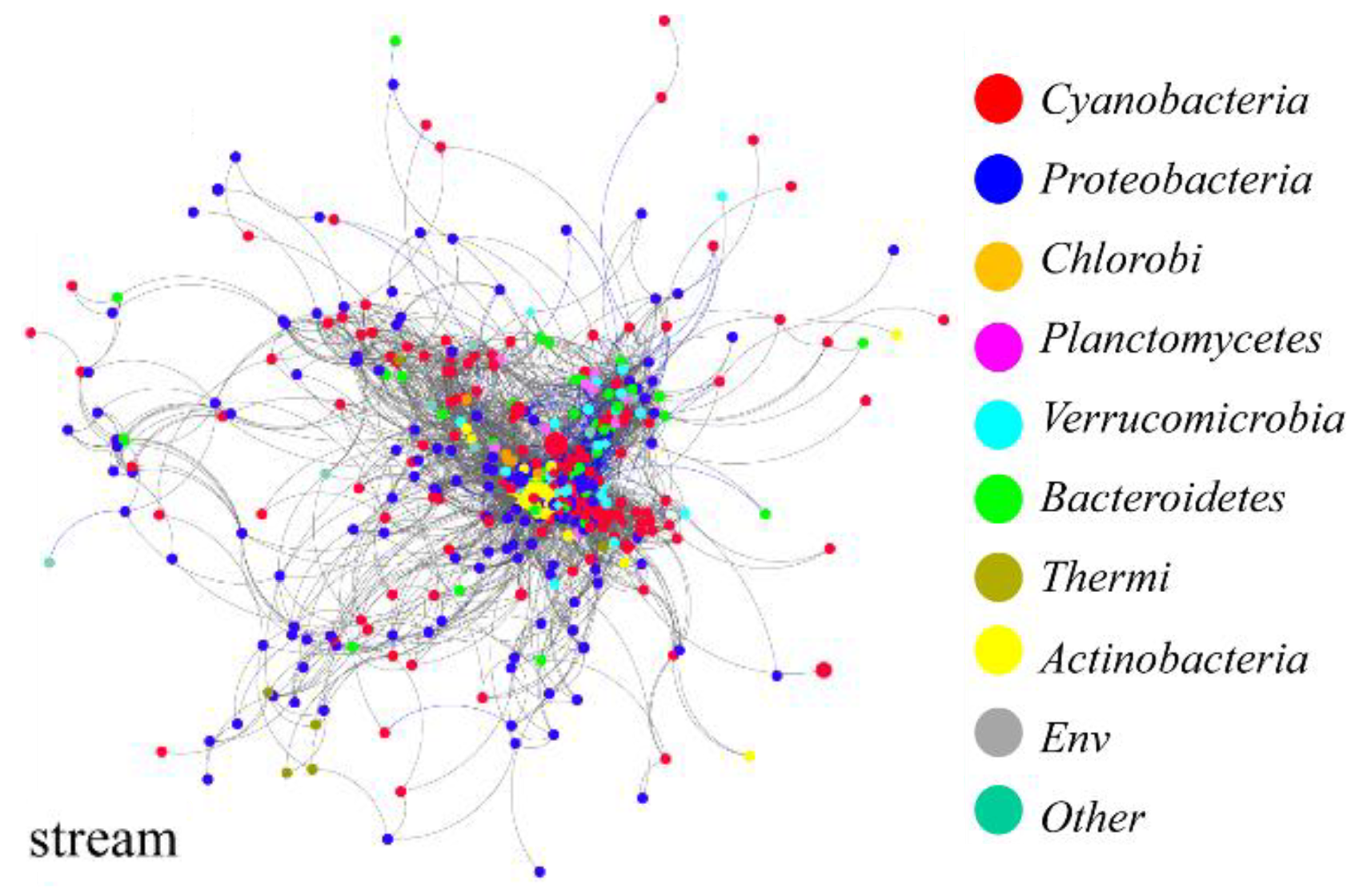
Co-occurrence network of a bacterial community in a stream

=== Microorganisms ===
Bacteria are present in large numbers in lotic waters. Free-living forms are associated with decomposing organic material, biofilm on the surfaces of rocks and vegetation, in between particles that compose the substrate, and suspended in the water column. Other forms are also associated with the guts of lotic organisms as parasites or in commensal relationships. Bacteria play a large role in energy recycling (see below).

Diatoms are one of the main dominant groups of periphytic algae in lotic systems and have been widely used as efficient indicators of water quality, because they respond quickly to environmental changes, especially organic pollution and eutrophication, with a broad spectrum of tolerances to conditions ranging, from oligotrophic to eutrophic.

Fungi are also very frequently present in lotic environments. These are mostly miscroscopic, and found for the most as asexual (anamorph) aquatic hyphomycete spores, or less frequently as sexual (teleomorph) spores freely floating in waters. However, the main body of the fungi, the mycelium, live freely in sediments, on decaying organic material, as parasites on or in other organisms (such as on animals, or algae), as endophytes, in plants, or as mutualists in the guts of insects.

=== Biofilm ===
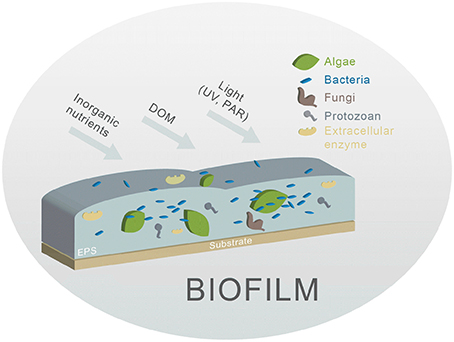
Different biofilm components in streams. Principal components are algae and bacteria.

A biofilm is a combination of algae (diatoms etc.), fungi, bacteria, and other small microorganisms that exist in a film along the streambed or the benthos. Biofilm assemblages themselves are complex, and add to the complexity of a streambed.

The different biofilm components (algae and bacteria are the principal components) are embedded in an exopolysaccharide matrix (EPS), and are net receptors of inorganic and organic elements and remain submitted to the influences of the different environmental factors.

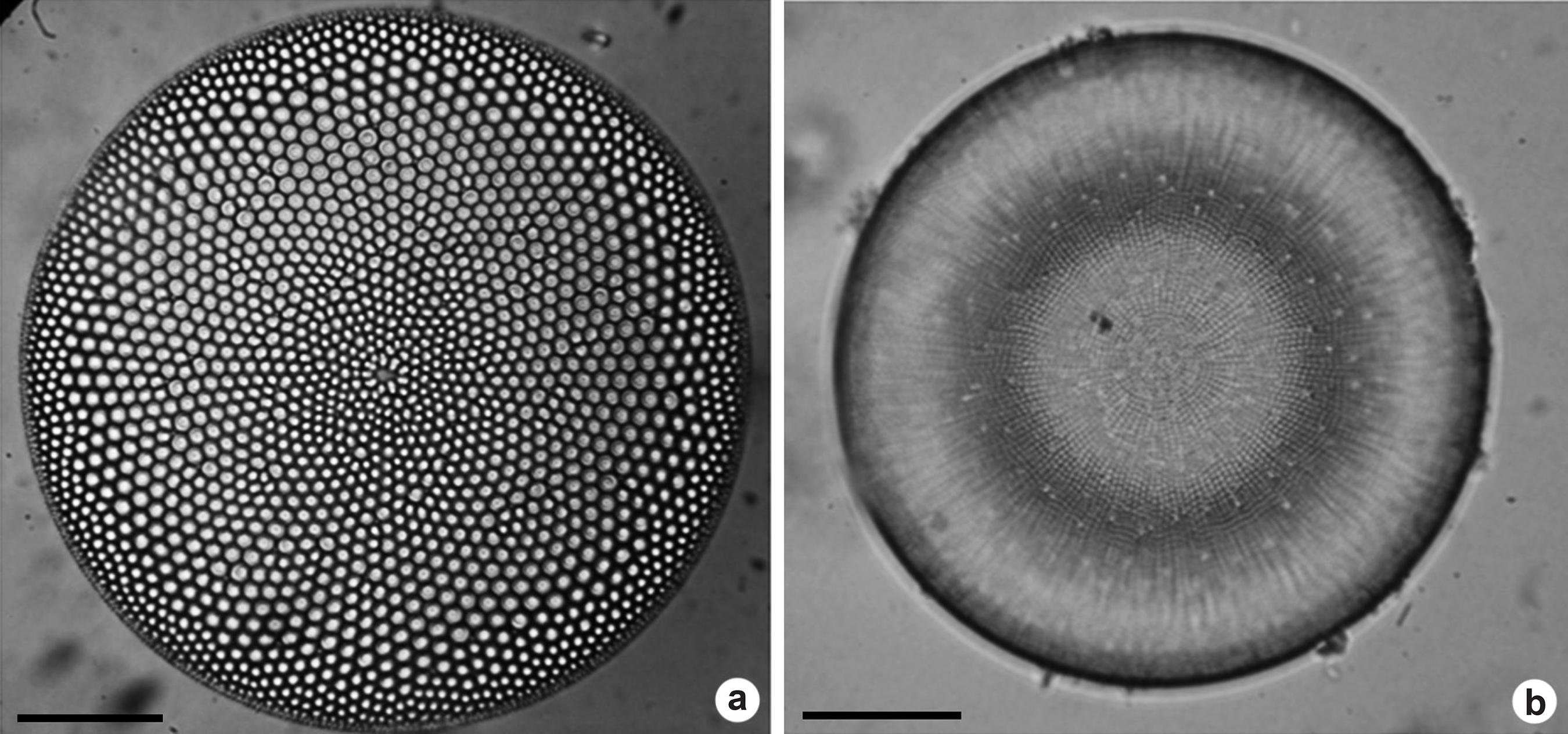
Epilithic diatoms from a river bed (size bars are 30 μm)

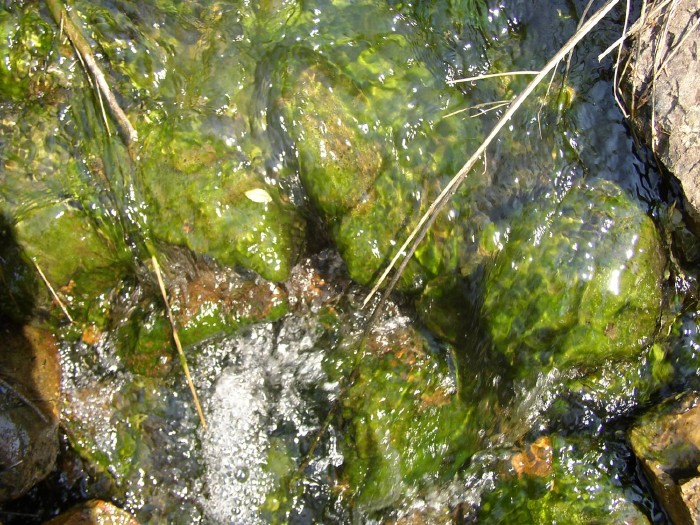
This slime on streambed cobbles is a biofilm

Biofilms are one of the main biological interphases in river ecosystems, and probably the most important in intermittent rivers, where the importance of the water column is reduced during extended low-activity periods of the hydrological cycle. Biofilms can be understood as microbial consortia of autotrophs and heterotrophs, coexisting in a matrix of hydrated extracellular polymeric substances (EPS). These two main biological components are respectively mainly algae and cyanobacteria on one side, and bacteria and fungi on the other. Micro- and meiofauna also inhabit the biofilm, predating on the organisms and organic particles and contributing to its evolution and dispersal. Biofilms therefore form a highly active biological consortium, ready to use organic and inorganic materials from the water phase, and also ready to use light or chemical energy sources. The EPS immobilize the cells and keep them in close proximity allowing for intense interactions including cell-cell communication and the formation of synergistic consortia. The EPS is able to retain extracellular enzymes and therefore allows the utilization of materials from the environment and the transformation of these materials into dissolved nutrients for the use by algae and bacteria. At the same time, the EPS contributes to protect the cells from desiccation as well from other hazards (e.g., biocides, UV radiation, etc.) from the outer world. On the other hand, the packing and the EPS protection layer limits the diffusion of gases and nutrients, especially for the cells far from the biofilm surface, and this limits their survival and creates strong gradients within the biofilm. Both the biofilm physical structure, and the plasticity of the organisms that live within it, ensure and support their survival in harsh environments or under changing environmental conditions.

=== Primary producers ===
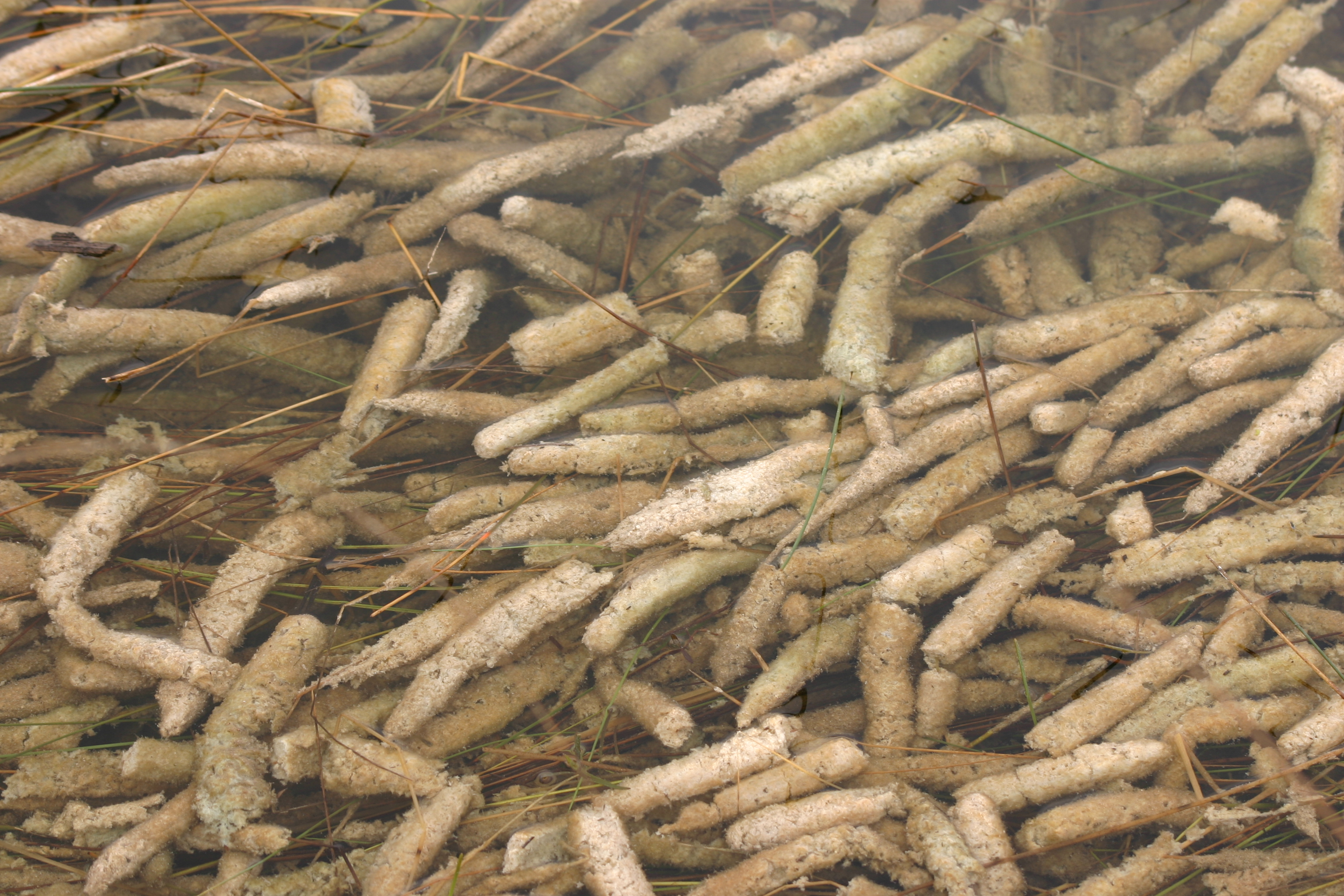
Periphyton

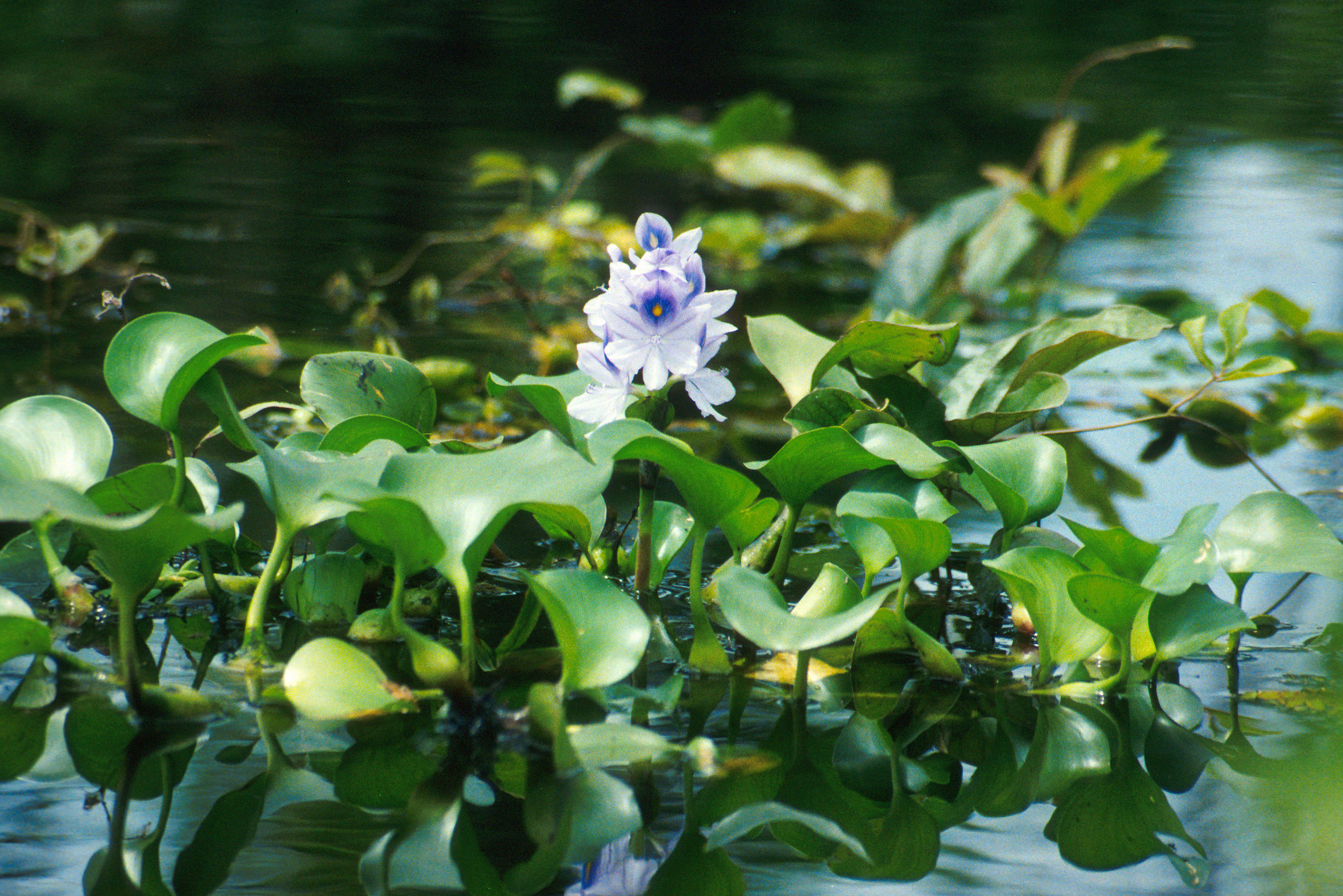
Common water hyacinth in flower

Algae, consisting of phytoplankton and periphyton, are the most significant sources of primary production in most streams and rivers. Phytoplankton float freely in the water column and thus are unable to maintain populations in fast flowing streams. They can, however, develop sizeable populations in slow moving rivers and backwaters. Periphyton are typically filamentous and tufted algae that can attach themselves to objects to avoid being washed away by fast currents. In places where flow rates are negligible or absent, periphyton may form a gelatinous, unanchored floating mat.

Plants exhibit limited adaptations to fast flow and are most successful in reduced currents. More primitive plants, such as mosses and liverworts attach themselves to solid objects. This typically occurs in colder headwaters where the mostly rocky substrate offers attachment sites. Some plants are free floating at the water's surface in dense mats like duckweed or water hyacinth. Others are rooted and may be classified as submerged or emergent. Rooted plants usually occur in areas of slackened current where fine-grained soils are found. These rooted plants are flexible, with elongated leaves that offer minimal resistance to current.

Living in flowing water can be beneficial to plants and algae because the current is usually well aerated and it provides a continuous supply of nutrients. These organisms are limited by flow, light, water chemistry, substrate, and grazing pressure. Algae and plants are important to lotic systems as sources of energy, for forming microhabitats that shelter other fauna from predators and the current, and as a food resource.

=== Insects and other invertebrates ===
Up to 90% of invertebrates in some lotic systems are insects. These species exhibit tremendous diversity and can be found occupying almost every available habitat, including the surfaces of stones, deep below the substratum in the hyporheic zone, adrift in the current, and in the surface film.

Insects have developed several strategies for living in the diverse flows of lotic systems. Some avoid high current areas, inhabiting the substratum or the sheltered side of rocks. Others have flat bodies to reduce the drag forces they experience from living in running water. Some insects, like the giant water bug (Belostomatidae), avoid flood events by leaving the stream when they sense rainfall. In addition to these behaviors and body shapes, insects have different life history adaptations to cope with the naturally occurring physical harshness of stream environments. Some insects time their life events based on when floods and droughts occur. For example, some mayflies synchronize when they emerge as flying adults with when snowmelt flooding usually occurs in Colorado streams. Other insects do not have a flying stage and spend their entire life cycle in the river.

Like most of the primary consumers, lotic invertebrates often rely heavily on the current to bring them food and oxygen. Invertebrates are important as both consumers and prey items in lotic systems.

The common orders of insects that are found in river ecosystems include Ephemeroptera (also known as a mayfly), Trichoptera (also known as a caddisfly), Plecoptera (also known as a stonefly, Diptera (also known as a true fly), some types of Coleoptera (also known as a beetle), Odonata (the group that includes the dragonfly and the damselfly), and some types of Hemiptera (also known as true bugs).

Additional invertebrate taxa common to flowing waters include mollusks such as snails, limpets, clams, mussels, as well as crustaceans like crayfish, amphipoda and crabs.

=== Fish and other vertebrates ===
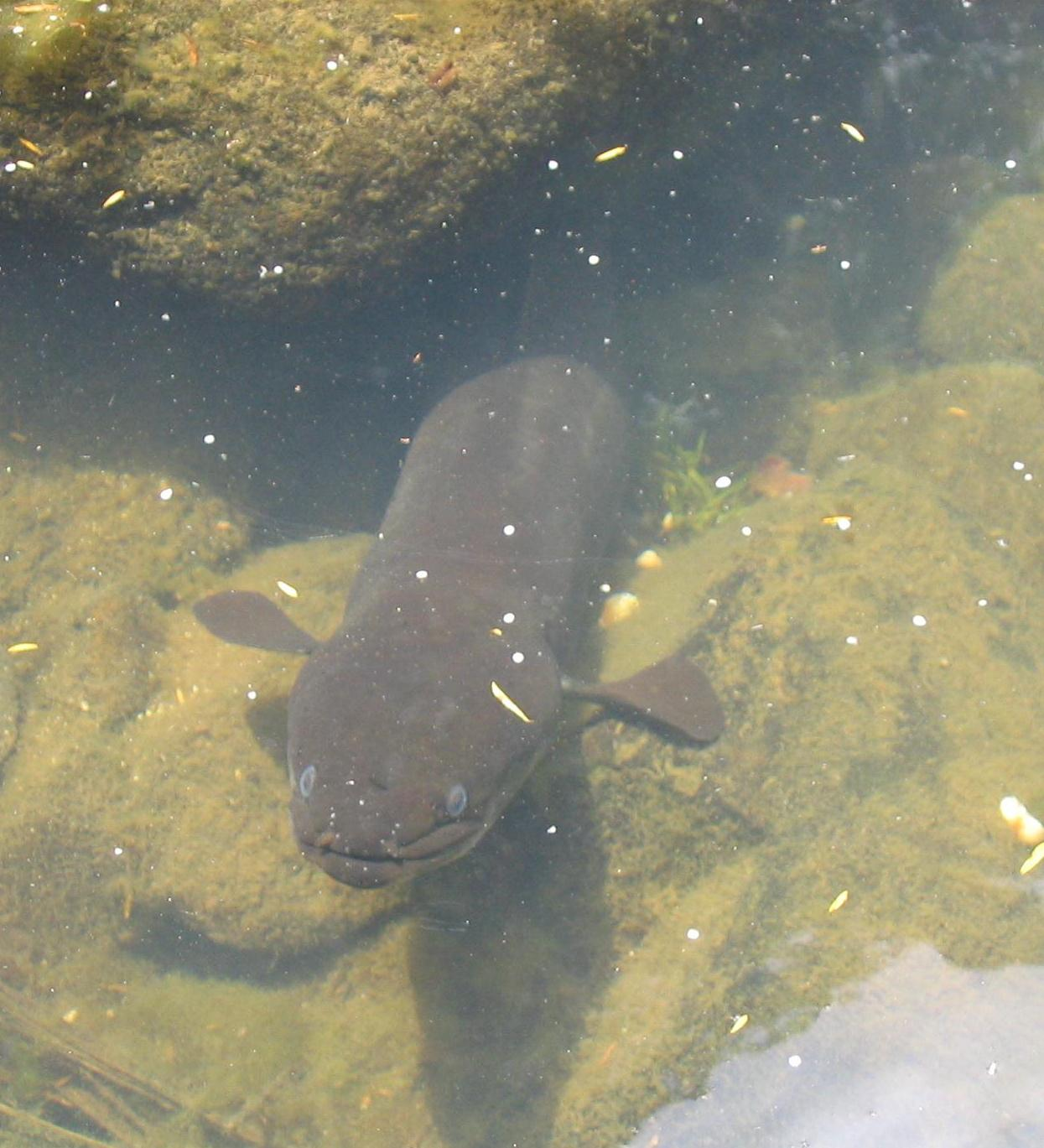
New Zealand longfin eels can weigh over 50 kilograms.

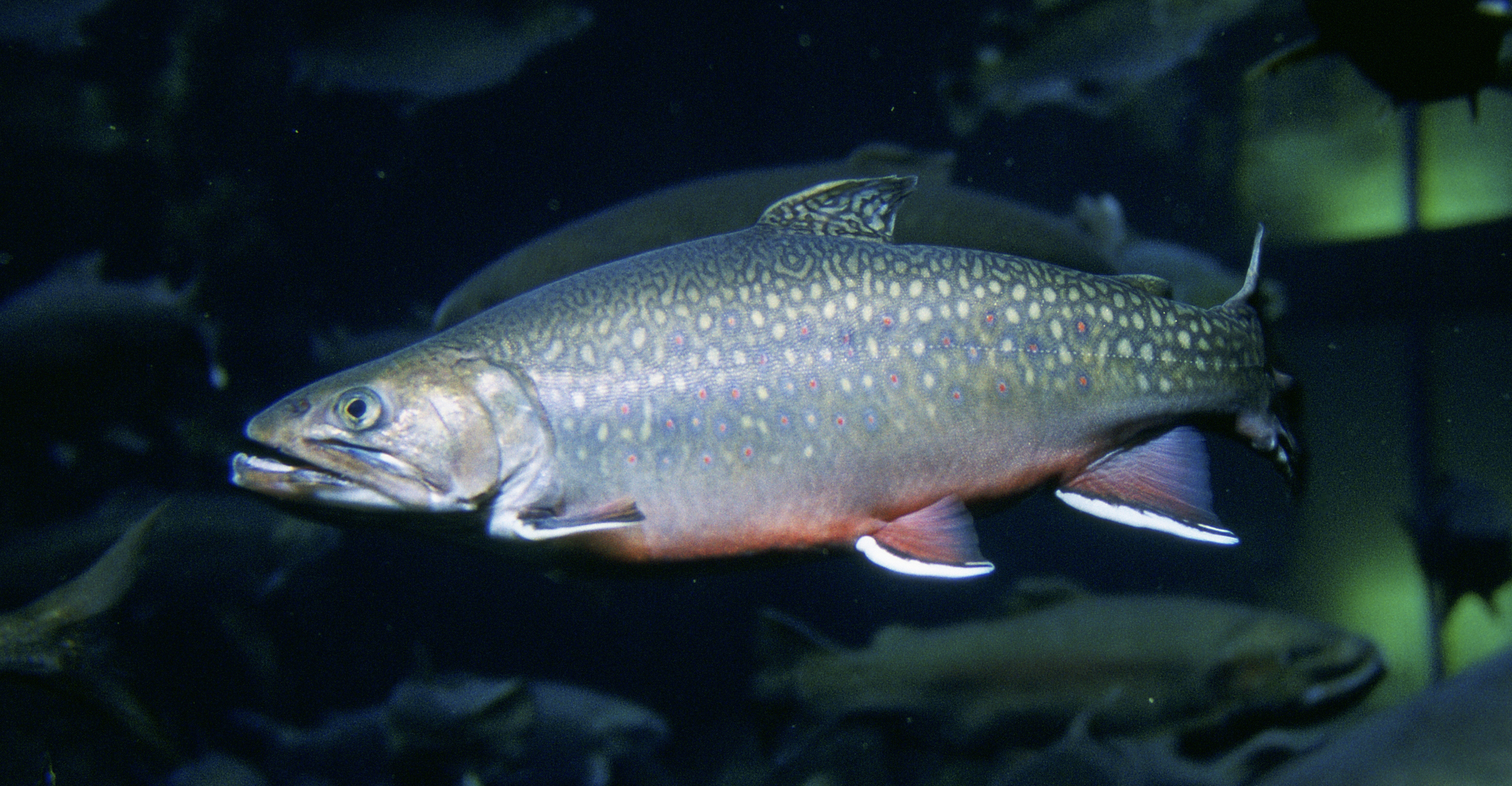
The brook trout is native to small streams, creeks, lakes, and spring ponds.

Fish are probably the best-known inhabitants of lotic systems. The ability of a fish species to live in flowing waters depends upon the speed at which it can swim and the duration that its speed can be maintained. This ability can vary greatly between species and is tied to the habitat in which it can survive. Continuous swimming expends a tremendous amount of energy and, therefore, fishes spend only short periods in full current. Instead, individuals remain close to the bottom or the banks, behind obstacles, and sheltered from the current, swimming in the current only to feed or change locations. Some species have adapted to living only on the system bottom, never venturing into the open water flow. These fishes are dorso-ventrally flattened to reduce flow resistance and often have eyes on top of their heads to observe what is happening above them. Some also have sensory barrels positioned under the head to assist in the testing of substratum.

Lotic systems typically connect to each other, forming a path to the ocean (spring → stream → river → ocean), and many fishes have life cycles that require stages in both fresh and salt water. Salmon, for example, are anadromous species that are born in freshwater but spend most of their adult life in the ocean, returning to fresh water only to spawn. Eels are catadromous species that do the opposite, living in freshwater as adults but migrating to the ocean to spawn.

Other vertebrate taxa that inhabit lotic systems include amphibians, such as salamanders, reptiles (e.g. snakes, turtles, crocodiles and alligators) various bird species, and mammals (e.g., otters, beavers, hippos, and river dolphins). With the exception of a few species, these vertebrates are not tied to water as fishes are, and spend part of their time in terrestrial habitats. Many fish species are important as consumers and as prey species to the larger vertebrates mentioned above.

== Trophic level dynamics ==
The concept of trophic levels are used in food webs to visualise the manner in which energy is transferred from one part of an ecosystem to another. Trophic levels can be assigned numbers determining how far an organism is along the food chain.

1. Level one: Producers, plant-like organisms that generate their own food using solar radiation, including algae, phytoplankton, mosses and lichens.
2. Level two: Consumers, animal-like organism that get their energy from eating producers, such as zooplankton, small fish, and crustaceans.
3. Level three: Decomposers, organisms that break down the dead matter of consumers and producers and return the nutrients back to the system. Example are bacteria and fungi.

All energy transactions within an ecosystem derive from a single external source of energy, the sun. Some of this solar radiation is used by producers (plants) to turn inorganic substances into organic substances which can be used as food by consumers (animals). Plants release portions of this energy back into the ecosystem through a catabolic process. Animals then consume the potential energy that is being released from the producers. This system is followed by the death of the consumer organism which then returns nutrients back into the ecosystem. This allow further growth for the plants, and the cycle continues. Breaking cycles down into levels makes it easier for ecologists to understand ecological succession when observing the transfer of energy within a system.

=== Top-down and bottom-up affect ===
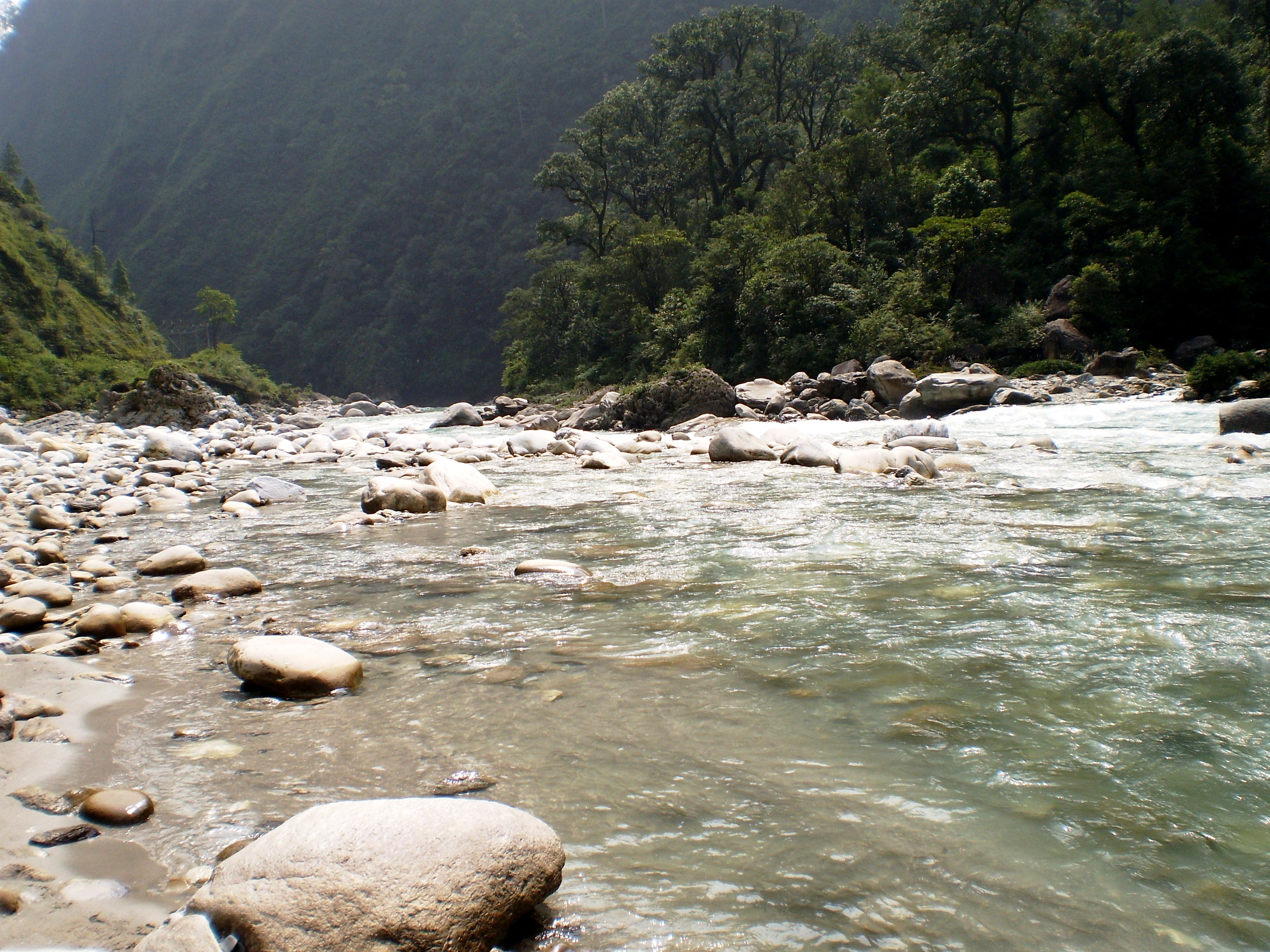
Flowing rivers can act as dispersal vectors for plant matter and invertebrates.

A common issue with trophic level dynamics is how resources and production are regulated. The usage and interaction between resources have a large impact on the structure of food webs as a whole. Temperature plays a role in food web interactions including top-down and bottom-up forces within ecological communities. Bottom-up regulations within a food web occur when a resource available at the base or bottom of the food web increases productivity, which then climbs the chain and influence the biomass availability to higher trophic organism. Top-down regulations occur when a predator population increases. This limits the available prey population, which limits the availability of energy for lower trophic levels within the food chain. Many biotic and abiotic factors can influence top-down and bottom-up interactions.

=== Trophic cascade ===
Another example of food web interactions are trophic cascades. Understanding trophic cascades has allowed ecologists to better understand the structure and dynamics of food webs within an ecosystem. The phenomenon of trophic cascades allows keystone predators to structure entire food web in terms of how they interact with their prey. Trophic cascades can cause drastic changes in the energy flow within a food web. For example, when a top or keystone predator consumes organisms below them in the food web, the density and behavior of the prey will change. This, in turn, affects the abundance of organisms consumed further down the chain, resulting in a cascade down the trophic levels. However, empirical evidence shows trophic cascades are much more prevalent in terrestrial food webs than aquatic food webs.

== Food chain ==
Example of a river food web. Fungi (aquatic hyphomycetes) and Bacteria can be seen in the red box at the bottom. Fungi and bacteria (and other decomposers, like worms) decompose and recycle nutrients back to the habitat, which is shown by the light blue arrows. Without fungi and bacteria, the rest of the food web would starve, because there would not be enough nutrients for the animals higher up in the food web. The dark orange arrows show how some animals consume others in the food web. For example, crayfish may be eaten by humans. The dark blue arrows represent one complete food chain, beginning with the consumption of algae by the water flea, Daphnia, which is consumed by a gizzard shad, which is consumed by a largemouth bass, which is at the end consumed by the great blue heron.

A food chain is a linear system of links that is part of a food web, and represents the order in which organisms are consumed from one trophic level to the next. Each link in a food chain is associated with a trophic level in the ecosystem. The numbered steps it takes for the initial source of energy starting from the bottom to reach the top of the food web is called the food chain length. While food chain lengths can fluctuate, aquatic ecosystems start with primary producers that are consumed by primary consumers which are consumed by secondary consumers, and those in turn can be consumed by tertiary consumers so on and so forth until the top of the food chain has been reached. When the top has been reached, or even before then, there are decomposers that utilize dead organic material, and are releasing nutrients into the environment, or are then again eaten by other organisms.

=== Primary producers ===
Primary producers start every food chain. Their production of energy and nutrients comes from the sun through photosynthesis. Algae contributes to a lot of the energy and nutrients at the base of the food chain along with terrestrial litter-fall that enters the stream or river. Production of organic compounds like carbon is what gets transferred up the food chain. Primary producers are consumed by herbivorous invertebrates that act as the primary consumers. Productivity of these producers and the function of the ecosystem as a whole are influenced by the organism above it in the food chain.

=== Primary consumers ===
Primary consumers are the invertebrates and macro-invertebrates that feed upon the primary producers. They play an important role in initiating the transfer of energy from the base trophic level to the next. They are regulatory organisms which facilitate and control rates of nutrient cycling and the mixing of aquatic and terrestrial plant materials. They also transport and retain some of those nutrients and materials. There are many different functional groups of these invertebrate, including grazers, organisms that feed on algal biofilm that collects on submerged objects, shredders that feed on large leaves and detritus and help break down large material. Also filter feeders, macro-invertebrates that rely on stream flow to deliver them fine particulate organic matter (FPOM) suspended in the water column, and gatherers who feed on FPOM found on the substrate of the river or stream.

=== Secondary consumers ===
The secondary consumers in a river ecosystem are the predators of the primary consumers. This includes mainly insectivorous fish. Consumption by invertebrate insects and macro-invertebrates is another step of energy flow up the food chain. Depending on their abundance, these predatory consumers can shape an ecosystem by the manner in which they affect the trophic levels below them. When fish are at high abundance and eat lots of invertebrates, then algal biomass and primary production in the stream is greater, and when secondary consumers are not present, then algal biomass may decrease due to the high abundance of primary consumers. Energy and nutrients that starts with primary producers continues to make its way up the food chain and depending on the ecosystem, may end with these predatory fish.

=== Decomposers ===
The decomposers in a river system are composed of bacteria, fungi, protists, and many invertebrates like insects and snails. They are crucial to benthic food webs and in the river ecosystem as a whole. The fungi and bacteria in river ecosystems live mostly on decaying organic matter from animals and plants. The decomposing fungi in river ecosystems include saprotrophs, living on leaf litter and submerged wood, and other dead organic matierials. The protists include pseudofungi like oomycetes that also are found on leaves and submerged plant material. The invertebrates include arthropods and molluscs. Most benthic insects and certain snails are functionally classified as "shredders" that break down plant material.

== Food web complexity ==
Diversity, productivity, species richness, composition and stability are all interconnected by a series of feedback loops. Communities can have a series of complex, direct and/or indirect, responses to major changes in biodiversity. Food webs can include a wide array of variables, the three main variables ecologists look at regarding ecosystems include species richness, biomass of productivity and stability/resistant to change. When a species is added or removed from an ecosystem it will have an effect on the remaining food web, the intensity of this effect is related to species connectedness and food web robustness. When a new species is added to a river ecosystem the intensity of the effect is related to the robustness or resistance to change of the current food web. When a species is removed from a river ecosystem the intensity of the effect is related to the connectedness of the species to the food web. An invasive species could be removed with little to no effect, but if important and native primary producers, prey or predatory fish are removed you could have a negative trophic cascade. One highly variable component to river ecosystems is food supply (biomass of primary producers). Food supply or type of producers is ever changing with the seasons and differing habitats within the river ecosystem. Another highly variable component to river ecosystems is nutrient input from wetland and terrestrial detritus. Food and nutrient supply variability is important for the succession, robustness and connectedness of river ecosystem organisms.

== Trophic relationships ==
=== Energy inputs ===
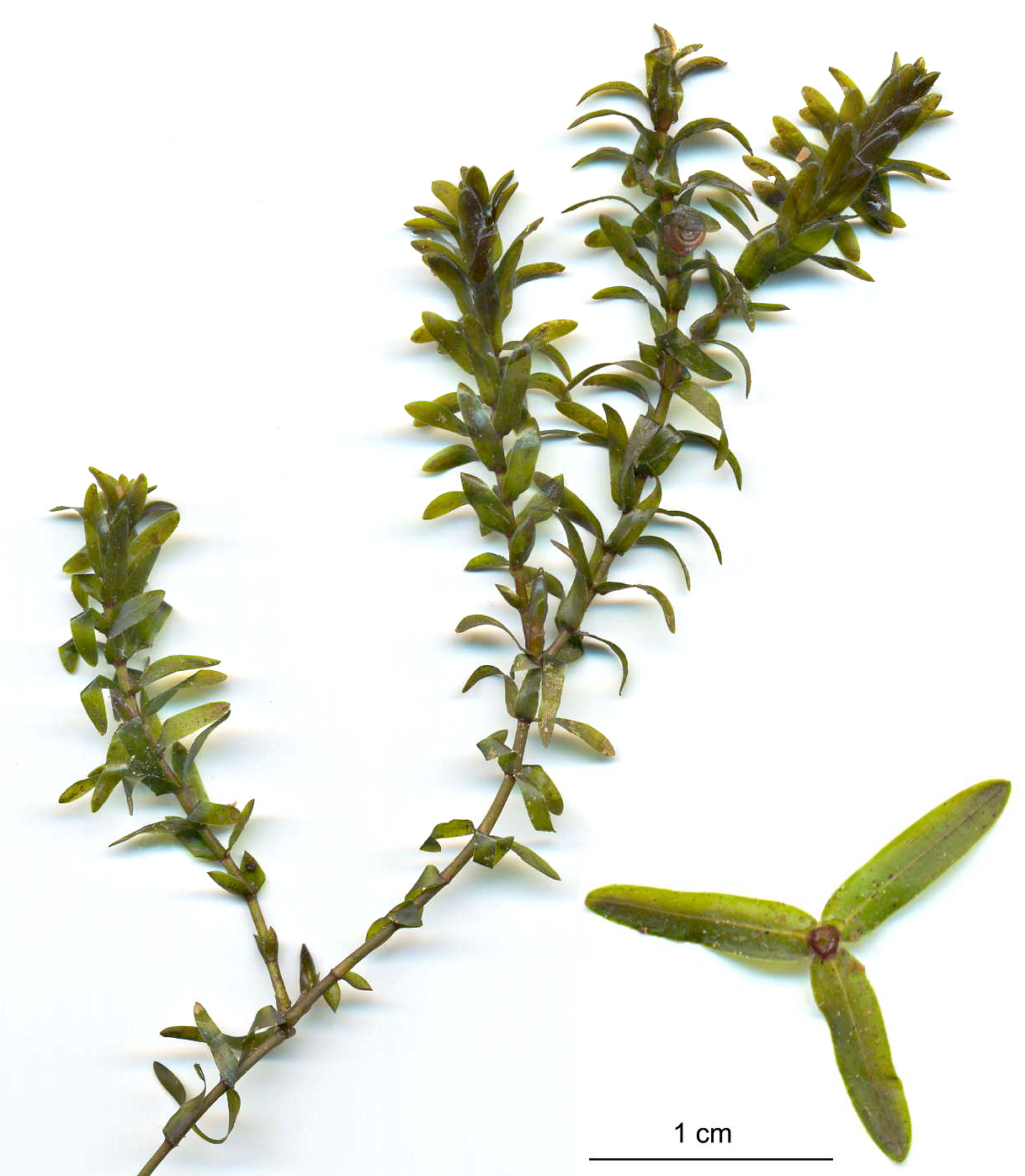
Pondweed is an autochthonous energy source.

Energy sources can be autochthonous or allochthonous.

- Autochthonous (from the Latin "auto" = "self) energy sources are those derived from within the lotic system. During photosynthesis, for example, primary producers form organic carbon compounds out of carbon dioxide and inorganic matter. The energy they produce is important for the community because it may be transferred to higher trophic levels via consumption. Additionally, high rates of primary production can introduce dissolved organic matter (DOM) to the waters. Another form of autochthonous energy comes from the decomposition of dead organisms and feces that originate within the lotic system. In this case, bacteria decompose the detritus or coarse particulate organic material (CPOM; >1 mm pieces) into fine particulate organic matter (FPOM; <1 mm pieces) and then further into inorganic compounds that are required for photosynthesis. This process is discussed in more detail below.

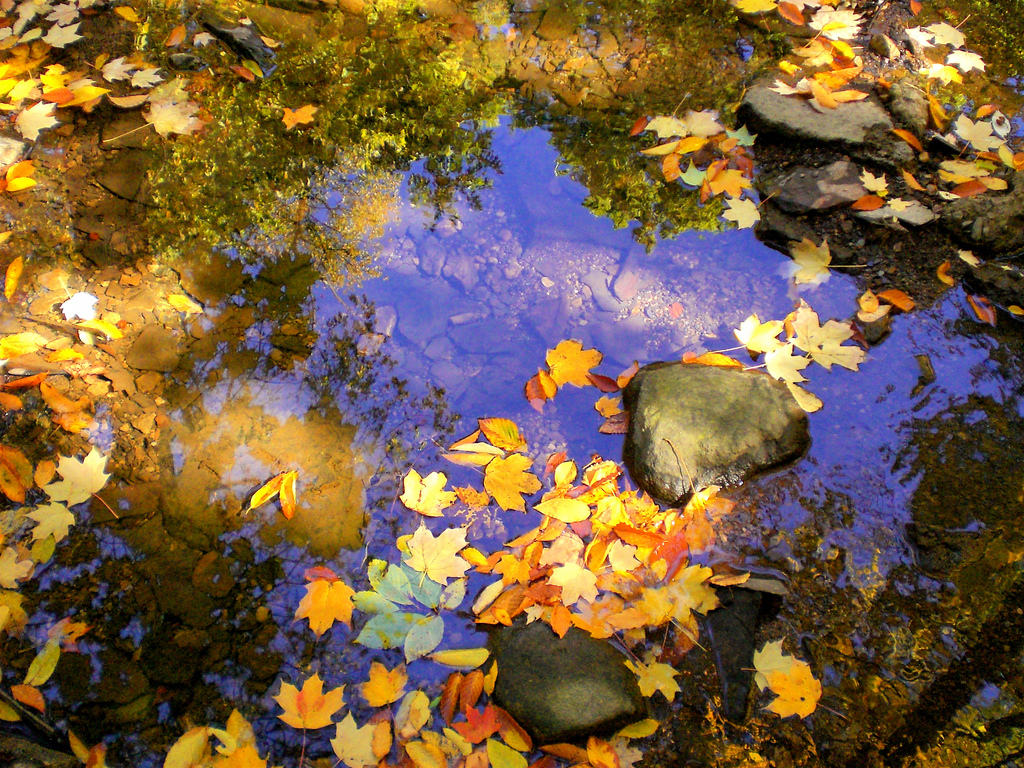
Leaf litter is an allochthonous energy source.

- Allochthonous energy sources are those derived from outside the lotic system, that is, from the terrestrial environment. Leaves, twigs, fruits, etc. are typical forms of terrestrial CPOM that have entered the water by direct litter fall or lateral leaf blow. In addition, terrestrial animal-derived materials, such as feces or carcasses that have been added to the system are examples of allochthonous CPOM. The CPOM undergoes a specific process of degradation. Allan gives the example of a leaf fallen into a stream. First, the soluble chemicals are dissolved and leached from the leaf upon its saturation with water. This adds to the DOM load in the system. Next microbes such as bacteria and fungi colonize the leaf, softening it as the mycelium of the fungus grows into it. The composition of the microbial community is influenced by the species of tree from which the leaves are shed (Rubbo and Kiesecker 2004). This combination of bacteria, fungi, and leaf are a food source for shredding invertebrates, which leave only FPOM after consumption. These fine particles may be colonized by microbes again or serve as a food source for animals that consume FPOM. Organic matter can also enter the lotic system already in the FPOM stage by wind, surface runoff, bank erosion, or groundwater. Similarly, DOM can be introduced through canopy drip from rain or from surface flows.

=== Invertebrates ===
Invertebrates can be organized into many feeding guilds in lotic systems. Some species are shredders, which use large and powerful mouth parts to feed on non-woody CPOM and their associated microorganisms. Others are suspension feeders, which use their setae, filtering aparati, nets, or even secretions to collect FPOM and microbes from the water. These species may be passive collectors, utilizing the natural flow of the system, or they may generate their own current to draw water, and also, FPOM in Allan. Members of the gatherer-collector guild actively search for FPOM under rocks and in other places where the stream flow has slackened enough to allow deposition. Grazing invertebrates utilize scraping, rasping, and browsing adaptations to feed on periphyton and detritus. Finally, several families are predatory, capturing and consuming animal prey. Both the number of species and the abundance of individuals within each guild is largely dependent upon food availability. Thus, these values may vary across both seasons and systems.

=== Fish ===
Fish can also be placed into feeding guilds. Planktivores pick plankton out of the water column. Herbivore-detritivores are bottom-feeding species that ingest both periphyton and detritus indiscriminately. Surface and water column feeders capture surface prey (mainly terrestrial and emerging insects) and drift (benthic invertebrates floating downstream). Benthic invertebrate feeders prey primarily on immature insects, but will also consume other benthic invertebrates. Top predators consume fishes and/or large invertebrates. Omnivores ingest a wide range of prey. These can be floral, faunal, and/or detrital in nature. Finally, parasites live off of host species, typically other fishes. Fish are flexible in their feeding roles, capturing different prey with regard to seasonal availability and their own developmental stage. Thus, they may occupy multiple feeding guilds in their lifetime. The number of species in each guild can vary greatly between systems, with temperate warm water streams having the most benthic invertebrate feeders, and tropical systems having large numbers of detritus feeders due to high rates of allochthonous input.

== Community patterns and diversity ==
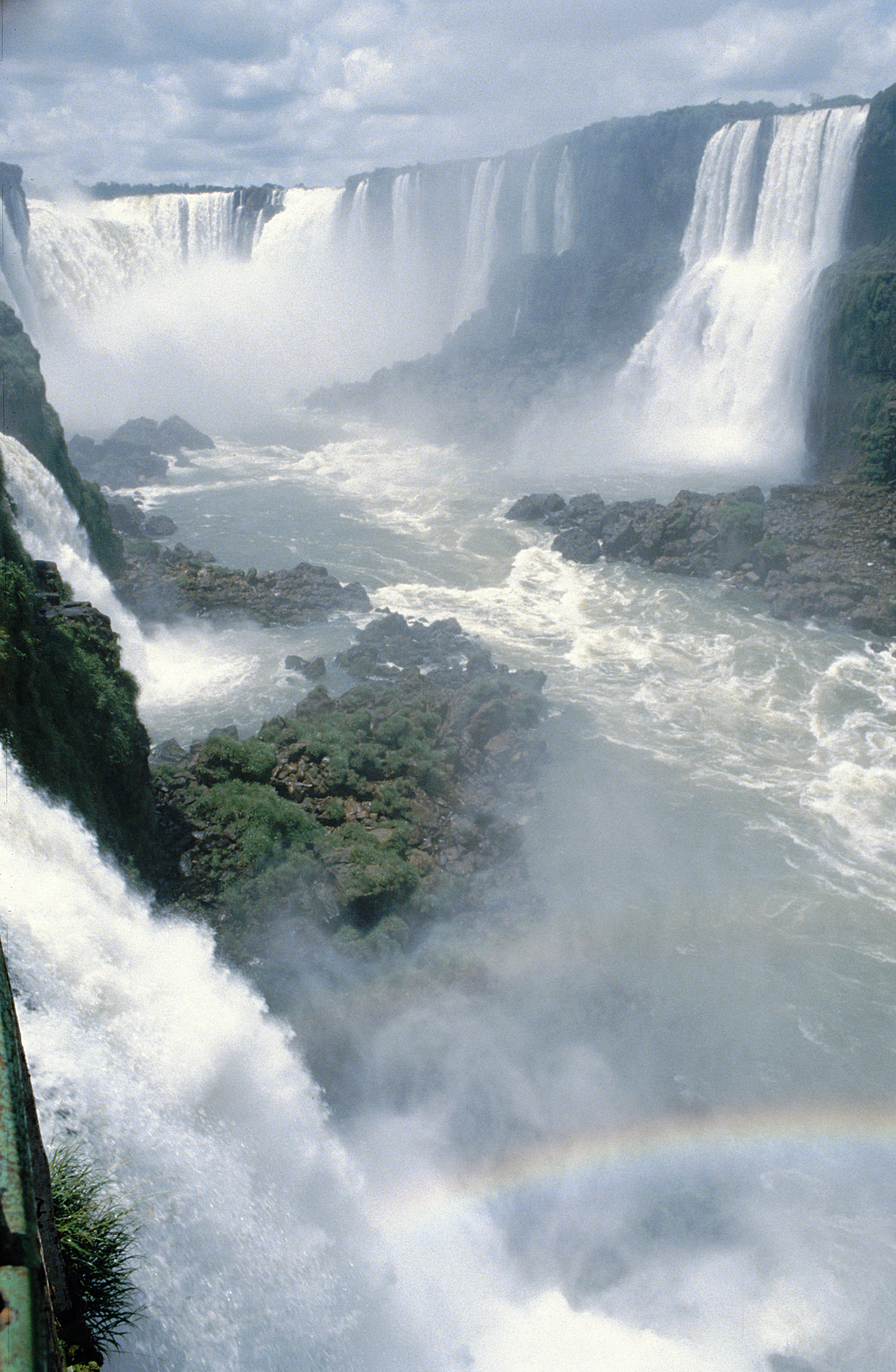
Iguazu Falls – an extreme lotic environment

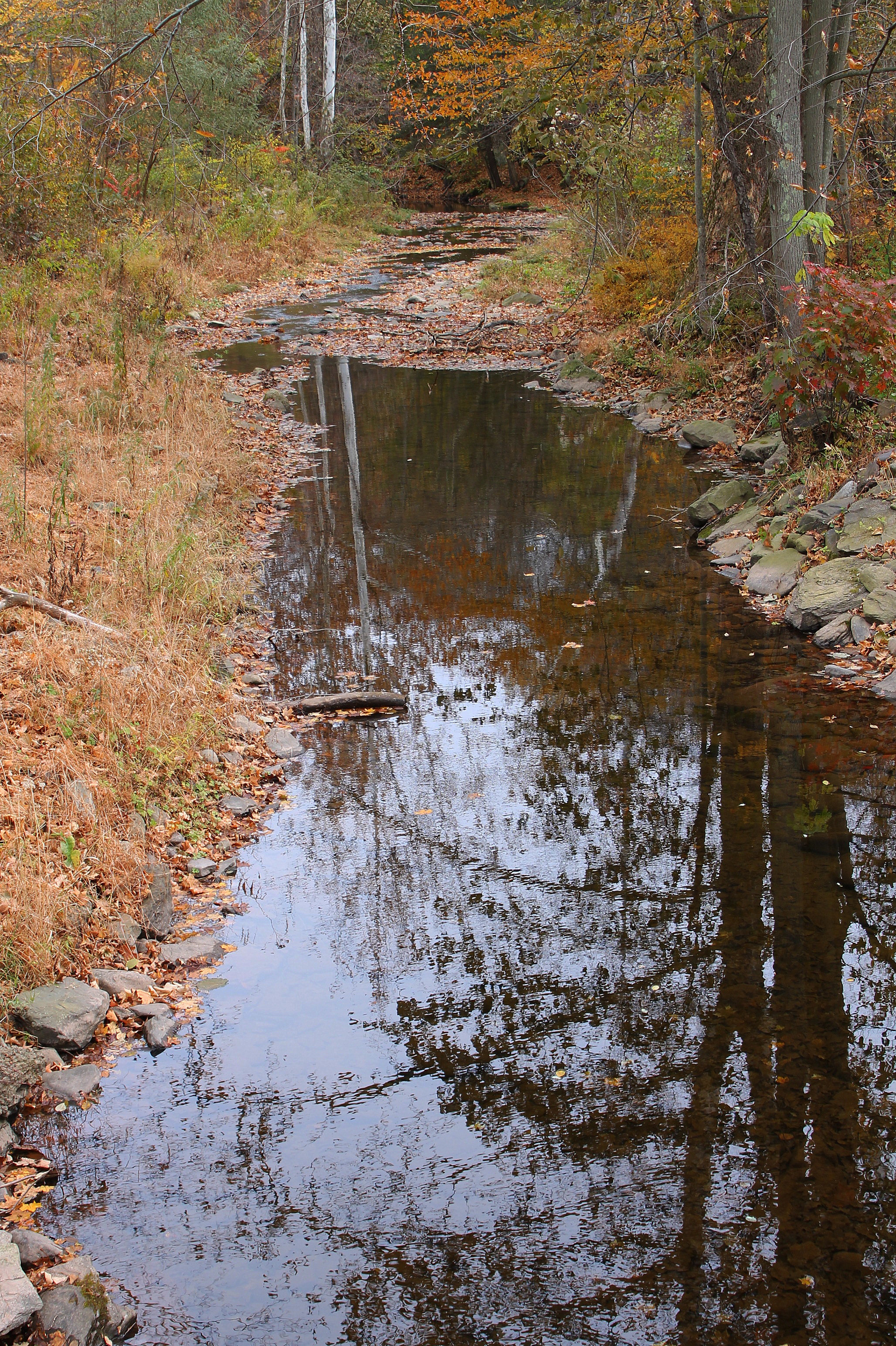
Beaver Run – a placid lotic environment

=== Local species richness ===
Large rivers have comparatively more species than small streams. Many relate this pattern to the greater area and volume of larger systems, as well as an increase in habitat diversity. Some systems, however, show a poor fit between system size and species richness. In these cases, a combination of factors such as historical rates of speciation and extinction, type of substrate, microhabitat availability, water chemistry, temperature, and disturbance such as flooding seem to be important.

=== Resource partitioning ===
Although many alternate theories have been postulated for the ability of guild-mates to coexist (see Morin 1999), resource partitioning has been well documented in lotic systems as a means of reducing competition. The three main types of resource partitioning include habitat, dietary, and temporal segregation.

Habitat segregation was found to be the most common type of resource partitioning in natural systems (Schoener, 1974). In lotic systems, microhabitats provide a level of physical complexity that can support a diverse array of organisms (Vincin and Hawknis, 1998). The separation of species by substrate preferences has been well documented for invertebrates. Ward (1992) was able to divide substrate dwellers into six broad assemblages, including those that live in: coarse substrate, gravel, sand, mud, woody debris, and those associated with plants, showing one layer of segregation. On a smaller scale, further habitat partitioning can occur on or around a single substrate, such as a piece of gravel. Some invertebrates prefer the high flow areas on the exposed top of the gravel, while others reside in the crevices between one piece of gravel and the next, while still others live on the bottom of this gravel piece.

Dietary segregation is the second-most common type of resource partitioning. High degrees of morphological specializations or behavioral differences allow organisms to use specific resources. The size of nets built by some species of invertebrate suspension feeders, for example, can filter varying particle size of FPOM from the water (Edington et al. 1984). Similarly, members in the grazing guild can specialize in the harvesting of algae or detritus depending upon the morphology of their scraping apparatus. In addition, certain species seem to show a preference for specific algal species.

Temporal segregation is a less common form of resource partitioning, but it is nonetheless an observed phenomenon. Typically, it accounts for coexistence by relating it to differences in life history patterns and the timing of maximum growth among guild mates. Tropical fishes in Borneo, for example, have shifted to shorter life spans in response to the ecological niche reduction felt with increasing levels of species richness in their ecosystem (Watson and Balon 1984).

=== Persistence and succession ===
Over long time scales, there is a tendency for species composition in pristine systems to remain in a stable state. This has been found for both invertebrate and fish species. On shorter time scales, however, flow variability and unusual precipitation patterns decrease habitat stability and can all lead to declines in persistence levels. The ability to maintain this persistence over long time scales is related to the ability of lotic systems to return to the original community configuration relatively quickly after a disturbance (Townsend et al. 1987). This is one example of temporal succession, a site-specific change in a community involving changes in species composition over time. Another form of temporal succession might occur when a new habitat is opened up for colonization. In these cases, an entirely new community that is well adapted to the conditions found in this new area can establish itself.

=== River continuum concept ===
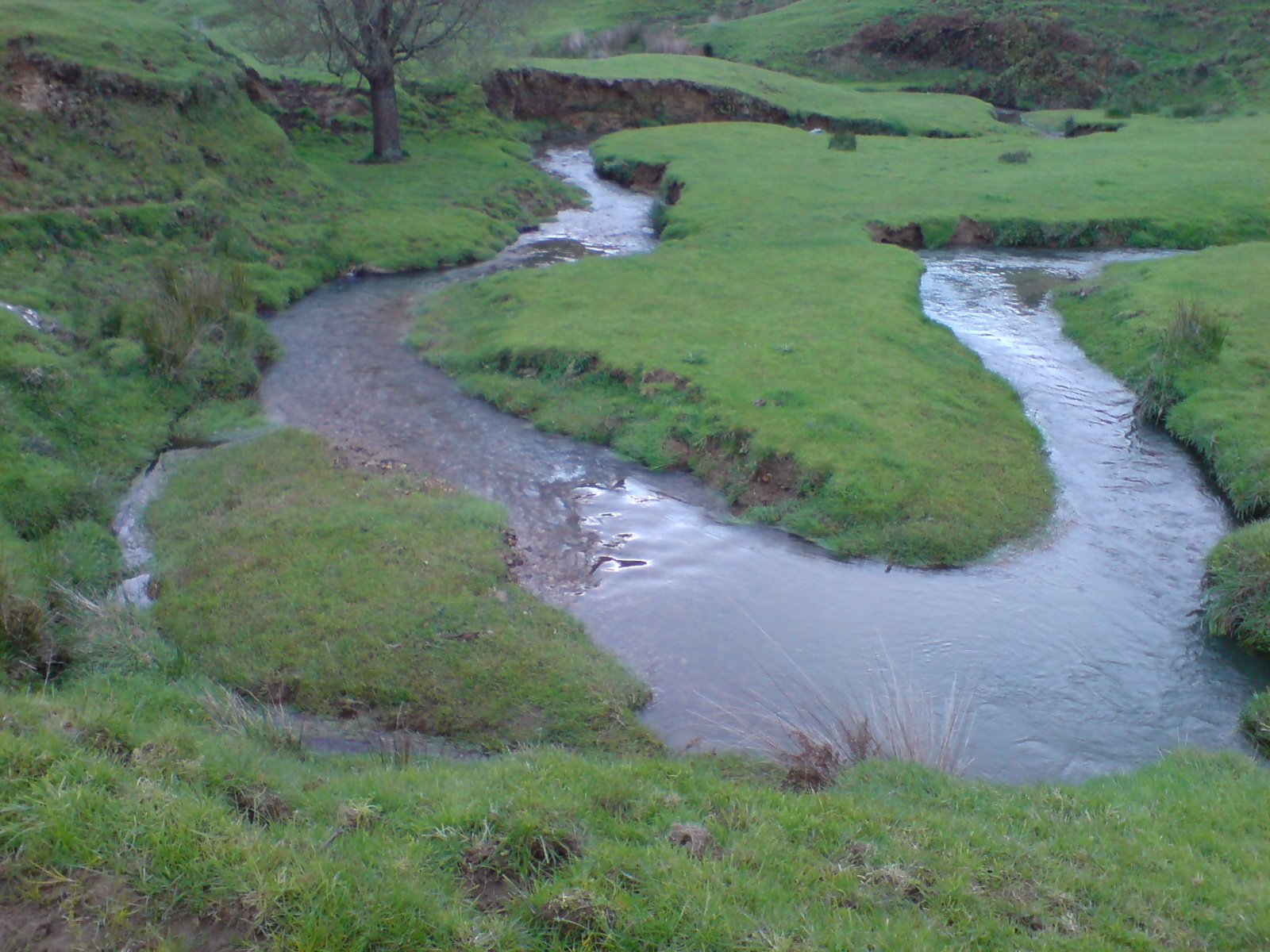
Meandering stream in Waitomo, New Zealand

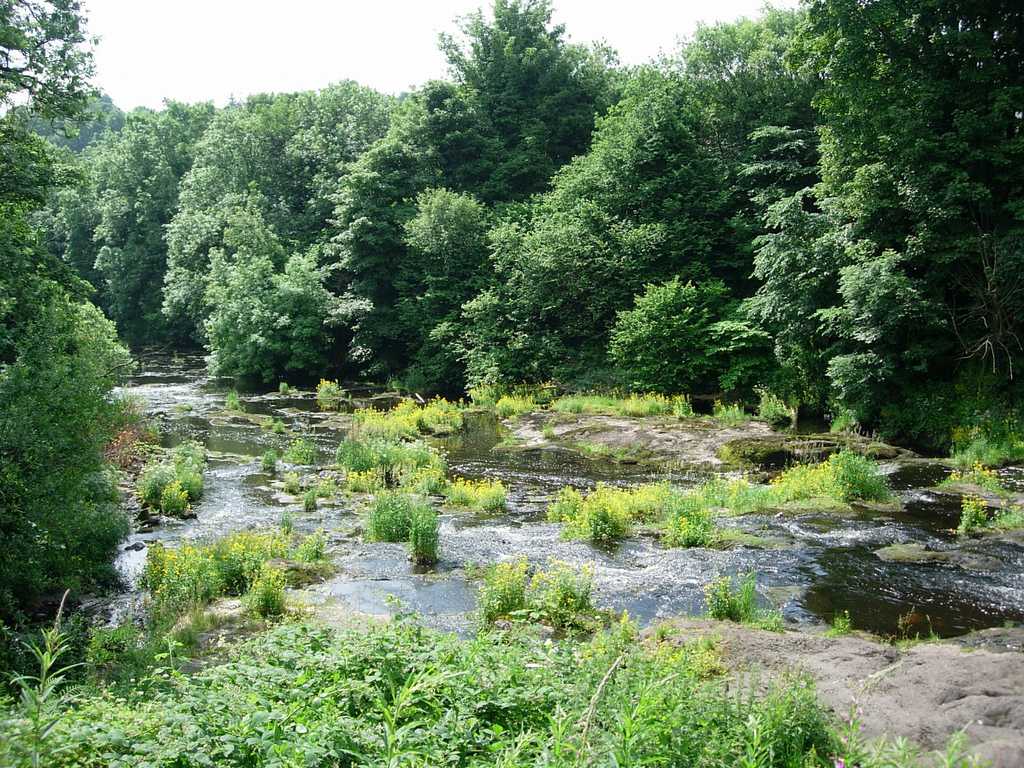
River Gryffe in Scotland

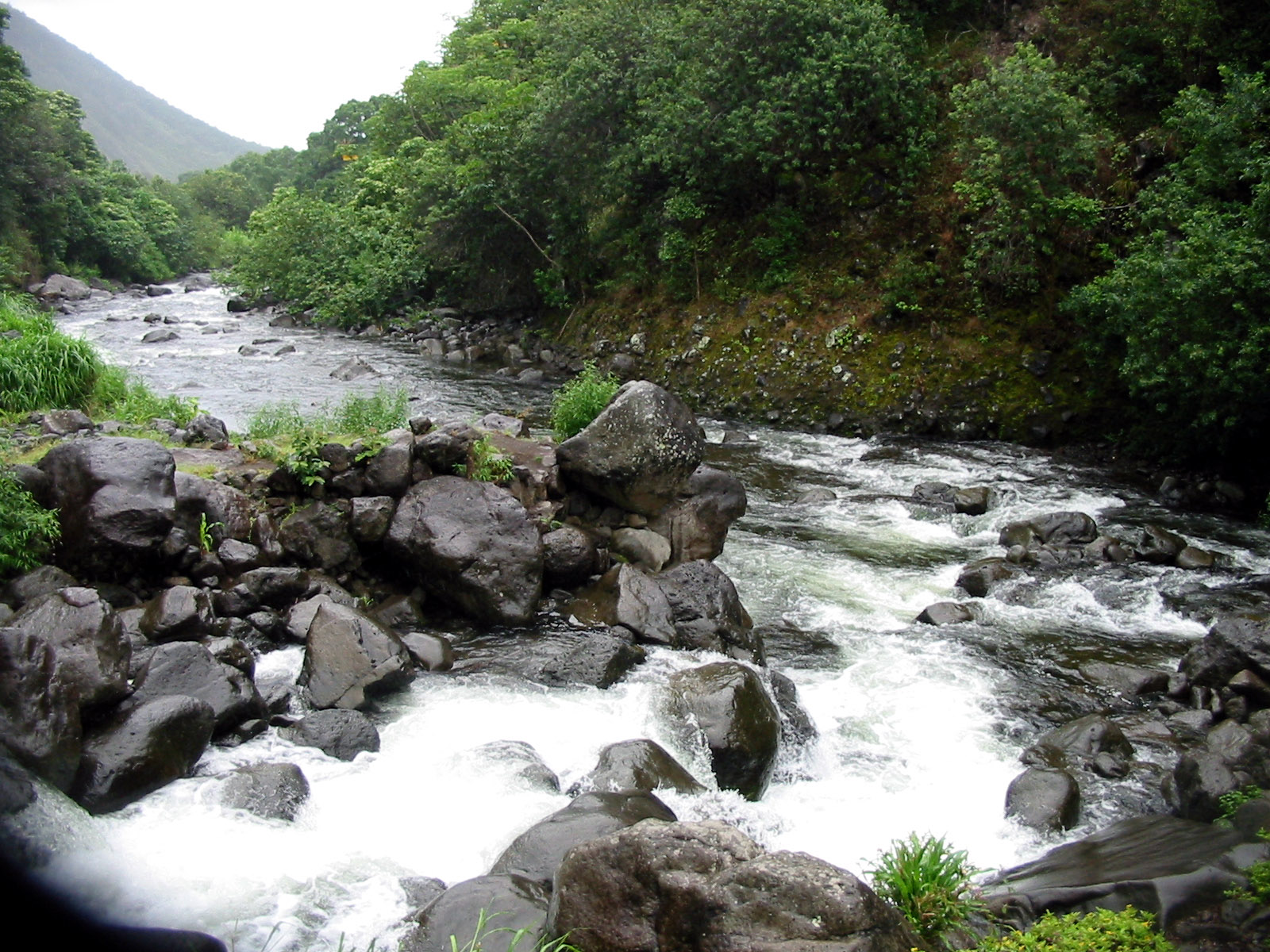
Rocky stream in Hawaii

The River continuum concept (RCC) was an attempt to construct a single framework to describe the function of temperate lotic ecosystems from the headwaters to larger rivers and relate key characteristics to changes in the biotic community. The physical basis for RCC is size and location along the gradient from a small stream eventually linked to a large river. Stream order (see characteristics of streams) is used as the physical measure of the position along the RCC.

According to the RCC, low ordered sites are small shaded streams where allochthonous inputs of CPOM are a necessary resource for consumers. As the river widens at mid-ordered sites, energy inputs should change. Ample sunlight should reach the bottom in these systems to support significant periphyton production. Additionally, the biological processing of CPOM (coarse particulate organic matter – larger than 1 mm) inputs at upstream sites is expected to result in the transport of large amounts of FPOM (fine particulate organic matter – smaller than 1 mm) to these downstream ecosystems. Plants should become more abundant at edges of the river with increasing river size, especially in lowland rivers where finer sediments have been deposited and facilitate rooting. The main channels likely have too much current and turbidity and a lack of substrate to support plants or periphyton. Phytoplankton should produce the only autochthonous inputs here, but photosynthetic rates will be limited due to turbidity and mixing. Thus, allochthonous inputs are expected to be the primary energy source for large rivers. This FPOM will come from both upstream sites via the decomposition process and through lateral inputs from floodplains.

Biota should change with this change in energy from the headwaters to the mouth of these systems. Namely, shredders should prosper in low-ordered systems and grazers in mid-ordered sites. Microbial decomposition should play the largest role in energy production for low-ordered sites and large rivers, while photosynthesis, in addition to degraded allochthonous inputs from upstream will be essential in mid-ordered systems. As mid-ordered sites will theoretically receive the largest variety of energy inputs, they might be expected to host the most biological diversity.

Just how well the RCC actually reflects patterns in natural systems is uncertain and its generality can be a handicap when applied to diverse and specific situations. The most noted criticisms of the RCC are: 1. It focuses mostly on macroinvertebrates, disregarding that plankton and fish diversity is highest in high orders; 2. It relies heavily on the fact that low ordered sites have high CPOM inputs, even though many streams lack riparian habitats; 3. It is based on pristine systems, which rarely exist today; and 4. It is centered around the functioning of temperate streams. Despite its shortcomings, the RCC remains a useful idea for describing how the patterns of ecological functions in a lotic system can vary from the source to the mouth.

Disturbances such as congestion by dams or natural events such as shore flooding are not included in the RCC model. Various researchers have since expanded the model to account for such irregularities. For example, J.V. Ward and J.A. Stanford came up with the Serial Discontinuity Concept in 1983, which addresses the impact of geomorphologic disorders such as congestion and integrated inflows. The same authors presented the Hyporheic Corridor concept in 1993, in which the vertical (in depth) and lateral (from shore to shore) structural complexity of the river were connected. The flood pulse concept, developed by W. J. Junk in 1989, further modified by P. B. Bayley in 1990 and K. Tockner in 2000, takes into account the large amount of nutrients and organic material that makes its way into a river from the sediment of surrounding flooded land.

== Human impacts ==
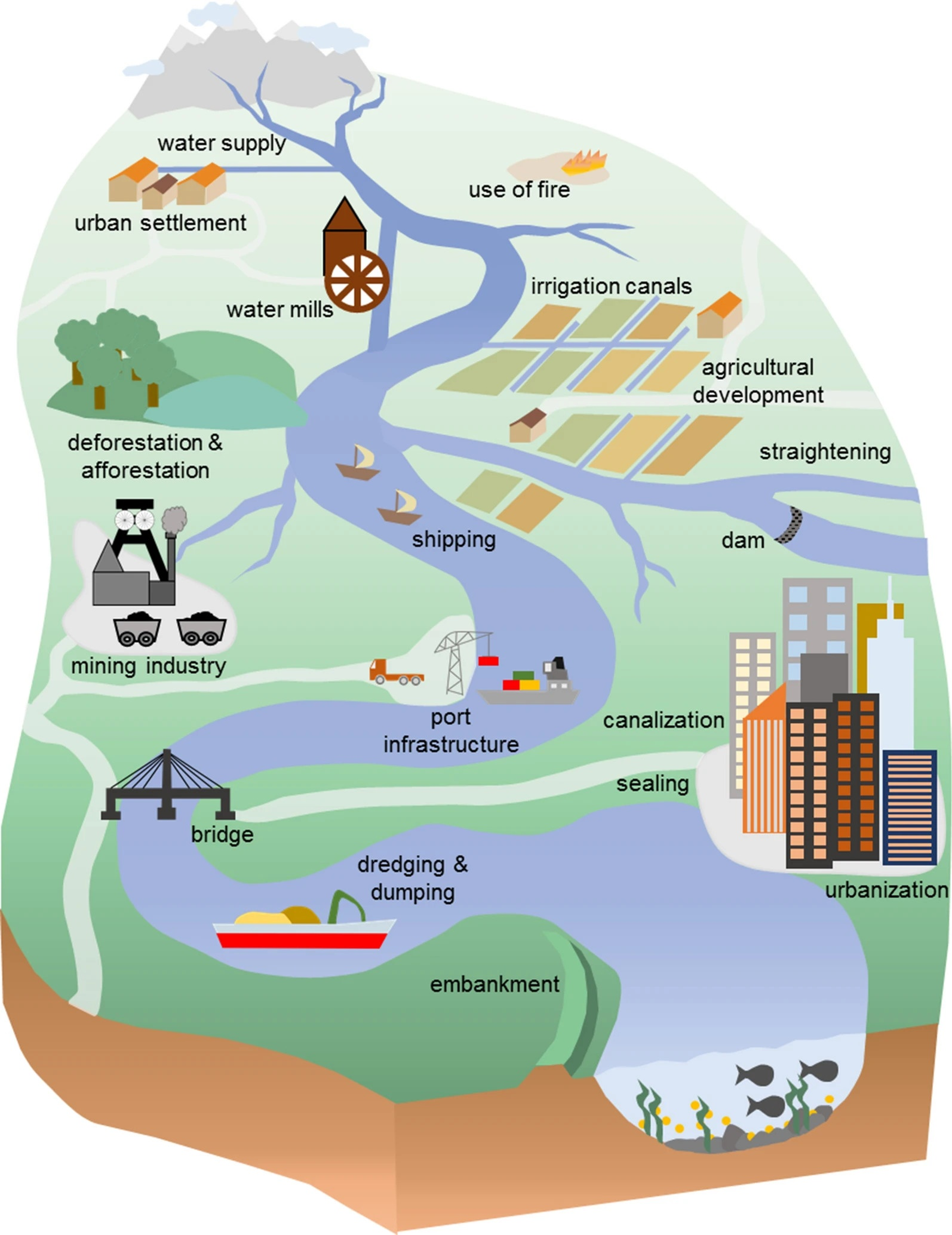
Anthropogenic influences on river systems. Examples are mainly from settings with a modest technological influence, especially in the period of about 10,000 to 4000 cal yr BP.

Humans exert a geomorphic force that now rivals that of the natural Earth. The period of human dominance has been termed the Anthropocene, and several dates have been proposed for its onset. Many researchers have emphasised the dramatic changes associated with the Industrial Revolution in Europe after about 1750 CE (Common Era) and the Great Acceleration in technology at about 1950 CE.

However, a detectable human imprint on the environment extends back for thousands of years, and an emphasis on recent changes minimises the enormous landscape transformation caused by humans in antiquity. Important earlier human effects with significant environmental consequences include megafaunal extinctions between 14,000 and 10,500 cal yr BP; domestication of plants and animals close to the start of the Holocene at 11,700 cal yr BP; agricultural practices and deforestation at 10,000 to 5000 cal yr BP; and widespread generation of anthropogenic soils at about 2000 cal yr BP. Key evidence of early anthropogenic activity is encoded in early fluvial successions, long predating anthropogenic effects that have intensified over the past centuries and led to the modern worldwide river crisis.

=== Pollution ===
River pollution can include but is not limited to: increasing sediment export, excess nutrients from fertilizer or urban runoff, sewage and septic inputs, plastic pollution, nano-particles, pharmaceuticals and personal care products, synthetic chemicals, road salt, inorganic contaminants (e.g., heavy metals), and even heat via thermal pollutions. The effects of pollution often depend on the context and material, but can reduce ecosystem functioning, limit ecosystem services, reduce stream biodiversity, and impact human health.

Pollutant sources of lotic systems are hard to control because they can derive, often in small amounts, over a very wide area and enter the system at many locations along its length. While direct pollution of lotic systems has been greatly reduced in the United States under the government's Clean Water Act, contaminants from diffuse non-point sources remain a large problem. Agricultural fields often deliver large quantities of sediments, nutrients, and chemicals to nearby streams and rivers. Urban and residential areas can also add to this pollution when contaminants are accumulated on impervious surfaces such as roads and parking lots that then drain into the system. Elevated nutrient concentrations, especially nitrogen and phosphorus which are key components of fertilizers, can increase periphyton growth, which can be particularly dangerous in slow-moving streams. Another pollutant, acid rain, forms from sulfur dioxide and nitrous oxide emitted from factories and power stations. These substances readily dissolve in atmospheric moisture and enter lotic systems through precipitation. This can lower the pH of these sites, affecting all trophic levels from algae to vertebrates. Mean species richness and total species numbers within a system decrease with decreasing pH.

=== Flow modification ===
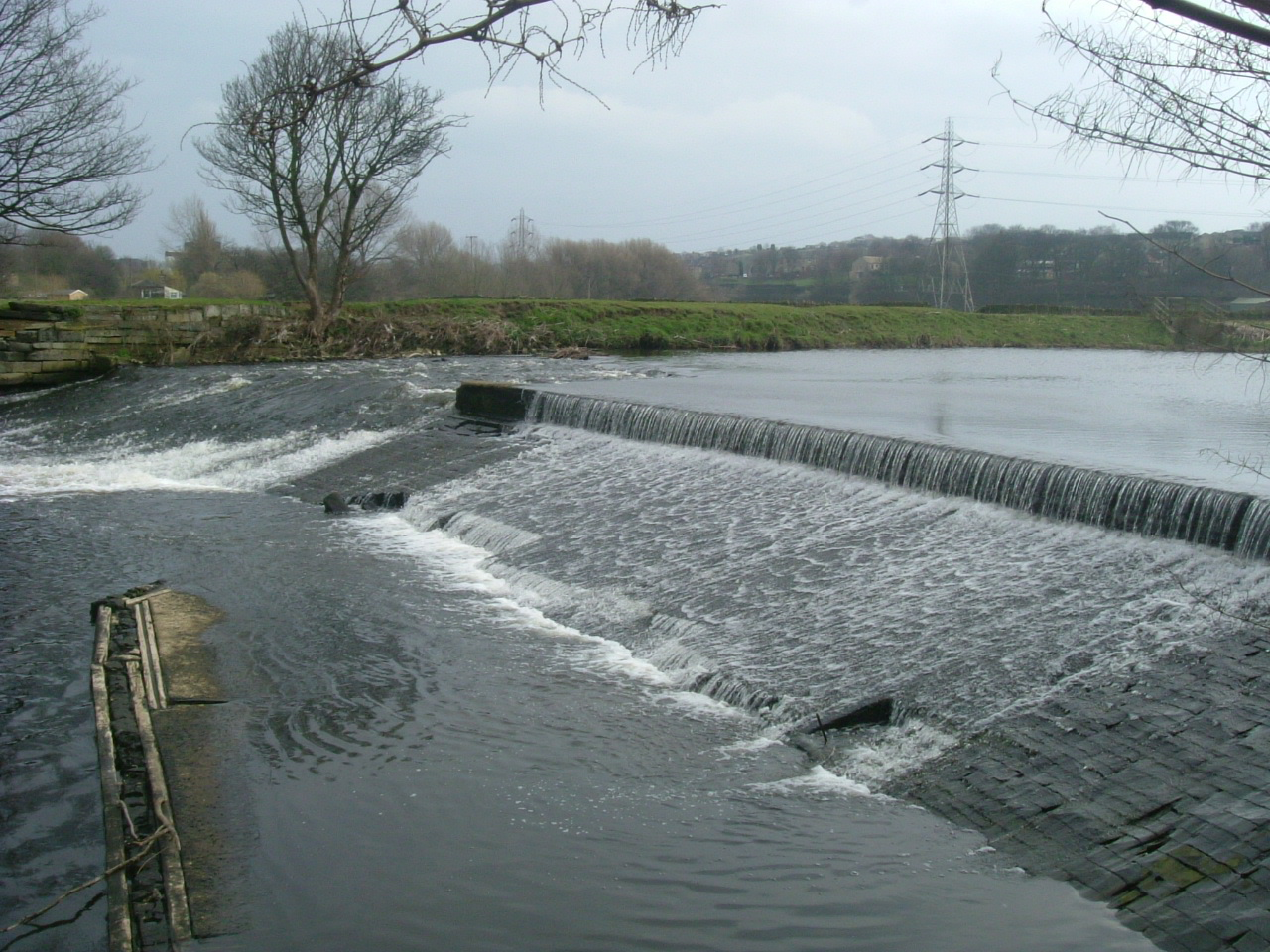
A weir on the River Calder, West Yorkshire

Flow modification can occur as a result of dams, water regulation and extraction, channel modification, and the destruction of the river floodplain and adjacent riparian zones.

Dams alter the flow, temperature, and sediment regime of lotic systems. Additionally, many rivers are dammed at multiple locations, amplifying the impact. Dams can cause enhanced clarity and reduced variability in stream flow, which in turn cause an increase in periphyton abundance. Invertebrates immediately below a dam can show reductions in species richness due to an overall reduction in habitat heterogeneity. Also, thermal changes can affect insect development, with abnormally warm winter temperatures obscuring cues to break egg diapause and overly cool summer temperatures leaving too few acceptable days to complete growth. Finally, dams fragment river systems, isolating previously continuous populations, and preventing the migrations of anadromous and catadromous species.

=== Invasive species ===
Invasive species have been introduced to lotic systems through both purposeful events (e.g. stocking game and food species) as well as unintentional events (e.g. hitchhikers on boats or fishing waders). These organisms can affect natives via competition for prey or habitat, predation, habitat alteration, hybridization, or the introduction of harmful diseases and parasites. Once established, these species can be difficult to control or eradicate, particularly because of the connectivity of lotic systems. Invasive species can be especially harmful in areas that have endangered biota, such as mussels in the Southeast United States, or those that have localized endemic species, like lotic systems west of the Rocky Mountains, where many species evolved in isolation.

== See also ==
- Betty's Brain – software that "learns" about river ecosystems
- Flood pulse concept
- Lake ecosystem
- Rheophile
- Riparian zone
- River continuum concept
- River drainage system
- RIVPACS
- The Riverkeepers
- Upland and lowland rivers
