= Flood pulse concept =

Concept in river ecology and hydrology

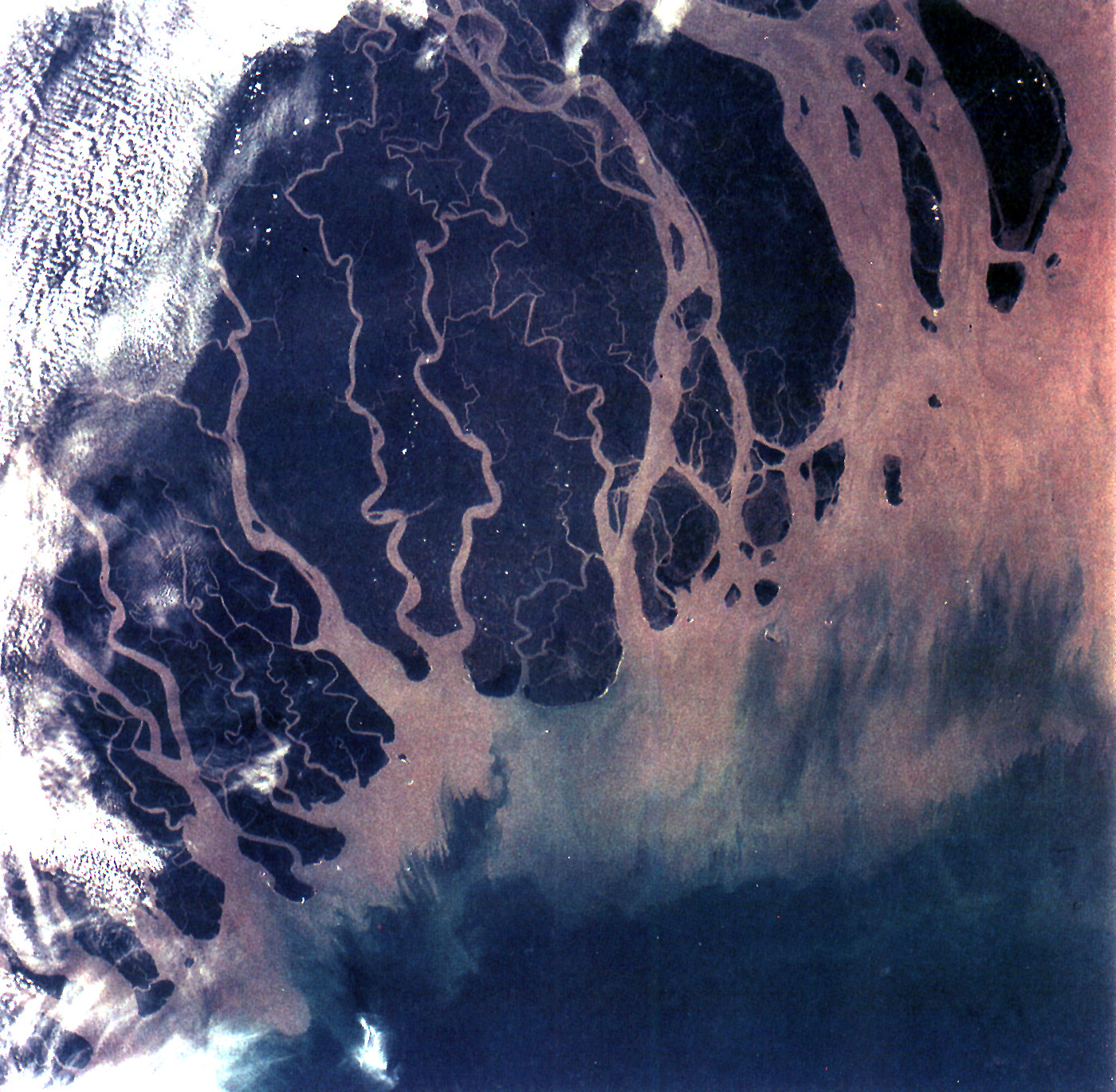
The Ganges River Delta, the largest intertidal delta in the world, is an example of river system exhibiting lentic and lotic characteristics that can be described by the flood pulse concept. As seen in this photograph, the tributaries and distributaries of the Ganges and Brahmaputra Rivers deposit huge amounts of silt and clay that create a shifting maze of waterways and islands in the Bay of Bengal.

The flood pulse concept explains how the periodic inundation and drought (flood pulse) control the lateral exchange of water, nutrients and organisms between the main river channel (or lake) and the connected floodplain. The annual flood pulse is the most important aspect and the most biologically productive feature of a river's ecosystem. describing the movement, distribution and quality of water in river ecosystems and the dynamic interaction in the transition zone between water and land (aquatic/terrestrial transition zones - ATTZ). It contrasts with previous ecological theories which considered floods to be catastrophic events.

== Background ==
River floodplain systems consist of an area surrounding a river that is periodically flooded by the overflow of the river as well as by precipitation, called the aquatic/terrestrial transition zone (ATTZ). The ATTZ is the area covered by water only during the flooding. This flooding in turn creates unique habitat that is essential to the survival of many different species. The flood pulse concept is unique because it incorporates the outlying rivers and streams which add a lateral aspect to previous concepts, e.g. the River Continuum Concept (RCC) that failed in explain processes that happen in big rivers and their floodplains. From this lateral perspective, rivers can be seen as a collection of width-based water systems.

Flooding consists of multiple stages. First, at the start of the flooding, nutrients rush in from the area where the flood begins. During flood periods, the most important element is called the moving littoral. As flooding begins and water levels increase nutrients that have been mineralized in the dry phase are suspended with sediments in the flood waters and main river. The moving littoral consists of the water from the shoreline to a few meters deep in the river. This pulse of water is the primary driver of high productivity and decomposition rates as it moves nutrients in and out of the system and is good breeding ground for many species of estuarial organisms. At this point in time production rates exceed decomposition rates. As water levels stabilize, decomposition rates outpace production rates, frequently contributing to dissolved oxygen deficiency. When the water starts receding, the moving littoral reverses, concentrating nutrients and contributing to phytoplankton growth.

== Living communities and flood types ==
The flood pulse helps maintain genetic and species diversity in the floodplain ecosystem, and it brings in oxygen to help fauna and decomposition. The flood pulse also increases yields by increasing the surface area of water and showers the land with river biota. Flood plain systems also serve as migration routes, hibernation spots, and spawning locations for many species. For the red-bellied piranha, their two annual reproductive seasons are dependent on the flooding pulse. However, the flood pulse has the potential to overpower some species; when flood pulses occur at unusual times or last for too long, terrestrial vegetation can be overwhelmed. Furthermore, the receding of the flood at the end of the flood pulse can lead to oxygen deficiency.

== Human impact ==
River floodplain systems can be both natural and man-made; the latter occur when dams and levees create a flood plain. Humans have had several effects on the flood pulse. Through ecosystem alterations such as dams, debris removal, channelization, levees, navigation, irrigation, contamination, logging, fire suppression, species introduction, and agricultural runoff, humans have contributed to the destruction of wetlands and the extinction of species. Biota relies on the flood plain for food supply, spawning and shelter, and flood pulses that are too quick or slow interrupt this. This can have devastating effects on riparian ecosystems.

== Criticisms and alternative concepts ==
The flood pulse concept is one of three primary models describing large river ecosystems. The others include the river continuum concept (RCC) and the serial discontinuity concept. Related theories include the nutrient spiraling concept. Many theorists have criticized the flood pulse concept and believe that other concepts could help explain the phenomena that occur in large rivers. Some say that the flood pulse concept is inadequate because it only applies to temperate and tropical systems. The flood pulse concept involves many assumptions; many theorists object to the concept on the basis of these assumptions. The flood pulse concept assumes that all systems are either hierarchical or linear, that physical features control biological structures, and that there is dynamic equilibrium between the biological and the physical rhythms. Because of their criticisms of the flood pulse concept, some theorists prefer the river continuum concept. However, Junk et al. argue that the river continuum concept is not sufficient because it is based on research done on small temperate streams and has mistakenly been applied to all water systems; furthermore, the river continuum concept does not explain habitats that fluctuate between lotic and lentic states, whereas the flood pulse concept adequately covers these systems.
