= River Continuum Concept =

Model for classifying and describing flowing water

The River Continuum Concept (RCC) is a model for classifying and describing flowing water, in addition to the classification of individual sections of waters after the occurrence of indicator organisms. The theory is based on the concept of dynamic equilibrium in which streamforms balance between physical parameters, such as width, depth, velocity, and sediment load, also taking into account biological factors. It offers an introduction to map out biological communities and also an explanation for their sequence in individual sections of water. This allows the structure of the river to be more predictable as to the biological properties of the water. The concept was first developed in 1980 by Robin L. Vannote, with fellow researchers at Stroud Water Research Center.

== Background of RCC ==
The River Continuum Concept is based on the idea that a watercourse is an open ecosystem that is in constant interaction with the bank, and moving from source to mouth, constantly changing. Basis for this change in the overall system is due to the gradual change of physical environmental conditions such as the width, depth, water, flow characteristics, temperature, and the complexity of the water. According to Vannote's hypothesis, which is based on the physical geomorphological theory, structural and functional characteristics of stream communities are selected to conform to the most probable position or mean state of the physical system. As a river changes from headwaters to the lower reaches, there will be a change in the relationship between the production and consumption (respiration) of the material (P/R ratio). The four scientists who collaborated with Dr. Vannote were Drs. G.Wayne Minshall (Idaho State University), Kenneth W. Cummins (Michigan State University), James R. Sedell (Oregon State University), and Colbert E. Cushing (Battelle-Pacific Northwest Laboratory). The group studied stream and river ecosystems in their respective geographical areas to support or disprove tenets of their original theory. The research resulted in the publication of 33 scientific papers (see attachment to Bibliography). The original 1980 paper received the John Martin Award from the Association for the Sciences of Limnology and Oceanography (formerly the American Society of Limnology and Oceanography) that recognizes papers still relevant ten years after their publication. Subsequent research related to the RCC by these scientists has resulted in several more scientific papers that amplify parts of the original RCC.

== Living communities and food types ==
The continuous differences of properties within the river are dependent primarily on the specific composition of the organisms in different sections of the water. Throughout the continuum of the river, the proportion of the four major food types; shredders, collectors, grazers (scrapers) and predators changes. With the exception of the predators, all these organisms feed directly from plant material (saprobes).

=== Shredders ===
Shredders are organisms that feed off of coarse particulate organic material (CPOM) such as small sections of leaves. They ingest the organic matter along with volunteer organisms (fungi, microorganisms) attached to the source. The preferred size of the CPOM is about one millimeter, therefore shredders must break it up into a finer particulate. In the process of shredding, much of the now finer organic matter is left in the system, making its way further downstream. Some common shredders of North American waters include scuds (Amphipoda), aquatic sowbugs (Isopoda), cranefly larvae (Tipulidae), some caddisfly larvae (Trichoptera, Integripalpia), and some stonefly larvae (Plecoptera), whereas Atyid shrimp (Atyidae) fulfill the same role in tropical environments.

=== Collectors ===
Collector organisms are designated by their use of traps or other adaptive features to filter and catch organic matter. The preferred particle size for collectors lies between 0.5 and 50 micrometers (UPOM = Ultrafine particulate organic matter and FPOM = fine particulate organic matter). This group includes some caddisflies (Trichoptera, Annulipalpia), fly larvae (Chironomidae and Simuliidae), nematodes, and many other animal groups.

=== Grazers ===
The grazers (scrapers) feed off of periphyton that accumulates on larger structures such as stones, wood or large aquatic plants. These include snails, caddisflies (Glossosoma genus), and other organisms.

Because of the structure of organic matter at different sections in a river, the make up and frequency of these groups in a community vary. In the upper reaches of a river, shredders and collectors make up a large percentage of total macroinvertebrates due to the excess presence of coarse plant matter. In the midreaches of a stream or river, where more light is available, there is an increase in the proportion of grazers due to the presence of periphyton. Shredders only make up a small percentage of the total invertebrates due to the lack of coarse organic matter making its way downstream. In the lower reaches, organic matter has been shredded completely to the level of FPOM or UPOM (Ultra-fine Particulate Organic Matter). Due to the increase in fine particulate organic matter, collectors are the most abundant in the lower reaches, feeding off organic matter and surface films. The proportion of predators in all sections remains largely constant and only changes in species composition. The reason for the even distribution is that predators are not dependent on the size of the organic matter but on the availability of prey animals in the area. Atypical changes in the composition of these groups of organisms within a watercourse, such as an increased number of choppers in a major river area (mid to lower reach) or a lack of these organisms in the upper reaches, suggest a possible disturbance.

== Division of the riverine ==
The River Continuum Concept assigns different sections of a river into three rough classifications. These classifications apply to all river waters, from small streams to medium-sized and large rivers and lakes.

=== Headwaters (Stream order 1 to 3) ===
The creek area in the upper reaches or headwaters of a water system is usually very narrow and lined by thick shore vegetation. This prevents the penetration of sunlight, in turn decreasing the production of organic material through photosynthesis in the water. The majority of the organic matter that does make its way into the system is in the form allochthonous plant material that falls into the river, such as leaves and sticks. In this section, respiration (consumption) out paces production (P/R<1). Here shredders play a major role in breaking down coarse plant material. In this area, the largest diversity of organic material can be expected.

=== Midreaches (Stream order 4-6) ===
In the midreaches of a river, river structures such as rocks and trees play an important role as a supplier of organic material such as periphyton and other autochthonous organic materials. The photosynthesis to respiration ratio is larger in this section and amounts to P: R> 1. The percentage of shredders in this area is less than that of the headwaters, due to lack of coarse plant particulate. Collectors and grazers make up a majority of the macro invertebrate structure in this area, with the predator's share remaining unchanged.

=== Lower reaches (Stream order >6) ===
In the lower reaches, there is a large flux in particulate material and also a decrease in production through photosynthesis, due to an increase in water cloudiness (turbidity) and surface film from suspended FPOM. Here, like the headwaters, respiration outpaces photosynthesis, making the ratio again less than 1 (P: R <1). The living community in these areas are made up of almost exclusively collectors, as well as a small share of predators.

== Contributing factors ==
The continuous changes down the water route are due to various factors. As described above, at its beginning, the river is very strongly influenced by material from outside the system, especially organic material which is consumed by various macroinvertebrates (mainly shredders). As you go further down the system there is an increase in autochthonous (i.e., within the system) production of organic material such as periphyton. The extent of this production varies depending on the amount of sunlight present. The last area is less dependent on the outside but still very much influenced by the degradation processes. In a continuous system without interference, such as by inflows, this development is possible in all river systems, with some variations occurring due to seasonal changes and other environmental factors (especially temperature).

== Resources and stability of the system ==
At any point in the system when organic material is added, it is used or stored, with a small proportion making its way further downstream. The existing energy is the limiting growth factor of the system, therefore the system is striving to be as efficient as possible. Free resources will enable new types of life in the community to establish, so that the excess resources are quickly exploited. This principle is not exclusively for river ecosystems but applies to most systems. Here, however, it plays a larger role, because resources are not spent in one place but are being constantly transported downstream.

The temporal aspect of this continuity can be seen by its daily and seasonal changes. In the course of a day there are many changes in the structure of living communities, mainly due to increased resource pressure during the day (better rate of detection) and abiotic factors such as changes of temperature and light. The midreaches are the most affected by daily periodic changes, because here there is the greatest biodiversity, each with different ideal conditions.

Because there is a uniform use of resources and high stability, disturbances and fluctuations are usually corrected relatively quickly. Inequalities in the use of resources will be quickly compensated for, creating a new equilibrium. Also, there is no ecological development of the system (succession) and changes in the system are a result of outside geological changes, such as a change in the level of water making its way into the system, change of organic inputs or earthquakes. Even after these changes, however, it returns to a steady and modified equilibrium. This ensures that the ecosystem stays as an optimal functioning river system.

== Development and application of the concept ==
The first comprehensive presentation of the 1980 concept was part of a two-day conference at Stroud Water Research Center, whose head director was Robin Vannote. It was the result of a multi-year study conducted by the Rockefeller Foundation. The publication of the hypothesis was released later that same year under the title "The River Continuum Concept" in the Canadian Journal of Fisheries and Aquatic Sciences. The concept built on the work of other American limnologists such as Ruth Patrick, from which the modern riverine ecosystem model has emerged, and Luna Leopold, which deals with the physical changes of water. The essential goal of the concept was to further assess and explain the various communities in the system. Vannote himself described the current situation as follows, "in those days, most people studied a square meter of water to death ”. Meaning that previous research was always only on small pieces of water and only rarely was the entire river system considered, allowing for the creation of a general model.

After its publication, the River Continuum Concept was adopted as the accepted model in the limnology community, becoming a favorite means for describing the communities living in flowing water. Here it broke the classic idea of riverine structure. Previous approaches had their disadvantages because they only described small zones of water and had no consideration for the system in its entirety.

In practice, the River Continuum Concept is used today mainly for environmental assessment of rivers. River studies that assess riverine biological communities and have determined the species composition of an area can then be compared with the ideal species composition from the River Continuum Concept. From there, any variations in species composition may shed light on disturbances that might be occurring to offset the system.

== Problems, limitations and modifications ==
Although the River Continuum Concept is a broadly accepted theory, it is limited in its applicability. It describes a perfect and even model without taking into account changing riverine disturbances and irregularities. Disturbances such as congestion by dams or natural events such as shore flooding are not included in the model.

Various researchers have since expanded the River Continuum Concept to account for such irregularities. For example, J.V. Ward and J.A. Stanford came up with the Serial Discontinuity Concept in 1983, which addresses the impact of geomorphologic disorders such as congestion and integrated inflows. The same authors presented the Hyporheic Corridor concept in 1993, in which the vertical (in depth) and lateral (from shore to shore) structural complexity of the river were connected. The flood pulse concept, developed by W.J. Junk in 1989, further modified by P.B. Bayley in 1990 and K. Tockner in 2000, takes into account the large amount of nutrients and organic material that makes its way into a river from the sediment of surrounding flooded land.

== Bibliography ==
Publications from the original RCC studies:

1. Vannote, R.L., G.W. Minshall, K.W. Cummins, J.R. Sedell, and C.E. Cushing. 1980. The river continuum concept. Can. J. Fish. Aquat. Sci. 37:130-137.

2. Bott, T.L., J.T. Brock, C.E. Cushing, S.V. Gregory, D. King, and R.C. Petersen. 1978. A comparison of methods for measuring primary productivity and community respiration in streams. Hydrobiologia 60:3-12.

3. Cummins, K.W. 1977. From headwater streams to rivers. Amer. Biol. Teacher 39:305-312.

4. Sedell, J.R., R.J. Naiman, K.W. Cummins, G.W. Minshall, and R.L. Vannote. 1978. Transport of particulate organic material in streams as a function of physical processes. Verh. Internat. Verein. Limnol. 20:1366-1375.

5. Naiman, R.J. and J.R. Sedell. 1979. Characterization of particulate organic matter transported by some Cascade Mountain streams. J. Fish. Res. Bd. Can. 36:17-31.

6. Moeller, J.R., G.W. Minshall, K.W. Cummins, R.C. Petersen, C.E. Cushing, J.R. Sedell, R.A. Larson, and R.L. Vannote. 1979. Transport of dissolved organic carbon in streams of differing physiographic characteristics. Organic Geochemistry 1:139-150.

7. Hendrickson, Jr., J.A. 1979. Analyses of species occurrences in community, continuum, and biomonitoring studies. In: G.P. Patil and M.L. Rosenzweig (eds.) Contemporary Quantitative Ecology and Related Ecometrics. Statistical Ecology Series Vol. 12, pp. 361–397.

8. Cushing, C.E., C.D. McIntire, J.R. Sedell, K.W. Cummins, G.W. Minshall, R.C. Petersen, and R.L. Vannote. 1980. Comparative study of physical-chemical variables of streams using multivariate analyses. Arch. Hydrobiol. 89:343-352.

9. Richey, J.E., J.T. Brock, R.J. Naiman, R.C. Wissmar, and R.F. Stallard. 1980. Organic carbon: oxidation and transport in the Amazon River. Science 207:1348-1351.

10. Naiman, R.J. and J.R. Sedell. 1979. Benthic organic matter as a function of stream order in Oregon. Arch. Hydrobiol. 87:404-432.

11. Naiman, R.J. and J.R. Sedell. 1980. Relationships between metabolic parameters and stream order in Oregon. Can. J. Fish. Aquat. Sci. 37:834-847.

12. Hawkins, C.P. and J.R. Sedell. 1981. Longitudinal and seasonal changes in functional organization of macroinvertebrate communities in four Oregon streams. Ecology 62:387-397.

13. Cummins, K.W., M.J. Klug, G.M. Ward, G.L. Spengler, R.W. Speaker, R.W. Ovink, D.C. Mahan, and R.C. Petersen. 1981. Trends in particulate organic matter fluxes, community processes and macroinvertebrate functional groups along a Great Lake Drainage Basin river continuum. Verh. Internat. Verein. Limnol. 21:841-849.

14. Vannote, R.L. 1981. The river continuum: a theoretical construct for analysis of river ecosystems. In: Proceed. Nat. Symp. on Freshwat. Inflow to Estuaries. Vol. 2. FWS/OBS-81/04. pp. 289–304.

15. Vannote, R.L. and G.W. Minshall. 1982. Fluvial processes and local lithology controlling abundance, structure, and composition of mussel beds. Proc. Natl. Acad. Sci. USA 79:4103-4107.

16. Cuffney, T.F. and G.W. Minshall. 1981. Life history and bionomics of Arctopsyche grandis (Trichoptera) in a central Idaho stream. Holarc. Ecol. 4:252-262.

17. Minshall, G.W., J.T. Brock, and T.W. LaPoint. 1982. Characterization and dynamics of benthic organic matter and invertebrate functional feeding group relationships in the Upper Salmon River, Idaho (USA). Int. Revue ges. Hydrobiol. 67:793-820.

18. Bruns, D.A., G.W. Minshall, J.T. Brock, C.E. Cushing, K.W. Cummins, and R.L. Vannote. 1982. Ordination of functional groups and organic matter parameters from the Middle Fork of the Salmon River, Idaho. Freshwat. Invertebr. Biol. 1:2-12.

19. Cushing, C.E., K.W. Cummins, G.W. Minshall, and R.L. Vannote. 1983. Periphyton, chlorophyll a and diatoms of the Middle Fork of the Salmon River, Idaho. Holarc. Ecol. 6:221-227.

20. Minshall, G.W., R.C. Petersen, K.W. Cummins, T.L. Bott, J.R. Sedell, C.E. Cushing, and R.L. Vannote. 1983. Interbiome comparison of stream ecosystem dynamics. Ecol. Mongr. 53:1-25.

21. Bott, T.L. 1983. Primary productivity in streams, pp. 29–53. In: J.R. Barnes and G.W. Minshall (eds.) Stream Ecology: application and testing of general ecological theory. Plenum Press, N.Y.

22. Cummins, K.W., J.R. Sedell, F.J. Swanson, G.W. Minshall, S.G. Fisher, C.E. Cushing, R.C. Petersen, and R.L. Vannote. 1983. Organic matter budgets for stream ecosystems: problems in their evaluation, pp. 299–353. In: J.R. Barnes and G.W. Minshall (eds.). Stream Ecology: application and testing of general ecological theory. Plenum Press, N.Y.

23. Bruns, D.A. and G.W. Minshall. 1983 Macroscopic models of community organization: analyses of diversity, dominance, and stability in guilds of predaceous stream insects, pp. 231–264. In: J.R. Barnes and G.W. Minshall (eds.). Stream Ecology: application and testing of general ecological theory. Plenum Press, N.Y.

24. Bruns, D.A., G.W. Minshall, C.E. Cushing, K.W. Cummins, J.T. Brock, and R.L. Vannote. 1984. Tributaries as modifiers of the river continuum concept: analysis by polar ordination and regression models. Arch. Hydrobiol. 99:208-220.

25. Cushing, C.E. and S.R. Rushforth. 1984, Diatoms of the Middle Fork of the Salmon River drainage with notes on their relative abundance and distribution. Great Basin Nat. 44:421-427.

26. Cushing, C.E., C.D. Mcintire, K.W. Cummins, G.W. Minshall, R.C. Petersen, J.R. Sedell and R.L. Vannote. 1983. Relationships among chemical, physical, and biological indices along river continua based on multivariate analyses. Arch. Hydrobiol. 98:317-326.

27. Minshall, G.W., R.C. Petersen, Jr., and C.F. Nimz. 1985. Species richness in streams of different size from the same drainage basin. Amer. Nat. 125:16-38.

28. Bott, T.L., J.T. Brock, C.S.Dunn, R.J. Naiman, R.W. Ovink, and R.C. Petersen. 1985. Benthic community metabolism in four temperate stream systems: An inter-biome comparison and evaluation of the river continuum concept. Hydrobiologia 123:3-45.

29. Minshall, G.W., K.W. Cummins, R.C. Petersen, C.E. Cushing, D.A. Bruns, J.R. Sedell, and R.L.Vannote. 1985. Developments in stream ecosystem theory. Can. J. Fish. Aquat. Sci. 42:1045-1055.

30. Bruns, D.A. and G.W. Minshall. 1985. River continuum relationships in an 8th-order river reach: Analysis of polar ordination, functional groups, and organic matter parameters. Hydrobiologia 127:277-285.

31. Bruns, D.A. and G.W. Minshall. 1986. Seasonal patterns in species diversity and niche parameters of lotic predator guilds. Arch. Hydrobiol. 106:395-419.

32. Bruns, D.A., A.B. Hale, and G.W. Minshall. 1987. Ecological correlates of species richness in three guilds of lotic macroinvertebrates. J. Freshwat. Ecol. 4:163-176.

33. Minshall, G.W., R.C. Petersen, T.L. Bott, C.E. Cushing, K.W. Cummins, R.L. Vannote, and J.R. Sedell. 1992. Stream ecosystem dynamics of the Salmon River, Idaho: an 8th-order system. J. N. Amer. Benthol. Soc. 11:111-137.
