= RIVPACS =

RIVPACS (River Invertebrate Prediction and Classification System) is an aquatic biomonitoring system for assessing water quality in freshwater rivers in the United Kingdom. It is based on the macroinvertebrate species (such as freshwater shrimp, freshwater sponges, worms, crayfish, aquatic snails, freshwater mussels, insects, and many others) found at the study site during sampling. Some of these species are tolerant to pollution, low dissolved oxygen, and other stressors, but others are sensitive; organisms vary in their tolerances. Therefore, different species will usually be found, in different proportions, at different river sites of varying quality. Some organisms are especially good indicator species. The species found at the reference sites collectively make up the species assemblage for that site and are the basis for a statistical comparison between reference sites and non-reference sites. The comparison between the expected species and the observed species can then be used to estimate this aspect of the ecological health of a river.

The system is meant to be standardized, easy to use, and relatively low cost. It can complement other types of water quality monitoring such as chemical monitoring. RIVPACS supports the implementation of the Water Framework Directive as its official tool for macroinvertebrate classification

Reference sites can be chosen and adjusted several ways. Usually they represent the best conditions within the region or area under study, and are a short stretch of river. Sometimes the reference site expectations are adjusted for degradation of the entire region by human impact. 'Pristine' freshwater sites are sampled to collect information on physical characteristics, chemistry, and macroinvertebrates, sometimes several times each year. This information is then used to predict what invertebrates are present from samples of physiochemistry from other sites.

RIVPACS is used across the UK and supported by Centre for Ecology and Hydrology, Countryside Council for Wales, Department for Environment, Food and Rural Affairs, Natural England, Environment Agency, Northern Ireland Environment Agency, Freshwater Biological Association, Scotland and Northern Ireland Forum for Environmental Research, Scottish Environment Protection Agency, Scottish Government, Scottish Natural Heritage, South West Water, and Welsh Assembly Government.

This classification of freshwater sites based on the macroinvertebrate fauna was first derived in 1977. Since then it has been developed and updated with addition of a wider range of freshwater sites. It has been adapted into various other versions around the world, including a Canadian version known as CABIN, AUSRIVAS in Australia, MEDPACS in Spain, and others.
