= Philadelphia Society for the Promotion of Agriculture =

Organization to promote best practices in agriculture

Philadelphia Society for Promoting Agriculture
- Formation: March 1, 1785; 241 years ago
- Founder: John Beale Bordley
- Type: Nonprofit
- Tax ID no.: 23-6290453
- Purpose: Agriculture
- Headquarters: Philadelphia, PA
- President: Jessica McAtamney

The Philadelphia Society for Promoting Agriculture (originally known as the Philadelphia Society for the Promotion of Agriculture, PSPA), formally established on March 1, 1785, was the first American organization to focus exclusively on the reform of agricultural practices in the United States. It is a nonpartisan organization, and a registered charitable nonprofit (501(c)(3)) The president as of July 1, 2024, is Jessica McAtamney.

The idea of forming such a group was proposed to the American Philosophical Society by John Beale Bordley. Of the PSPA's twenty-three founding members, seven belonged to the American Philosophical Society, and four were signers of the United States Declaration of Independence. The society held its first election on March 29, 1785. The officers elected were Samuel Powel (president), John Beale Bordley (vice-president), Tench Francis (treasurer), and Timothy Pickering (secretary).

Activities of the society were somewhat intermittent, being disrupted by external events such as the 1793 Philadelphia yellow fever epidemic, the War of 1812, and the American Civil War. The society's members have contributed to scientific debates on agricultural topics, the promotion of new agricultural practices such as the use of crop rotation and fertilizers, and the detection and eradication of bovine tuberculosis. The society has been instrumental in the creation of other organizations and institutions such as agricultural fairs, the Farmer's Club, the Pennsylvania State Agricultural Society, and the Farmers' High School (which became Pennsylvania State University). The United States Department of Agriculture (USDA) credits PSPA as one of "the seeds sown which later sprouted and grew into the USDA".

== Leadership and initiatives ==
=== The Georgic farmers ===
The original members have been variously described as "gentleman farmers" or "Georgic farmers". Many owned large farmlands, but farming was not their sole interest. Members like Benjamin Franklin, George Washington and Thomas Jefferson saw agriculture as an important area of practice affecting both the economy of the state and the morality of its citizens. Bringing together agriculture, commerce and science, they viewed agricultural business practices and economic investment as foundational to the formation of an independent United States. In a scholarly approach to agriculture, they sought to combine traditional knowledge, practical hands-on experience, and the expansion of scientific knowledge through systematic procedures and experiments. Members such as Richard Peters and James Mease reported on their practical agriculture experience, experiments, and the relevance of chemical theories.

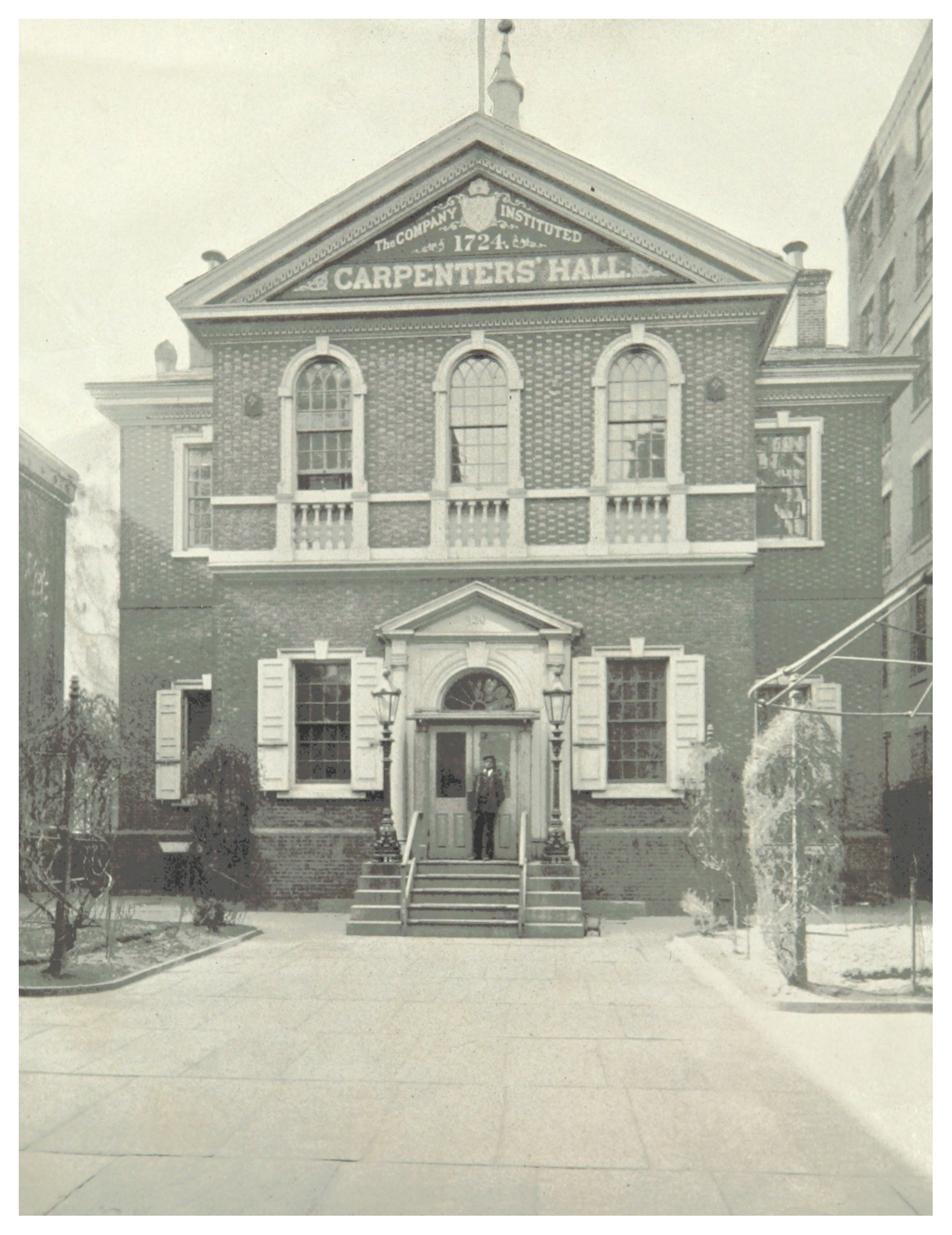
Carpenters' Hall, 1897

The society held monthly meetings in Carpenters' Hall, near Third and Chestnut Streets. Activities of the society reflected the interests of its members, who dealt with a variety of issues at different times. The society initially reflected the agricultural reform movement, with the goals of increasing agricultural knowledge and the production of agricultural goods for general consumption, beyond the use of farm families. Members such as Richard Peters, George Logan, and John Beale Bordley experimented on their own farms, and are credited with promoting the use of fertilizers such as plaster and gypsum, and the practice of crop rotation. As well as research and education, the society's stated goals included the awarding of prizes and support for the creation of other related societies.

In some cases, differences of opinion (as well as political and economic interests) led to divisions and the formation of organizations such as George Logan's Philadelphia County Society for Promoting Agriculture (1788). The PSPA's activities were interrupted between 1793 and 1805 due to the yellow fever epidemic and the resulting deaths of president Samuel Powel and others in 1793.

=== Richard Peters ===
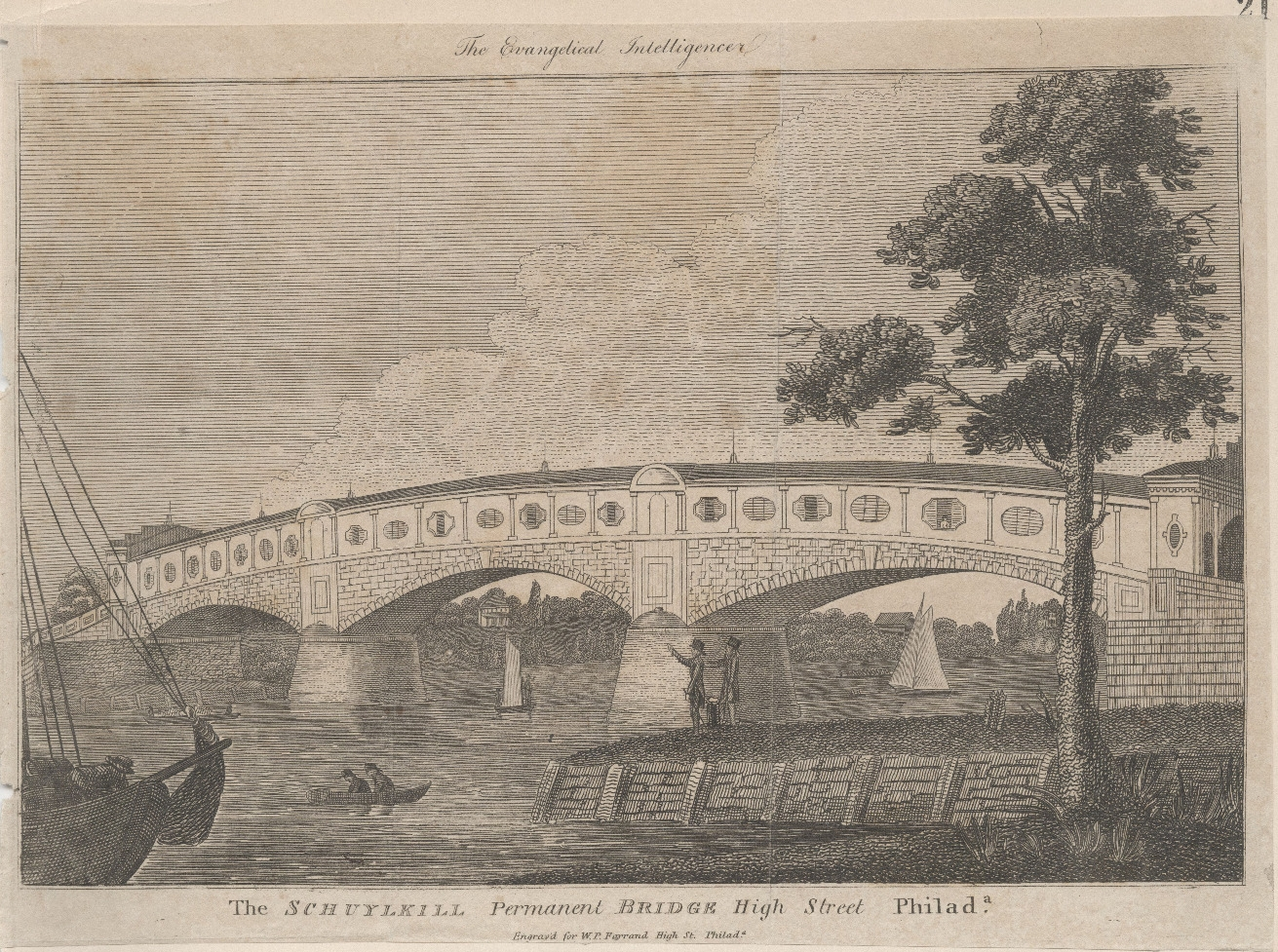
Covered Permanent Bridge, Schuylkill River, Philadelphia

As early as 1786, members of the society discussed the possibility of bridging the Schuylkill River. They planned to petition the Pennsylvania General Assembly for funding. PSPA member Richard Peters successfully lobbied for An Act to authorize the Governor of this Commonwealth to incorporate a Company, for erecting a Permanent Bridge over the Schuylkill River, at or near the City of Philadelphia. This was passed on March 16, 1798, and a company was formed to carry out the project, with Peters as its president. The bridge's piers were designed by engineer William Weston, while the 550-foot wooden superstructure was built by Timothy Palmer. The Permanent Bridge took five years to complete, and opened for use on January 1, 1805. It was later covered over. It was the first major bridge to cross the Schuylkill River, one of the earliest major river bridges in America and the first of them to be covered.

On April 9, 1805, the Philadelphia Society for the Promotion of Agriculture was formally reestablished with the election of new officers, "it appearing that the President and Vice President are dead, the members present being a quorum to constitute a regular meeting for the transaction of business." Richard Peters was unanimously elected as president. The society celebrated the building of the Permanent Bridge by erecting a commemorative obelisk, which included a sundial, an equation table, the monument's latitude and longitude, a compass, and a "mix of prose and verse".

How to share knowledge was a major challenge for the society. Lack of an agricultural press was a barrier until the 1820s. Published papers and communications on topics such as the Hessian fly, farm equipment, crop rotation, and dairy farming appeared intermittently in a variety of publications. The society had limited funding and found it difficult to cover the costs of publication; the quality of submissions was highly variable; and progressive agricultural publications had a small readership. Nonetheless, under Richard Peters, the society published five volumes of Memoirs of the Philadelphia Society for Promoting Agriculture between 1808 and 1826. The first volume was published by a woman printer, Jane Aitken. A sixth volume appeared over a century later, in 1939.

In addition to monthly meetings, the society gave presentations, awarded prizes, and sponsored agricultural fairs. It held its first agricultural exhibition in 1822, attracting visitors to view cattle, farm products, and machinery. The society was involved in testing and distribution of seeds and plants, and published an agricultural almanac between 1816 and 1829.

One of many suggested initiatives that was proposed but lacked funding was an experimental farm. Philadelphia physician Benjamin Rush, a founder of the nation's first medical school at the University of Pennsylvania, suggested that provisions be made to create a chair of veterinary medicine. Rush's idea was far ahead of its time: only in 1882 did University Trustee Joshua Ballinger Lippincott donate money for a veterinary school.

Richard Peters died on August 22, 1828. The society's records were not well-preserved during the early 1800s: the society apparently became inactive again prior to 1838.

=== Nicholas Biddle ===
The War of 1812 may have disrupted activity of the society. The period between 1810 and 1850 saw major changes to American infrastructure. Improvements to roads, canals and railroads made it easier for farmers' produce to reach markets, while the telegraph, newspapers and magazines increased their access to information. One of the papers given by James Mease reported on the transmission patterns of Texas fever as cattle were moved north from South Carolina.

In 1838, the Farmer's Cabinet, which began publication in 1832, reported that the Society for Promoting Agriculture had been revived with the election of Nicholas Biddle as president. The 1840s are described as an active time for the society, with meetings, lectures and exhibitions. In 1847 the Farmer's Club was organized as an adjunct group.

=== Frederick Watts ===
On February 6, 1850, the Philadelphia Society for Promoting Agriculture proposed that a Farmers' Convention be held in Harrisburg in 1851, with delegates from each county in Pennsylvania, to form a State Agricultural Society. Frederick Watts, a member of the PSPA, became the founding president of the Pennsylvania State Agricultural Society (PSAS).

In 1853-4 PSPA lost access to the locations where they had held their exhibitions, interfering with their activities. In 1855 the location of their meetings was changed.

Nonetheless, the PSPA and the PSAS successfully lobbied the Pennsylvania state legislature to form the Farmers' High School, chartered on February 22, 1855. It was later renamed the Agricultural College of Pennsylvania and subsequently became Pennsylvania State University.

Tensions in the American states came to a head during the American Civil War which lasted from April 12, 1861, to May 26, 1865. Members of the PSPA may have held differing views about the war and the issues behind it; in any case, the war became a major focus during that time. By 1861, the PSPA had become largely inactive.

=== Leonard Pearson ===
In 1888, the society's original papers were given to the University of Pennsylvania. In 1909, Leonard Pearson, Dean of the School of Veterinary Medicine at the University of Pennsylvania, found the records of the society in the university library. He contacted surviving members to form a quorum to restart the Philadelphia Society for Promoting Agriculture. Sadly, Pearson died on September 20, 1909, before the quorum met. He was elected posthumously as a member of the society in 1938.

Pearson, who also held the position of state veterinarian, was the first person in the United States to use tuberculin as a diagnostic agent for the detection of bovine tuberculosis, on March 16, 1892. Bovine tuberculosis is a zoonotic disease that can "jump" from animals to humans. Potentially deadly, it can be transmitted to humans through the consumption of unpasteurized milk. Pearson's "Pennsylvania Plan" for tuberculin testing was approved by the United States Bureau of Animal Industry, and adopted by the United States Livestock Sanitary Association for use by various federal, state and local officials between 1901 and 1917.

After Pearson's death, other members of the society carried on his work, appealing for research and action on bovine tuberculosis during the 1920s and 30s. Their goal was the eradication of bovine tuberculosis within the United States. The first county-wide tuberculin test was applied across the state of Pennsylvania in 1923. From 1923 to 1950, the tuberculosis incidence in Pennsylvania diary and breeding cattle was reduced from 9.29 per cent to 0.9 per cent. By 2011, the 93-year-long effort for the voluntary identification and slaughter of affected animals had decreased disease prevalence to <0.001%, an impressive achievement in public health and education.

In the 1940s, the PSPA began to hold its monthly lunch meetings at the Union League of Philadelphia.

=== Mark Allam ===
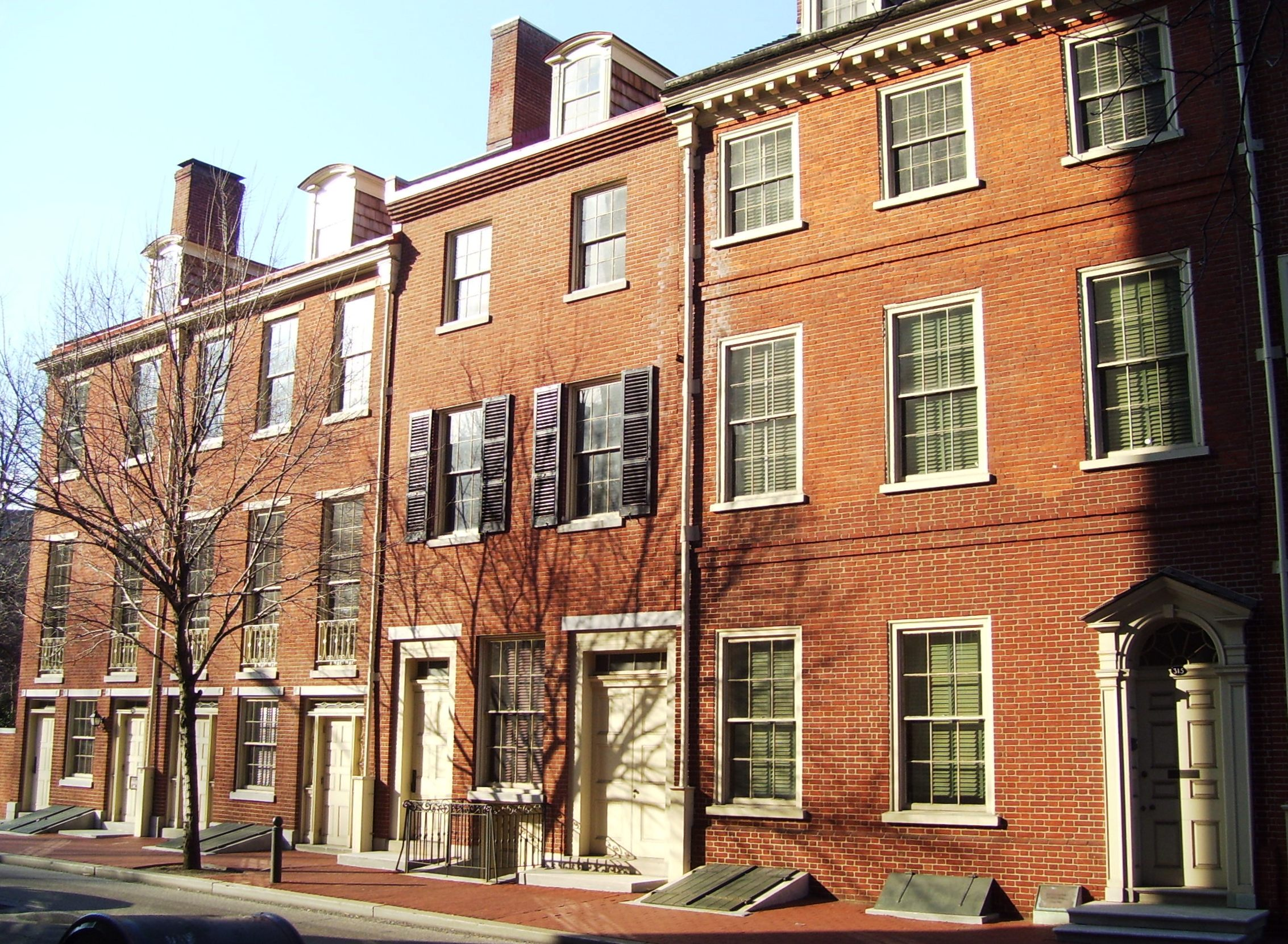
The Kidd Houses, 319-325 Walnut Street

In 1954, Mark Allam became a member of the society. He worked with Hardie Scott and others to include the PSPA in the reconstruction of Independence National Historical Park and the renewal of Old City, Philadelphia. As a result, PSPA and the Pennsylvania Horticultural Society became joint tenants of 323-5 Walnut Street for a rent of $100 per month and care of the gardens. The three-story brick row houses at 319-321 and 323-325 Walnut Street were built by Robert Kidd in 1810 and 1812, and taken over by the National Park Service in 1951.

=== Technological change ===
Following the end of World War II, the development of high-yield grains supported a Green Revolution with dramatic changes in agricultural practice. These included large-scale food production by agribusiness, use of pesticides, monoculture, and reliance on international supply chains. Society members such as dairyman Henry W. Jeffers, seedsman David Burpee, members of the Seabrook family, and Stuart Younkin of Campbell's were part of this transition.

By the end of the 20th century, there were counter-movements such as the Slow Food movement for eating organically and locally; the rediscovery of genetically diverse heirloom crops; and urban gardening and farming. Diverse audiences with a wide variety of experiences and viewpoints met at the monthly meetings of the society.

=== 21st century ===
The PSPA is a non-profit, non-partisan organization. It promotes sustainable agriculture through presentations, monthly meetings and field trips. The membership includes farmers, environmentalists, universities, research institutions, government and agriculturally related businesses. In 2024, the PSPA partnered with Michael Sklaroff and the PA Bipartisan Climate Initiative in support of Pennsylvania's environmental rights amendment.

== Awards ==
The society followed the model of European societies in awarding medals. On August 1, 1785, the Philadelphia Society for Promoting Agriculture formed a committee to order a gold medal to be struck. On September 5, 1785, the committee determined that the medal was to be made locally, in America, and to feature industry and plenty. On January 2, 1786, the proposed motto was changed from "Interest Omnium" to "Venerate the plough." This first gold medal was presented to Col. George Morgan of Princeton, New Jersey on February 7, 1786.

Later recipients preferred American cash to an actual medal. The first premium to be offered by the society was a two hundred dollar prize for the best experiment in crop rotation, in 1791. One of the members who submitted a paper was George Logan. Logan reported on years of experiments in crop rotation and the use of fertilizers, carried out on his farm between 1784 and 1791. However, members of the PSPA who favored "the English method of farming" dismissed the report, even as they admitted it had "considerable merit". Logan published his results in the Independent Gazetteer (Feb. 26 and Mar. 5, 1791), the Columbian Magazine (II, 1791, pp. 162–168); the National Gazette (May 3, 1792) and as a pamphlet, Fourteen Agricultural Experiments, to Ascertain the Best Rotation of Crops (Philadelphia, 1797). Logan left the PSPA, and formed the competing Philadelphia County Society for Promoting Agriculture in 1788.

Another recipient was Benjamin Rush, who received the gold medal in 1806, in response to a call for the "best essay and plan for promoting veterinary knowledge." Gold medal recipients from 1932 to 2021 are listed on the society's website. The first woman to receive the Gold Medal was Ruth Patrick in 1975. Recent recipients include Russell Redding and Thomas Vilsak (2015), and MeeCee Baker (2017).

== Historical records ==
The society's bylaws were published in 1789. The society's original papers and its library of over 1,000 works from the 16th to the 19th centuries are held by the University of Pennsylvania to which they were donated in 1888. In 1988, the Pew Trust and others established a conservation fund to support preservation of the society's early manuscript materials.

The society published its first volume of the Memoirs of the Philadelphia Society for Promoting Agriculture in 1808, the fifth volume in 1826, and a sixth volume in 1939. The sixth volume was largely a reprint of earlier manuscripts and images, organized by John M. Okie and others.

From 1985 to 1996, Stuart Younkin oversaw the publication of the Proceedings of the Philadelphia Society for Promoting Agriculture, with financial support from William Beverly Murphy. After Murphy's death, print publication ceased. Younkin then created an institutional website and served as its editor from 1998 to 2001. He also served as president for the 1987–88 year.

George Blight presented a historical review of the society in 1885, published as One Hundred Years Ago: A Paper Read on the Occasion of the Centennial Anniversary of the Philadelphia Society for the Promotion of Agriculture. A Sketch of the history of the Philadelphia society for Promoting Agriculture, prepared for the celebration of the 150th anniversary of its foundation was written by Rodney H. True for the society's 150th anniversary in 1935. It was republished in volume 6 of the society's memoirs, in 1939. In 1959, horticulture professor Stevenson Whitcomb Fletcher published The Philadelphia Society for Promoting Agriculture, 1785-1955, a brief account of the society and its fairs and activities. It was reprinted in 1979. A short history of the organization, titled Venerate the Plough, was published to mark the organization's bicentennial in 1985. In 2012, Elizabeth A. Mosimann published Promoting Agriculture in a Changing World: 225 Years of the Philadelphia Society for Promoting Agriculture, 1785-2010. Her work extends the history of the society into the 20th century.

== Inclusion of women ==
Women were not accepted as members of the Philadelphia Society for Promoting Agriculture until the 1990s. The only exception was Elizabeth Coleman White. She was made an honorary member in 1934, when she received the society's Distinguished Certificate (not the gold medal) for her work developing blueberry cultivars. That her inclusion was unusual is made clear by statements made in 1939. A possible woman member was dismissed with the comment "It is unfortunate that we have a prejudice against women members in our Society. However, I believe the Society will be well-served by naming her husband to membership."

The next woman to be formally recognized by the society, and the first one to receive the gold medal, was Ruth Patrick in 1975. Patrick was well known for her work at the Academy of Natural Sciences.

Jane Pepper, head of the Pennsylvania Horticultural Society, addressed the PSPA in 1994 but was not eligible at that time to become a member. She was finally allowed to join PSPA in 1998.

The first woman to become a president of the society was Page Roberts Gowen, 2002–2003. The second woman to be president was Marilyn Horner, 2008–2009.

The second woman to receive the Gold Medal was MeeCee Baker in 2017. Baker was the first woman to be elected president of the National Association of Agricultural Educators.

== Membership ==
=== Founding members ===
The founding group of twenty-three members were from the Philadelphia area. These men had common connections through business and familial ties; many owned substantial agricultural properties. A number were Quakers.

- John Beale Bordley: "The Vineyards", Wye Island, Como Farm (Pennsylvania)
- Samuel Powel (married Elizabeth Willing, sister of Thomas Willing)
- Thomas Willing (brother-in-law of Samuel Powel)
- Robert Morris, (junior partner of Thomas Willing in "Willing and Morris"), "The Hills"
- Colonel John Nixon (connected by marriage to the Morris family)
- George Clymer (married Elizabeth Meredith, sister of Samuel Meredith)
- Samuel Meredith (brother-in-law of George Clymer and Henry Hill)
- Henry Hill (married Anne Meredith, sister of Samuel Meredith; brother-in-law of Richard Wells)
- Richard Wells (married Rachel Hill, sister of Henry Hill)
- John Cadwalader (brother-in-law of Philemon Dickinson)
- Lambert Cadwalader (brother-in-law of Philemon Dickinson)
- Philemon Dickinson (married Mary Cadwalader, sister of John and Lambert Cadwalader)
- Edward Shippen IV (married Margaret Francis, sister of Tench Francis)
- Tench Francis (brother-in-law of Edward Shippen IV)
- John Jones (Doctor)
- Adam Kuhn (Doctor)
- George Logan (Doctor)
- Benjamin Rush (Doctor)
- Charles Thomson, "Harriton"
- Samuel Vaughan
- George Morgan
- Richard Peters
- James Wilson

=== Presidents ===
Early presidents of the society include:

- Samuel Powel, 1785-1793
- Richard Peters, 1805-1828
- Nicholas Biddle, 1838-1844
- James Mease, 1844-1846
- Algernon S. Roberts
- James Gowen
- Edward Elwyn
- David Landreth Jr., co-founder of the Pennsylvania Horticultural Society (PHS), multiple terms, including 1854 and 1856.
- Aaron Clement
- Craig Biddle
- William Heyward Drayton
- Charles R. King, 1885

For presidents of the society after 1909, see Mosimann. As of 1983, the position of president became a one-year position and the position of secretary increased in importance for the ongoing management of the society.

- Mark Allam, 1962-1966
- Stuart Younkin, 1987–88.
- Page Roberts Gowen, 2002–2003, first woman president.
- Marilyn Horner, 2008–2009.

=== Additional members ===
Initially members were divided into two classes: full members who lived within a 10-mile radius of Philadelphia, and honorary members who lived farther away. This restriction was later removed. The many members of the society include:

- Timothy Pickering Elected March 22, 1785.
- Elias Boudinot (honorary) Elected April 27, 1785
- George Washington (honorary) Elected July 4, 1785.
- Henry Wynkoop (honorary) Elected July 4, 1785.
- Benjamin Franklin Elected November 7, 1785.
- Thomas Paine Elected February 7, 1786.
- William Bingham Elected February 5, 1787.
- Reuben Haines Elected 1810.
- Roberts Vaux
- Charles Willson Peale
- Hardie Scott Elected 1993.
