= John Hannum III =

American businessman and soldier (1744–1799)

- Born: 1744; Concord Township, Chester County, Pennsylvania
- Died: February 7, 1799 (aged 55); West Chester, Pennsylvania
- Occupations: Politician, colonial militia officer, businessman
- Spouse: Alice Parke
- Children: 9

John Hannum III (1744 – February 2, 1799), also known as Col. John Hannum was a politician, businessman and colonial militiaman in Chester County, Pennsylvania influential in the establishment of West Chester, Pennsylvania as the county seat. His grandfather was an early settler in Pennsylvania, perhaps immigrating as early as 1682.

== War years ==
While a colonel in 1st Battalion of Chester County Militia, John Hannum and his friend and brother-in-law Thomas Cheyney achieved a certain fame in identifying and notifying George Washington of the movement of British troops under the command of General William Howe across the Brandywine River at Trimble's Ford in their march past Jefferis Ford toward the Battle of the Brandywine.

Later he was taken captive by the British and held prisoner in Philadelphia until his escape (see his letter to George Washington describing this ordeal).

He was a delegate from Chester County to the State Convention for Ratifying the Constitution of the United States.

== Politician/Businessman ==
In 1784, Hannum, among others, was selected to build a new Court House and Prison for the County of Chester in a location within one and a half miles from the Turk's Head Tavern. This came to be the Borough of West Chester. The residents of the town of Chester (the previous site of the county seat) were opposed to this change and potential altercation was narrowly avoided through the influence of John Hannum as described in the "History of Chester County, Pennsylvania: with genealogical and biographical sketches":

The non-removalists, having passed the night at the ‘Gen. Greene,’ made their appearance near the Turk’s Head early in the morning and took their ground about two hundred yards southeast of the present Quaker meeting-house. Here they planted their cannon and made preparations for the attack. They seemed, however, when everything was ready, still reluctant to proceed to extremities: and having remained several hours in a hostile position, an accommodation was effected between the parties by the intervention of some pacific people, who used their endeavors to prevent the effusion of blood. To the non-removalists was conceded the liberty of inspecting the defenses that had been prepared by their opponents, on condition that they should do them no injury; and they on their part agreed to abandon their design, and to return peaceably to their homes. The cannon, which had been pointed against the walls, was turned in another direction and fired in celebration of the treaty. Col. Hannum then directed his men to leave the court-house, and having formed in a line a short distance to the right, to ground their arms, and wait till the other party should have finished their visit to the building. Here, an act of indiscretion had nearly brought on a renewal of hostilities, for one of Maj. Harper’s men having entered the fort, struck down the flag which their opponents had raised upon the walls. Highly incensed at this treatment of their standard, the removalists snatched up their arms and were, with difficulty, prevented from firing upon the major and his companions. Some exertion, however, on the part of the leaders allayed the irritation of the men, and the parties at length separated amicably without loss of life or limb.

A burlesque ditty written to ridicule the inhabitants of Chester over this event and titled "Lament Over Chester’s Mother" ends with the following lines:

Oh, may Jack Hannum quickly die,
And die in grievous pain,
Be sent into eternity,
That mamma may remain!

May all his projects fail likewise,
That we may live again!
Then everyone rolled up his eyes,
And cried aloud, "Amen!"

Previous to the construction of the new court-house he purchased the adjacent property where:

He built the old Washington Hotel, on High street, with only a narrow alley between it and the Court House; with a view to secure the patronage of the Judges to the hotel, he projected a kind of gallery, or passageway, from the second story across the alley into the Hall of Justice, for the accommodation of their Honors: and even went so far toward effecting an opening as to remove some stones from the Court House wall, – when the County Commissioners mustered enough courage to forbid further operations.

From 1793 till his death in 1799 Hannum was Register of Wills and Recorder of Deeds of Chester County.

The Col. John Hannum House is listed on the National Register of Historic Places.

Hannum Ave. in West Chester (leading from the center of town to Strasburg Rd) was named for him.
