= Humphry Marshall House =

Historic house in Pennsylvania, United States

- U.S. National Register of Historic Places
- U.S. National Historic Landmark
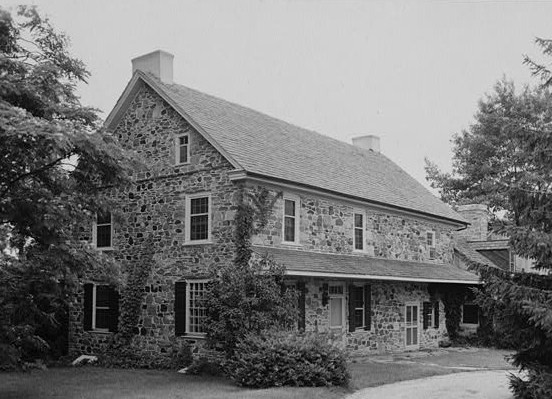
- HABS photo, July 1958

- Location within Pennsylvania
- Location: 1407 Strasburg Road, Marshallton, Pennsylvania
- Coordinates: 39°57′2″N 75°40′53.5″W
- Built: 1773–74
- Architect: Humphry Marshall
- Architectural style: Georgian
- NRHP reference No.: 71000695, 87002596

Significant dates
- Added to NRHP: May 27, 1971
- Designated NHL: December 23, 1987

The Humphry Marshall House, also historically known as Marshall's Garden, Marshall's Arboretum, and the Botany Farm, is a historic property in Marshallton, an unincorporated village in West Bradford Township, Chester County, Pennsylvania. Built in 1773–74, the house is a good example of an 18th-century Pennsylvania country house, which is most notable as the home of early American botanist Humphry Marshall (1722–1801). The property was also where Marshall established one of the first botanical gardens in what is now the United States. The house was documented by the Historic American Buildings Survey (HABS) in July 1958. It was listed on the National Register of Historic Places on May 27, 1971, and was designated a National Historic Landmark on December 23, 1987. The property is now privately owned; the gardens have declined since Marshall's time, but its basic layout has survived.

== Description and history ==
The Humphry Marshall House stands on about 2.5 acres (1.0 ha) on the west side of Marshalltown, on the north side of Strasburg Road at its junction with Clayton Road. The house is set well back from the road, from which it is screened by mature plantings of the garden space. The house is 2 1/2 stories in height, and is built out of locally quarried limestone that has an ashlar finish. It is nominally five bays wide, but the bays on the ground floor are irregularly spaced, and not all of the bays on the second floor have windows. A single-story shed-roof porch extends across the front facade. There are two entrances, one a standard entry, the other a shorter doorway providing access to what was probably once a conservatory.

Humphry Marshall was born nearby, and was well educated in a Quaker family. He at first established a garden at the family homestead, encouraged in his botanical interests by his cousin John Bartram, who is generally credited as being the first British colonial botanist in the Thirteen Colonies. Marshall's first book was A Few Observations Concerning Christ, Or the Eternal Word in 1755. Marshall is best known for his 1788 publication Arbustrum Americanum, which was the first formal scientific description of trees and shrubs of North America. Also skilled as a mason, Marshall may have built this house himself, to specifications that furthered his management and collection of botanical specimens. One notable interior feature is a wooden cabinet built into a space in the masonry walls that appears to be intended as a specimen cabinet.

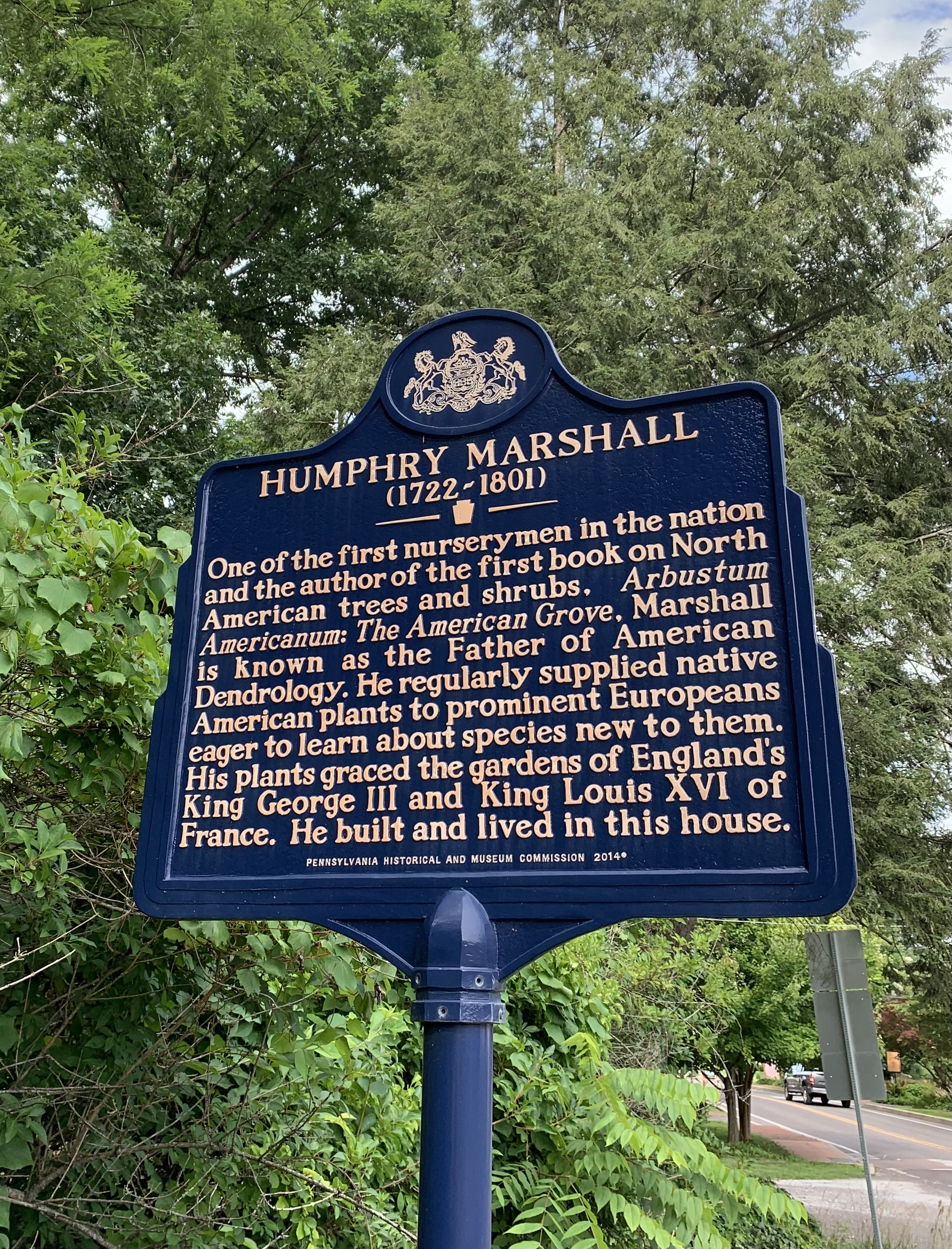
Pennsylvania state historical marker erected in 2014

== See also ==
- National Register of Historic Places listings in Chester County, Pennsylvania
- List of National Historic Landmarks in Pennsylvania
