= West Bradford Township, Pennsylvania =

Township in Pennsylvania, US

West Bradford Township
- Township
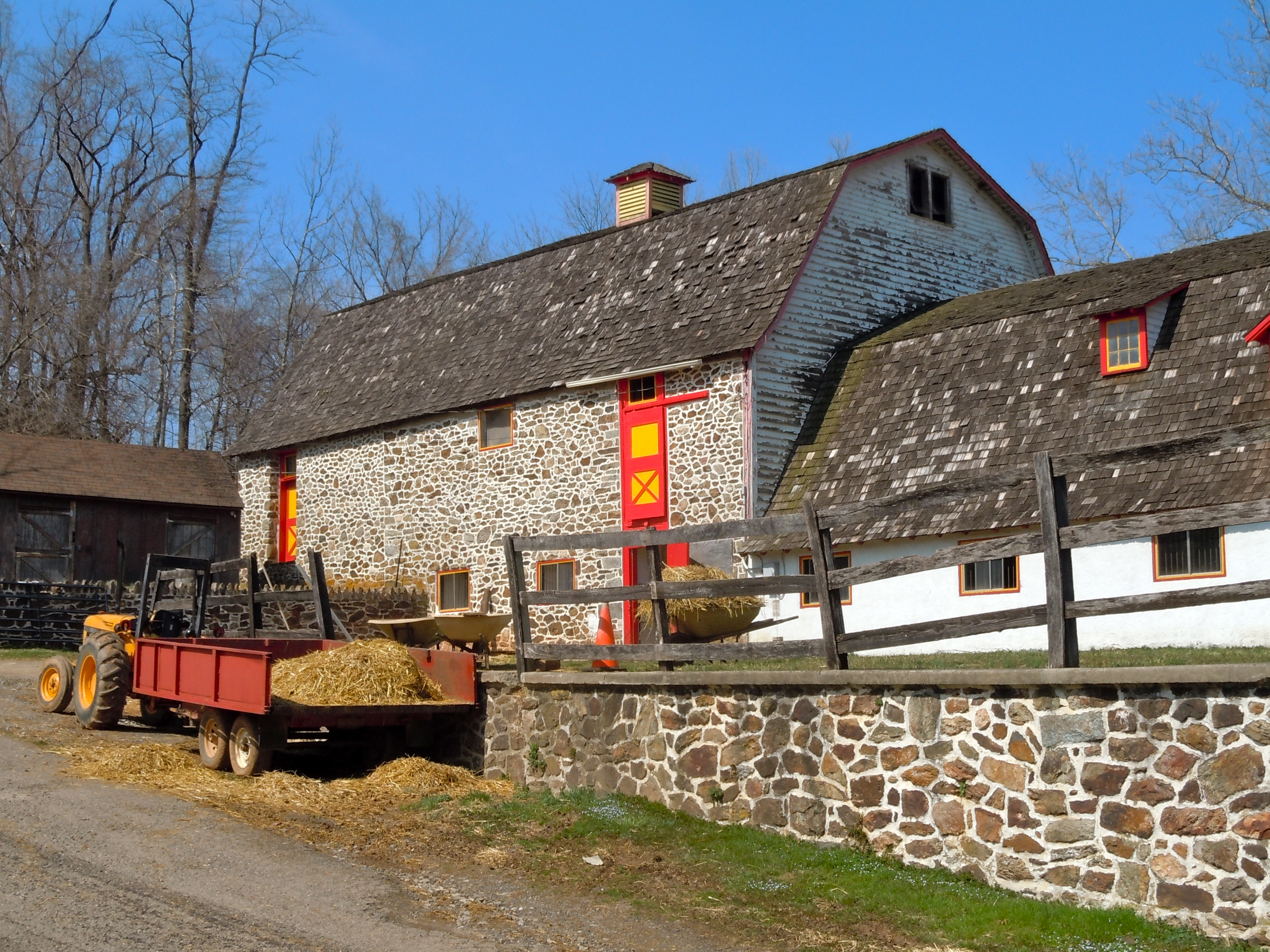
- Derbydown Homestead in West Bradford Township

- Flag Seal Logo
- Motto: "Between the Brandywines"
- Location of West Bradford Township in Chester County and in Pennsylvania

- Location of Pennsylvania in the United States
- Coordinates: 39°57′56″N 75°44′22″W
- Country: United States
- State: Pennsylvania
- County: Chester
- Established: 1705 (as Bradford Twp.)

Government
  - Supervisors: Kevin Houghton Laurie W. Abele; Jack M. Hines, Jr.

Area
  - Total: 18.59 sq mi (48.16 km^{2})
  - Land: 18.50 sq mi (47.91 km^{2})
  - Water: 0.097 sq mi (0.25 km^{2})
- Elevation: 548 ft (167 m)

Population (2010)
  - Total: 14,316
  - Estimate (2016): 12,858
  - Density: 695.1/sq mi (268.39/km^{2})
- Time zone: UTC-5 (EST)
  - Summer (DST): UTC-4 (EDT)
- ZIP Codes: 19335, 19320, 19382, 19380
- Area code: 610
- FIPS code: 42-029-82544
- Website: http://www.westbradford.org

West Bradford Township is a township that is located in Chester County, Pennsylvania, United States. The population was 14,316 at the time of the 2020 census.

== History ==
There are three federal historic districts, Marshallton, Trimbleville, and Northbrook, that are located within West Bradford Township and listed on the National Register of Historic Places.

Also listed are the Baily Farm, the Bradford Friends Meetinghouse, the Como Farm, the Derbydown Homestead, the Humphry Marshall House, the Marshallton Inn, and the Temple-Webster-Stoner House.

== Geography ==
According to the United States Census Bureau, the township has a total area of 18.6 square miles (48.2 km^{2}), of which, 18.6 square miles (48.1 km^{2}) is land and 0.1 square miles (0.2 km^{2}) is water. The total area is 0.32% water.

=== Adjacent municipalities ===
- Caln Township (north)
- Downingtown (north)
- East Caln Township (north)
- East Bradford Township (east)
- Newlin Township (south)
- Pocopson Township (south)
- East Fallowfield Township (west)

=== Neighborhoods ===
- Brandywine Greene
- Embreeville
- Marshallton
- Northbrook
- Romansville
- Trimbleville
- Victoria Crossing at Bradford Glen

== Demographics ==
Historical population
Census	Pop.	Note	%±
1930	1,558		—
1940	1,367		−12.3%
1950	1,530		11.9%
1960	1,894		23.8%
1970	2,996		58.2%
1980	7,343		145.1%
1990	10,406		41.7%
2000	10,775		3.5%
2010	12,376		14.9%
2020	14,316		15.7%

As of the census of 2020, there were 14,706 people comprising 4,974 households residing in the township.

The population density was 773.9 inhabitants per square mile (298.8/km^{2}). There were 4,974 housing units at an average density of 226.7 per square mile (87.5/km^{2}).

The racial makeup of the township was 85.6% White, 2.8% African American, 0% Native American, 4.0% Asian, 0.01% Pacific Islander, 0.1% from other races, and 7.1% from two or more races. 4.1% of the population were Hispanic or Latino of any race.

The average household size was 2.89.

Within the township, the population was spread out, with 30.4% of residents who were under the age of 19, 4.0% from 20 to 24, 24.8% from 25 to 44, 31.7% from 45 to 64, and 9.2% who were 65 years of age or older. The median age was 39.6 years.

For every 100 females, there were 100.1 males. For every 100 females age 18 and over, there were 97.7 males.

The median income for a family was $162,606

== Education ==
=== Public schools ===
West Bradford Township is served by the Downingtown Area School District, and has two elementary schools within the township:

- Bradford Heights Elementary School
- West Bradford Elementary School

Each of the two elementary schools serves sections of the township. All of the township is zoned to Downingtown Middle School and Downingtown West High School.

== Transportation ==
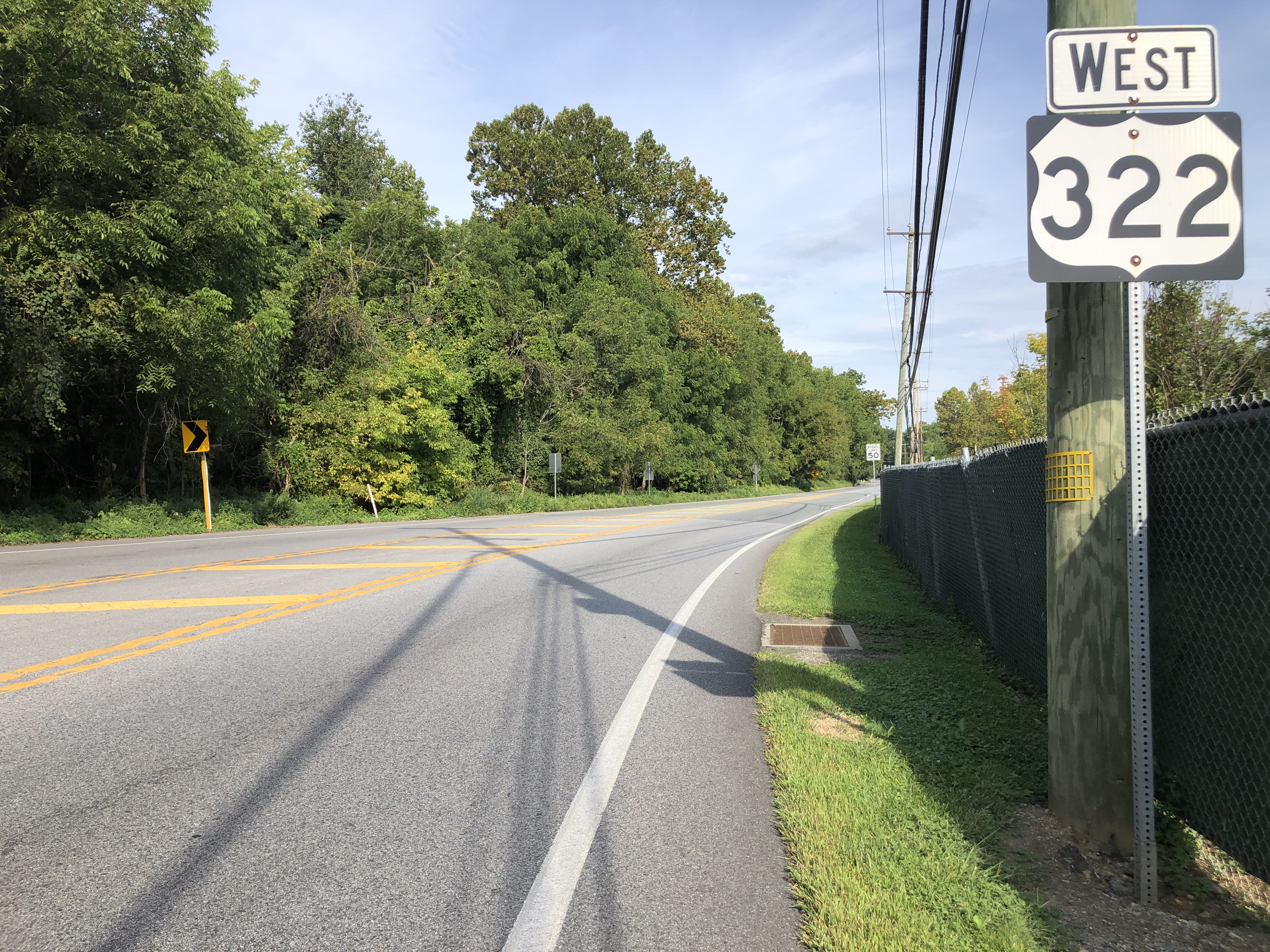
US 322 westbound in West Bradford Township

As of 2021, there were 103.39 miles (166.39 km) of public roads in West Bradford Township, of which 26.82 miles (43.16 km) were maintained by the Pennsylvania Department of Transportation (PennDOT) and 76.57 miles (123.23 km) were maintained by the township.

U.S. Route 322 and Pennsylvania Route 162 are the numbered roads serving West Bradford Township. US 322 follows the Downingtown Pike along a northwest–southeast alignment across the northeastern portion of the township. PA 162 follows Telegraph Road and Strasburg Road along a southwest–northeast alignment across the southeastern portion of the township.

== Notable places ==
- The west branch of the Brandywine River passes through West Bradford. General Cornwallis of the British Army crossed the river at Trimble's Ford en route to the Battle of Brandywine.
- Broad Run Golfer's Club, a golf course designed by Rees Jones
- Humphry Marshall House, residence of botanist Humphry Marshall located in the village of Marshallton
- Strasburg Road, a historic road paved in 1772-3 that runs through West Bradford
- United Sports, a multiple-use sports complex

== Notable people ==
- John Beale Bordley
- John Hickman
- Humphry Marshall, botanist
- Claude Rains, four-time Oscar-nominated actor, Captain Renault in Casablanca
