= Bradford Friends Meetinghouse =

Historic church in Pennsylvania, United States

- U.S. National Register of Historic Places
- U.S. Historic district – Contributing property
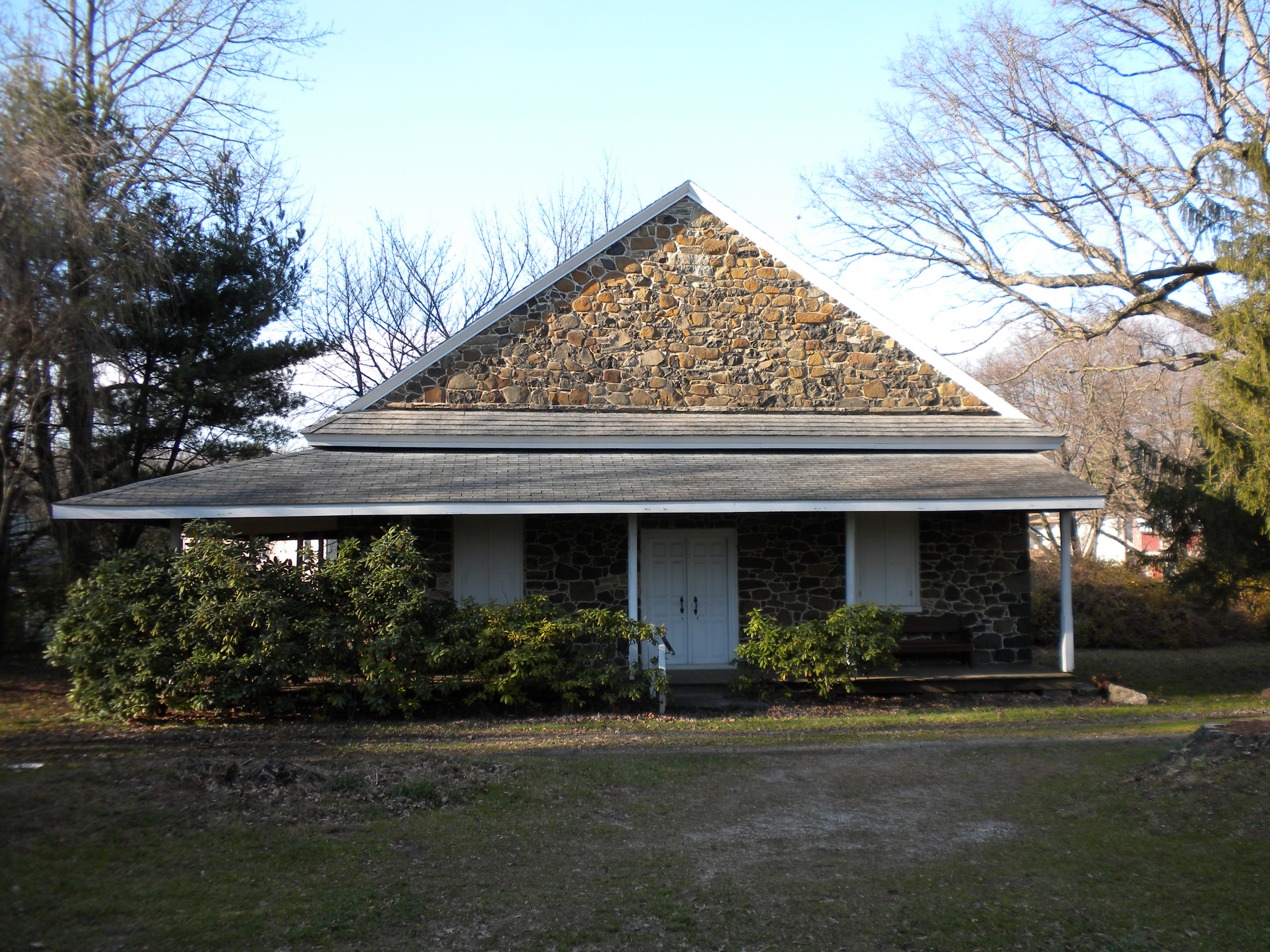
- Bradford Friends Meetinghouse, December 2009

- Location within Pennsylvania Location within the United States
- Location: Eastern side of Northbrook Road in Marshallton, West Bradford Township, Pennsylvania
- Coordinates: 39°56′54″N 75°40′47″W
- Area: 12.1 acres (4.9 ha)
- Built: 1764-1765
- NRHP reference No.: 71000694
- Added to NRHP: July 27, 1971

Bradford Friends Meetinghouse, also known as Marshallton Meeting House, is a historic Quaker meeting house located at Marshallton in West Bradford Township, Chester County, Pennsylvania. It was built in 1764–1765, and is a one-story, stone structure with a gable roof. A porch was added to two sides of the building in the 19th century. The interior is divided into four rooms, rather than the customary two. Abraham Marshall, father of botanist Humphry Marshall was instrumental in the establishment of the meeting in the 1720s. The meeting originally met from 1722 to 1727 at the Marshall home, Derbydown Homestead, from 1722 to 1727.

It was added to the National Register of Historic Places in 1971. It is located in the Marshallton Historic District.
