= Northbrook Historic District =

Historic district in Pennsylvania, United States

- U.S. National Register of Historic Places
- U.S. Historic district
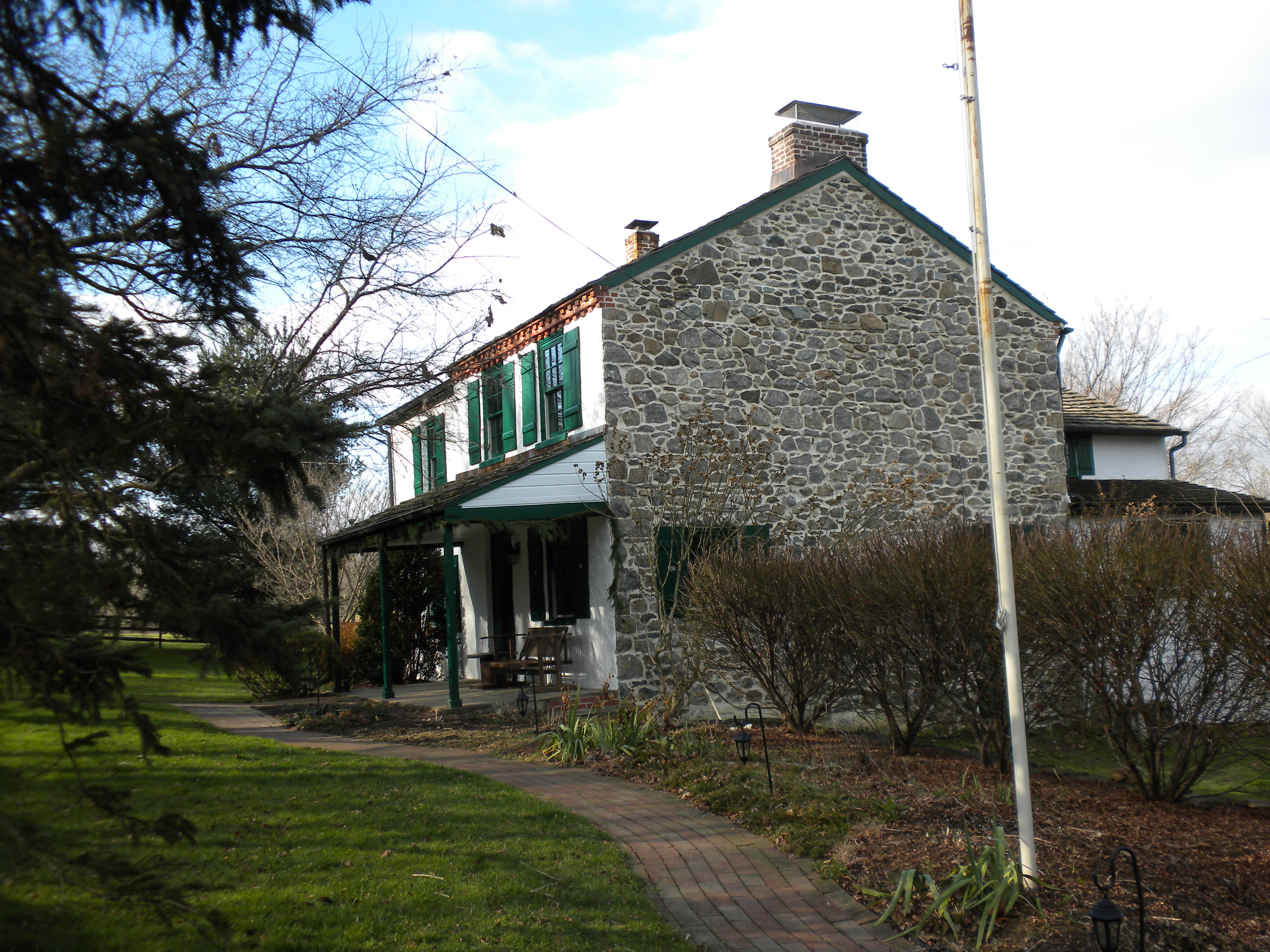
- House in the Northbrook Historic District, December 2009

- Location within Pennsylvania Location within the United States
- Location: Northbrook, Indian Hannah & Bragg Hill Rds., Newlin Township, Pocopson Township, and West Bradford Township, Pennsylvania
- Coordinates: 39°55′19″N 75°41′29″W
- Area: 165 acres (67 ha)
- Architect: Multiple
- Architectural style: Gothic Revival
- MPS: West Branch Brandywine Creek MRA
- NRHP reference No.: 85002374
- Added to NRHP: September 16, 1985

The Northbrook Historic District, also known as Marshall's Mill and Marshall's Station, is a national historic district that is located in Newlin Township, Pocopson Township, and West Bradford Township, Chester County, Pennsylvania.

It was added to the National Register of Historic Places in 1985.

== History and architectural features ==
This district encompasses fourteen contributing buildings and three contributing sites that are located in the village of Northbrook and primarily situated on five properties. Built during the eighteenth and nineteenth centuries, they include the Blacksmith's house, a station house, a post office and store, a coal and lumber company, the Lewis Marshall house, a Gothic Revival-style Indian Rock Farm, the Baily House (1902), the Northbrook Sunday School (1900), and the site of Hannah Freeman's cabin, Indian Rock, and Indian Burial Ground.
