= Temple-Webster-Stoner House =

Historic house in Pennsylvania, United States

- U.S. National Register of Historic Places
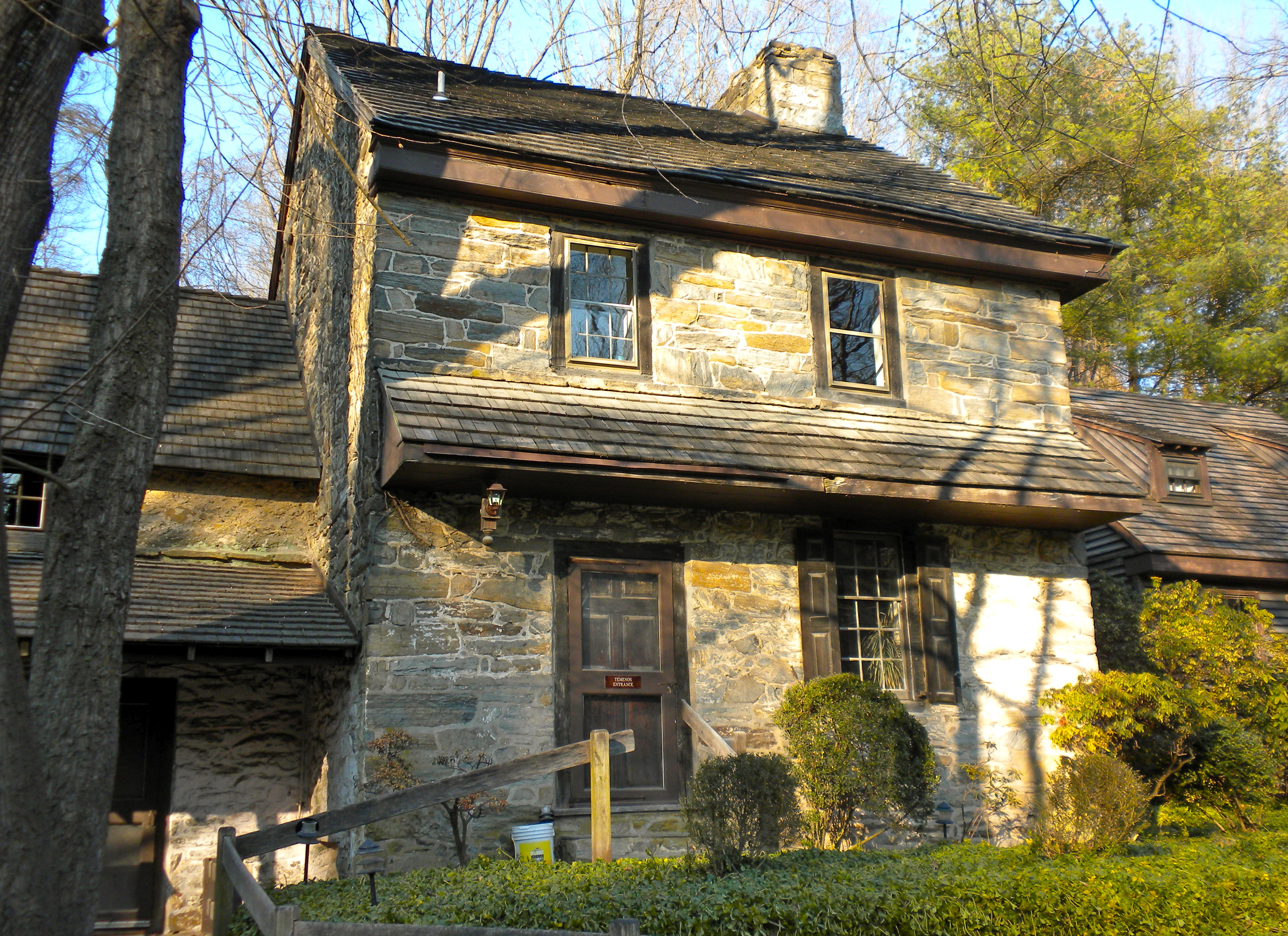
- Temple-Webster-Stoner House, January 2010

- Location within Pennsylvania Location within the United States
- Location: East of Romansville off Pennsylvania Route 162, West Bradford Township, Pennsylvania
- Coordinates: 39°56′42″N 75°42′5″W
- Area: 1 acre (0.40 ha)
- Built: 1714, c. 1730
- NRHP reference No.: 72133612
- Added to NRHP: March 7, 1973

The Temple-Webster-Stoner House, also known as the Little House on Broad Run or the Old Mill House, is an historic home that is located in West Bradford Township, Chester County, Pennsylvania, United States.

It was added to the National Register of Historic Places in 1973.

== History and architectural features ==
A datestone suggests that this house was built in 1714, but it may have been built at the same time as the mill was erected (circa 1730). It is a 2 1/2-story, fieldstone structure. A kitchen wing was added circa 1800. Now used as a Unitarian Retreat.
