= Col. John Hannum House =

Historic house in Pennsylvania, United States

- U.S. National Register of Historic Places
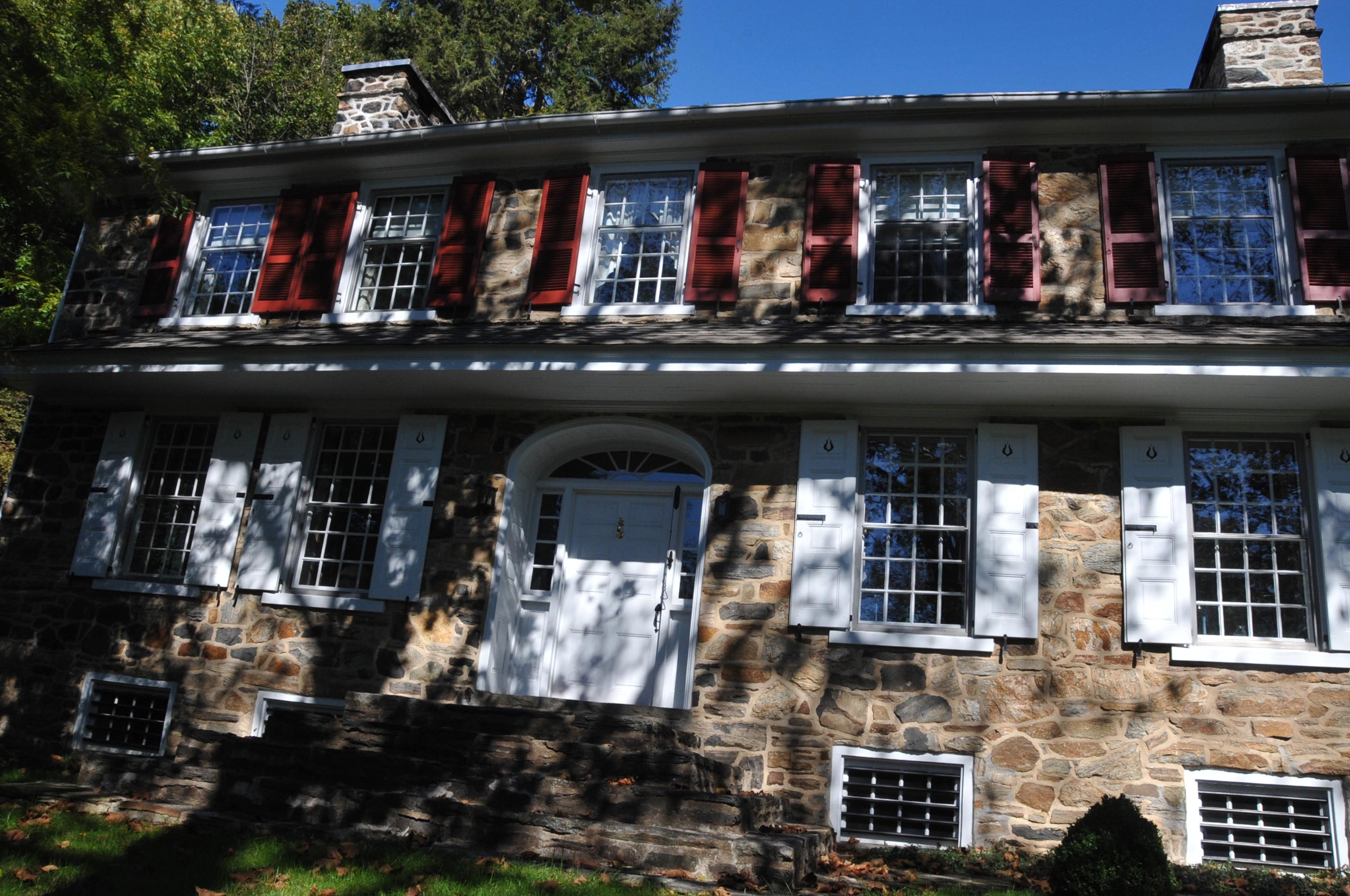

- Location within Pennsylvania Location within the United States
- Location: Northeast of Marshallton at 898 Frank Road, East Bradford Township, Pennsylvania
- Coordinates: 39°58′06″N 75°39′34″W
- Area: 5.1 acres (2.1 ha)
- Built: c. 1760
- Architectural style: Georgian
- NRHP reference No.: 80003463
- Added to NRHP: December 10, 1980

Col. John Hannum House is a historic house located in East Bradford Township, Chester County, Pennsylvania. The original section was built about 1760, and has three additions. The original section is 2 1/2 stories and constructed of fieldstone. It is five bays wide and has a gable roof. It has a two-story rectangular wing with a gable roof. Attached to the wing is a banked addition and one-story garage. It was the home of politician, businessman and colonial militiaman John Hannum III (1744 – 1799).

It was added to the National Register of Historic Places in 1980.
