= Trimbleville Historic District =

Historic district in Pennsylvania, United States

- U.S. National Register of Historic Places
- U.S. Historic district
- Pennsylvania state historical marker
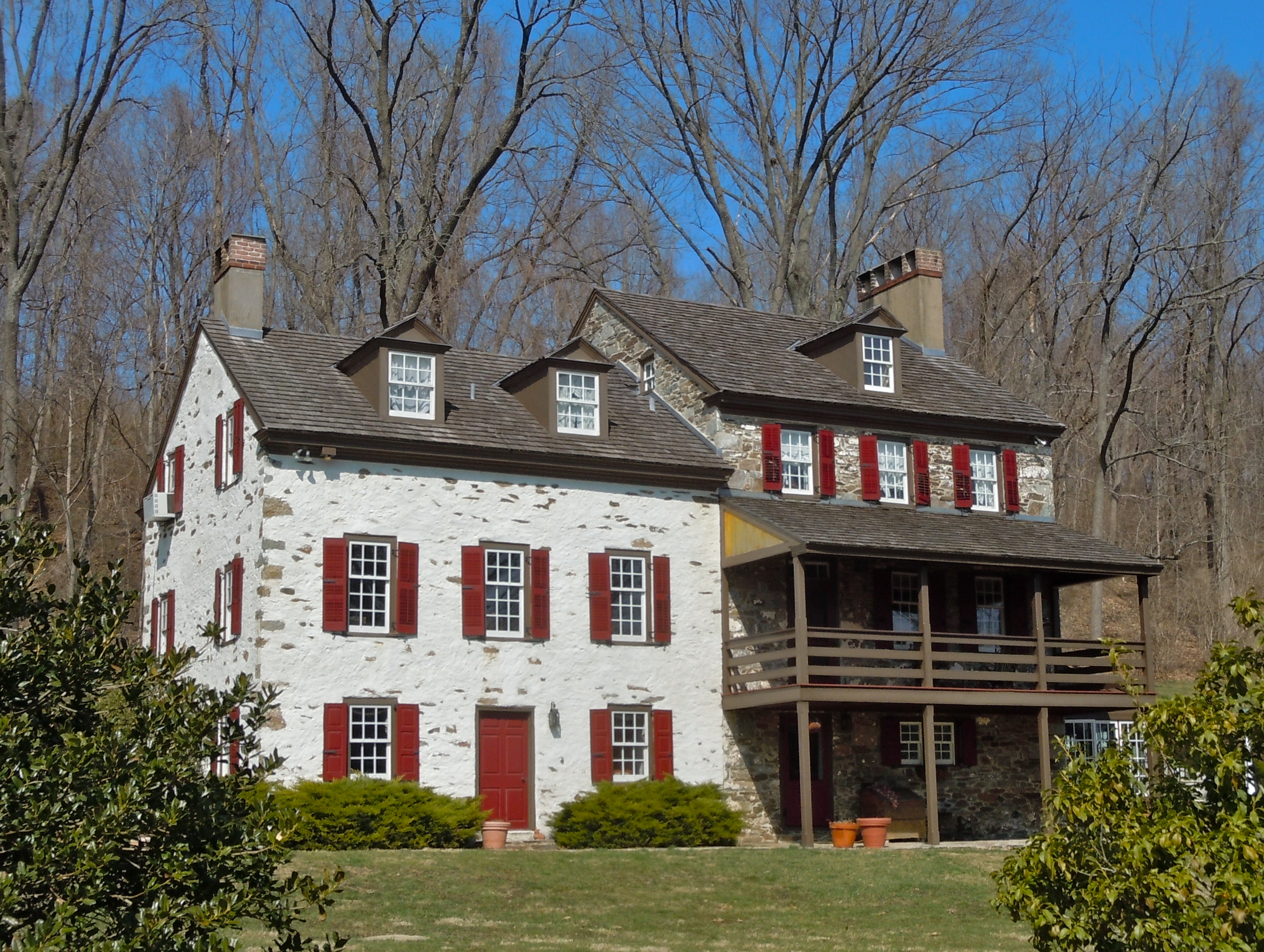
- Greenwood Dell Boarding School in March 2011

- Location within Pennsylvania Location within the United States
- Location: Northbrook, Broad Run, and Camp Linden Rds., Pocopson & West Bradford Twps., Pennsylvania
- Coordinates: 39°55′55″N 75°40′56″W
- Area: 125 acres (51 ha)
- Architect: Multiple
- Architectural style: Colonial, Federal, Vernacular Colonial
- MPS: West Branch Brandywine Creek MRA
- NRHP reference No.: 85002377

Significant dates
- Added to NRHP: September 16, 1985
- Designated PHMC: September 01, 1915

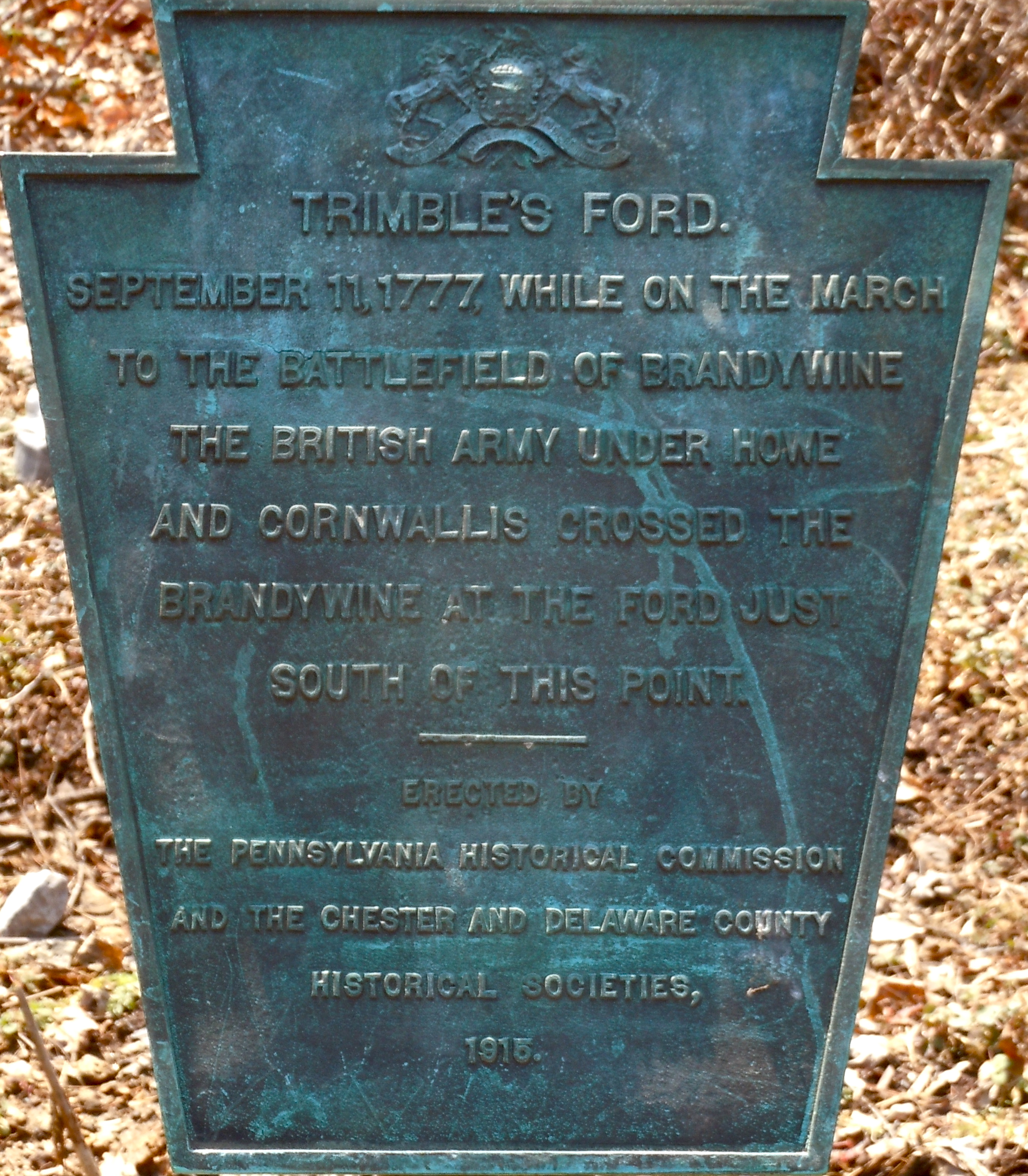
1915 historical marker near Trimble's Ford, where more than twelve thousand British troops crossed the Brandywine on September 11, 1777, during the Battle of Brandywine

Trimbleville, Pennsylvania, also known as Trimble's Ford and the Trimbleville Historic District, is a hamlet of roughly six homes that is located in southern Chester County, Pennsylvania, approximately two miles south of Marshallton.

== History ==
Trimble first bought land in the area on the banks of the west branch of the Brandywine River in 1744; his descendants lived in the community until 1948.

During the Battle of Brandywine on September 11, 1777, more than twelve thousand British troops under Generals William Howe and Charles Cornwallis crossed the west branch of the Brandywine at Trimble's Ford. The troops began the flanking maneuver in Kennett Square, made their first crossing at Trimble's Ford, then crossed the east branch at Jefferis Ford, before engaging the American troops near Birmingham Friends Meetinghouse.

Several buildings survive from the eighteenth century, including the Trimble farmhouse, a mill, blacksmith and wheelwright shops, and a boarding school. The area was listed by the National Register of Historic Places as a historic district in 1985.
