= Humphry Marshall =

American botanist and plant dealer (1722–1801)

- Born: October 10, 1722; Marshallton, Pennsylvania, US
- Died: November 5, 1801 (aged 79); Marshallton, Pennsylvania
- Occupation: Botanist
- Scientific career
- Fields: Dendrology
- Author abbrev. (botany): Marshall

Humphry Marshall (October 10, 1722 – November 5, 1801) was an American botanist and plant dealer.

== Biography ==
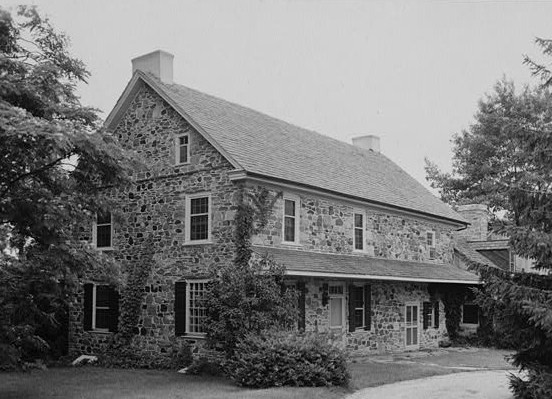
Humphry Marshall House in Marshallton, now a National Historic Landmark

Humphry Marshall was born at Derbydown Homestead in the village of Marshallton, Pennsylvania (within West Bradford Township) on October 10, 1722. He was the cousin of botanists John Bartram and William Bartram. Like many early American botanists, he was a Quaker.

Marshall received the rudiments of an English education, and was apprenticed to the business of a stonemason, which trade he subsequently followed. Soon after his marriage in 1748 to Sarah Pennock he took charge of his father's farm. His first book, A Few Observations Concerning Christ, in 1755. He began to devote his attention to astronomy and natural history, building a small observatory in one corner of his residence. He specialized early in native plants, after gaining his enthusiasm for botany from John Bartram. In 1767 he came into the possession of the family estate, and in 1773 he created a botanical garden at Marshallton with both native and exotic plants. This was the second botanical garden in the United States, the first having been established by John Bartram. As late as 1849, many of the plants still survived, although neglect had turned the garden into a wilderness.

In 1785, Marshall published Arbustrum Americanum: The American Grove, an Alphabetical Catalogue of Forest Trees and Shrubs, Natives of the American United States (Philadelphia). For many years, he was the treasurer for Chester County and trustee of the public loan office. In 1768, he was elected a member of the American Philosophical Society, and he was a member of other scientific societies.

Marshall's first wife died in 1786; he married Margaret Minshall in 1788. He had no children by either wife. In his later years, he was partly blinded by cataracts. Marshall died on November 5, 1801.

It appears Humphrey Marshall was a slaveholder. This research paper Slavery-in-the-Greater-Philadelphia-copyedited-Jan-2024.pdf case #16 mentions Negro Abraham Johnson, slave of Humphrey Marshall.

== Legacy ==
Marshall has been called the "Father of American Dendrology."

A genus of plants, Marshallia, was named in honor of Humphry Marshall and his nephew Moses Marshall, also a botanist.

In 1848 the Borough of West Chester established the Marshall Square Park in his honor. Marshall Square Park is four miles east of Marshallton.

On June 27, 2007 — proclaimed Humphry Marshall Day by West Chester mayor Dick Yoder — a marker honoring the park's namesake was unveiled.

== Notes ==
https://lowermerionhistory.org/wp-content/uploads/2024/02/Slavery-in-the-Greater-Philadelphia-copyedited-Jan-2024.pdf
