= Broad Run Golfer's Club =

Golf course in Pennsylvania, U.S.

- Interactive map of Broad Run Golfer's Club
- 39.953°N 75.708°W

Club information
- Location: West Bradford Township, Pennsylvania
- Established: 2000
- Type: Public
- Owner: Byler Golf Mgmt
- Operator: EAGL
- Total holes: 18
- Greens: Bent Grass (G2)
- Fairways: Bent Grass (Princeville)
- Website: Official Website
- Designed by: Rees Jones
- Par: 72
- Length: 6,826 yards
- Course rating: 72.8

Broad Run Golfer's Club (formerly known as Tattersall Golf Club) is a golf course located in West Bradford Township, Pennsylvania. The course was designed by Rees Jones, who is well known for designing many other prestigious courses. The course's Championship tees have a rating of 72.8.

== Scorecard ==
Broad Run
| Tee | Rating/Slope | 1 | 2 | 3 | 4 | 5 | 6 | 7 | 8 | 9 | Out | 10 | 11 | 12 | 13 | 14 | 15 | 16 | 17 | 18 | In | Total |
| Black | 73.4/139 | 474 | 412 | 375 | 383 | 315 | 412 | 425 | 146 | 395 | 3337 | 201 | 385 | 532 | 195 | 422 | 547 | 398 | 184 | 550 | 3414 | 6751 |
| Blue | 71.6/136 | 455 | 404 | 356 | 340 | 299 | 396 | 405 | 131 | 376 | 3162 | 175 | 364 | 504 | 172 | 403 | 524 | 384 | 157 | 535 | 3218 | 6380 |
| White | 70.3/132 75.8/131 (W) | 440 | 390 | 340 | 324 | 293 | 379 | 387 | 117 | 365 | 3035 | 158 | 347 | 487 | 147 | 382 | 496 | 367 | 140 | 521 | 3045 | 6080 |
| SI | | 6 | 4 | 14 | 12 | 16 | 10 | 2 | 18 | 8 | | 11 | 15 | 3 | 13 | 1 | 7 | 9 | 17 | 5 |
| Par | | 5 | 4 | 4 | 4 | 4 | 4 | 4 | 3 | 4 | 36 | 3 | 4 | 5 | 3 | 4 | 5 | 4 | 3 | 5 | 36 | 72 |
| Lime | 68.2/128 | 412 | 342 | 340 | 297 | 293 | 379 | 351 | 117 | 320 | 2851 | 158 | 347 | 473 | 147 | 292 | 451 | 317 | 140 | 486 | 2811 | 5662 |
| Yellow | 67.0/126 72.2/124 (W) | 412 | 342 | 289 | 297 | 279 | 320 | 351 | 107 | 320 | 2717 | 132 | 310 | 473 | 129 | 292 | 451 | 317 | 131 | 486 | 2721 | 5438 |
| Red | 70.9/120 (W) | 401 | 332 | 281 | 239 | 250 | 312 | 340 | 97 | 308 | 2560 | 123 | 304 | 458 | 125 | 288 | 442 | 309 | 122 | 480 | 2651 | 5211 |
