= Baily Farm =

Historic house in Pennsylvania, United States

- U.S. National Register of Historic Places
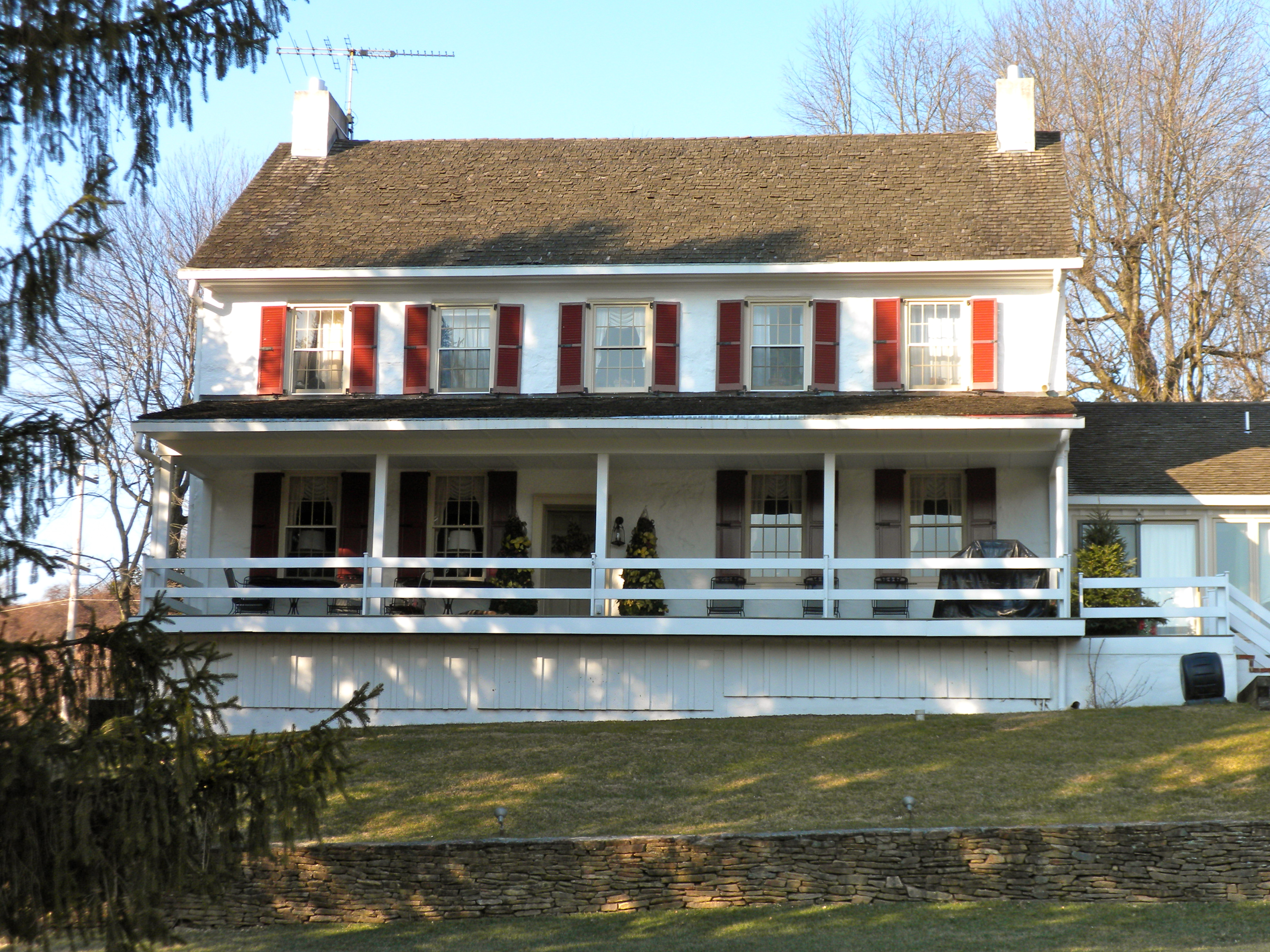
- Baily Farmhouse, January 2010

- Location within Pennsylvania Location within the United States
- Location: Strasburg and Broad Run Rds., West Bradford Township, Pennsylvania
- Coordinates: 39°56′55″N 75°42′11″W
- Area: 7.2 acres (2.9 ha)
- Built: c. 1795
- Architectural style: Federal, Vernacular Federal
- MPS: West Branch Brandywine Creek MRA
- NRHP reference No.: 85002347
- Added to NRHP: September 16, 1985

Baily Farm is a historic home and barn located in West Bradford Township, Chester County, Pennsylvania. The house was built about 1795, and is a two-story, five-bay, stuccoed stone dwelling in a vernacular Federal style. It has a gable roof with gable end chimneys. Also on the property is a frame bank barn on a stone foundation. It is believed to date to the 18th century.

It was added to the National Register of Historic Places in 1985.
