= Marshallton Inn =

- U.S. National Register of Historic Places
- U.S. Historic district – Contributing property
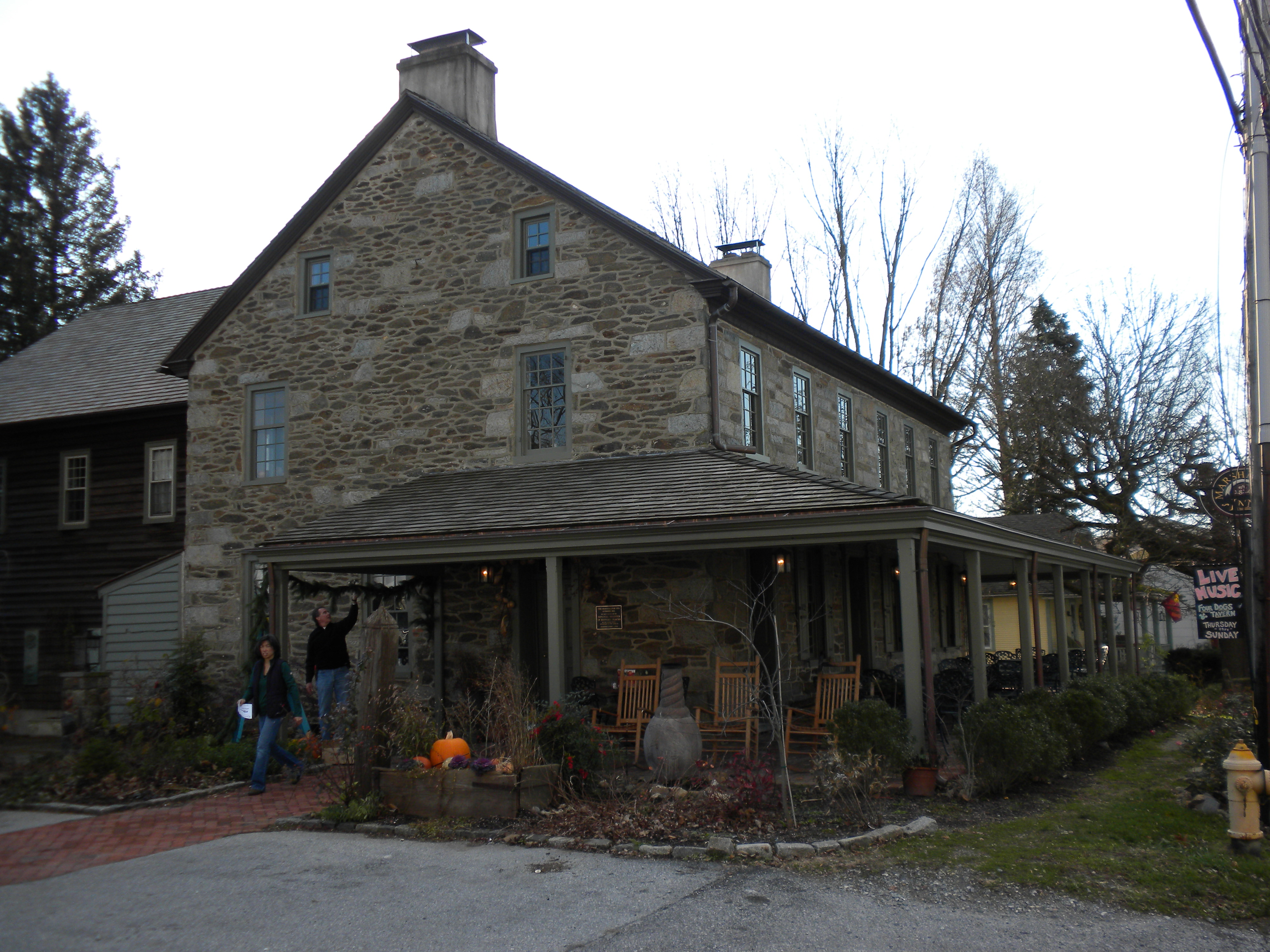
- Marshallton Inn, December 2009

- Location within Pennsylvania Location within the United States
- Location: W. Strasburg Rd., West Bradford Township, Pennsylvania
- Coordinates: 39°57′1″N 75°40′43″W
- Area: 0.5 acres (0.20 ha)
- Built: c. 1790
- Built by: Woodward, John; Martin, Abraham
- Architectural style: Federal
- NRHP reference No.: 77001152
- Added to NRHP: July 29, 1977

The Marshallton Inn, also known as The General Wayne Inn, is an historic inn and tavern that is located in West Bradford Township, Chester County, Pennsylvania.

Located in the Marshallton Historic District, it was added to the National Register of Historic Places in 1977.

== History and architectural features ==
The original section of this historic structure was built circa 1790, and was subsequently enlarged with five additions. It is a two-and-one-half-story, fieldstone and frame structure that was designed in an Early Federal style. Originally built as a residence, it was converted to an inn and tavern by 1814. It continues to operate as a tavern and restaurant.
