= Como Farm (Pennsylvania) =

Historic house in Pennsylvania, United States

- U.S. National Register of Historic Places
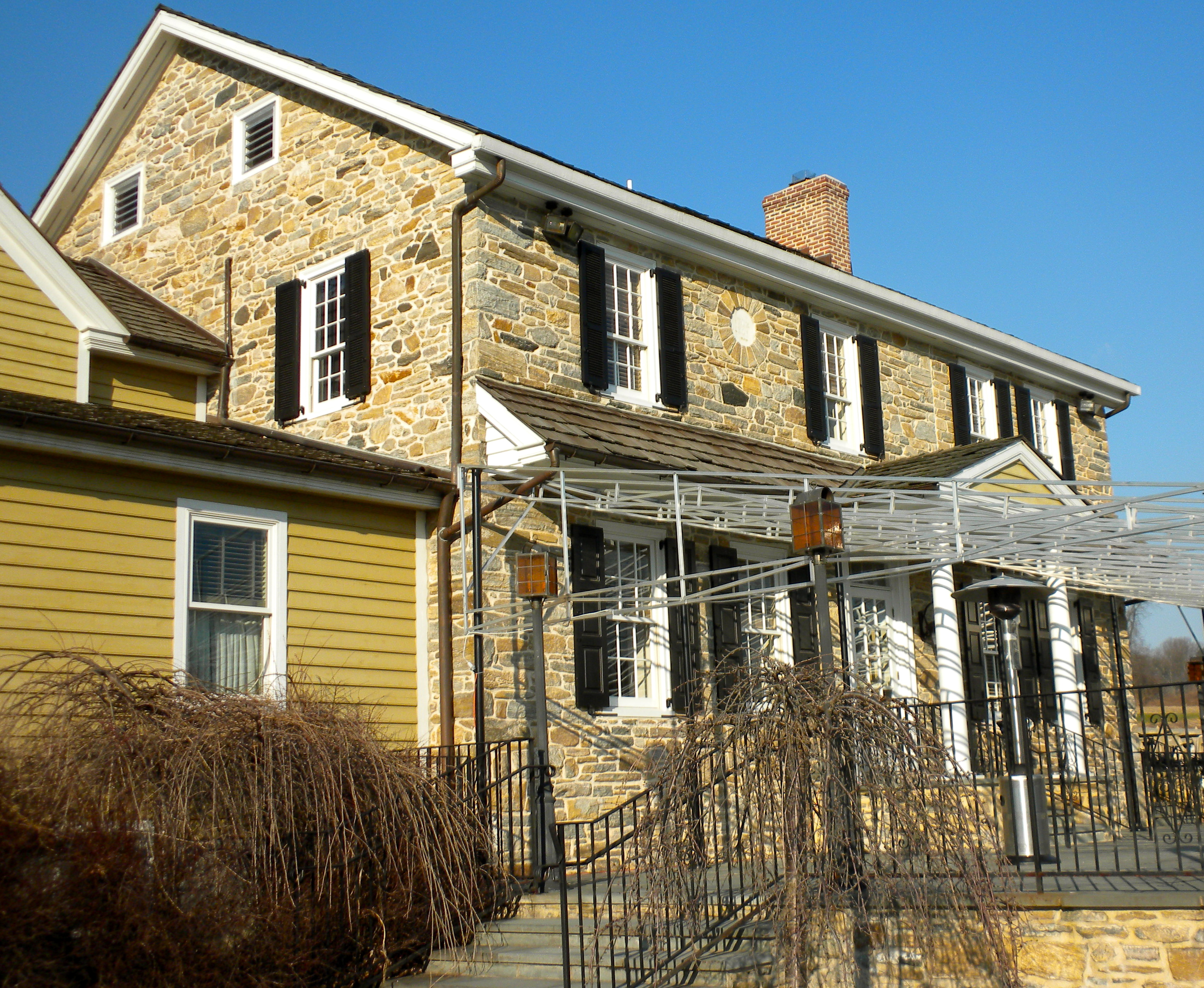

- Location within Pennsylvania Location within the United States
- Location: Broad Run Road, West Bradford Township, Pennsylvania, U.S.
- Coordinates: 39.952222°N 75.707222°W
- Built: 1702
- Architectural style: Georgian
- NRHP reference No.: 85002348
- Added to NRHP: September 16, 1985

Como Farm is a historic farmhouse located in West Bradford Township, Chester County, in the U.S. state of Pennsylvania.

Como Farm was listed on the National Register of Historic Places on September 16, 1985.

== Description and history ==
Significant because of its role in agricultural innovation, the Georgian Quaker stone farmhouse was built circa 1702. John Beale Bordley purchased the property in 1792 to establish one of the colonies' first model farms to experiment with crop rotation, soil fertility, and farm machinery. He co-founded the Philadelphia Society for Promoting Agriculture and authored popular books advising farmers on sustainable agriculture. A Pennsylvania state historical marker commemorating Bordley was placed near the farm in 1953.

In 1991, West Bradford Township preserved Bordley's 400-plus-acre estate as a historic site. In 2000, the property became Tattersall Golf Course, renamed Broad Run Golfer's Club in 2006.

The farmhouse was restored to become the clubhouse for the golf course.
