= Jefferis Ford =

River Cross

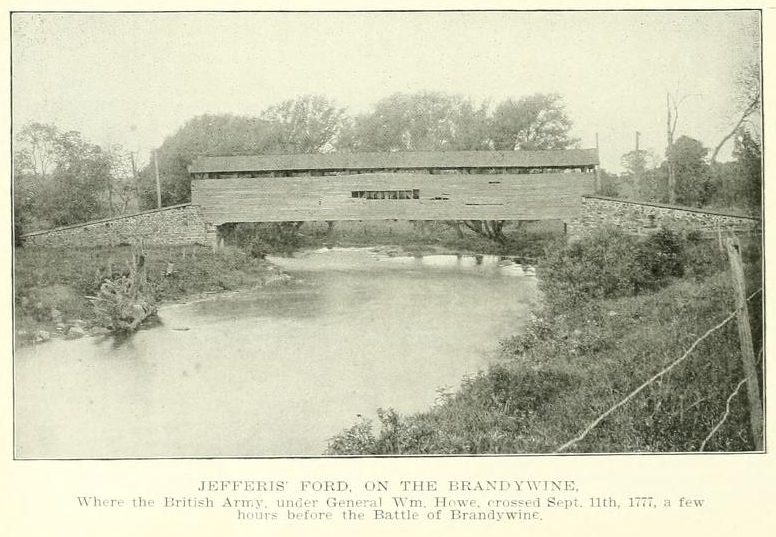
- Jefferis Ford Covered Bridge (burned in 1953)

Location
- Country: United States
- State: Pennsylvania
- County: East Bradford Township, Chester County

Jefferis Ford is a river-crossing of the Brandywine located in Chester County, Pennsylvania which was significant in the American Revolutionary War. In the march of British troops leading up to the Battle of the Brandywine General William Howe crossed here as well as at Trimble's Ford in a surprise maneuver in an attack on George Washington's troops to the south.

The ford is named for Robert Jefferis (1668–1739) who moved to the region around 1701. He had emigrated from England to Chester County around 1681.
