= James Mease =

American scientist, horticulturist & doctor (1771-1846)

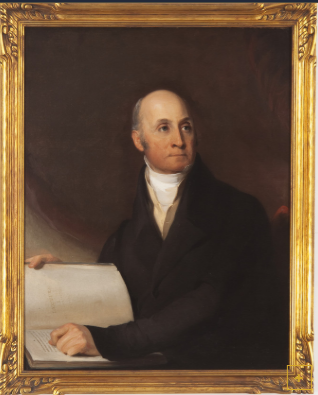
- portrait by Thomas Sully, 1834
- Born: August 11, 1771; Philadelphia
- Died: May 14, 1846 (aged 74); Philadelphia
- Occupation: Medical doctor
- Spouse(s): Sarah Butler

James Mease (1771–1846) was an American scientist, horticulturist, and medical doctor from Philadelphia who published the first known tomato-based ketchup recipe in 1812.

== Early life and education ==
Mease was born on August 11, 1771, the son of Philadelphians John and Esther (Miller) Mease. After receiving his bachelor's degree from the University of Pennsylvania in 1787, he continued in medical school there, receiving his M.D. in 1792. Early in his medical career, Mease published several articles, and he served as a surgeon for nine months during the War of 1812.

== Publications and collected writings ==
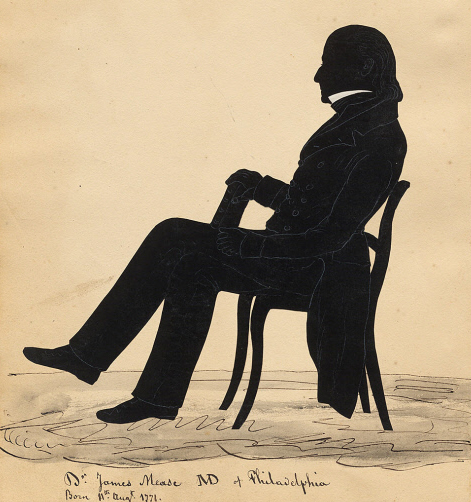
1843 silhouette of Dr. James Mease

Dr. Mease's published contributions to medical knowledge, however, were less significant than his contributions to several other fields. In addition to several medical works, Mease edited the well-received Domestic Encyclopedia (1803–04) and the two volume Archives of useful knowledge (1811–12), but he remains best known for this seminar 372-page volume, "The Picture of Philadelphia", and his 1807 Geological Account of the United States, which was among the earliest geological treatises by an American.

A numismatist, Mease published "Description of Some of the Medals Struck in Relation to Important Events in North America" in the Collections of the New-York Historical Society (vol. 3, 1821). Many of his papers were read before the American Philosophical Society, to which he was elected in 1802 and of which he was an officer, 1824–1836. He was a founder and first vice-president of the Athenaeum of Philadelphia.

Mease's papers are today deposited in the Louise M. Darling Biomedical Library's History and Special Collections division at the University of California at Los Angeles. There is also a collection of his writings at the Duke University David M. Rubenstein Rare Book & Manuscript Library

== Ketchup innovation ==
Ketchup has been around the world for centuries, beginning in China/Vietnam. Mease's 1812 recipe's innovation was the addition of a tomato base, which has become the ubiquitous form of condiment in the United States and Europe. His ketchup was probably more in keeping with tomato sauce developed in England by Alexander Hunter and used by Maria Eliza Rundell in a cookbook that was published in Britain and America. He may have also been exposed to the sauce consumed by French Creole refugees from a war in Haiti. His recipe involved spices and brandy, no sugar or vinegar. He called tomatoes "Love Apples," the term used by the French.

Recipe:Slice the apples thin, and over every layer sprinkle a little salt; cover them, and let them lie twenty-four hours; then beat them well, and simmer them half an hour in a bell-metal kettle; then add mace & allspice. When cold, add two cloves of raw shallots cut small, and half a gill of brandy to each bottle, which must be corked tight, and kept in a cool place.

== Family ==
On July 3, 1800, Dr. Mease married Sarah Butler, the daughter of South Carolina Senator, Pierce Butler. They had two sons, both of whom changed their surnames as adults to Butler in order to secure an inheritance. One of the sons, Pierce Butler, married the renowned stage actress, Frances Anne Kemble. James Mease died on May 14, 1846, and was buried at Laurel Hill Cemetery in Philadelphia. He met Fanny Kemble in 1832, and they married in 1834.
