= Derbydown Homestead =

Historic house in Pennsylvania, United States

- U.S. National Register of Historic Places
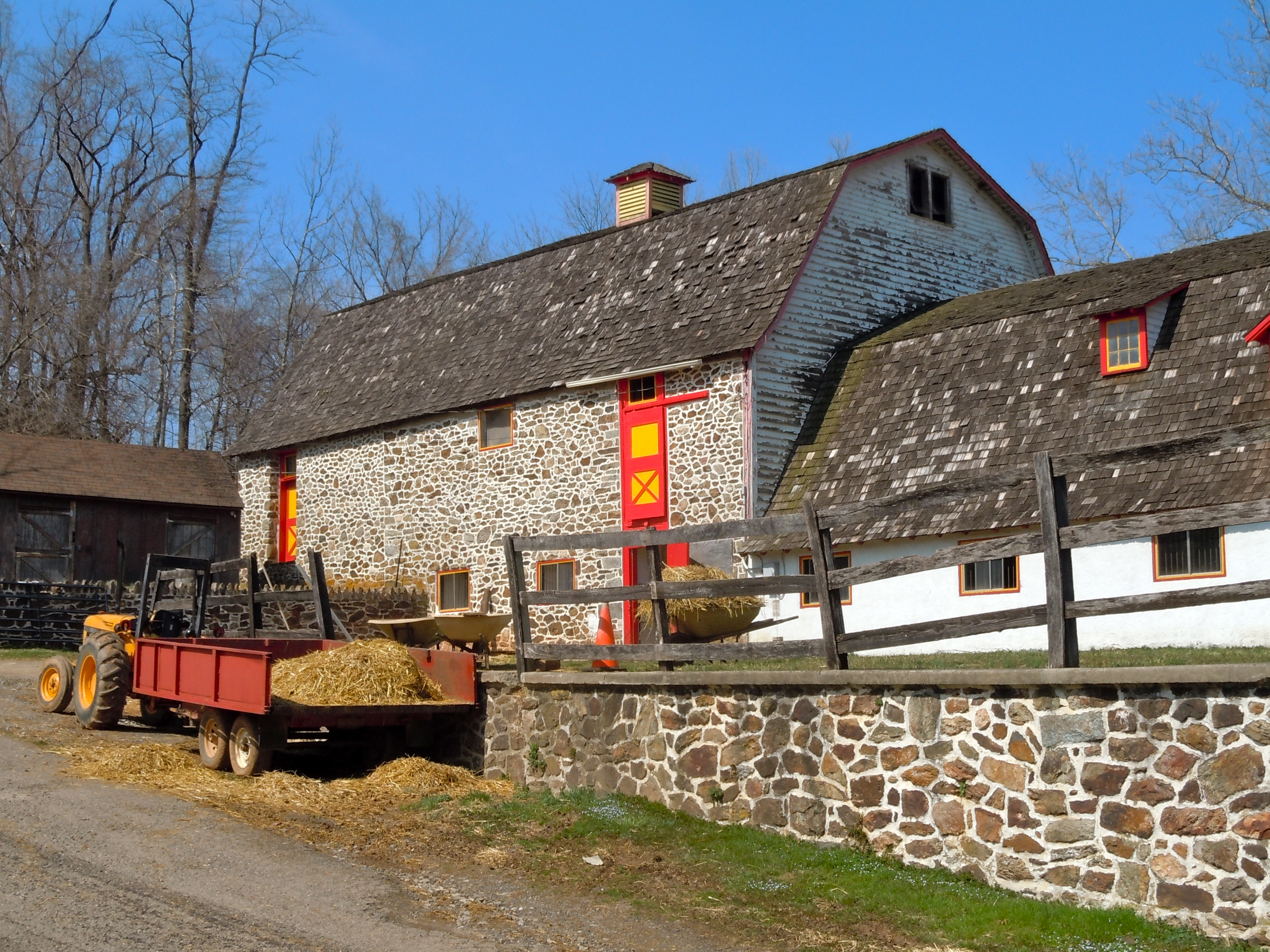
- Derbydown Barn, March 2011

- Location within Pennsylvania Location within the United States
- Location: At jct. of CR 15077 and 15080, West Bradford Township, Pennsylvania
- Coordinates: 39°55′31″N 75°41′12″W
- Area: 9.8 acres (4.0 ha)
- Built: 1707
- MPS: West Branch Brandywine Creek MRA
- NRHP reference No.: 73001609
- Added to NRHP: April 2, 1973

Derbydown Homestead, also known as the Abraham Marshall House and Birthplace of Humphry Marshall, is a historic home located in West Bradford Township, Chester County, Pennsylvania. The original house was built in 1707, as a one-room, three bay, 1 1/2-story stone structure. It was later enlarged to have a gambrel roof. In 1764, it was enlarged again to 2 1/2 stories with stone and brick construction, and the roof modified to a gable roof with pent eve. Also on the property is a large barn with a gambrel roof. It was first owned by Abraham Marshall, founder of the Bradford Friends Meetinghouse, which met in the house from 1722 to 1727. Abraham was referred on certificate from the Monyash Monthly Meeting in England, to the Darby Monthly Meeting in Pennsylvania, 9th of the 2nd Month 1700. Abraham married Mary Hunt(sister of Elizabeth Hunt Bartram, mother of kings Botanist, John Bartram) at the Darby Meeting 1/17/1702-3 (Hinshaw Index Darby Monthly Meeting, p127) Marshall was the father of botanist Humphry Marshall, who was born at the house in 1722.

It was added to the National Register of Historic Places in 1973.

== Gallery ==
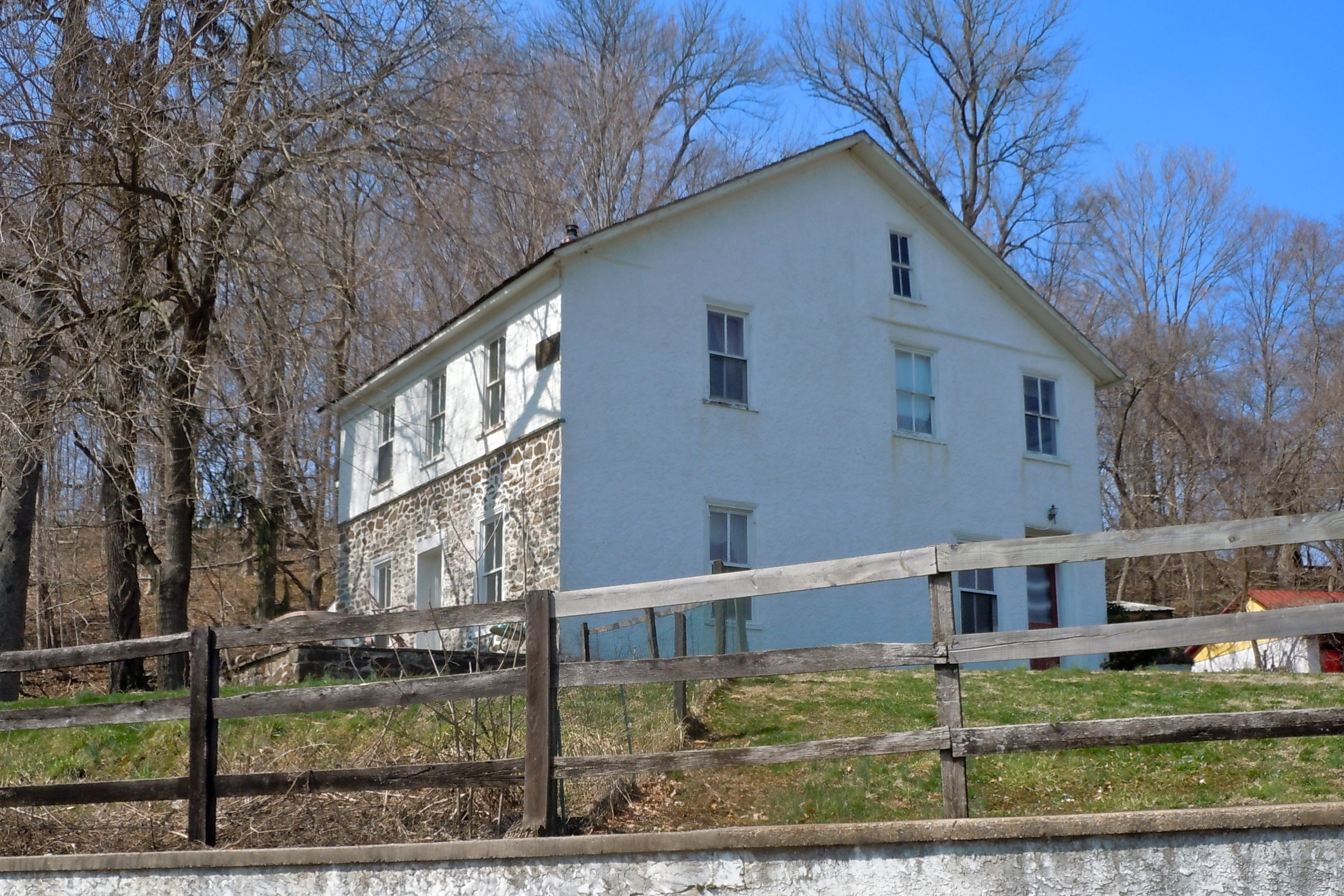
House at Derbydown, March 2011
