= John Beale Bordley =

American planter and judge (1727-1804)

- Portrait by Charles Willson Peale, c. 1770

Provincial Court judge
- In office 1766–1776
- Appointed by: Horatio Sharpe; Sir Robert Eden, 1st Baronet

Admiralty Court judge
- In office 1767–1776
- Appointed by: Horatio Sharpe; Sir Robert Eden, 1st Baronet

Personal details
- Born: February 11, 1727 Annapolis, Colony of Maryland, British America
- Died: January 26, 1804 (aged 76) Philadelphia, Pennsylvania, U.S.
- Resting place: St. Peter's Churchyard in Philadelphia, Pennsylvania, U.S.
- Citizenship: American
- Spouse(s): Margaret Chew; Sarah Fishbourne Mifflin
- Children: Thomas Bordley (1755-1771), Matthias Bordley (1757–1818), Henrietta Maria Bordley (born 1762), John Beale Bordley Jr. (1764–1815), Elizabeth Bordley (1777–1863)
- Occupation: Farmer
- Profession: Lawyer

John Beale Bordley (February 11, 1727 – January 26, 1804) was an American planter and judge.

== Early life and education ==
Bordley was born on February 11, 1727, in Annapolis, in the Colony of Maryland, the son of Thomas Bordley, from Yorkshire, England, the attorney general for the Colony of Maryland, and his second wife Ariana Vanderheyden. A half-sister, through his mother's subsequent marriage to Edmund Jenings (1703-1756), was Ariana Jenings Randolph, the wife of Virginia loyalist John Randolph, making Bordley the uncle of the first Attorney General of the United States, Edmund Randolph.

He was educated at the library of his step brother, Stephan Hadley, At the age to ten, he went to live with his uncle in Chestertown. He received his early education under the direction of the Chestertown Free School teacher, Charles Peale.

== Career ==
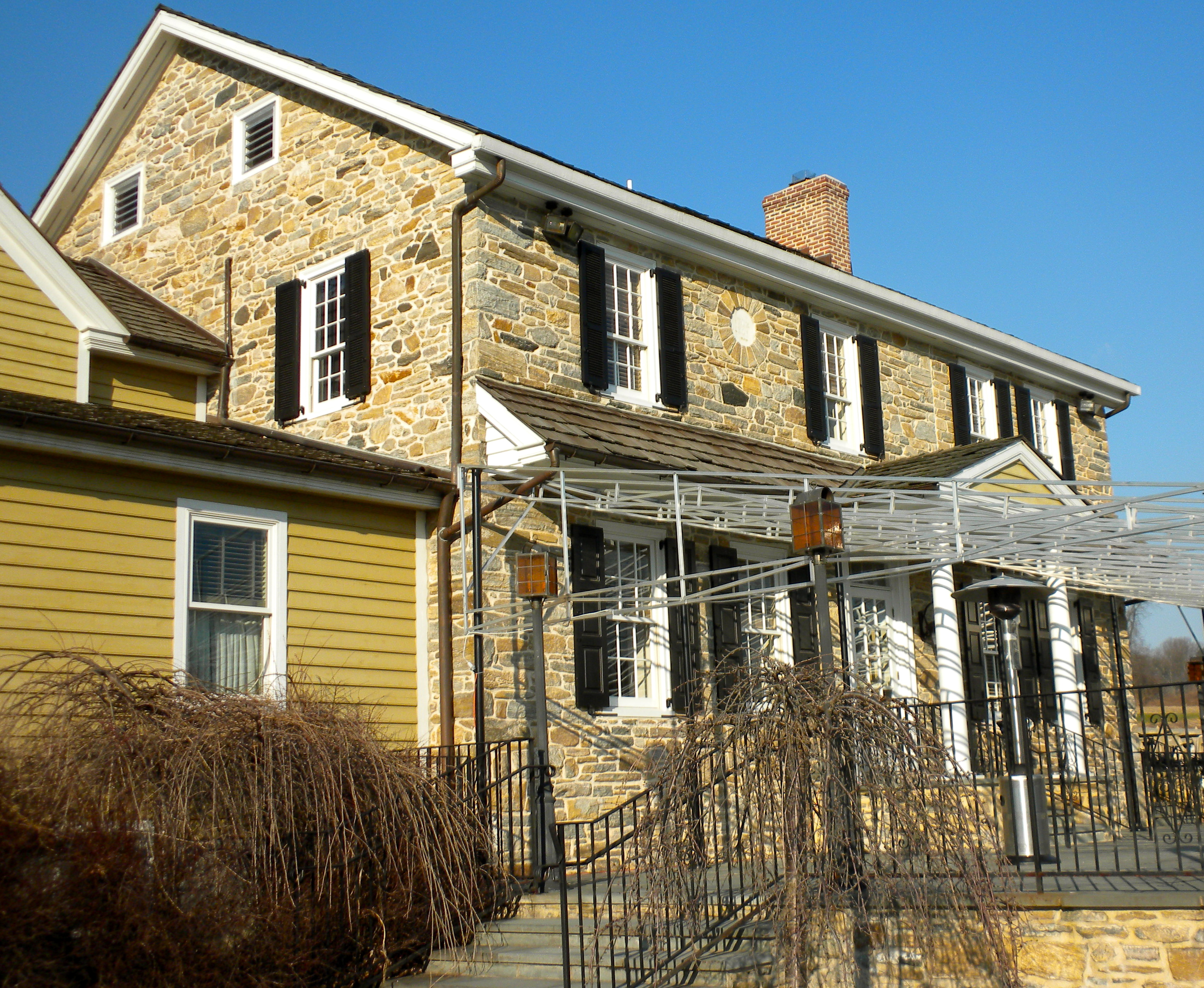
Como Farm in 2009

He initially lived in Joppa, Maryland, then the county seat of Baltimore County, Maryland. For the next 12 or 13 years, he worked his plantation, and held the county. clerkship.

In 1768, he was one of the commissioners to help determine the boundary between Maryland and Delaware.

On September 25, 1770, he was present at the Upper House of Assembly of Maryland. Later he moved to Baltimore City, where he was appointed a judge of the Provincial Court, and judge of the British Admiralty Court.

He served as a member of Governor Horatio Sharpe's and Governor Sir Robert Eden, 1st Baronet, of Maryland's Councils.

In 1785, he encouraged the formation of the Philadelphia Society for Promoting Agriculture. The archives of the society are held at the Van Pelt-Dietrich Library Center, University of Pennsylvania.

He developed an eight field system, which included three fields of clover in the rotation plan. He had hit upon the contribution of legumes to the soil. He also experimented with hemp, cotton, fruits, many kinds of vegetables, and animal husbandry. He established a profitable wheat trade with England and Spain, turning away from tobacco cultivation. Washington corresponded with him about wheat.

== Art ==
He was a childhood friend of Charles Willson Peale, whose father was his tutor. He raised the funds to send Charles Willson Peale to London, where the young artist trained under Benjamin West in 1767, for two years.

Bordley also helped Peale obtain his first major commission in America—two life-size portraits. His grandson, John Beale Bordley] (1800–1882), was also an artist, who studied with Peale.

== Works ==
- A summary View Of The Courses of Crops, In The Husbandry of England and Maryland, (1784)
- Sketches on Rotations of Crops and Other Rural Matters, (1797).
- Country Habitations, (1798)
- Essays and Notes on Husbandry and Rural Affairs, (1799), with additions in 1801, 566 pages

== Personal life ==
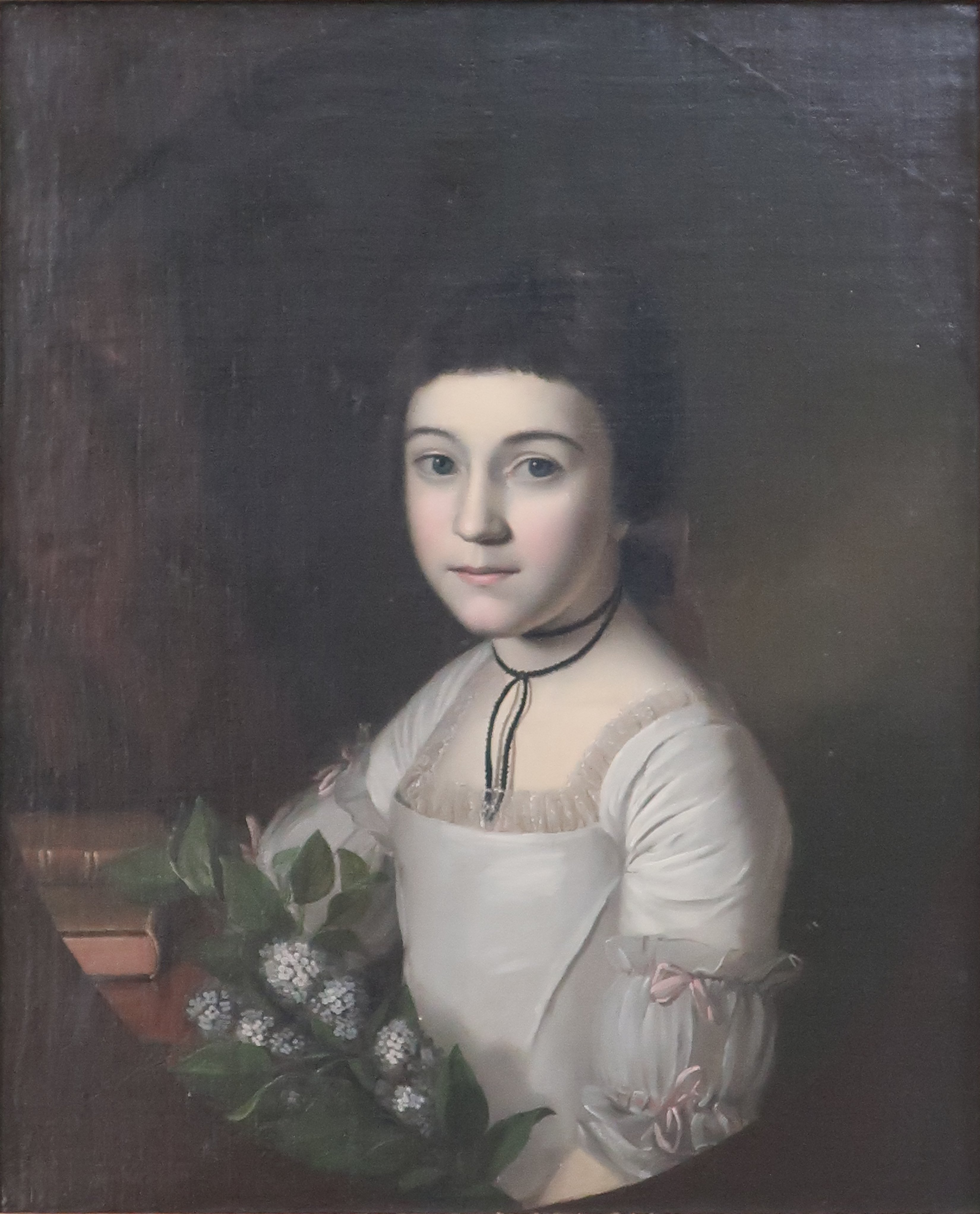
Henrietta Maria Bordley, Bordley's third child born in 1762, at age 10

In 1750, Bordley married Margaret Chew, (June 29, 1735 – November 11, 1773). In 1770, his wife inherited from the Chew family half of Wye Island, in Queen Anne's County, on the Chesapeake Bay, with the other half going to his sister-in-law, Mary, wife of William Paca. The Bordleys maintained their winter residence in Annapolis, Maryland, and moved to his estate on Wye Island. They had four children: Thomas Bordley (born 1755- 1771), Matthias Bordley (born 1757–1818), Henrietta Maria Bordley (born 1762), John Beale Bordley Jr. (born 1764–1815)

After Margaret died, in 1777, he married Mrs. John Mifflin (Sarah Fishbourne) (October 20, 1733 – May 16, 1816), a widow from Philadelphia. He became stepfather to Thomas Mifflin. Then the Bordley family wintered in Philadelphia, and a large farm in Chester County, Pennsylvania, called Como Farm. In 1783, he was elected a member of the American Philosophical Society. They had the daughter Elizabeth Bordley (1777–1863).

== Death and legacy ==
Portrait by Charles Willson Peale, c. 1790

Bordley died January 26, 1804, in Philadelphia, at age 76, and is interred in St. Peter's Churchyard in Philadelphia. Como Farm is now a golf course.
