= Marshallton, Chester County, Pennsylvania =

Unincorporated community in Pennsylvania, US

Marshallton, Pennsylvania
- Unincorporated community and Census-designated place
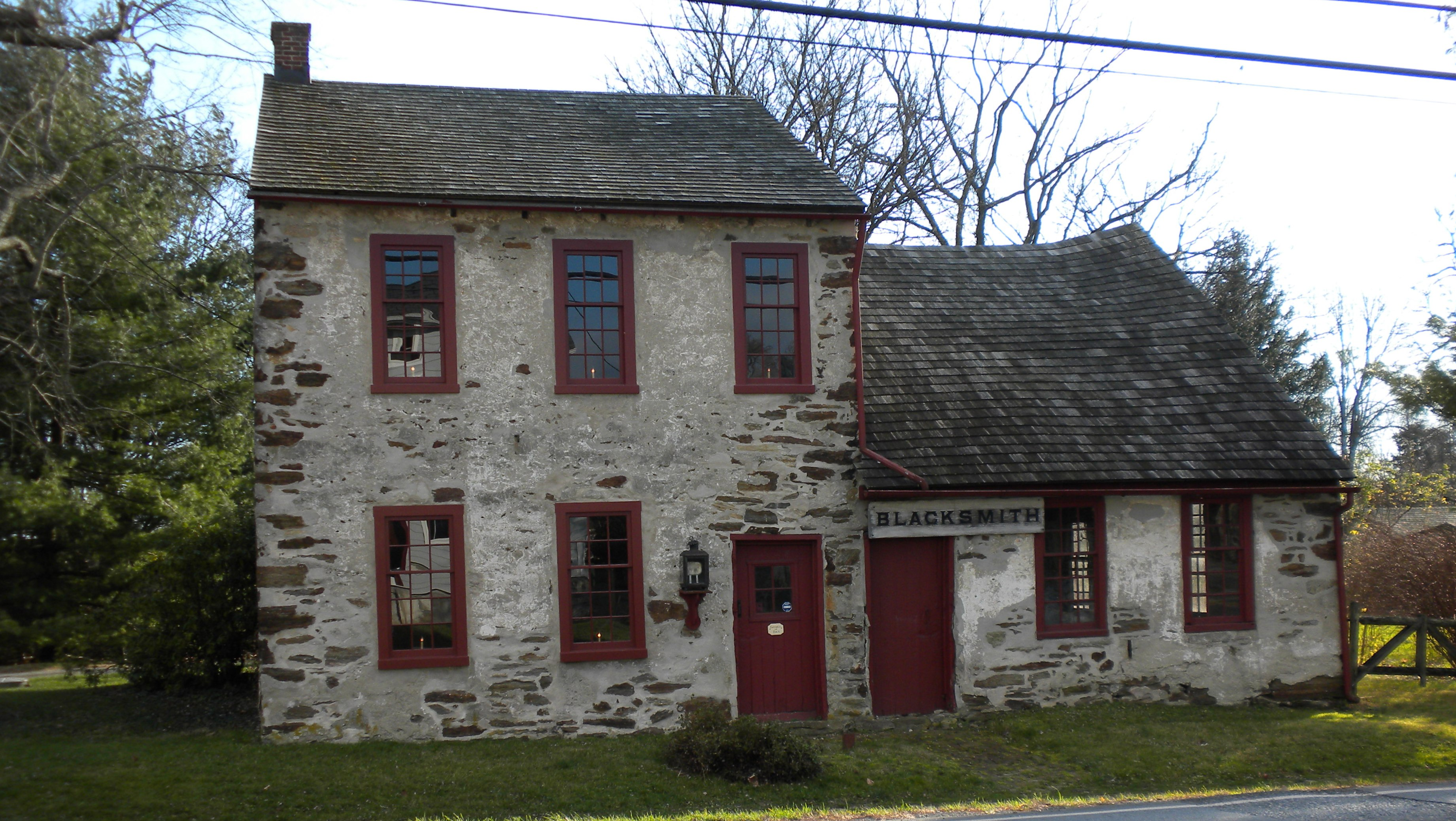
- Blacksmith in Marshallton

- Location in Chester County and the U.S. state of Pennsylvania

- Location within the state of Pennsylvania
- Coordinates: 39°56′59″N 75°40′49″W
- Country: United States
- State: Pennsylvania
- County: Chester
- Township: West Bradford

Population (2020)
  - Total: 500
- Time zone: UTC-5 (Eastern (EST))
  - Summer (DST): UTC-4 (EDT)
- ZIP codes: 19382
- Area code: 610
- Marshallton Historic District
- U.S. National Register of Historic Places
- U.S. Historic district
- Location within Pennsylvania Location within the United States
- Location: Strasburg Road, Marshallton, Pennsylvania
- Coordinates: 39°56′59″N 75°40′49″W
- Area: 102 acres (41 ha)
- Architectural style: Mid 19th Century Revival, Colonial, Federal
- NRHP reference No.: 86000056
- Added to NRHP: January 8, 1986

Marshallton is an unincorporated community, census designated place, and federal historic district in West Bradford Township, Pennsylvania, United States. As of 2020, the CDP had a population of 500. It is one of three historic districts in West Bradford Township that are on the National Register of Historic Places. The village is largely known for its historic buildings, some notable restaurants, and the nearby Highland Orchards.

== History ==
The Marshallton Historic District encompasses 65 contributing buildings and three contributing sites. It includes the separately listed Humphry Marshall House, Marshalton Inn, and Bradford Friends Meetinghouse.

It was added to the National Register of Historic Places in 1986.
