= John C. Haas =

American businessman

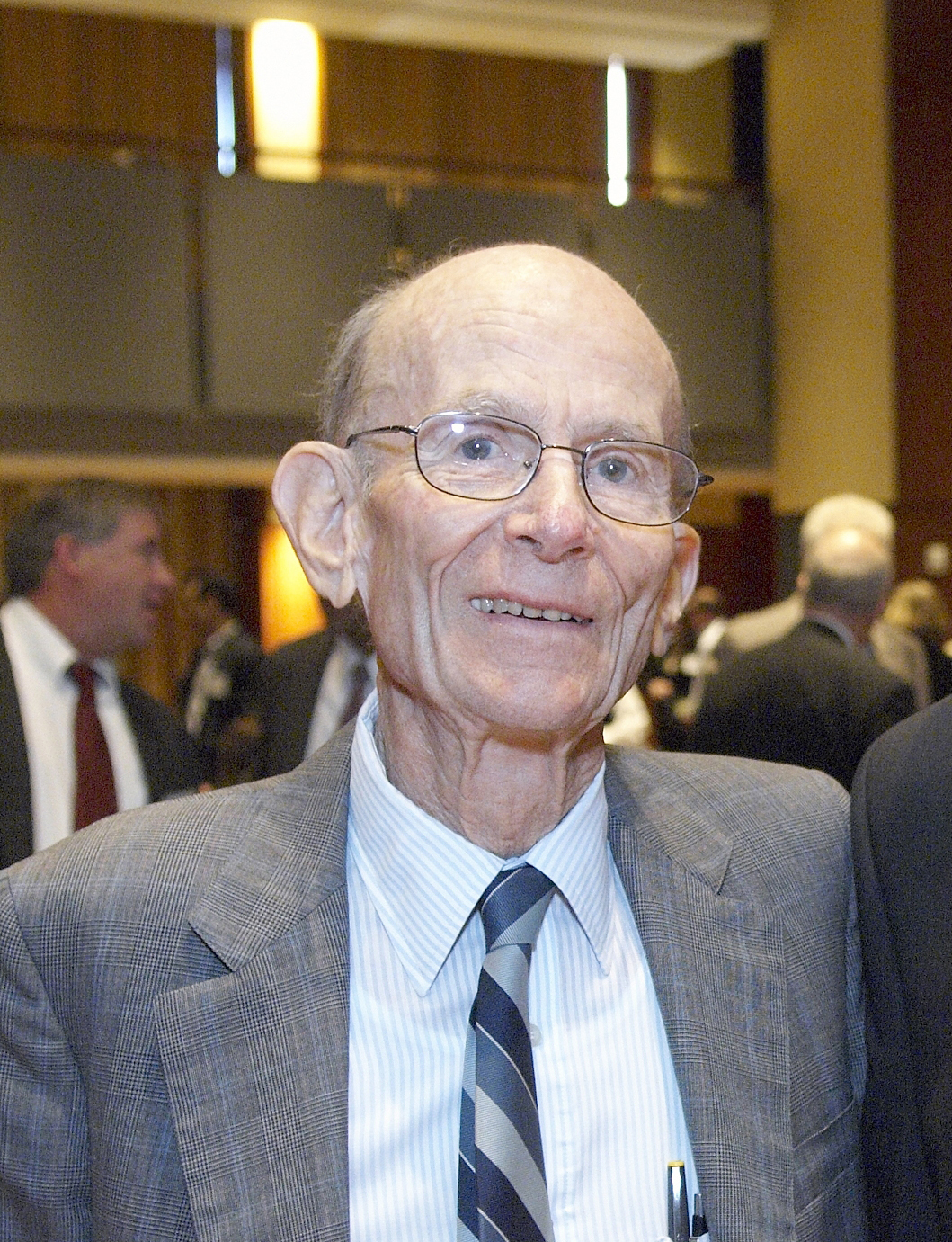
- Chemical Heritage Foundation, 2005
- Born: John Charles Haas; May 22, 1918; Haverford, Pennsylvania
- Died: April 2, 2011 (aged 92); Villanova, Pennsylvania
- Education: Amherst College; Massachusetts Institute of Technology
- Spouse: Chara A. Haas (nee Cooper) (1952–2011)
- Children: 5
- Scientific career
- Fields: chemical engineering
- Workplaces: Rohm and Haas; United Way; Boys and Girls Club; American Chemical Society; American Institute of Chemical Engineers; William Penn Foundation

John Charles Haas (May 22, 1918 – April 2, 2011) was an American businessman and philanthropist, at one time considered the second richest man in Philadelphia. He was the chairman of global chemical company Rohm and Haas from 1974 to 1978. Under his leadership, the family's William Penn Foundation became a $2 billion grantmaking institution, ranking as one of the largest such institutions in the United States.

== Early life and education ==
Haas was the son of Otto Haas, founder of the chemical company Rohm and Haas, and his wife, astronomer Phoebe Waterman Haas. Rohm and Haas was founded by Otto Haas and Otto Rohm in Germany in 1907. Originally a leather-tanning business, the company expanded into the United States, opening a branch in Philadelphia, Pennsylvania, in 1911. It subsequently became a more broadly based chemical and plastics company.

Haas grew up in Haverford, Pennsylvania, with his parents and his older brother F. Otto Haas. He attended the Quaker Haverford Friends School, and then Episcopal Academy, from which he graduated in 1936.

Haas attended Amherst College, where he received a bachelor's degree in 1940, majoring in chemistry. He then went to the Massachusetts Institute of Technology, receiving a master's degree in chemical engineering in 1942.

== Career and family ==
Haas was employed as a process engineer at Rohm and Haas as of 1942, working at the Bridesburg plant in Philadelphia. After serving in the navy during World War II, he returned to Rohm and Haas in 1946. He worked as a manager in the company's production facilities in Knoxville, Tenn., and Houston, Texas. In Houston, he met his future wife, Chara A. Cooper (1927-2012). The couple were married in Bryn Athyn on June 21, 1952. They later lived in Wyncote, Pennsylvania, and then at Stoneleigh, the Haas family estate in Villanova. They had five children: a daughter, Barbara, and four sons, David, Leonard, Frederick and Duncan.

Haas became vice president in charge of personnel in 1953, a position in which he promoted the advancement of women and minorities. He was named vice chairman of the board in 1959. After his father's death in 1960, Haas became executive vice president, and his brother F. Otto Haas became president and chief executive officer. Haas became chairman in 1974, and served as chairman from 1974 to 1978. After stepping down as chairman, he continued to serve on the board until 1988.

== Philanthropy ==
In 1960, Haas was named chairman of the William Penn Foundation, originally established by his parents in 1945 as the Phoebe Waterman Charitable Foundation, to address post-war social problems.

In 2006, Haas and his wife Chara established their own foundation, the Stoneleigh Foundation. He credits his wife with the inspiration to use their personal fortune to target the needs of vulnerable and underserved children and families.

In 2009, Rohm and Haas was sold to Dow Chemical Co. for $15.3 billion. The sale allowed Haas and other family members to substantially expand their charitable activities, through the William Penn Foundation, and the newly created Wyncote Foundation. The Wyncote Foundation has given substantially to causes such as the United Way of Southeastern Pennsylvania and the Philadelphia Orchestra.

Throughout his life Haas was active with many charitable organizations, including the United Way of Southeastern Pennsylvania, the Boys and Girls Clubs of Philadelphia, the Natural Lands Trust, and the Opportunities Industrialization Center of America, established by Baptist civil rights leader Leon Sullivan. As a civic leader, Haas helped to found the Balch Institute for Ethnic Studies in 1976, served on the board of governors of Temple University Health System, and was a trustee emeritus at the Massachusetts Institute of Technology.

Haas was instrumental in establishing the Center for the History of Chemistry (later the Chemical Heritage Foundation, now the Science History Institute). The John C. Haas Archive of Science and Business at the Chemical Heritage Foundation is named in his honor, and includes the Rohm and Haas Company archives.

Haas and his brother F. Otto Haas received the Edward Powell Memorial Award in 1987 for their philanthropic work in Philadelphia. They donated the award's cash prize to the Philadelphia Committee for the Homeless. Haas was elected to the American Philosophical Society in 1992.

== Political activities ==
Haas was an early opponent of the Vietnam War. Seeing the dangers of the cold war and nuclear proliferation, he generously supported organizations such as Project Ploughshares. Haas co-founded several organizations, including Business Executives for Nuclear Arms Control (BENAC), Professionals for Nuclear Arms Control (PRONAC), and the Project for Nuclear Awareness (PNA). He was instrumental in supporting the Chemical Weapons Convention, signed by President George H. W. Bush and passed through the Senate during President Bill Clinton's term of office. He supported the START Treaty and the defusing of cold war tensions by Mikhail Gorbachev, George Bush Sr., and Bill Clinton, and the bipartisan New START Treaty passed by the U.S. Senate and President Obama in 2010. Since 2008, the John C. & Chara C. Haas Award for International Peace and Social Justice has been awarded in the names of the Haas's.

== Conservation ==
He was also an active proponent of conservation. In 2009 he and his wife gave a 160-acre hamlet known as Waterloo Mills, in Easttown Township, Chester County, to the Brandywine Conservancy for permanent preservation. They also entrusted 200 acres near Waterloo Mills to the Conservancy. Another 35 acres, with a mansion, were given to Episcopal Academy for a Lower School campus. Initiatives supported by the William Penn Foundation have included grants to Fairmount Park in Philadelphia, and the development of the Delaware River waterfront.

As of April 20, 2016, the Haas family donated the 42-acre Stoneleigh estate in Villanova, including its Tudor Revival mansion, to Natural Lands. The garden was originally planned by the Olmsted Brothers, landscape architects John Charles Olmsted and Frederick Law Olmsted Jr. in a naturalistic style. In developing the garden, Natural Lands has emphasized native plants and sustainable ecological design. The decorative rabbits, which are a popular feature of the estate, will remain and, in fact, were refurbished as the original sculpture was rotting after years of outdoor exposure. The Main House was fully renovated to serve as offices and event space for Natural Lands' staff and to house the Organ Historical Society's library and archives.

== Later life ==
Haas died of natural causes on April 2, 2011, at the age of 92.
