= Stroud Water Research Center =

Nonprofit organization in Avondale, Pennsylvania

- Nickname: Stroud Center
- Established: 1967; 59 years ago
- Founders: Ruth Patrick, William Bolton Dixon Stroud, Joan Milliken Stroud
- Location: Avondale, Pennsylvania
- Fields: freshwater research, environmental education, and watershed restoration
- Website: stroudcenter.org

The Stroud Water Research Center (the Stroud Center) is a not-for-profit organization performing freshwater research, environmental education, and watershed restoration; it is headquartered in Avondale, Pennsylvania. It was co-founded in 1967 by American scientist Ruth Patrick and philanthropists William Bolton Dixon Stroud and Joan Milliken Stroud. Studies at Stroud Water Research Center have contributed to the disciplines of river ecosystems and ecosystem ecology; it is the 14th ranked water security think tank in the U.S. according to the 2020 Global Go To Think Tank Index published by the Lauder Institute of the University of Pennsylvania.

== History ==
In 1967 Ruth Patrick, chair of the Department of Limnology at the Academy of Natural Sciences of Philadelphia, cooperated with landowners William Bolton Dixon Stroud (who also served on the board of the Academy of Natural Sciences in Philadelphia) and his wife Joan Milliken Stroud to establish a research laboratory on the Stroud's property adjoining White Clay Creek in Chester County, Pennsylvania. White Clay Creek was recognized at that time by the Commonwealth of Pennsylvania as an exceptional value stream, and its relatively unpolluted condition was valued by Patrick as a research site which could be compared and contrasted with more polluted streams she had been researching. The Stroud's donated the land for the Stroud Center and also established hundreds of acres of conservation easement throughout the 1800 acre watershed upstream.

In hiring staff for the newly created Stroud Center, Patrick brought together ecologists, chemists, entomologists, hydrologists, and fisheries scientists. She hired Robin Vannote, formerly a scientist for the Tennessee Valley Authority, as the first director in 1969 and at the same time took on Bernard Sweeney as a graduate student (he would later succeed Vannote as director). In 1999, the Stroud Center separated from the Academy of Natural Sciences of Philadelphia and became an independent 501(c)(3) not-for-profit organization.

== Work ==
Patrick's vision for the Stroud Center was to perform theoretical research on aquatic ecosystems that also had practical applications for solving environmental problems. Early research at the Stroud Center led by Vannote resulted in the River Continuum Concept. The development and testing of predictions stemming from this concept played a major role in the study of river ecosystems. The thermal equilibrium concept also emerged from the Stroud Center as a project of Sweeney and Vannote.

Many types of pollutants and their effects on aquatic ecosystems have been investigated at the Stroud Center. Research has tests for chemicals, pharmaceuticals, and contaminants in water supply systems for the Christina River and traced where they come from. Other research investigated the condition of the streams and lakes that provide drinking water to New York City. Studies have investigated the effects of insecticides on fish and plants in the Susquehanna River, and the effect of chlorofluorocarbon refrigerant residues and genetically engineered microbes on waterways. The Stroud Center performed research examining the effect of fracking wastewater on stream insects and fish and has conducted studies on the effect of road de-icing salt on stream organisms. Research at the Stroud Center has extended to the Amazon River, the Schuylkill River, and tropical streams in Costa Rica.

The Stroud Center received funding from the National Science Foundation and the US Forest Service to study carbon dynamics in streams. It also contributed to the National Science Foundation's Christina River Basin Critical Zone Observatory to understand biogeochemical processes at the interface between Earth's surface and subsurface. The Stroud Center developed technology for wirelessly transmitting water quality data using solar-powered devices at low cost, with up to 100 of these devices installed in the Delaware River watershed.

The Stroud Center has conducted research on riparian buffer effectiveness in protecting streams from pollutants and increasing the capacity of streams to degrade pollution. This research has helped identify which riparian tree species are best to plant in attempts to restore streams. Some of this research on the connection between streams and riparian forests was funded by the National Science Foundation. As of 2008, the Stroud Center had helped plant over 100,000 trees. Financial support from Pennsylvania Department of Conservation and Natural Resources funded additional tree plantings in 2017. The Stroud Center partnered with the Natural Resources Conservation Service's Regional Conservation Partnership Program in Berks and Chester Counties, Pennsylvania, to help farmers receive tax credits for conservation projects like riparian buffers that they implemented on their farms. Research on the role of soil health and conservation agriculture are also conducted at the Stroud Center.

The Stroud Center initiated an education program in 1991 to serve students, teachers, and the public, including training conservation professionals across the U.S., South America, and Central America on how to protect waterways that provide them drinking water. Field trips at the Stroud Center introduce students to stream ecology and its connection with riparian forests. An expansion of facilities in 1995 was anticipated to allow 5,000 elementary and high school students per year to participate in classroom and field experiences. The Stroud Center developed the Leaf Pack kit as an educational product that is sold by Lamotte Company. The 2007 Mountaintop to Tap project organized by the Stroud Center led 12 high school students from New York on an 80-mile backpacking trip through the Catskill Mountains and rowed down the Hudson River.

== Facilities ==
A meeting facility was added in 1976 that emulated the style of a Quaker Meeting House, and new labs and classrooms were added in 1995. A greenhouse-like streamhouse was added to the Stroud Center in 1999 that features artificial streams fed by water from White Clay Creek; this facility can be used for research on stream sediment, contaminants, plants, and animals. The Moorhead Environmental Complex was added in 2013, a LEED Platinum building certified by the U.S. Green Building Council and verified by the Green Business Certification Institute. Total facility space at the Stroud Center is 24,820 square feet.

Stroud Preserve, established by Morris W. Stroud near West Chester, PA, was specified as an additional research site for the Stroud Center, although management and ownership of the land was given to Natural Lands.

Under the direction of Bernard Sweeney, Stroud Water Research Center established the Maritza Biological Station in the Guanacaste Conservation Area of Costa Rica. The streams in that region are relatively undisturbed and thereby provide a benchmark for scientists at the Stroud Center to compare their chemistry and biology against polluted streams elsewhere.

== Leadership ==
David B. Arscott replaced Bernard W. Sweeney as executive director following Sweeney's promotion to distinguished research scientist in 2017. Sweeney guided the Stroud Center's independence from the Academy of Natural Sciences and succeeded Robin Vannote as director in 1988.

== Recognition and awards ==
- 2002 Stroud Water Research Center was awarded a Telly Award for its film The Wisdom of Water, written and produced by Richard Robinson of Silverwood Films; the film reviews the history of research and education at the center.
- 2017: The Pennsylvania Governor's Award for Environmental Excellence was awarded to Stroud Water Research Center for its WikiWatershed website.
- 2019: The Philadelphia Sustainable Business Network awarded Stroud Water Research Center the Excellence in Green Stormwater Infrastructure Award for WikiWatershed website.
- 2020: The non-profit documentary filmmakers Visionaries, Inc., produced Flow of Life documenting the Stroud Center.
