= Gibson's Covered Bridge =

- U.S. National Register of Historic Places
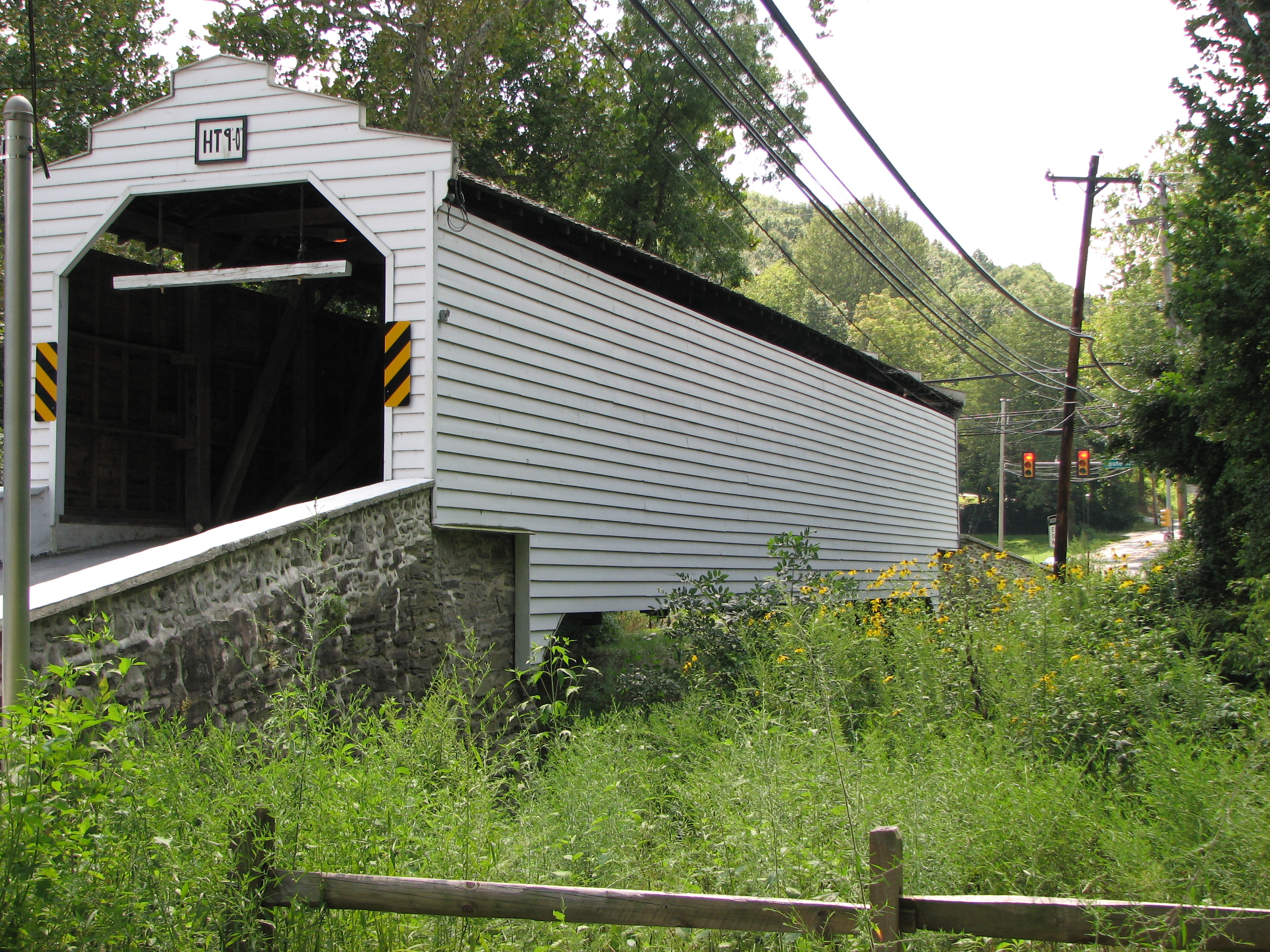
- Gibson's Covered Bridge, August 2008

- Location within Pennsylvania Location within the United States
- Location: Southeast of Downingtown on Township 391, East Bradford Township and West Bradford Township, Pennsylvania
- Coordinates: 39°58′34″N 75°41′0″W
- Area: less than one acre
- Built: 1872
- Built by: Edward H. Hall, Thomas E. Schull
- Architectural style: Burr truss
- MPS: Covered Bridges of Chester County TR
- NRHP reference No.: 80003456
- Added to NRHP: December 10, 1980

Gibson's Covered Bridge, also known as Harmony Hill Bridge, is an historic, wooden, covered bridge which is located in East Bradford Township and West Bradford Township, Chester County, Pennsylvania.

It was listed on the National Register of Historic Places in 1980.

== History and architectural features ==
A 78-foot-long (24 m) Burr truss bridge, which was erected in 1872, this historic structure features stepped portals and horizontal clapboard siding, and crosses the East Branch Brandywine Creek.

The bridge was damaged and closed by flooding caused by Hurricane Ida on September 1, 2021.
