= Strode's Mill =

- U.S. National Register of Historic Places
- U.S. Historic district – Contributing property
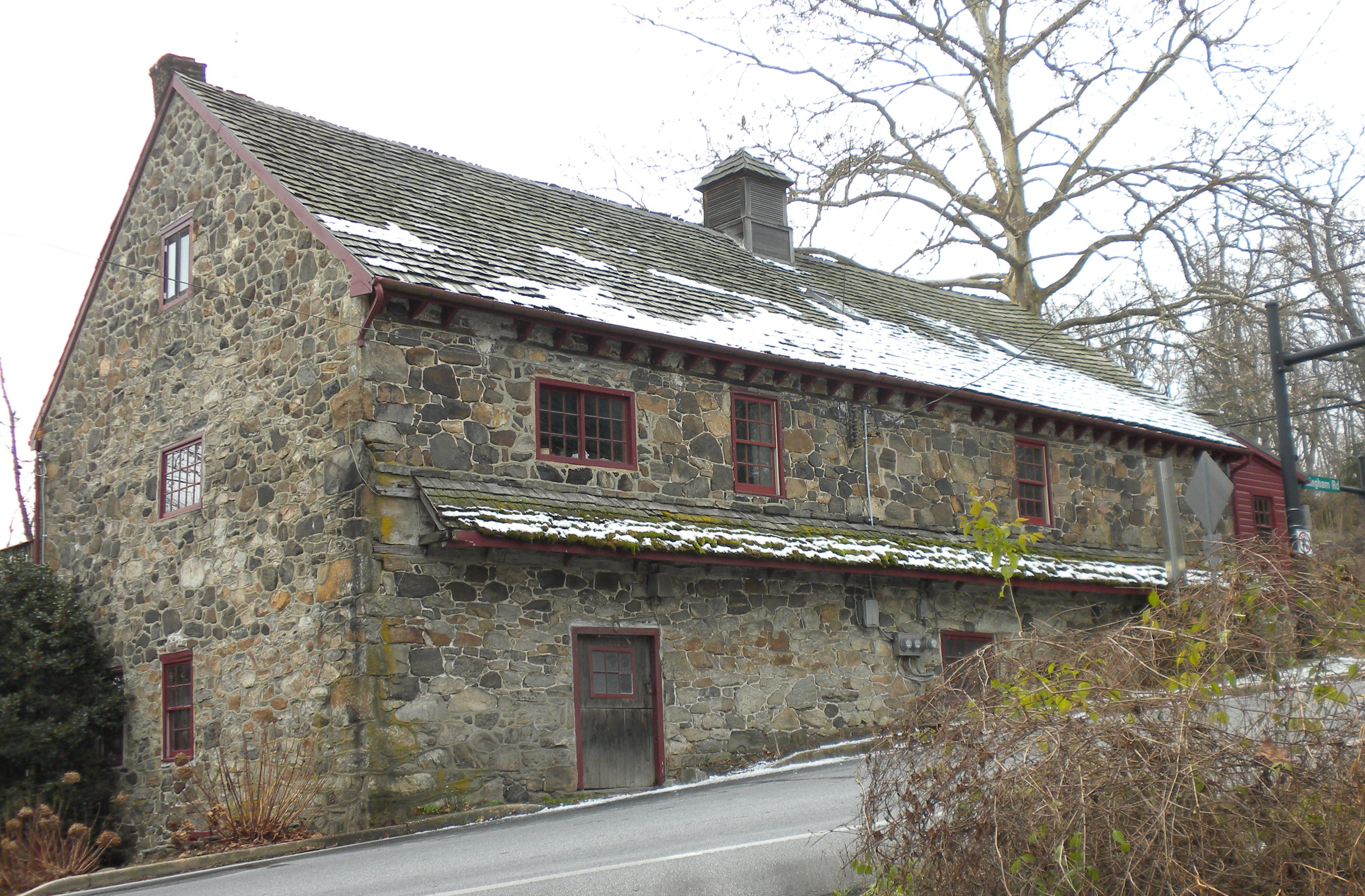
- Strode's Mill, December 2009

- Location within Pennsylvania Location within the United States
- Location: Jct. of PA 100, East Bradford Township, Pennsylvania
- Coordinates: 39°55′43″N 75°37′4″W
- Area: 1 acre (0.40 ha)
- Built: 1721
- Built by: Carter, Scott & Willis
- NRHP reference No.: 71000697
- Added to NRHP: May 27, 1971

Strode's Mill, also known as Etter's Mill, is an historic grist mill in East Bradford Township, Chester County, Pennsylvania, United States.

Located in the Strode's Mill Historic District, it was added to the National Register of Historic Places in 1971.

== History and architectural features ==
Built in 1721, this historic building is a three-and-one-half-story, banked, fieldstone structure. It measures approximately thirty feet by fifty-eight feet and houses a private residence.
