= Worth–Jefferis Rural Historic District =

Historic district in Pennsylvania, United States

- U.S. National Register of Historic Places
- U.S. Historic district
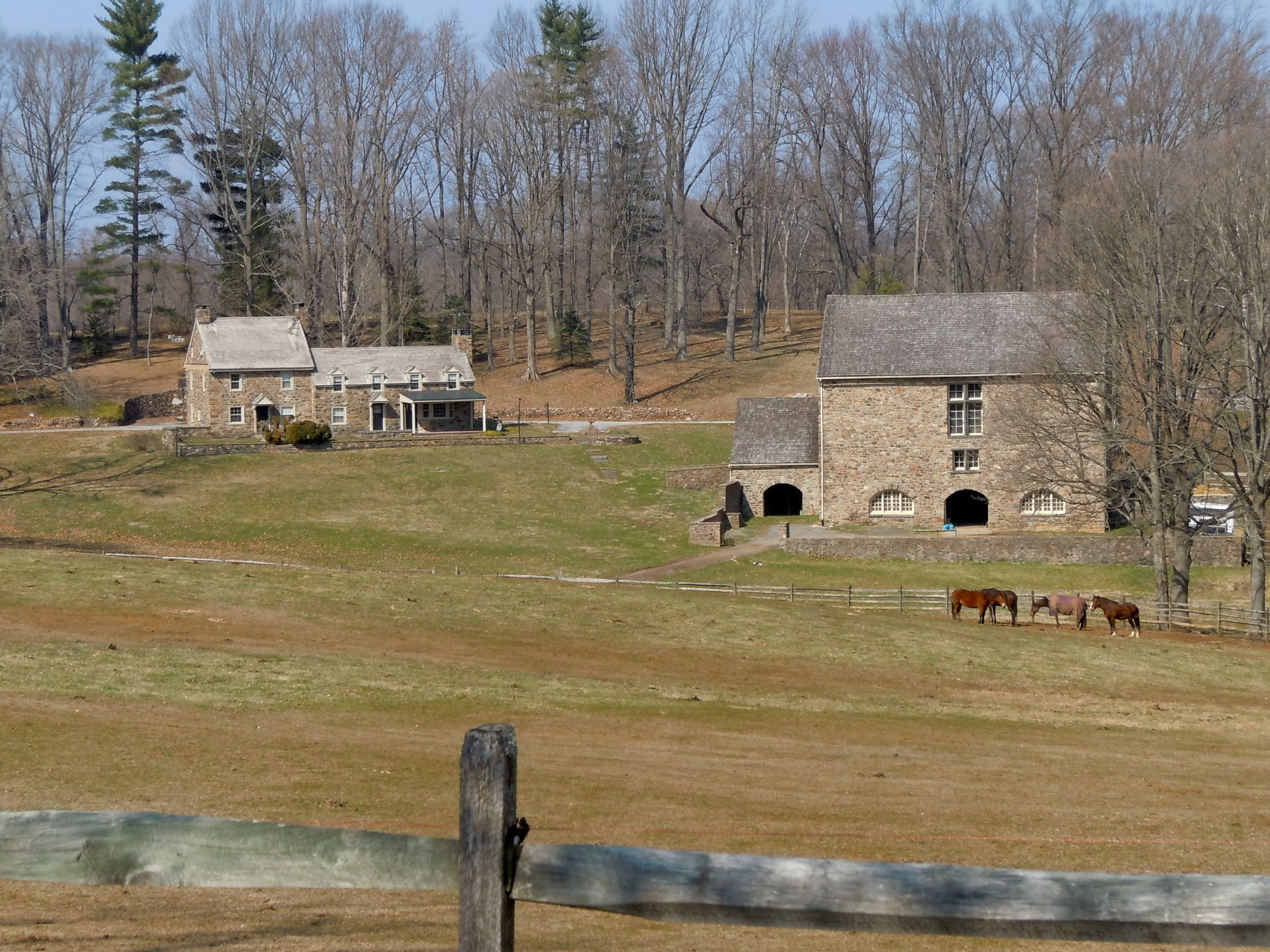
- House and barn in the Worth–Jefferis Rural Historic District, March 2011

- Location within Pennsylvania Location within the United States
- Location: Roughly, along Lucky Hill, N. Wawaset, Allerton and Creek Rds., near Marshallton, East Bradford Township and West Bradford Township, Pennsylvania
- Coordinates: 39°56′15″N 75°39′13″W
- Area: 1,800 acres (730 ha)
- Architectural style: Colonial, Georgian, Colonial Revival
- NRHP reference No.: 95000523
- Added to NRHP: April 27, 1995

The Worth–Jefferis Rural Historic District is a national historic district that is located in East Bradford Township and West Bradford Township, Chester County, Pennsylvania.

It was added to the National Register of Historic Places in 1995.

== History and architectural features ==
This district encompasses forty-two contributing buildings and five contributing sites that are located in rural Chester County. It includes a variety of vernacular stone farmhouses, Pennsylvania bank barns, and farm outbuildings.

Notable properties include the Georgia Farm (1740), the Glen-Worth Farm, the Barr Farm, the Lucky Hill Farm, the Blue Rock Farm, the Allerton Farm, the Barry Farm, and the Sarah Baldwin Farm. Also located within the district is the separately listed Carter-Worth House and Farm.
