= East Bradford Township, Pennsylvania =

Township in Pennsylvania, US

East Bradford Township
- Township
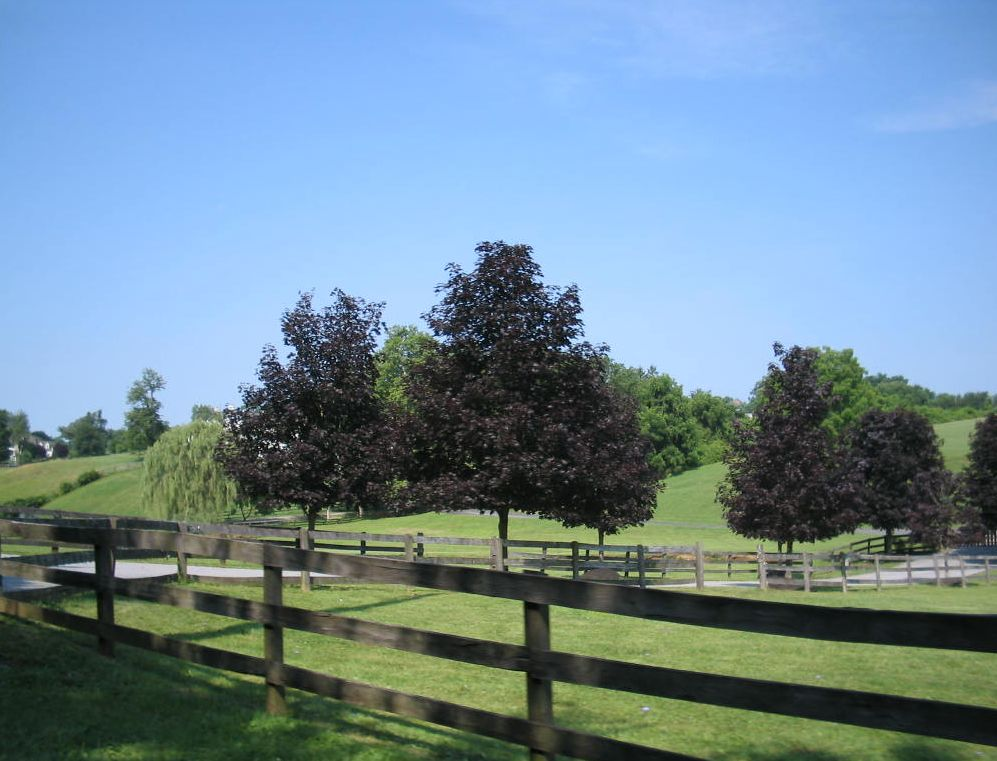
- A farm estate in East Bradford Township

- Seal

- Location of East Bradford Township in Chester County (top) and of Chester County in Pennsylvania (below)

- Location of Pennsylvania in the United States
- Coordinates: 39°56′48″N 75°38′24″W
- Country: United States
- State: Pennsylvania
- County: Chester

Area
  - Total: 15.15 sq mi (39.25 km^{2})
  - Land: 14.93 sq mi (38.68 km^{2})
  - Water: 0.22 sq mi (0.57 km^{2})
- Elevation: 207 ft (63 m)

Population (2020)
  - Total: 10,335 ▲
  - Estimate (2023): 10,934
  - Density: 669.4/sq mi (258.44/km^{2})
- Time zone: UTC-5 (EST)
  - Summer (DST): UTC-4 (EDT)
- Area code: 610
- FIPS code: 42-029-20824
- Website: www.eastbradford.org

East Bradford Township is a township in Chester County, Pennsylvania, United States. The population was 10,335 at the 2020 census.

== History ==
The Cope's Bridge, Gibson's Covered Bridge, Worth-Jefferis Rural Historic District, Carter-Worth House and Farm, East Bradford Boarding School for Boys, Hance House and Barn, Col. John Hannum House, Paradise Valley Historic District, Strode's Mill, Strode's Mill Historic District, Taylor–Cope Historic District, and Taylor House are listed on the National Register of Historic Places.

== Geography ==
According to the U.S. Census Bureau, the township has a total area of 15.1 square miles (39 km^{2}), of which 15.0 square miles (39 km^{2}) is land and 0.07% is water.

Adjacent townships

- East Caln Township (north)
- West Whiteland Township (northeast)
- West Goshen Township (east)
- Westtown Township (southeast)
- Birmingham Township (south)
- Pocopson Township (southwest)
- West Bradford Township (west)

West Chester, the county seat, is on the east side, between East Bradford and West Goshen townships.

== Demographics ==
Historical population
Census	Pop.	Note	%±
1930	906		—
1940	1,033		14.0%
1950	1,187		14.9%
1960	1,713		44.3%
1970	3,260		90.3%
1980	3,219		−1.3%
1990	6,440		100.1%
2000	9,405		46.0%
2010	9,942		5.7%
2020	10,335		4.0%
2023 (est.)	10,934		5.8%

At the 2010 census, the township was 91.5% non-Hispanic White, 3.3% Black or African American, 0.1% Native American, 2.0% Asian, and 1.4% were two or more races. 2.0% of the population were of Hispanic or Latino ancestry.

As of the census of 2000, there were 9,405 people, 3,076 households, and 2,408 families residing in the township. The population density was 625.6 inhabitants per square mile (241.5/km^{2}). There were 3,150 housing units at an average density of 209.5 per square mile (80.9/km^{2}). The racial makeup of the township was 93.45% White, 3.49% African American, 0.17% Native American, 1.87% Asian, 0.05% Pacific Islander, 0.40% from other races, and 0.56% from two or more races. Hispanic or Latino of any race were 1.40% of the population.

There were 3,076 households, out of which 41.1% had children under the age of 18 living with them, 70.7% were married couples living together, 5.3% had a female householder with no husband present, and 21.7% were non-families. 16.6% of all households were made up of individuals, and 3.8% had someone living alone who was 65 years of age or older. The average household size was 2.84 and the average family size was 3.24.

In the township the population was spread out, with 27.4% under the age of 18, 9.2% from 18 to 24, 28.2% from 25 to 44, 26.0% from 45 to 64, and 9.1% who were 65 years of age or older. The median age was 37 years. For every 100 females, there were 92.0 males. For every 100 females age 18 and over, there were 87.7 males.

The median income for a household in the township was $100,732, and the median income for a family was $109,459. Males had a median income of $82,811 versus $38,220 for females. The per capita income for the township was $41,158. About 0.9% of families and 2.0% of the population were below the poverty line, including 0.7% of those under age 18 and 2.3% of those age 65 or over.

== Schools ==
The township is served by the West Chester Area School District. Elementary schools serving sections of East Bradford township include East Bradford, Hillsdale, Mary C. Howse, and Sarah Starkweather. Almost all areas of East Bradford township are zoned to Pierce Middle School and West Chester Henderson High School, while a small portion is zoned to G.A. Stetson Middle School and Rustin High School.

A portion of West Chester University South Campus is in East Bradford Township.

== Transportation ==
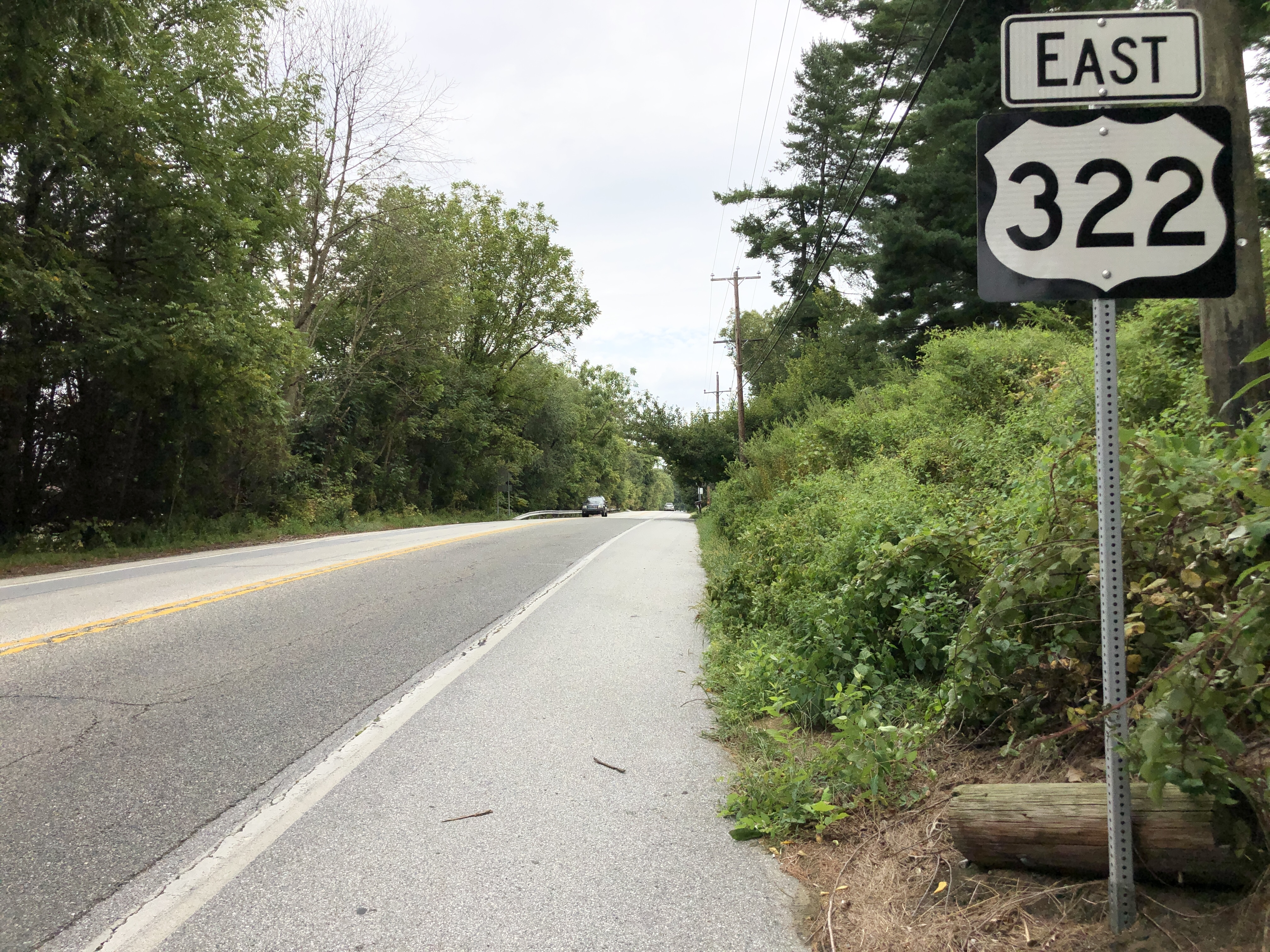
US 322 eastbound in East Bradford Township

As of 2020, there were 75.15 miles (120.94 km) of public roads in East Bradford Township, of which 18.43 miles (29.66 km) were maintained by the Pennsylvania Department of Transportation (PennDOT) and 56.72 miles (91.28 km) were maintained by the township.

Numbered highways serving East Bradford Township include U.S. Route 322, U.S. Route 322 Business, Pennsylvania Route 52, Pennsylvania Route 162 and Pennsylvania Route 842. US 322 follows West Chester Bypass and Downingtown Pike along an east-west alignment through the central portion of the township. US 322 Business begins at the western end of West Chester Bypass and heads southeast along the Downingtown Pike in the eastern portion of the township. PA 52 follows Lenape Road along a northeast-southwest alignment through the southeastern portion of the township. PA 162 follows Strasburg Road along an east-west alignment through the central portion of the township, just south of US 322. Finally, PA 842 follows Bridge Road, Creek Road and West Miner Street along a southwest-northeast alignment through southern and eastern portions of the township.

== Notable people ==
- Richard J. Baldwin (1853–1944), Pennsylvania State Senator and Representative
- Gilbert Cope (1840–1928), genealogist and historian of Chester County, Pennsylvania
- Eli Kirk Price (1797–1884), Pennsylvania State Senator, commissioner of Fairmount Park in Philadelphia
