= Ruth Patrick =

American botanist and limnologist (1907–2013)

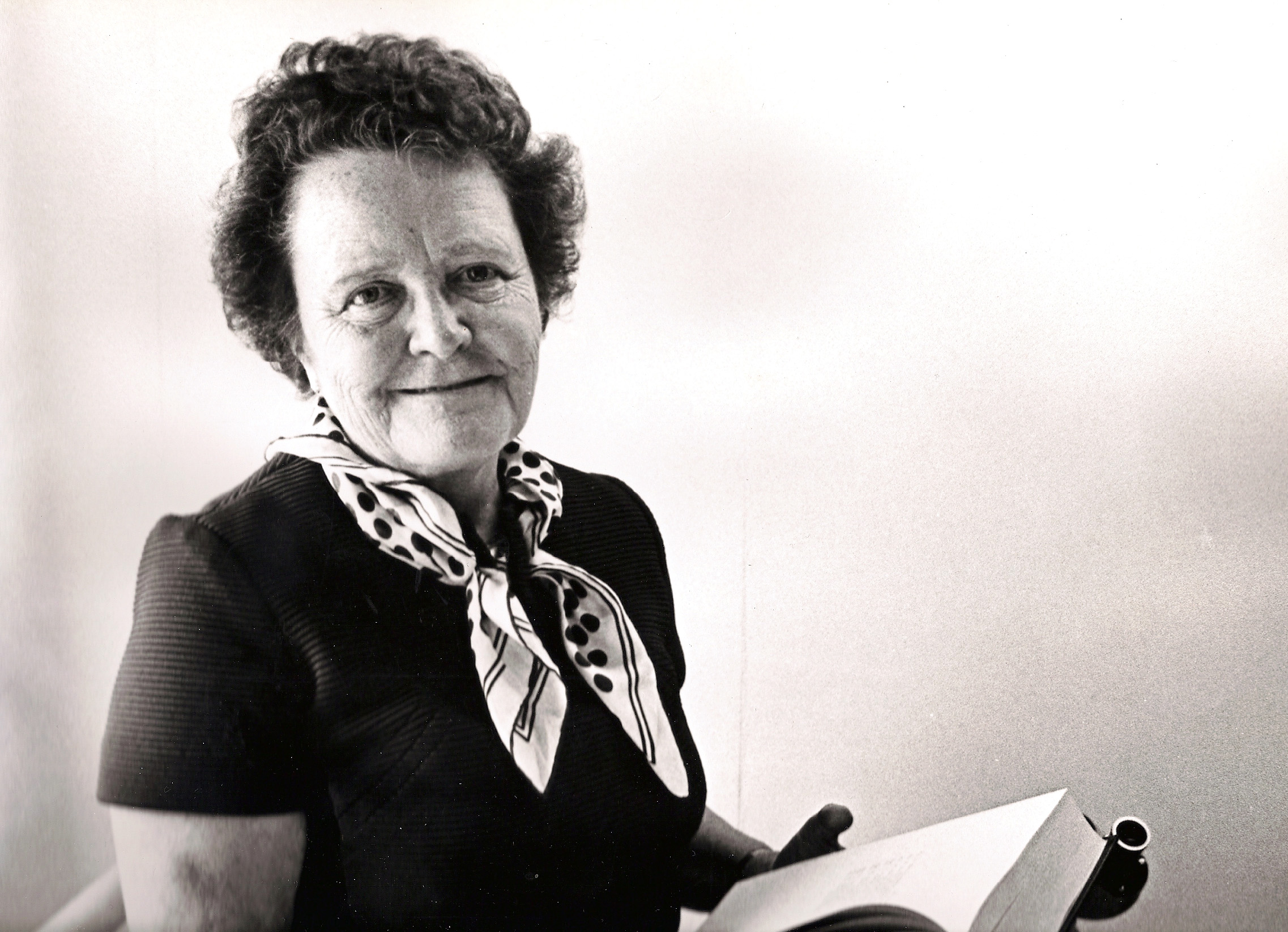
- Patrick in 1975
- Born: November 26, 1907; Topeka, Kansas, U.S.
- Died: September 23, 2013 (aged 105); Lafayette Hill, Pennsylvania, U.S.
- Education: University of Virginia
- Awards: National Medal of Science; Lewis L. Dollinger Pure Environment Award (1970)
- Scientific career
- Fields: Botanist and Limnologist
- Workplaces: Academy of Natural Sciences
- Author abbrev. (botany): R.M.Patrick

Ruth Myrtle Patrick (November 26, 1907 – September 23, 2013) was an American botanist and limnologist specializing in diatoms and freshwater ecology. She authored more than 200 scientific papers, developed ways to measure the health of freshwater ecosystems and established numerous research facilities.

== Early life and education ==
Ruth Patrick was the daughter of Frank Patrick, a banker, and lawyer. Frank had a degree in botany from Cornell University in Ithaca, New York, and was a hobbyist scientist. He often took Ruth and her sister on Sunday afternoons to collect specimens, especially diatoms, from streams. This sparked a lifelong interest in diatoms and ecology. Ruth Patrick recalls that she "collected everything: worms, mushrooms, plants, rocks. I remember the feeling I got when my father would roll back the top of his big desk in the library and roll out the microscope... it was miraculous, looking through a window at the whole other world." Ruth attended the Sunset Hill School in Kansas City, Missouri, graduating in 1925. Ruth's mother insisted that she attend Coker College, a women's school in Hartsville, South Carolina, but her father arranged for her to attend summer courses, through fear that Coker would not provide satisfactory education in the sciences. When she graduated in 1929, she then enrolled in the University of Virginia, earning a master's degree in 1931, followed by a Ph.D. in 1934.

== Career ==
External videos
- Scientific Pioneer Ruth Patrick, 4:53, Philadelphia:The Great Experiment

Patrick's research in fossilized diatoms showed that the Great Dismal Swamp between Virginia and North Carolina was once a forest, which had been flooded by seawater. Similar research proved that the Great Salt Lake was not always a saline lake. During the Great Depression, she volunteered to work as a curator of microscopy for the Academy of Natural Sciences, where she worked for no pay for eight years. She was payrolled in 1945. In 1947, she formed and chaired the academy's Department of Limnology. She continued to work there for many years and was regarded as a talented and outstanding scientific administrator, in addition to her other scientific contributions. In 1967, she founded Stroud Water Research Center in collaboration with W.B. Dixon Stroud and his wife Joan Milliken Stroud; this facility was located on the Stroud's property adjoining White Clay Creek in Avondale, Pennsylvania

Patrick's work on the Great Salt Lake in the 1930s used the history of diatoms in the sediments of the lake to prove the lake was once a freshwater body of water, and established some solid clues as to what caused the shift to saltwater.

In 1945 she invented the diatometer, a device to take better samples for studying diversity in water ecology. Patrick was a pioneer in the use of biodiversity to determine a body of water's overall health. Her work with both academics and industry giants like DuPont fostered an understanding of pollutants and their effect on rivers, lakes, and drinking water sources. Patrick was an advocate for clean water, including helping develop the guidelines for the US Congress Clean Water Act. President Lyndon B. Johnson sought her expertise on water pollution, and President Ronald Reagan asked for her input on acid rain.

== Awards and honours ==
Her work has been widely published and she has received numerous awards for her scientific achievements. A complete list is available on her institutional page. Highlights include:

- Member of the United States National Academy of Sciences in 1970
- Eminent Ecologist Award from the Ecological Society of America in 1972
- Member of the American Philosophical Society in 1974
- John and Alice Tyler Prize for Environmental Achievement in 1975
- Golden Plate Award of the American Academy of Achievement in 1975
- Fellow of the American Academy of Arts and Sciences in 1976
- Golden Medal of the Royal Zoological Society of Antwerp, Belgium, in 1978
- Honorary Lifetime Membership from the American Society of Naturalists in 1988
- Benjamin Franklin Medal for Distinguished Achievement in the Sciences in 1993
- National Medal of Science in 1996
- A.C. Redfield Lifetime Achievement Award from the American Society of Limnology and Oceanography in 1996
- Mendel Medal from Villanova University (the university's highest honour), 2002
- Heinz Award Chairman's Medal in 2002
- Fellow of the Ecological Society of America, 2012

The Ruth Patrick Science Education Center in Aiken, South Carolina, is named after her. The Association for the Sciences of Limnology and Oceanography gives out a Ruth Patrick Award "to honor outstanding research by a scientist in the application of basic aquatic science principles to the identification, analysis and/or solution of important environmental problems." This botanist is denoted by the author abbreviation R.M.Patrick when citing a botanical name.

On November 17, 2007, a gala was held in honor of. Patrick's upcoming 100th birthday at The Academy of Natural Sciences in Philadelphia, PA. Notable guests included Governor of Pennsylvania Ed Rendell.

Dr Patrick received more than 25 honorary degrees. In 2009, Patrick was inducted into the National Women's Hall of Fame.

== Personal life ==
Patrick was married twice. She retained her maiden name when writing scientific papers, at her father's request. Her husbands were Charles Hodge IV and Lewis H. Van Dusen Jr. With Charles Hodge IV she had one son. Charles was a pediatric gastroenterologist and a direct descendant of Benjamin Franklin.

Patrick died at a retirement home in 2013. She was 105. As a tribute to her father and her childhood in Kansas City, Missouri, Dr. Patrick left most of her library to the Linda Hall Library at her death. These books focus on microscopy and microscopical observations.
