= Paradise Valley Historic District =

Historic district in Pennsylvania, United States

- U.S. National Register of Historic Places
- U.S. Historic district
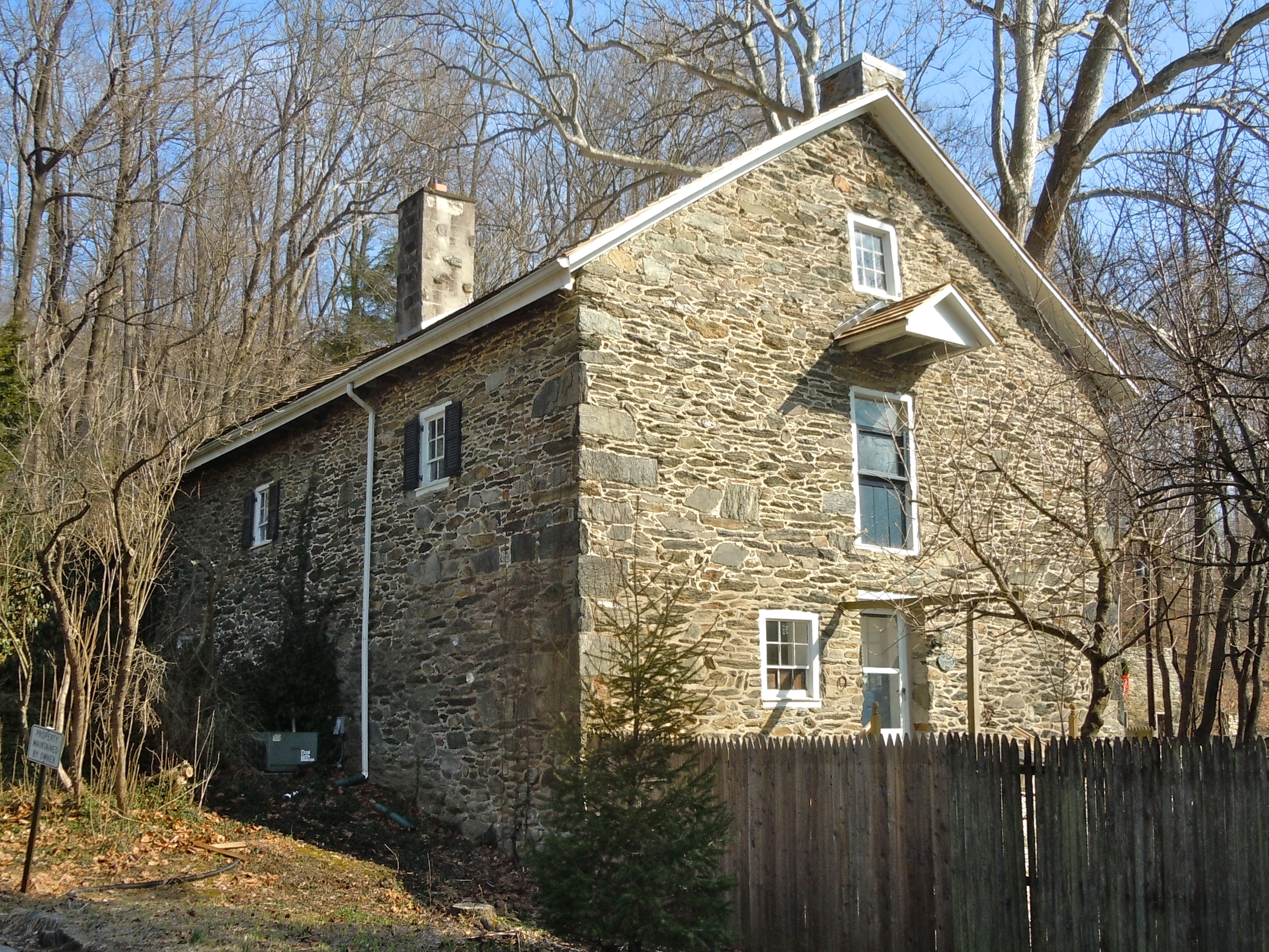
- House in the Paradise Valley Historic District, March 2011

- Location within Pennsylvania Location within the United States
- Location: Roughly Valley Creek Road from U.S. Route 322 to Ravine Road, near Marshallton, East Bradford Township, Pennsylvania
- Coordinates: 39°59′04″N 75°39′55″W
- Area: 260 acres (110 ha)
- Architectural style: Georgian, Federal, Vernacular Pennsylvania Colonial
- NRHP reference No.: 92001724
- Added to NRHP: December 24, 1992

The Paradise Valley Historic District is a national historic district that is located in East Bradford Township, Chester County, Pennsylvania.

It was added to the National Register of Historic Places in 1992.

== History and architectural features ==
This district encompasses twenty-five contributing buildings, ten contributing sites, and ten contributing structures that are located in rural Chester County. It includes a variety of vernacular stone farmhouses, bank barns, farm outbuildings, a stone bridge, two mill races, and a small family graveyard. Notable properties include the William Mercer Farm, Samuel Starr Farm, George Jefferis Farm, Thomas Price Farm, Spackman's Mill site, Hannum Mill site, and Enoch Pearson Farm.
