= Cope's Bridge =

- U.S. National Register of Historic Places
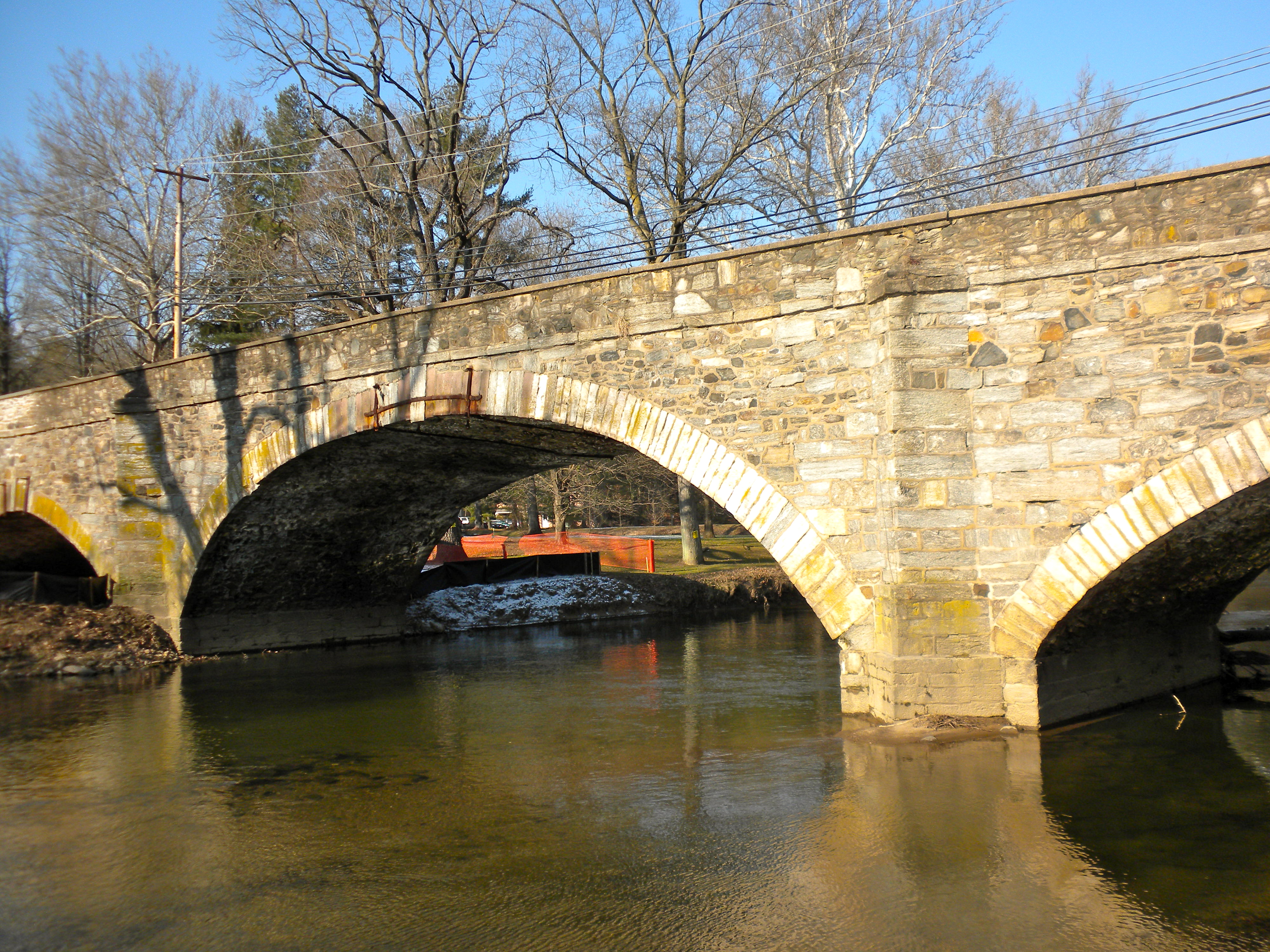

- Location within Pennsylvania Location within the United States
- Location: East Bradford Township, Pennsylvania
- Coordinates: 39°57′31.9″N 75°39′19.3″W
- Area: 1 acre (0.40 ha)
- Built: 1807
- Architectural style: Stone arch bridge
- NRHP reference No.: 85000465
- Added to NRHP: March 7, 1985

Cope's Bridge is a stone arch bridge that carries Strasburg Road (Pennsylvania Route 162) across the East Branch Brandywine Creek in East Bradford Township, Pennsylvania. The bridge is listed on the National Register of Historic Places and is located within the Taylor–Cope Historic District.

Before the construction of a bridge at this location, the site was known as Taylor's Ford. The original bridge at the site was probably timber, built about 1770, and funded by subscription. This was replaced by another wooden bridge in 1789. A petition to the Court of Chester County in 1804 complained of the decay of the bridge, and asked the county to erect a stone bridge instead. The bridge was built in 1807 and cost $26,911.03. It continues to carry traffic today.

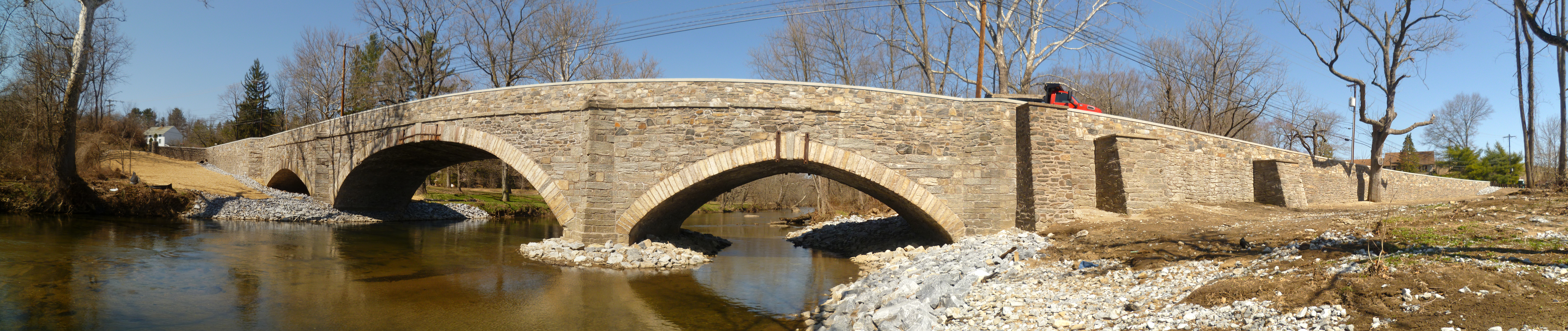
After renovation in 2011
