= Taylor House (Marshallton, Pennsylvania) =

Historic house in Pennsylvania, United States

- U.S. National Register of Historic Places
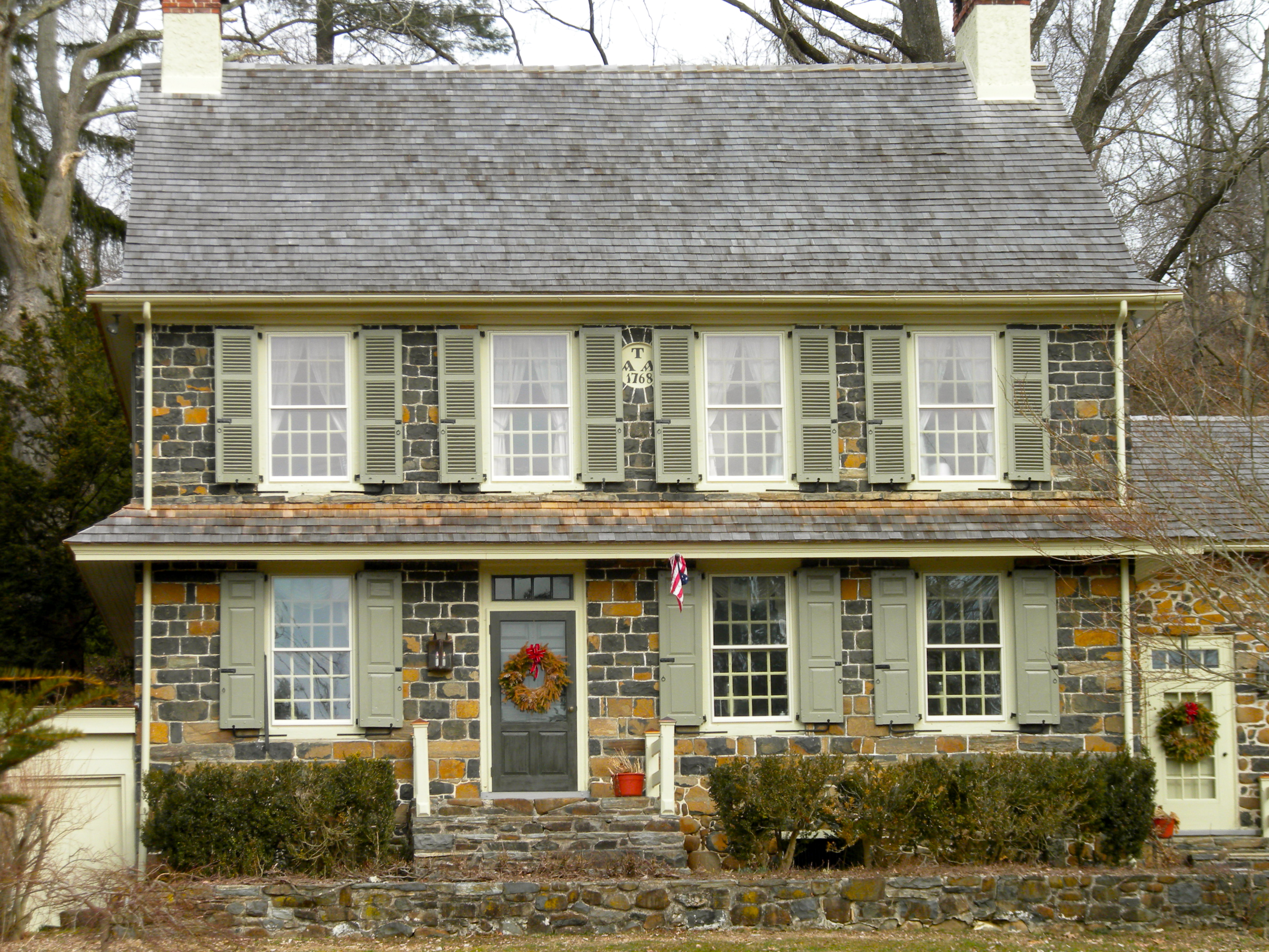
- Front of the Taylor–Parke House, displaying a date stone in the middle of the second story.

- Location within Pennsylvania Location within the United States
- Location: East of Marshallton on West Strasburg Road, East Bradford Township, Pennsylvania
- Coordinates: 39°57′27″N 75°39′40″W
- Area: 5.1 acres (2.1 ha)
- Built: 1768
- Architectural style: Georgian
- NRHP reference No.: 79002202
- Added to NRHP: August 1, 1979

Taylor House, also known as the Meadowview Farm and Taylor–Parke House, is an historic home that is located in East Bradford Township, Chester County, Pennsylvania, United States.

Added to the National Register of Historic Places in 1979, it is a contributing building to the Taylor–Cope Historic District.

== History and architectural features ==
Built in 1768, this historic structure has three sections. The main section is 2 1/2 stories and constructed of fieldstone. Four bays wide and has a gable roof, it has a 1 1/2-story stone kitchen wing and an attached stone shed.
