= Strode's Mill Historic District =

Historic district in Pennsylvania, United States

- U.S. National Register of Historic Places
- U.S. Historic district
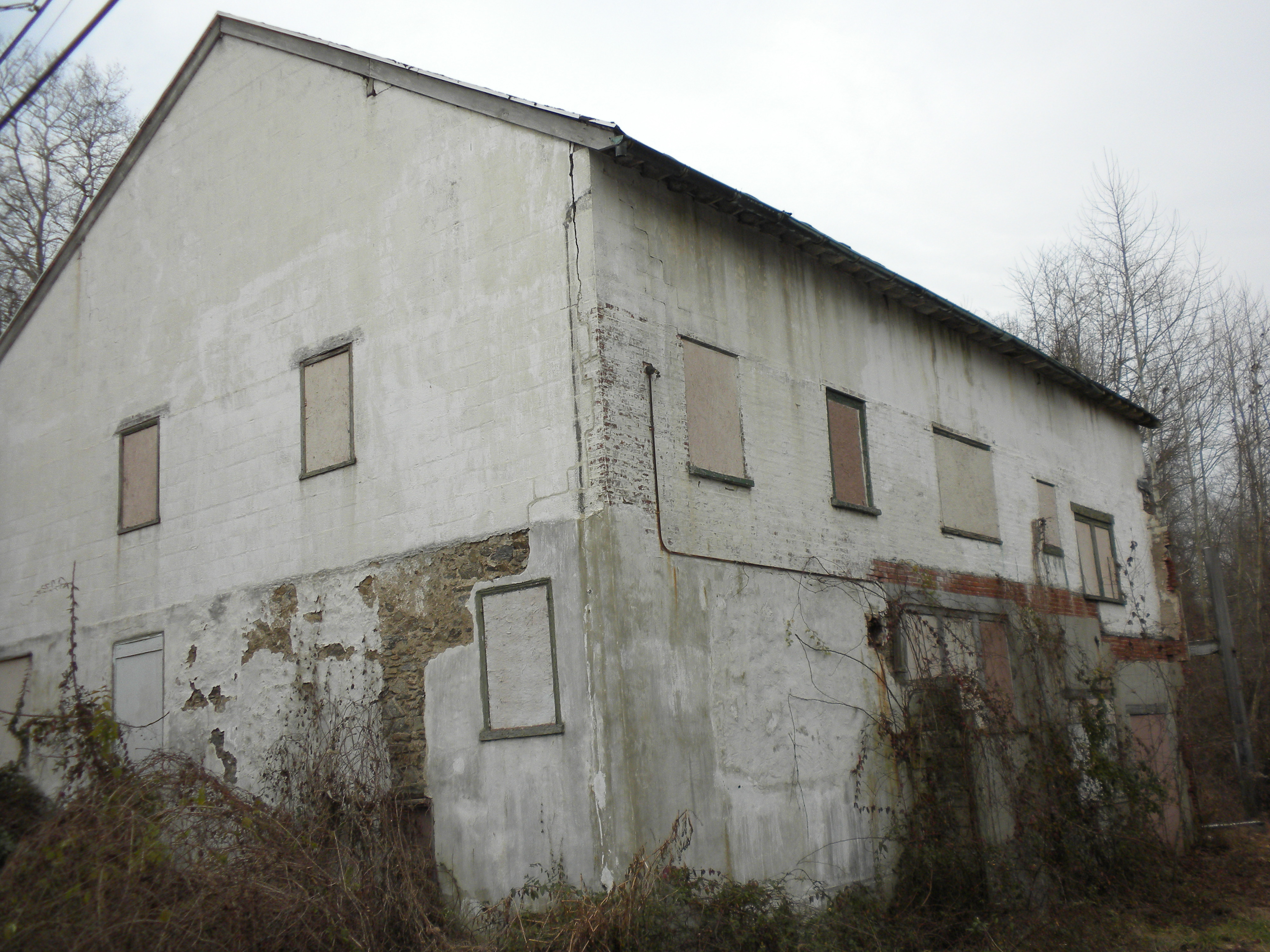
- Building in the Strode's Mill Historic District, December 2009

- Location within Pennsylvania Location within the United States
- Location: Junction of Pennsylvania Route 52 and Birmingham Road, East Bradford Township, Pennsylvania
- Coordinates: 39°55′42″N 75°37′03″W
- Area: 12 acres (4.9 ha)
- Architectural style: Federal, Vernacular Georgian
- NRHP reference No.: 89000354
- Added to NRHP: May 5, 1989

The Strode's Mill Historic District is a national historic district that is located in East Bradford Township, Chester County, Pennsylvania.

It was added to the National Register of Historic Places in 1989.

== History and architectural features ==
This district encompasses eleven contributing buildings that are located in the crossroads community of Strode's Mill. The construction of these buildings dates to roughly between 1721 and 1880.

This district also includes the separately listed Strode's Mill and East Bradford Boarding School for Boys, Strode Farm, a miller's house, Strode's Pork Products plant, a blacksmith/tenant house, a blacksmith/wheelwright shop, and a tenant house.
