= Carter–Worth House and Farm =

Historic house in Pennsylvania, United States

- Carter-Worth House and Farm
- U.S. National Register of Historic Places
- U.S. Historic district – Contributing property
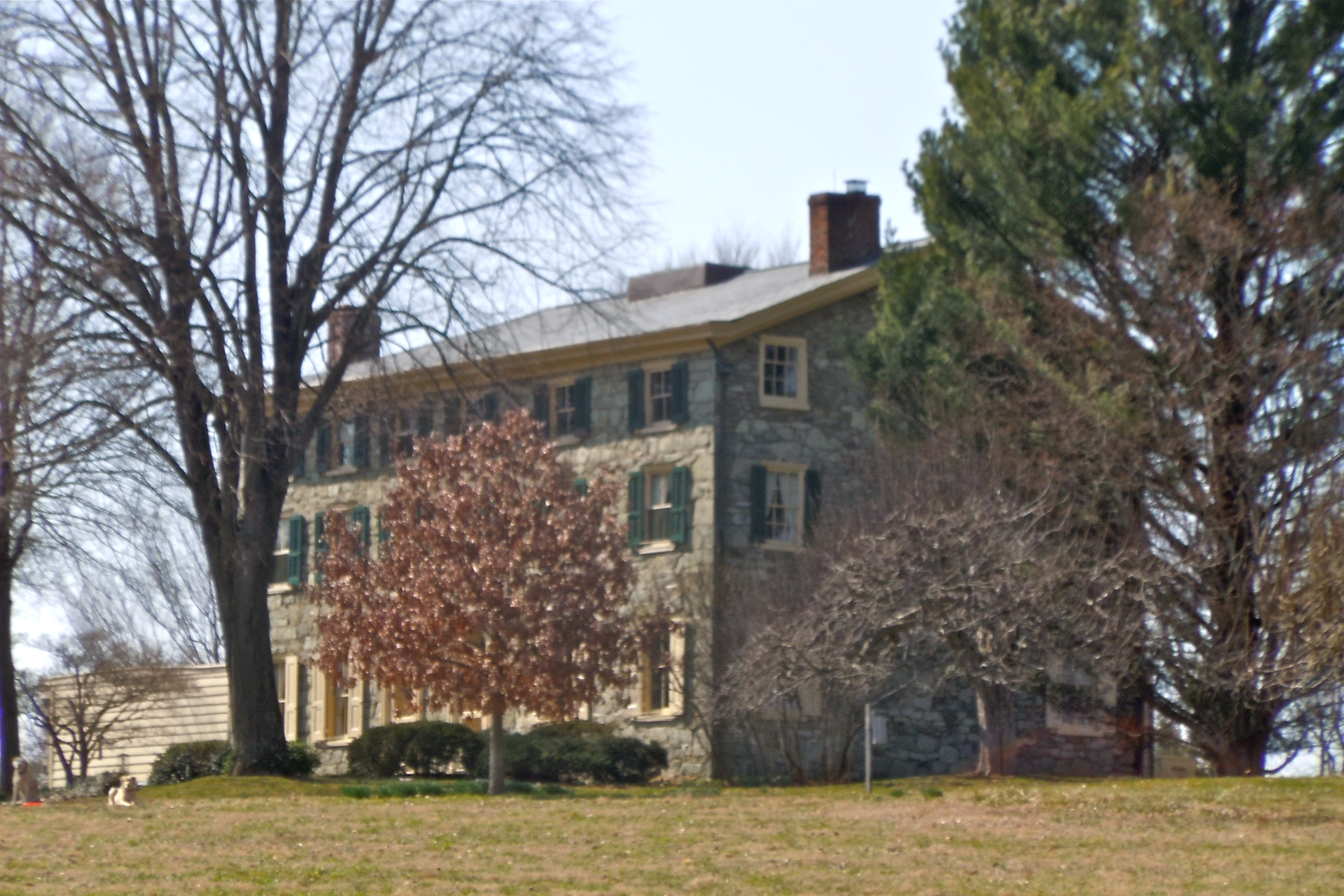
- Carter–Worth House, March 2011

- Location within Pennsylvania Location within the United States
- Location: 450 Lucky Hill Road near Marshallton, East Bradford Township, Pennsylvania
- Coordinates: 39°56′43″N 75°40′2″W
- Area: 3.5 acres (1.4 ha)
- Built: c. 1815
- NRHP reference No.: 77001151
- Added to NRHP: September 15, 1977

Carter–Worth House and Farm, also known as Armstrong Farm, Upper Plantation, Francis Worth Farm, and Tall Pine Farm, is a historic home and farm located in East Bradford Township, Chester County, Pennsylvania. The original section of the house was built about 1815. It was a two-story, three-bay, serpentine structure with a gable roof. It was later expanded to three stories and doubled in size sometime before the Civil War.

It was added to the National Register of Historic Places in 1977. It is located in the Worth-Jefferis Rural Historic District.
