= Stoneleigh: A Natural Garden =

Natural garden

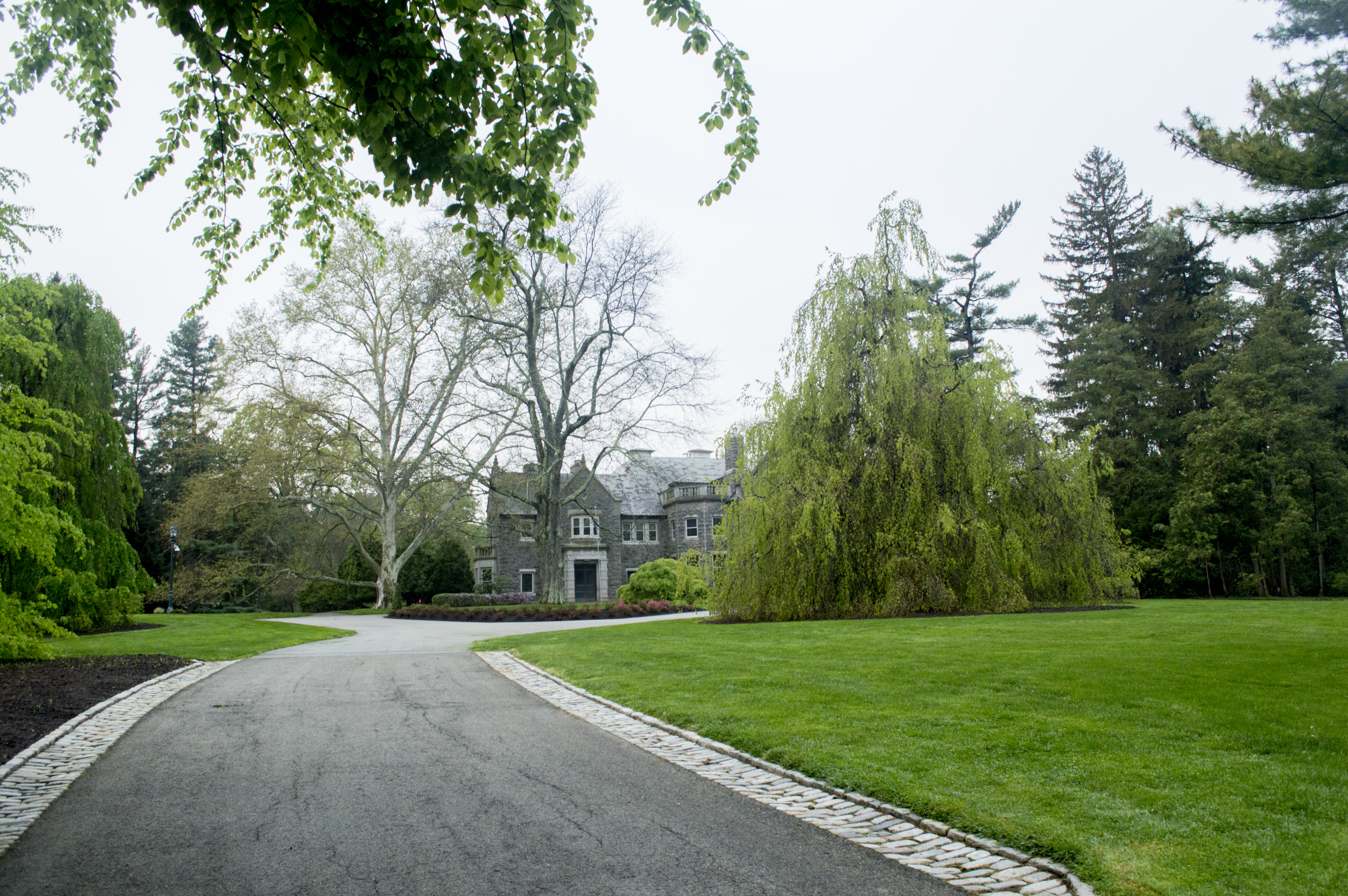
The Tudor Revival mansion at Stoneleigh.

Stoneleigh: a natural garden is a 52-acre property in Villanova, Pennsylvania, owned by Natural Lands, a land conservation non-profit organization founded in 1953 and headquartered in Media, Pennsylvania.

On April 20, 2016, the children of the late John and Chara Haas donated the family’s 42-acre Stoneleigh estate to Natural Lands. “This remarkable act of generosity marks a turning point for both Stoneleigh and for our organization,” said Molly Morrison, then president of Natural Lands. “We are deeply honored to be entrusted to carry on the Haas family’s legacy of stewardship for this magical place, and excited beyond measure to add Stoneleigh as a unique, shining star in our constellation of preserves."

== History ==
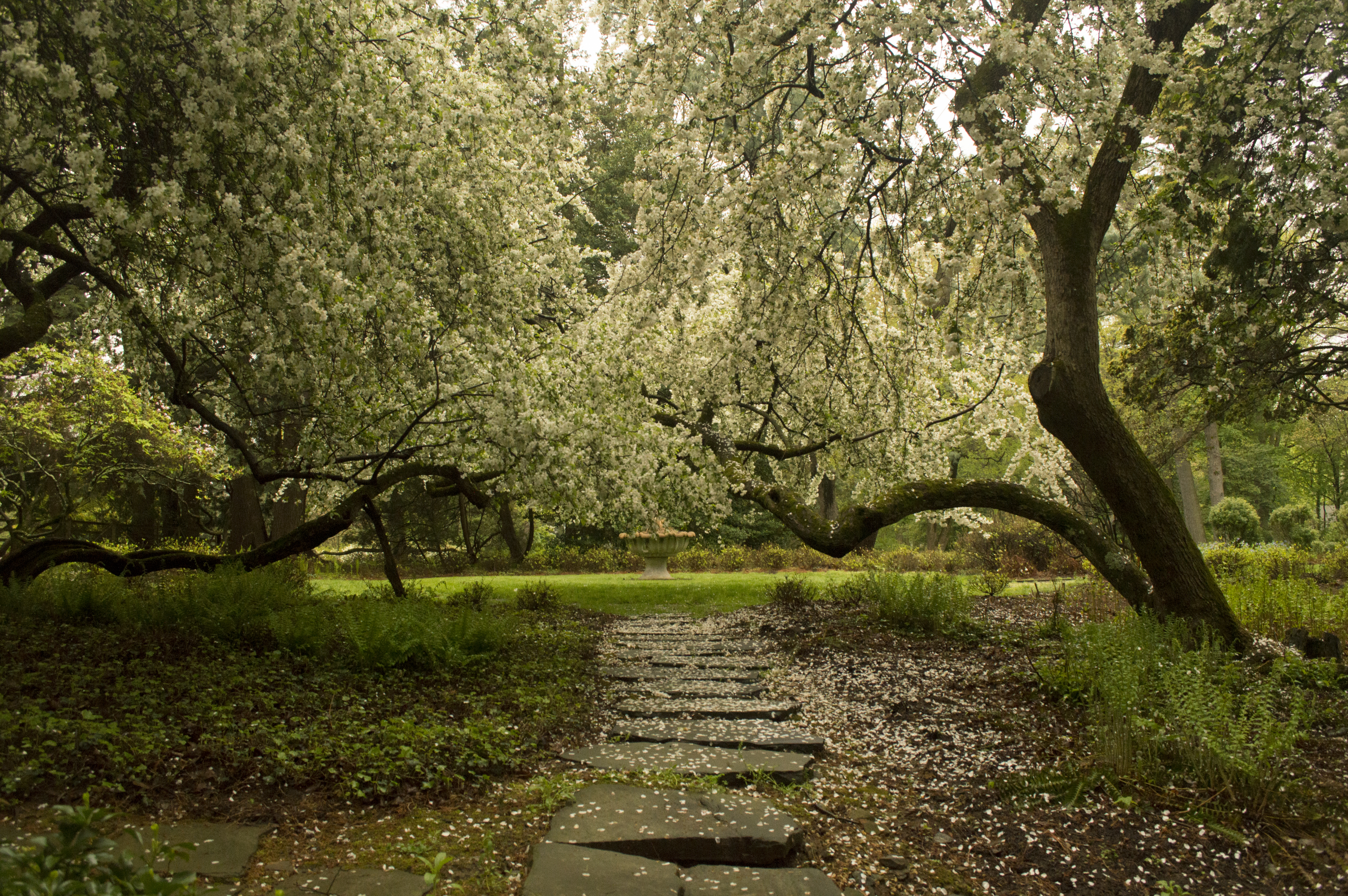
The gardens at Stoneleigh.

Stoneleigh’s history dates back to 1877 when Edmund Smith, a rising executive with the Pennsylvania Railroad Company, purchased 65 acres of land in Villanova and constructed a residence there. In 1900, Samuel Bodine, head of United Gas Improvement Company, acquired the property.

Following Samuel Bodine’s death in 1932, Stoneleigh was subdivided and sold. Otto Haas, entrepreneur and co-founder of Rohm and Haas Company, purchased the southwestern portion of the estate, launching a more than 80-year tenure of careful stewardship by the Haas family.

Otto and Phoebe’s son, John, and his wife, Chara, acquired Stoneleigh in 1964 and lived there for the next five decades.

The property includes trees, pathways, and gardens that the Haas family has carefully stewarded over the decades. The gardens were designed by a number of notable landscape architects over the past century—including Olmsted Brothers, sons of the famed Frederick Law Olmsted.

The Tudor Revival mansion serves both as home to the Organ Historical Society, an international non-profit organization dedicated to celebrating, studying, and preserving pipe organ history, and a space for a wide variety of programs.

Stoneleigh opened to guests in May 2018. Stoneleigh is a unique public garden blending history, horticulture, ecological and conservation values, and Natural Lands’ emphasis on access to nature for all. There is no admission fee to visit Stoneleigh.

The property joins the dozens of public gardens in the Greater Philadelphia area, which is considered "America's Garden Capital" with more than 30 gardens within 30 miles of Center City Philadelphia.

== Controversy ==
Just days before Stoneleigh's grand opening in May, 2018, Natural Lands faced a fight to save the property. The Lower Merion School District announced its intention to seize the historic gardens and buildings by eminent domain to construct a new middle school and sports complex in their place. In response, Natural Lands launched its campaign to Save Stoneleigh, which garnered immediate and overwhelming support from the greater community.

One month later, supporters in the Pennsylvania legislature joined the fight and introduced House Bill 2468. The Bill passed within days and with remarkable bipartisan support. The new law—Act 45—requires Orphans' Court approval before any entity can seize a property preserved by a conservation easement.

In 2018, LMSD purchased through eminent domain two parcels—collectively known as Oakwell—as a site for athletic fields for Black Rock Middle School. As development plans progressed, public concern grew. Over a period of years, community members campaigned for preservation of the property and its towering trees, historical structures, and horticultural legacy.

A turning point came early in 2024, when ongoing conversations between Lower Merion School District and Natural Lands led to a conservation solution. In August of that year, the two organizations announced an agreement: Lower Merion School District would sell 10 acres of Oakwell to Natural Lands to expand Stoneleigh and the remaining three acres the Wyncote Foundation, which will restore and preserve the Oakwell mansion.

In June, 2026, the property transfers were completed and Stoneleigh: a natural garden grew to 52 acres as it reunited with the adjacent property, which was subdivided from the Stoneleigh estate in the 1920s and 30s.
