= Stroud Preserve =

Nature reserve in Chester County, Pennsylvania

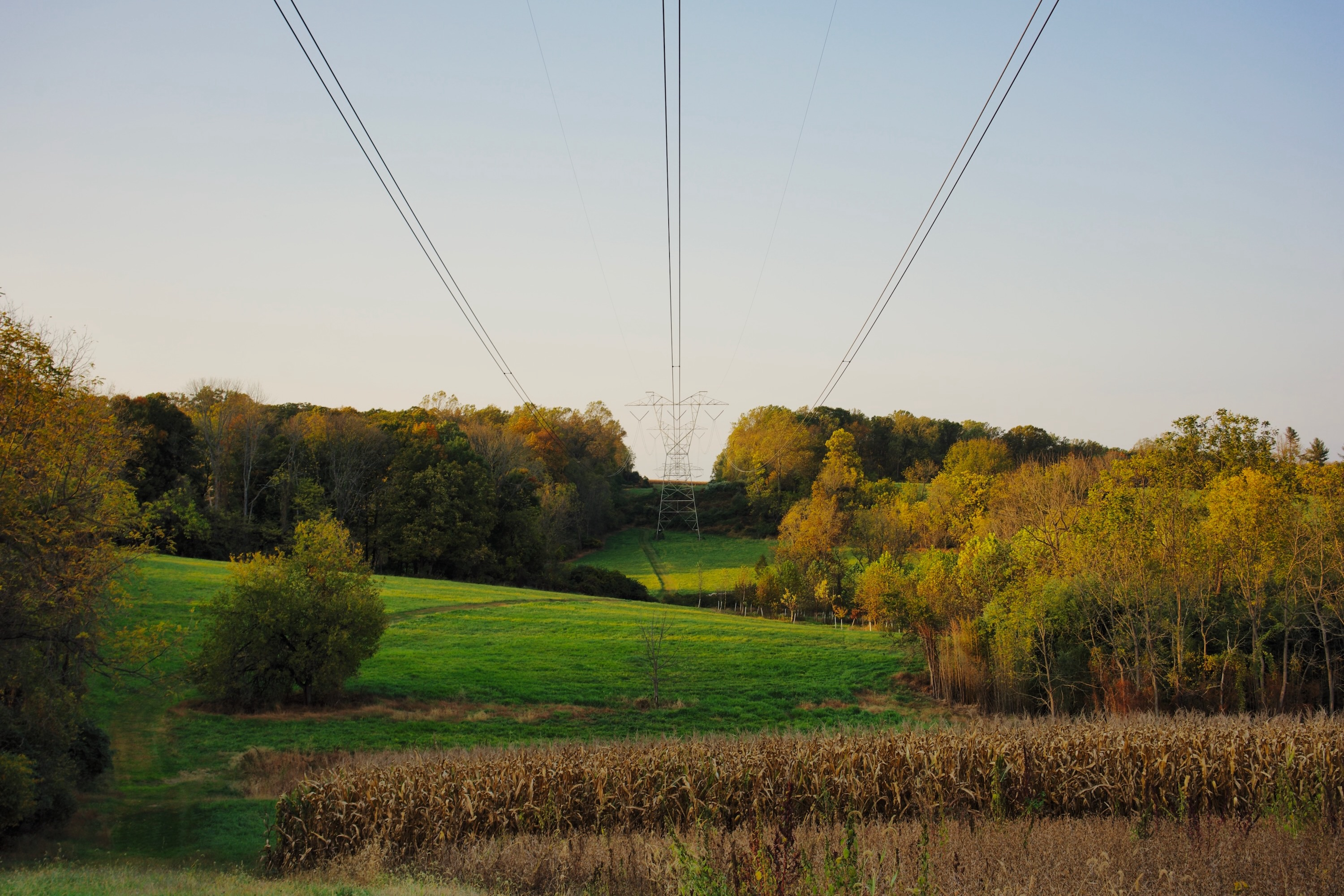
- Stroud Preserve in October 2024
- Interactive map of Stroud Preserve
- Location: 454 North Creek Road, West Chester, Pennsylvania, United States
- Coordinates: 39.953051°N 75.647767°W
- Area: 571 acres (231 ha)
- Established: 1990
- Governing body: Natural Lands

Stroud Preserve is a nature reserve located in Chester County, Pennsylvania. Owned and managed by Natural Lands, the preserve contains meadows, working farmlands, and woodlands along the East Branch Brandywine Creek. It makes up a large portion of the Worth–Jefferis Rural Historic District and is recognized as an Important Bird Area by the National Audubon Society.

== History ==
The land that comprises Stroud Preserve was once part of Laird farm, a large tract that was used to raise beef cattle; later on, the Stroud family used it to train Labrador Retrievers. The preserve's core property, Georgia Farm, was built in 1740 by Thomas Worth. Worth inherited the land from his father, who had purchased it in 1682 from William Penn, founder of the Pennsylvania Colony.

In 1990, Morris W. Stroud donated the 332-acre farm to Natural Lands (then known as Natural Lands Trust), establishing Stroud Preserve. Stroud also donated conservation easements to the Brandywine Conservancy and gave the Stroud Water Research Center access to the property to carry out scientific research and environmental education programs.

Since its founding, the preserve has increased in size through donations, grants, and purchases of adjacent properties, reaching its current extent of 571 acres.

== Features ==
=== Recreation ===
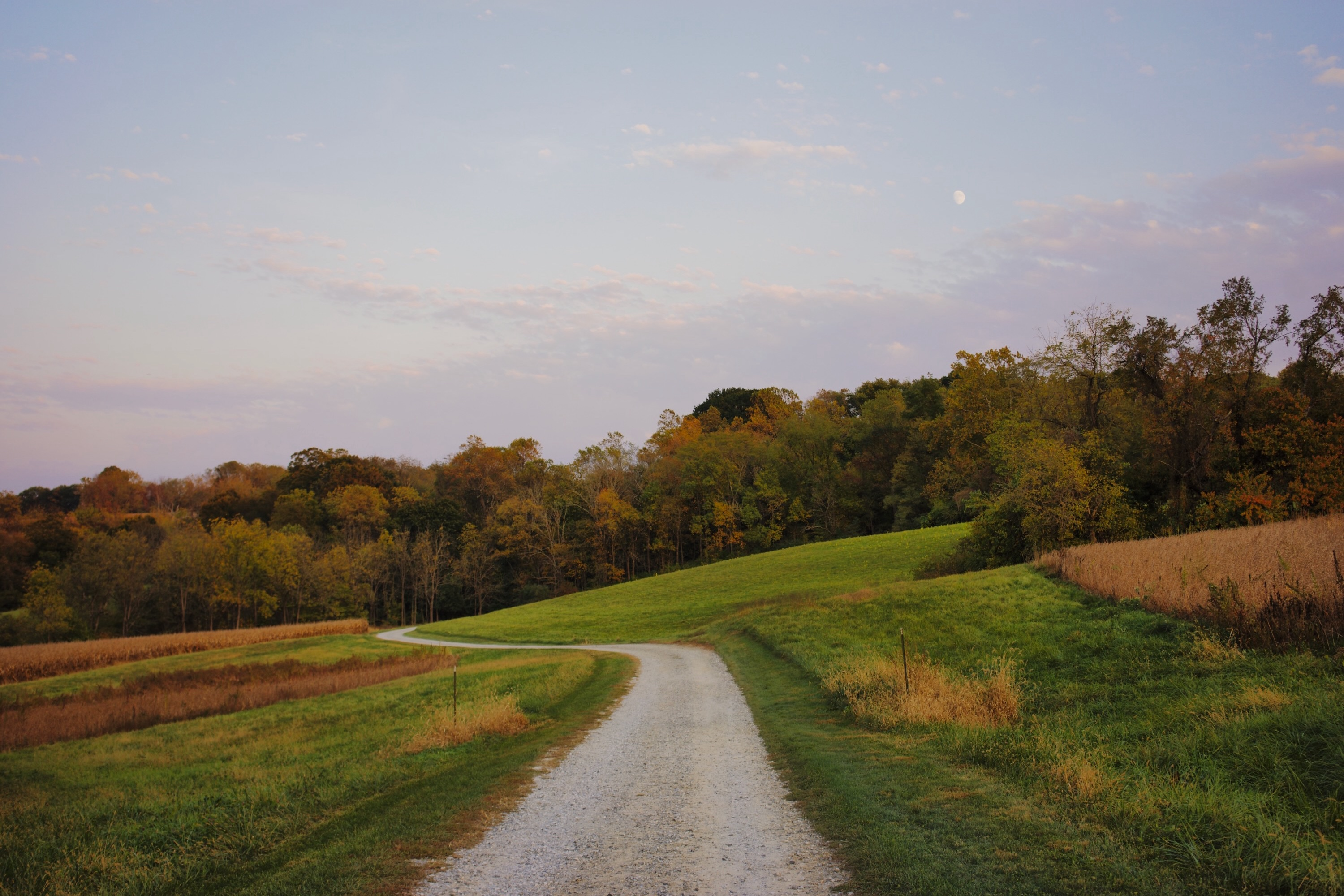
The Yellow Loop at twilight, facing east

Stroud Preserve is free and open to the public year-round from dawn to dusk. The preserve has four marked hiking trails, all starting and ending at the parking lot at the entrance. The Purple Loop (0.8 miles), Green Loop (2.1 miles), and Yellow Loop (2.8 miles) are categorized as easy trails, while the Red Loop (3.7 miles) is classified as moderate. Most trails are also open to equestrians, cyclists, and leashed dogs.

=== Natural features ===
Stroud Preserve has a variety of wetlands, forests, and grasslands along the East Branch Brandywine Creek. Its woodlands are a habitat for red-tailed hawks and great horned owls, and its grasslands contain species including bobolinks, red-winged blackbirds, eastern meadowlarks, and grasshopper sparrows. Its meadows are a home for monarch butterflies, which breed in the preserve's milkweed before migrating south to Mexico for the winter.

The preserve also has working agricultural fields which grow row crops, including corn and soybeans.

A 4.5 acre farm pond was drained in 2010 and allowed to naturally revegetate with cattails and other native plants, creating a new wetland habitat. Natural Lands staff additionally removed invasive plants such as phragmites to protect the habitat of turtles, frogs, and salamanders.

=== Georgia Farm ===
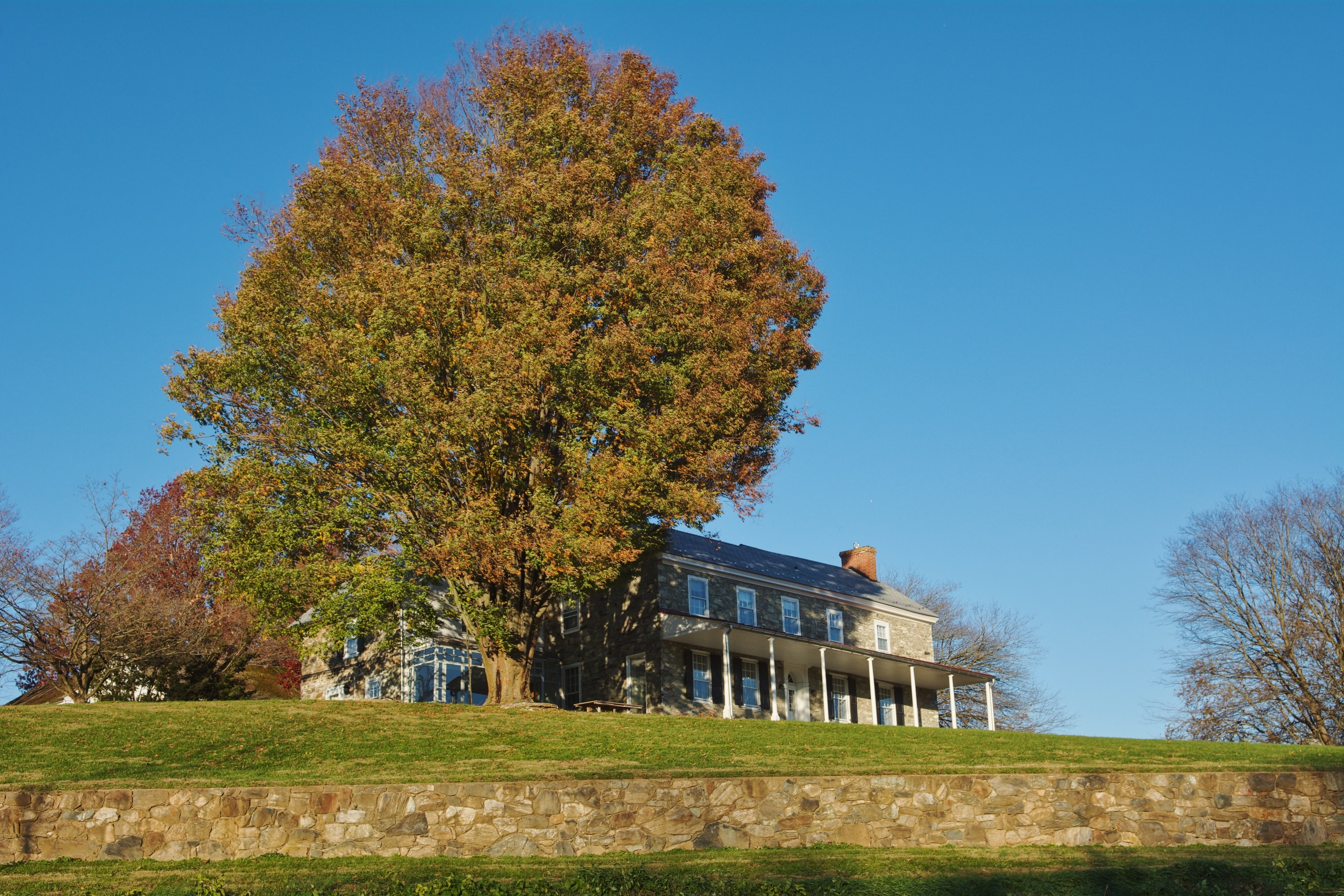
The Georgia Farm farmhouse at the center of Stroud Preserve

The farmhouse and barn of Georgia Farm are listed on the National Register of Historic Places as contributing properties in the Worth–Jefferis Rural Historic District, which was added to the Register in 1995. The farmhouse was built in 1740 out of serpentine stone from local quarries in Chester County; multiple additions in the 1800s tripled the size of the house, added an eastern wing and two-story kitchen, and added a south-facing porch. The farmhouse is a private residence and not open to the public.

In the early 1990s, television personality Mike Rowe was employed by Marion Boulton Stroud, daughter of Morris W. Stroud, to work as caretaker of Georgia Farm.
