= Hance House and Barn =

Historic house in Pennsylvania, United States

- U.S. National Register of Historic Places
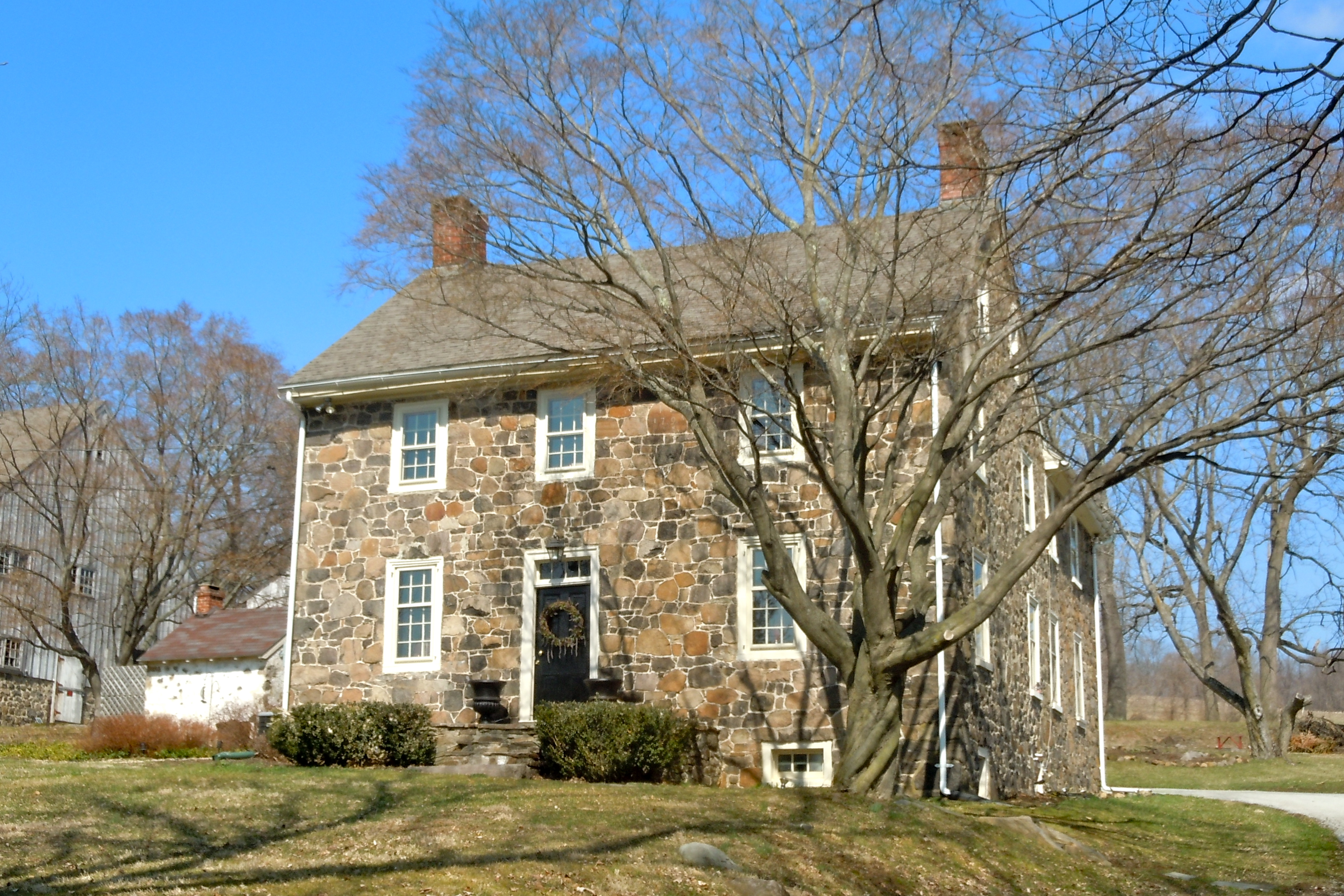
- Hance House, March 2011

- Location within Pennsylvania Location within the United States
- Location: 15 S Bridge Rd. (Rt. 842), East Bradford Township, Pennsylvania
- Coordinates: 39°55′39″N 75°39′12″W
- Area: 1 acre (0.40 ha)
- Built: 1795
- Built by: Joseph Hance
- Architectural style: English Colonial
- MPS: West Branch Brandywine Creek MRA
- NRHP reference No.: 85002354
- Added to NRHP: September 16, 1985

The Hance House and Barn is an historic home and barn complex that is located in East Bradford Township, Chester County, Pennsylvania, United States.

It was added to the National Register of Historic Places in 1985.

== History and architectural features ==
The house was built in 1795, and is a two-story, three-bay, fieldstone structure with a gable roof. It has a two-story, stone rear wing that was added circa 1850. The property also includes a contributing stone and frame bank barn, smoke house, and shed.
