= East Bradford Boarding School for Boys =

- U.S. National Register of Historic Places
- U.S. Historic district – Contributing property
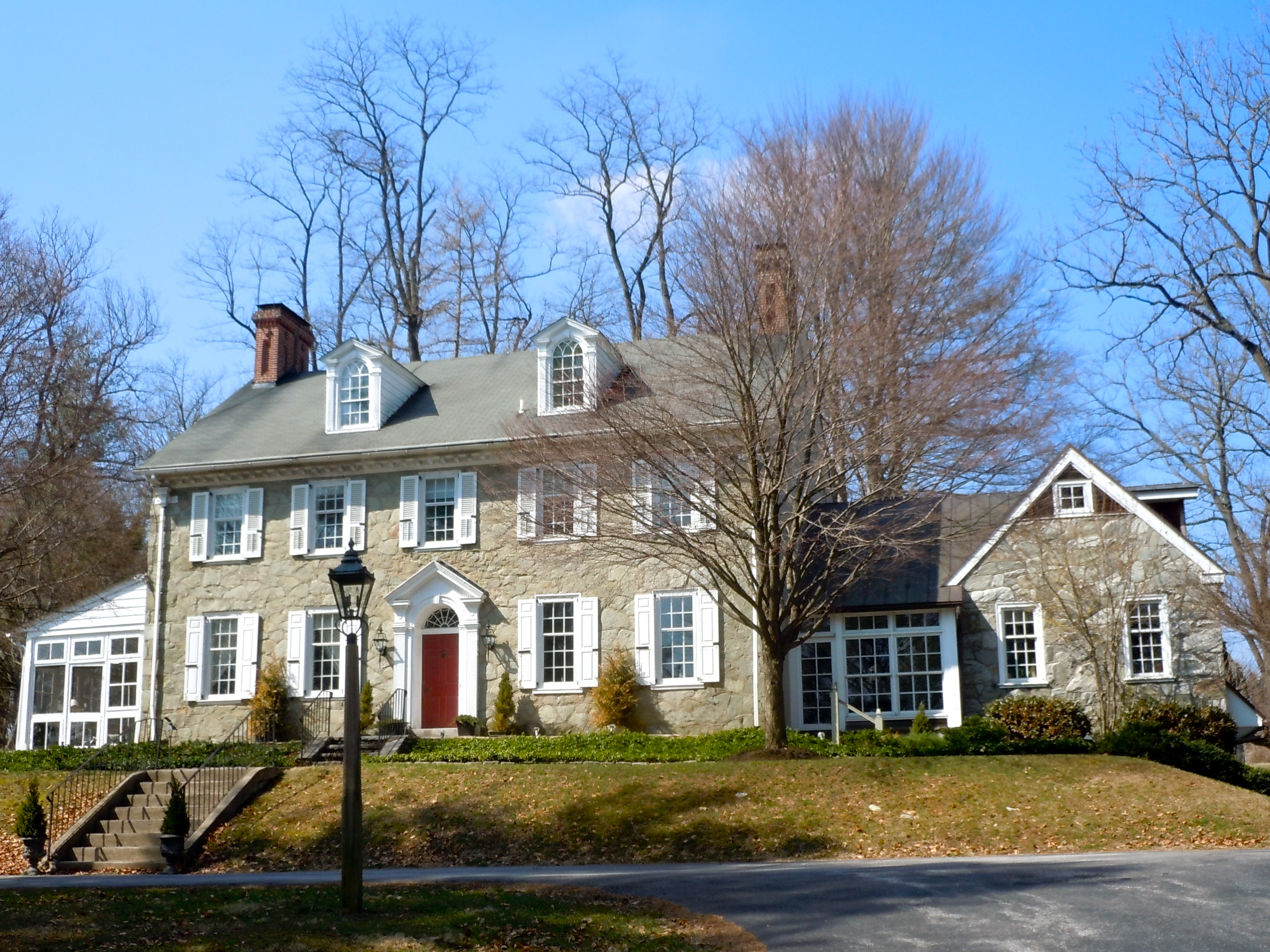
- East Bradford Boarding School for Boys, March 2011

- Location within Pennsylvania Location within the United States
- Location: 1 mile (1.6 km) east of Lenape at Birmingham and Lenape Roads, East Bradford Township, Pennsylvania
- Coordinates: 39°55′47″N 75°37′7″W
- Area: 4 acres (1.6 ha)
- Built: c. 1800
- NRHP reference No.: 73001605
- Added to NRHP: March 7, 1973

East Bradford Boarding School for Boys, also known as the Richard Strode House, is a historic boys boarding school building located in East Bradford Township, Chester County, Pennsylvania. The original section of the house was built between 1790 and 1810. It is a 2 1/2-story, five-bay, stone structure with a gable roof with dormers. The porches and kitchen wing were added in the 20th century. A school operated in the dwelling from 1816 to 1857.

It was added to the National Register of Historic Places in 1973. It is located in the Strode's Mill Historic District.
