= Taylor–Cope Historic District =

Historic district in Pennsylvania, United States

- U.S. National Register of Historic Places
- U.S. Historic district
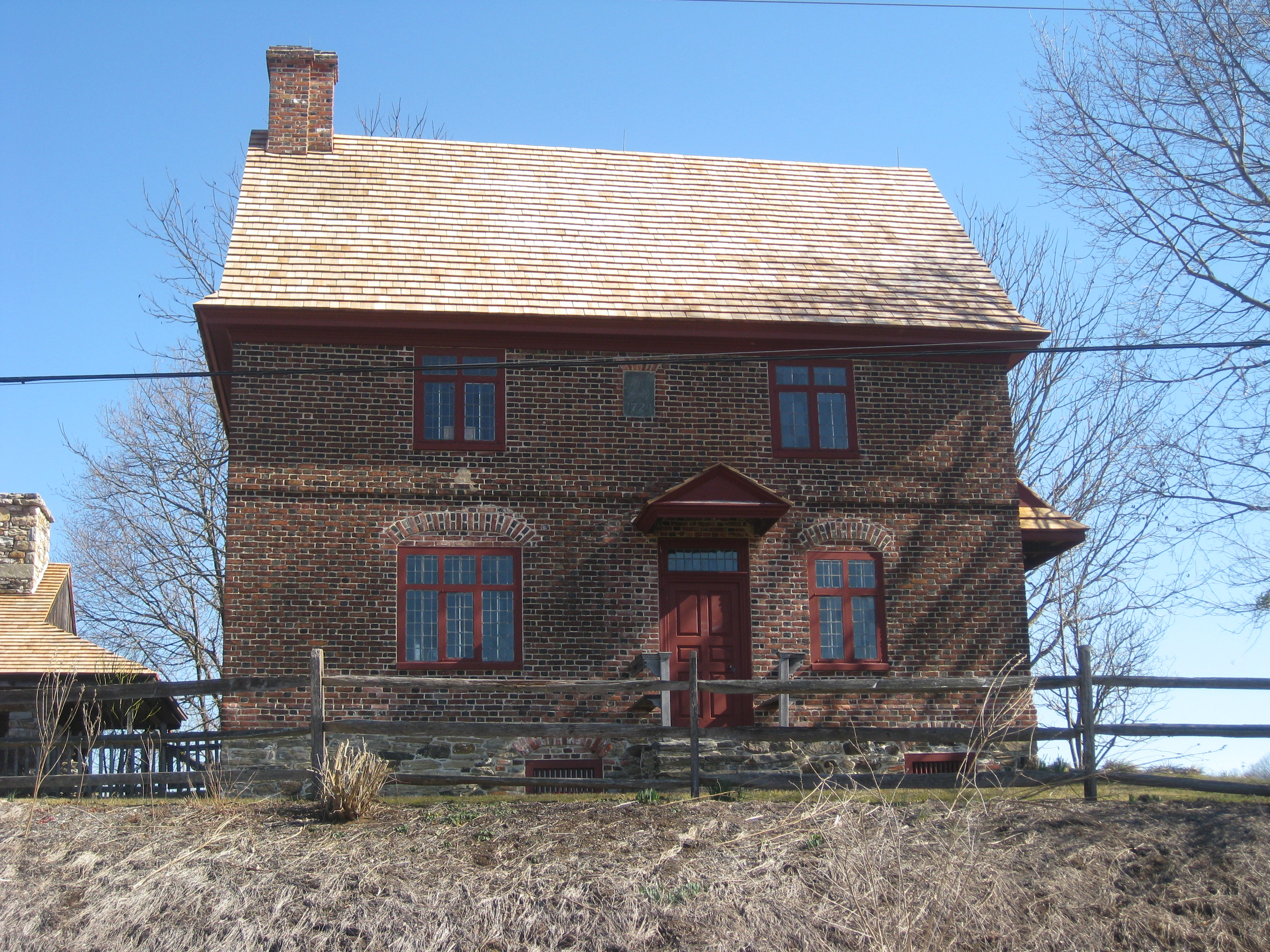
- Abiah Taylor House, Taylor–Cope Historic District, February 2012

- Location within Pennsylvania Location within the United States
- Location: 890–1100 blocks of Strasburg Road/Pennsylvania Route 162 in Marshallton, East Bradford Township, Pennsylvania
- Coordinates: 39°57′32″N 75°38′50″W
- Area: 310 acres (130 ha)
- Built: 1700
- Built by: Abiah Taylor
- Architectural style: Greek Revival, English Colonial
- NRHP reference No.: 87001250
- Added to NRHP: July 16, 1987

The Taylor–Cope Historic District is a national historic district that is located in West Bradford Township in Chester County, Pennsylvania.

It was added to the National Register of Historic Places in 1987.

== History and architectural features ==
The district encompasses fifteen contributing buildings, including the separately listed Taylor House, and one contributing structure that are all located in rural Chester County. They are primarily residential buildings and barns that were built between 1724 and 1906.

The oldest building in the district is the English Colonial style Abiah Taylor House that was erected in 1724. The contributing structure is the separately listed Cope's Bridge.
