= Natural Lands =

US non-profit land conservation organization

- Founded: 1953
- Founder: Allston Jenkins
- Type: Environmental
- Purpose: Natural Lands works to save open space, care for nature, and connect people to the outdoors.
- Location: Media, Pennsylvania
- Region served: eastern Pennsylvania, southern New Jersey
- Employees: 100
- Website: www.natlands.org

Natural Lands is a non-profit land conservation organization with headquarters in Media, Pennsylvania, dedicated to the management, protection, and conservation of eastern Pennsylvania and southern New Jersey's native forests, fields, streams, and wetlands. The organization owns and manages 43 nature preserves—and one public garden totaling more than 23,000 acres—located in 13 counties in Pennsylvania and New Jersey. Nineteen of the preserves are open to the public for recreational use; the others have limited visitation due to the presence of sensitive ecosystems or limited facilities.

== Background ==
In addition to owning and managing preserves, Natural Lands preserves land by working with private land owners to establish and enforce conservation easements. A conservation easement is a voluntary but legally binding agreement that permanently limits a property's use. To date, the organization holds easements on more than 22,000 acres.

Natural Lands also provides a range of consulting services to Pennsylvania municipalities (152 municipalities in 26 counties, to date). These services include redrafting a township's zoning ordinances to incorporate open space, thereby using development to save land.

Natural Lands has been accredited by the Land Trust Accreditation Commission, an independent program of the Land Trust Alliance, which endorses a land trust's ability to "operate in an ethical, legal, and technically sound manner and ensure the long-term protection of land in the public interest."

To date, Natural Lands has saved more than 135,000 acres of land in its nearly 64-year history. This is equal to about half the total acreage of Pennsylvania's state park system.

== Mission ==
Natural Lands is a nonprofit organization that saves open space, cares for nature, and connects people to the outdoors in eastern Pennsylvania and southern New Jersey. More than 2.5 million people live within five miles of lands under the organization's permanent protection. The organization's approach to conservation includes:

- Saving open space - Permanently protecting natural areas using acquisition and conservation easements and by helping growing communities preserve more of their land
- Caring for nature - Providing leadership in managing natural resources on its preserves and sharing its expertise with other landowners
- Connecting People to the Outdoors - Creating opportunities for people to connect with and learn from nature

== History ==
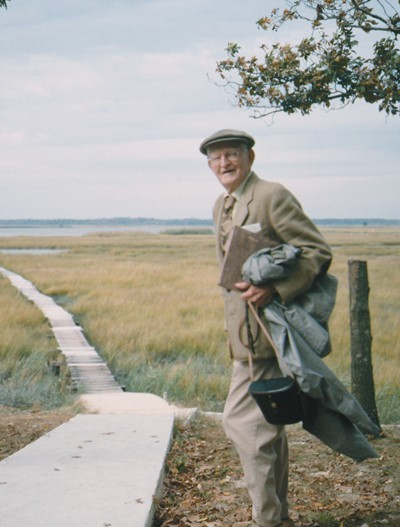
Natural Lands' founder Allston Jenkins

Natural Lands was founded in 1953 as the Philadelphia Conservationists, Inc., by a group of birdwatchers who wanted to protect what is now the John Heinz National Wildlife Refuge, a tidal freshwater marsh in Tinicum Township, Pennsylvania. Led by Allston Jenkins, a local accountant who was new to birding when he founded the organization, The Philadelphia Conservationists achieved their goal of protecting the Tinicum Marsh from being filled with sediment dredged from nearby waterways by the following year. Allston Jenkins (1903-1994) became Natural Lands' first president and executive director, and was an active member within the organization until his death.

As the Philadelphia Conservationists, the organization worked to preserve land up and down the East Coast and beyond – however, they would usually turn the land that they preserved over to government agencies and other non-profits. In 1959, the organization created its first nature preserve. Sharp's Woods Preserve in Chester County, Pennsylvania, had 28 acres, and is still owned and stewarded by the organization today.

In 1961, the members of The Philadelphia Conservationists established themselves as Natural Lands Trust, Inc., as a means of being able to permanently own and preserve the land that came under their care. The same year, they received its first donation of land, now the Willisbrook Preserve in Willistown Township, Pennsylvania.

In 2017, the nonprofit shortened its name to Natural Lands.

Natural Lands has continued to acquire and steward open land in eastern Pennsylvania and in southern New Jersey in the interest of preserving open spaces and native habitats and ensuring that residents of Pennsylvania and New Jersey benefit from open spaces in perpetuity. In addition to acquiring land outright for preservation and stewardship, Natural Lands has also been responsible for conservation easements on 20,000 acres of land. The organization's first easement was the Upper Main Line YMCA in Chester County, Pennsylvania, in 1966, which was the first known conservation easement in Pennsylvania. Since its incorporation in 1961, Natural Lands has saved more than 125,000 acres of land from being developed.

Natural Lands' headquarters are located at the 55-acre Hildacy Preserve in Media, Pennsylvania since 1981.

== Programs and services ==
=== Growing Greener: Conservation by Design ===
Growing Greener: Conservation by Design is a program that Natural Lands launched in 1997 to help Pennsylvanian municipalities and independent developers conserve open space, preserve property assets, promote interconnected greenway networks, and maximize the quality of residents’ living conditions during the development process. The communities that have adopted Growing Greener Conservation by Design ordinances are currently setting aside an average of 62 percent of the land in new developments as open space.

=== Force of Nature ===
Force of Nature is Natural Lands' volunteer program, launched in 2011. Those selected for the program participate in an in-depth training program that covers a variety of land management and restoration techniques. Following training, program graduates apply their knowledge as skilled volunteers with Natural Lands.

=== Membership ===
Natural Lands relies on membership support to advance its mission of saving open space, caring for nature, and connecting people with the outdoors. Member benefits include:

- Invitations to members-only events and programming opportunities.
- Discounted tickets and priority registration to events.
- A Natural Lands member card for discounts at regional businesses.
- A subscription to Natural Lands magazine.
- 10% discount on Natural Lands merchandise.

=== Preserves and gardens ===
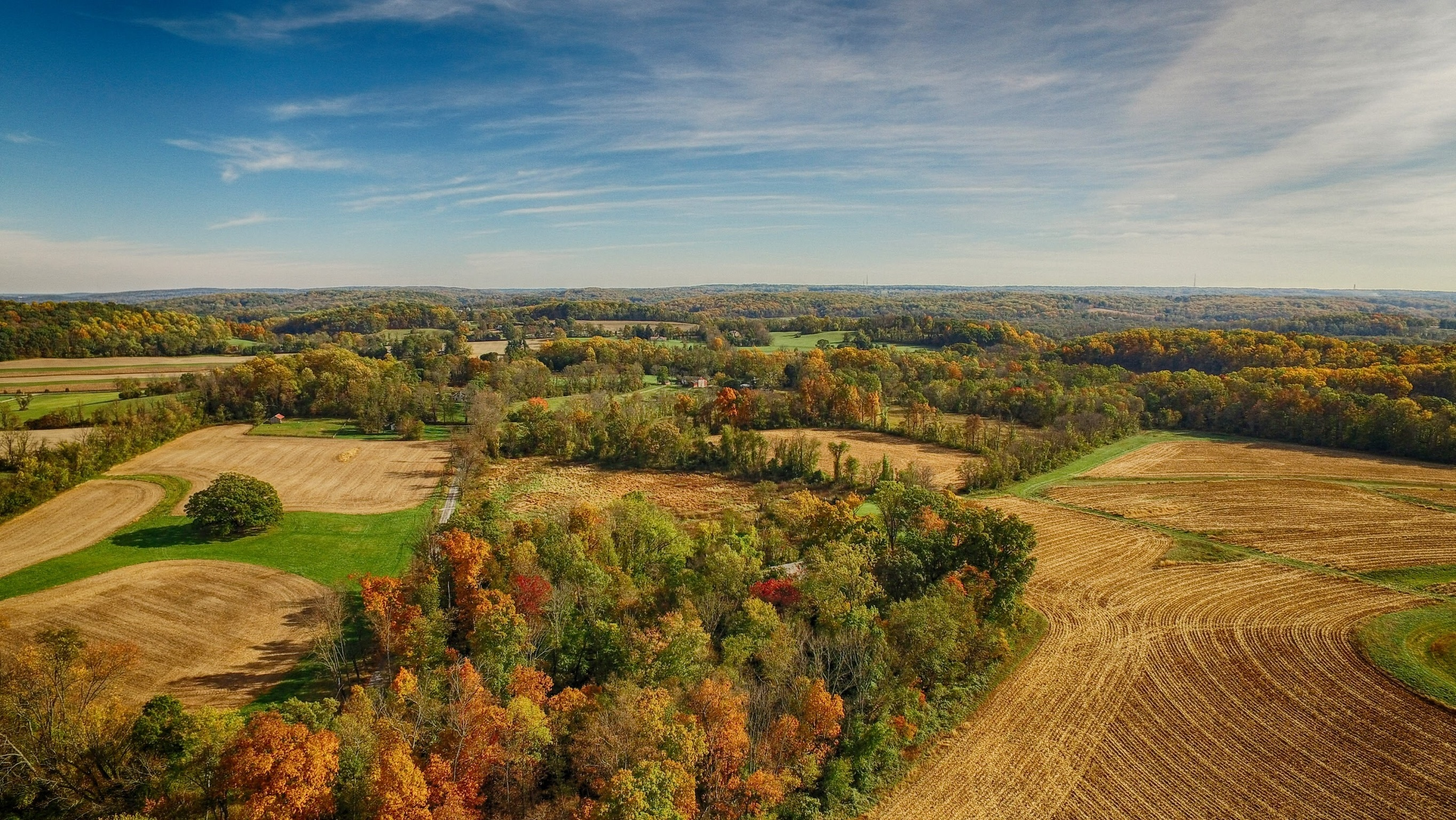
Bryn Coed Farms in 2019

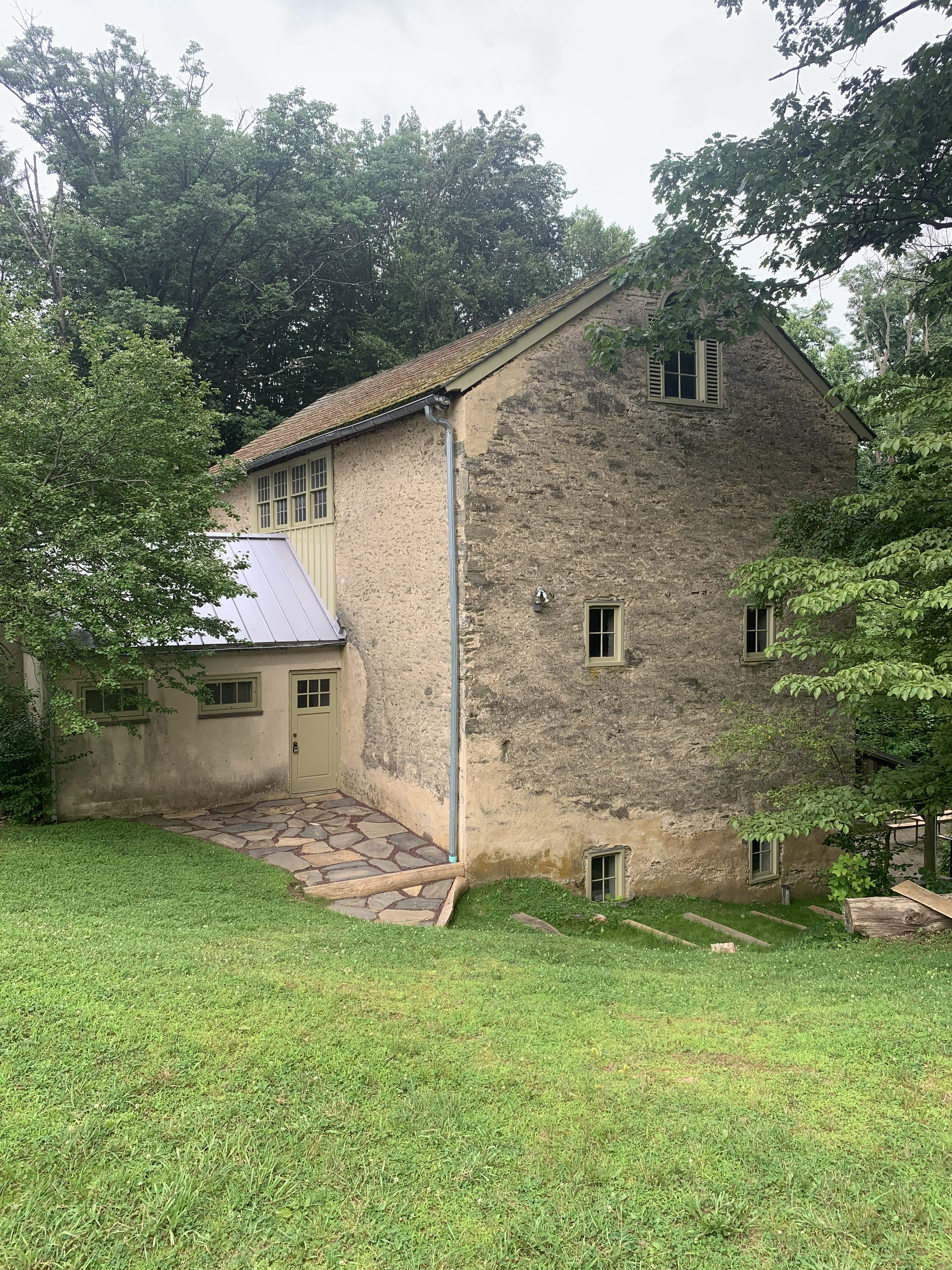
The carriage house in Saunders Woods in July 2021

Of the 44 properties Natural Lands owns and manages, 19 are open to the public daily, free of charge, from sunrise to sunset. Stoneleigh is open free of charge, Tuesday through Sunday, 10 a.m. to 5 p.m.

- Bear Creek Preserve - 3,934 acres in Bear Creek, PA
- Binky Lee Preserve - 112 acres in Chester Springs, PA
- Bryn Coed Preserve - 520 acres in Chester Springs, PA
- ChesLen Preserve - 1,282 acres in Coatesville, PA
- Crow's Nest Preserve - 712 acres in Elverson, PA
- Glades Wildlife Refuge - 7,440 acres in Fortescue, NJ
- Green Hills Preserve - 201 acres in Mohnton, PA
- Gwynedd Preserve - 279 acres in North Wales, PA
- Hildacy Preserve - 55 acres in Media, PA
- Mariton Wildlife Sanctuary - 200 acres in Easton, PA
- Meng Preserve - 101 acres in Schwenksville, PA
- Peacedale Preserve - 222 acres in Landenburg, PA
- Harold N. Peek Preserve - 344 acres in Millville, NJ
- Sadsbury Woods Preserve - 511 acres in Parkesburg, PA
- Saunders Woods Preserve - 25 acres in Gladwyne, PA
- Stone Hills Preserve - 13 acres in Schwenksville, PA
- Stoneleigh: A Natural Garden - 42 acres in Villanova, PA
- Stroud Preserve - 571 acres in West Chester, PA
- Wawa Preserve - 75 acres in Media, PA
- Willisbrook Preserve - 126 acres in Malvern, PA

== See also ==
- Beaversprite
- Hopewell Big Woods
- Musser Scout Reservation
- Perkiomen Trail
- Resica Falls Scout Reservation
