= U.S. Route 322 Business (West Chester, Pennsylvania) =

Highway in Chester County, Pennsylvania

U.S. Route 322 Business

Route information
- Auxiliary route of US 322
- Maintained by PennDOT and Borough of West Chester
- Length: 3.229 mi (5.197 km)

Major junctions
- West end: US 322 in East Bradford Township
- PA 162 in West Chester; PA 842 in West Chester; PA 3 in West Chester; PA 52 in West Chester
- East end: US 202 / US 322 in West Goshen Township

Location
- Country: United States
- State: Pennsylvania
- Counties: Chester

Highway system
- United States Numbered Highway System; List; Special; Divided; Pennsylvania State Route System; Interstate; US; State; Scenic; Legislative

U.S. Route 322 Business (US 322 Bus.) is a business route of US 322 in the borough and surrounding townships of West Chester in Chester County, Pennsylvania. US 322 bypasses West Chester to the north and east on the West Chester Bypass while US 322 Bus. heads through the downtown area. The business route begins at US 322 northwest of the borough and heads southeast, entering West Chester on Hannum Avenue. US 322 Bus. heads east into downtown West Chester along the one-way pair of West Market and West Chestnut streets. In the center of the borough, the route heads south along South High Street, passing through the West Chester University campus as it leaves the borough. US 322 Bus. comes to its eastern terminus at an interchange with US 202/US 322 at the southern terminus of the bypass.

In the 1920s, the current routing of US 322 Bus. was designated PA 5 heading northwest of West Chester and US 122/PA 29 (later US 202) along High Street. In the 1930s, US 322 was designated to run through the borough along Hannum Avenue, Gay Street, and High Street, replacing PA 5 and running concurrent with US 202. US 322 was moved to a bypass of West Chester in the 1950s, and US 322 Bus. was assigned to the former alignment of the route through the borough. US 202 was moved to the bypass by 1970, eliminating the concurrency it had with US 322 Bus. The concurrent PA 100 designation along High Street between downtown and PA 52 was removed in 2003.

== Route description ==
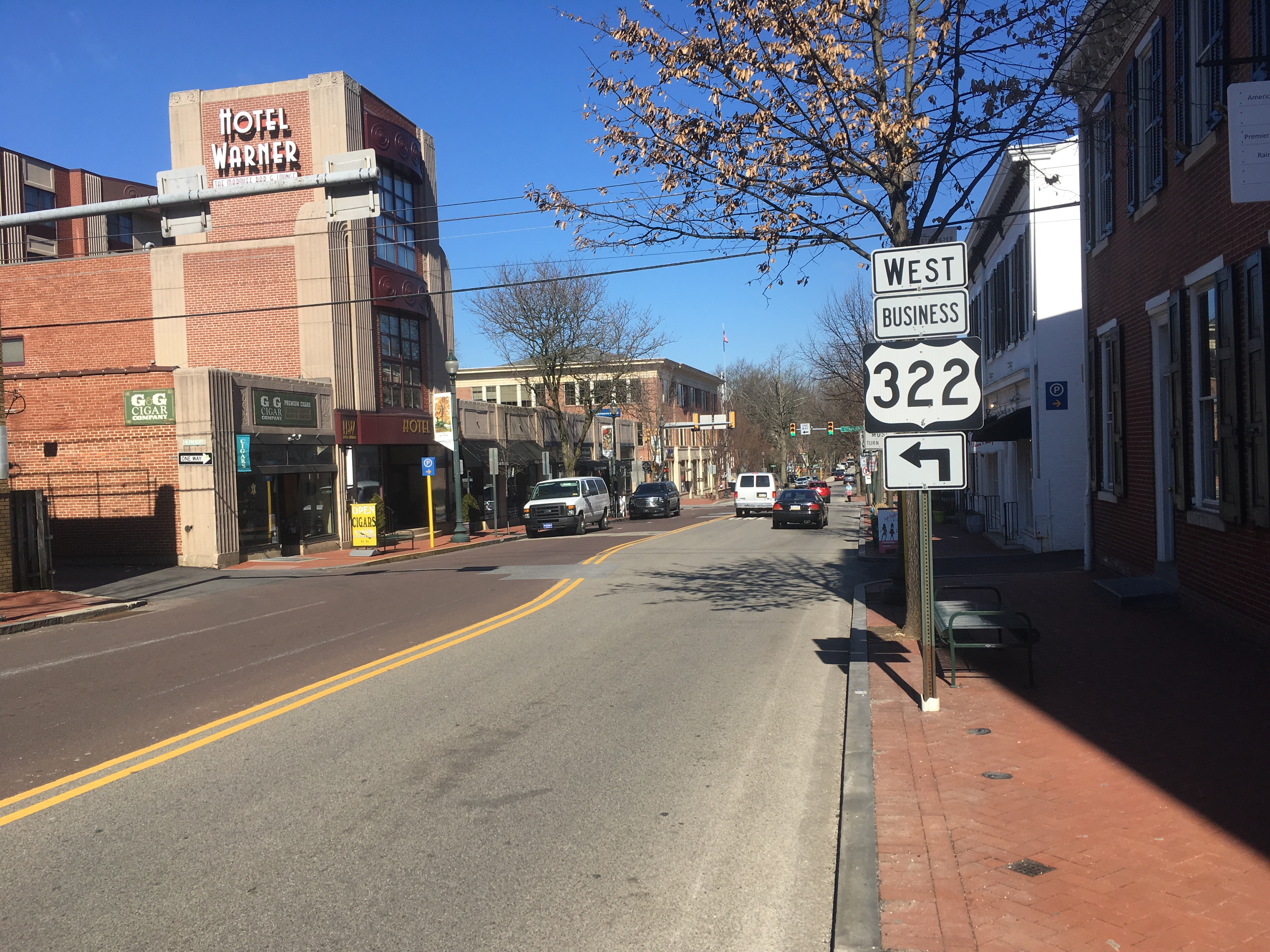
US 322 Bus. westbound approaching the terminus of PA 3 westbound in West Chester

US 322 Bus. begins at an intersection with US 322 northwest of the borough of West Chester in East Bradford Township, Chester County, heading southeast on Downingtown Pike. From this point, Downingtown Pike continues northwest as US 322 towards the borough of Downingtown. From the western terminus, the route is a three-lane undivided road with one eastbound lane and two westbound lanes. The road soon becomes a three-lane road with a center left-turn lane as it passes through a mix of woodland and businesses. US 322 Bus. crosses into the borough of West Chester and comes to an intersection with the eastern terminus of PA 162 before the name changes to Hannum Avenue. The route curves east past homes and businesses before it splits into a one-way pair. Eastbound US 322 Bus. heads southeast on North New Street and northeast on West Market Street while westbound US 322 Bus. follows West Chestnut Street. The eastbound direction has two lanes of traffic while the westbound direction has one lane of traffic. Eastbound US 322 Bus. intersects the eastern terminus of PA 842, which comes from the west along West Market Street, at the intersection of New and Market streets. US 322 Bus. follows Market and Chestnut streets northeast through the commercial downtown of West Chester. West Market Street passes between the Chester County Justice Center to the north and SEPTA's West Chester Transportation Center and a parking garage to the south between New and Darlington streets.

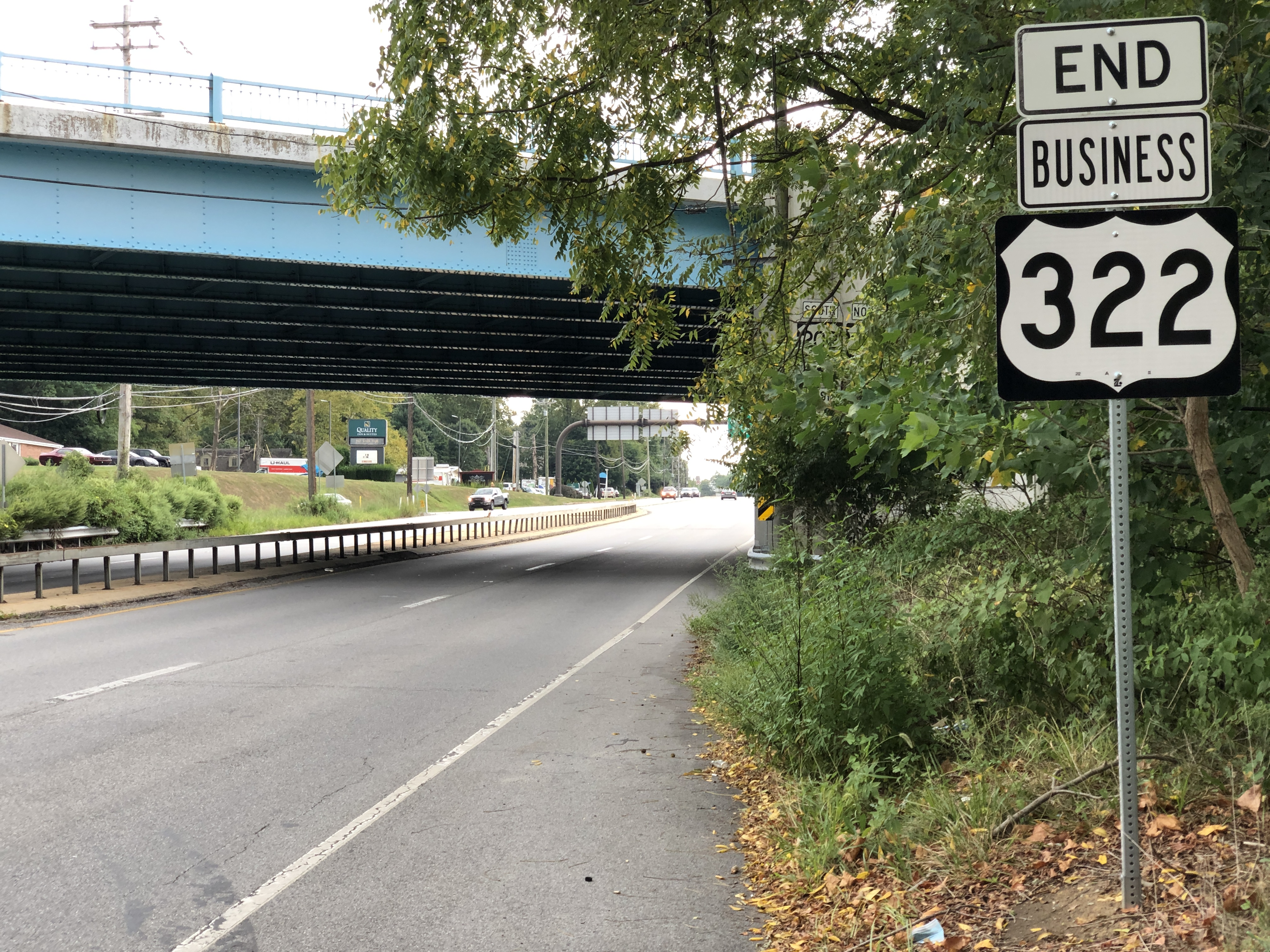
US 322 Bus. eastern terminus at US 202/US 322 in West Goshen Township

Upon reaching High Street, US 322 Bus. turns southeast onto that street, with East Market and East Chestnut streets continuing east as PA 3. At the northwest corner of High and Market streets is the historic Chester County Courthouse. US 322 Bus. follows two-lane undivided South High Street southeast through more of the downtown and intersects the beginning of westbound PA 842, which follows West Miner Street. The route leaves the downtown area and continues past a mix of homes and businesses. The road intersects the northern terminus of PA 52 at Price Street and runs southeast through the West Chester University campus. At the Rosedale Avenue intersection, US 322 Bus. leaves West Chester for West Goshen Township and becomes a three-lane road with a center left-turn lane that passes homes to the west and the university to the east. The route curves south into wooded neighborhoods and loses the center turn lane. US 322 Bus. widens to four lanes and passes businesses before it comes to its eastern terminus at an interchange with US 202/US 322 at the southern terminus of the freeway bypass of West Chester. South of here, the road continues south as US 202/US 322, called the Wilmington Pike.

== History ==
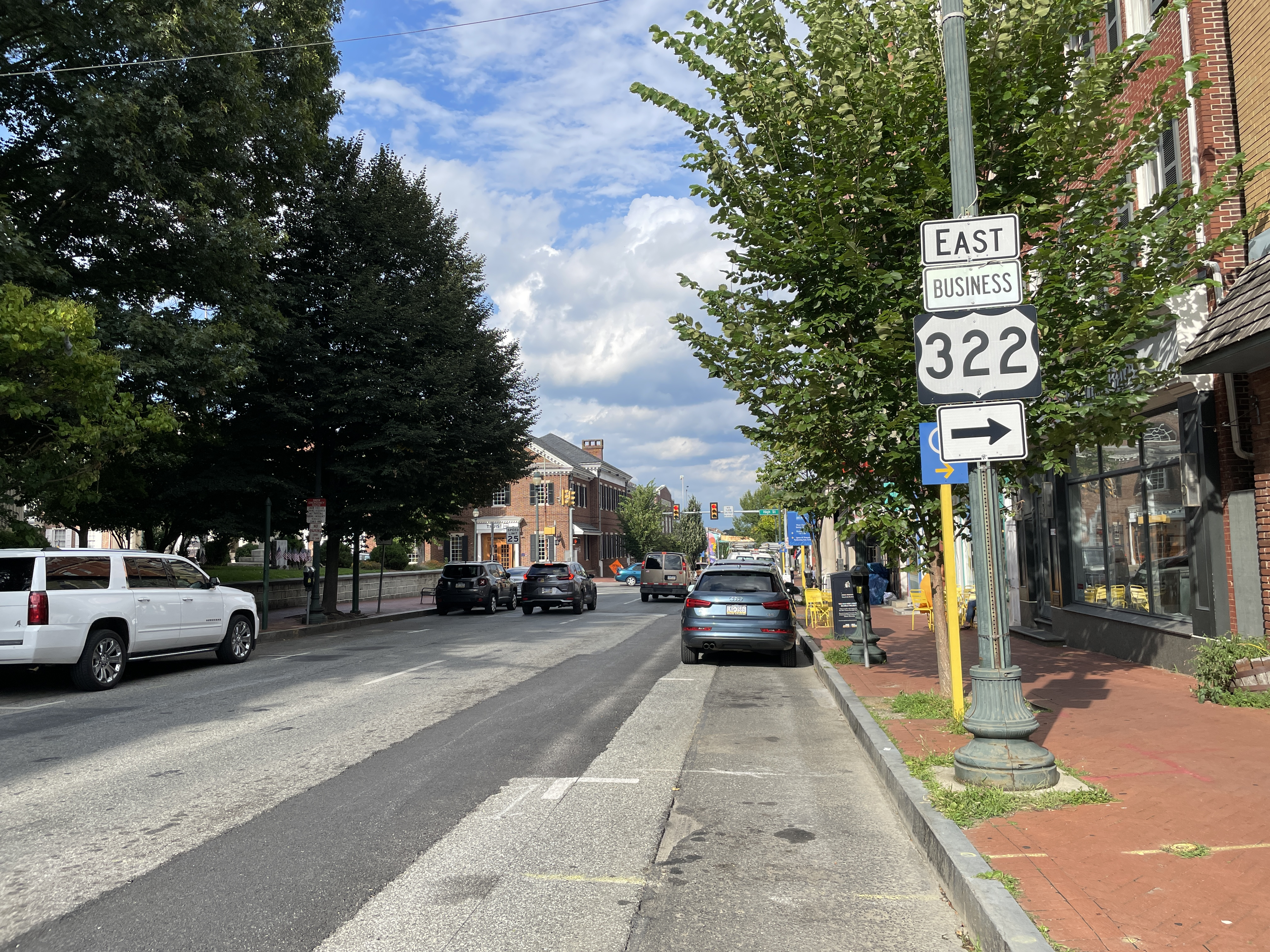
US 322 Bus. eastbound approaching the beginning of PA 3 eastbound in West Chester

When the Sproul Road Bill was passed in 1911, the road leading south from West Chester was designated as part of Legislative Route 135, which continued to the Delaware border, while the road heading northwest from West Chester to Downingtown became Legislative Route 137, which continued to Lebanon. South High Street was designated as part of US 122 in 1926. In 1927, Hannum Avenue and Gay Street became a part of PA 5. PA 29 was designated concurrent with US 122 on South High Street in 1928; in addition, PA 52 and PA 62 followed the street from downtown south to Price Street. By 1930, PA 29 and PA 52 were removed from High Street. During the 1930s, several route designation changes occurred in West Chester. US 122 was replaced by US 202, PA 62 was replaced by PA 100, and US 322 was designated through West Chester along Hannum Avenue, Gay Street, and High Street. US 322 replaced PA 5 on Hannum Avenue and Gay Street and ran concurrent with US 202 on High Street south of downtown, as well as with PA 100 on High Street between downtown and Price Street. In 1957, US 322 was routed onto a limited-access bypass of West Chester to the north and east. As a result, US 322 Bus. replaced the US 322 designation through West Chester. By 1970, US 202 was routed to bypass West Chester along with US 322, removing the concurrency with US 322 Bus. on High Street. By the 1970s, US 322 Bus. was shifted to a one-way pair along Chestnut and Market streets. In 2003, the concurrent PA 100 designation along High Street was removed.

== Major intersections ==
The entire route is in Chester County.

Location	mi	km	Destinations	Notes
East Bradford Township	0.00	0.00	US 322 west (Downingtown Pike)	Continuation west
East Bradford Township	0.00	0.00	US 322 east (West Chester Bypass)	
West Chester	1.024	1.648	PA 162 west (Strasburg Road)	Eastern terminus of PA 162
West Chester	1.675	2.696	PA 3 east (East Market Street)	Western terminus of PA 3
West Chester	1.755	2.824	PA 842 west (West Miner Street)	Eastern terminus of PA 842
West Chester	2.026	3.261	PA 52 south (Price Street) – Lenape, Chadds Ford	Northern terminus of PA 52
West Goshen Township–Westtown Township line	3.229	5.197	US 202 north / US 322 west – Paoli, Downingtown	Interchange
West Goshen Township–Westtown Township line	3.229	5.197	US 202 south / US 322 east – Wilmington, Chester	Continuation east
1.000 mi = 1.609 km; 1.000 km = 0.621 mi
