= Pennsylvania Route 842 =

State highway in Chester County, Pennsylvania, United States

Pennsylvania Route 842

Route information
- Maintained by PennDOT, East Marlborough Township, and Borough of West Chester
- Length: 15.019 mi (24.171 km)
- Tourist routes: Brandywine Valley Scenic Byway

Major junctions
- West end: PA 841 in West Marlborough Township
- PA 82 in Unionville; PA 162 in Unionville
- East end: US 322 Bus. in West Chester

Location
- Country: United States
- State: Pennsylvania
- Counties: Chester

Highway system
- Pennsylvania State Route System; Interstate; US; State; Scenic; Legislative
← PA 841	→ PA 843

Pennsylvania Route 842 (PA 842) is a state highway in Chester County, Pennsylvania. The route runs from PA 841 in West Marlborough Township to U.S. Route 322 Business (US 322 Bus.) in downtown West Chester. PA 842 runs through rural areas with some development between PA 841 and West Chester as a two-lane undivided road. Along this stretch, the route forms a concurrency with PA 82 in Unionville, where it intersects the western terminus of PA 162. In West Chester, PA 842 is routed along one-way streets. PA 842 was first designated by 1928 between PA 82 in Unionville and US 122/PA 5/PA 62 in West Chester. The route was extended west to PA 841 in 1937.

== Route description ==
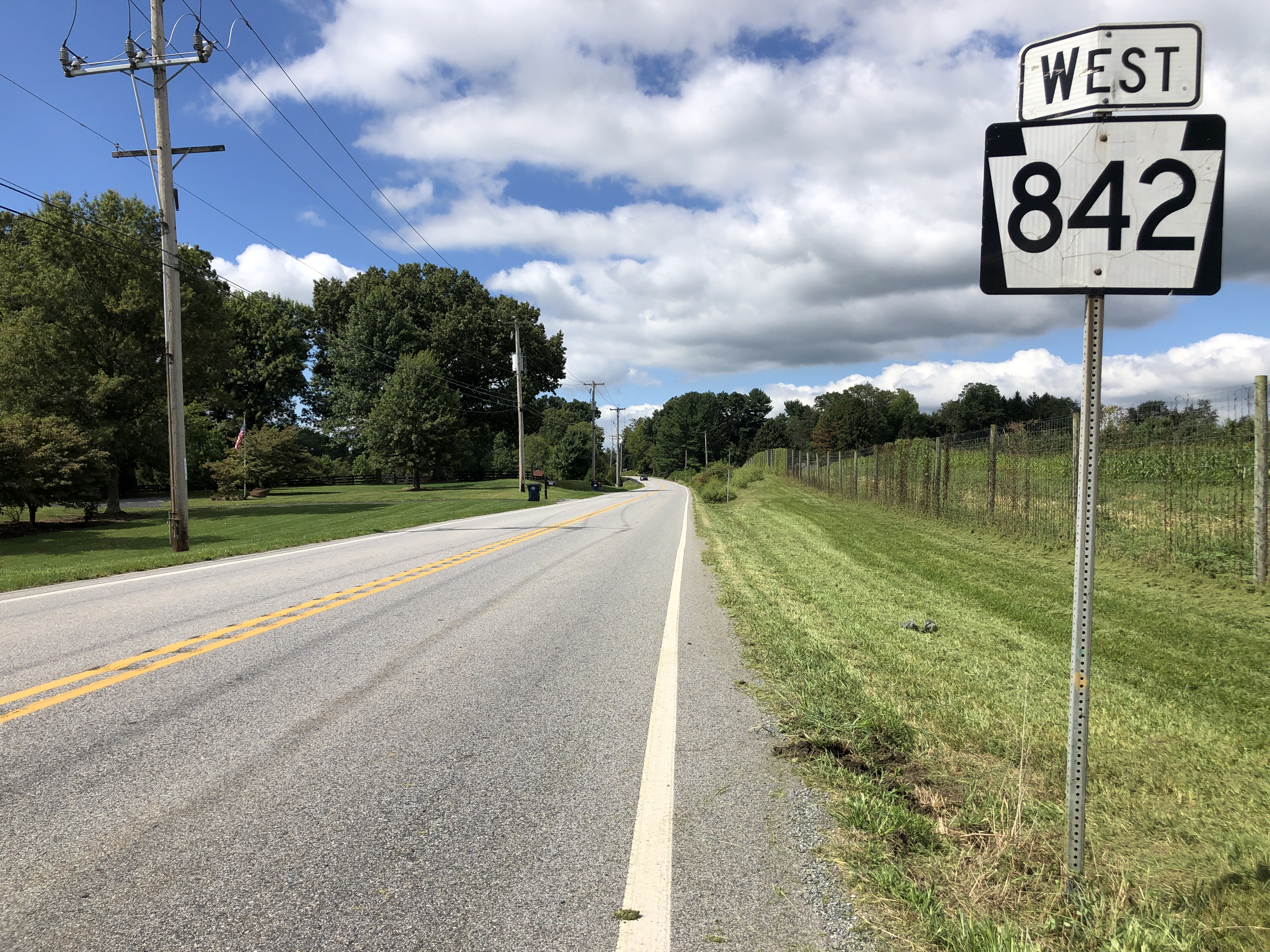
PA 842 westbound in Newlin Township

PA 842 begins at an intersection with PA 841 in West Marlborough Township, Chester County, heading northeast on two-lane undivided Upland Road. The road passes through farmland and woodland, curving to the east. The route continues through rural areas and crosses Newark Road, becoming the border between East Marlborough Township to the north and West Marlborough Township to the south before fully entering East Marlborough Township. PA 842 curves northeast and reaches an intersection with PA 82, where it turns east to form a concurrency with that route on Doe Run Road. The road passes through the residential community of Unionville, where it intersects the western terminus of PA 162. After leaving Unionville, PA 842 splits from PA 82 by turning northeast onto Unionville Wawaset Road. The route continues through woodland with some fields and homes, crossing into Newlin Township. The road heads through more farmland and woodland with some residences and enters Pocopson Township. Here, PA 842 curves north into woodland before curving east through fields and trees. The route crosses an East Penn Railroad line at-grade and the West Branch Brandywine Creek before it heads into East Bradford Township, where it becomes Bridge Road. The road continues through rural areas with some homes and crosses the East Branch Brandywine Creek.

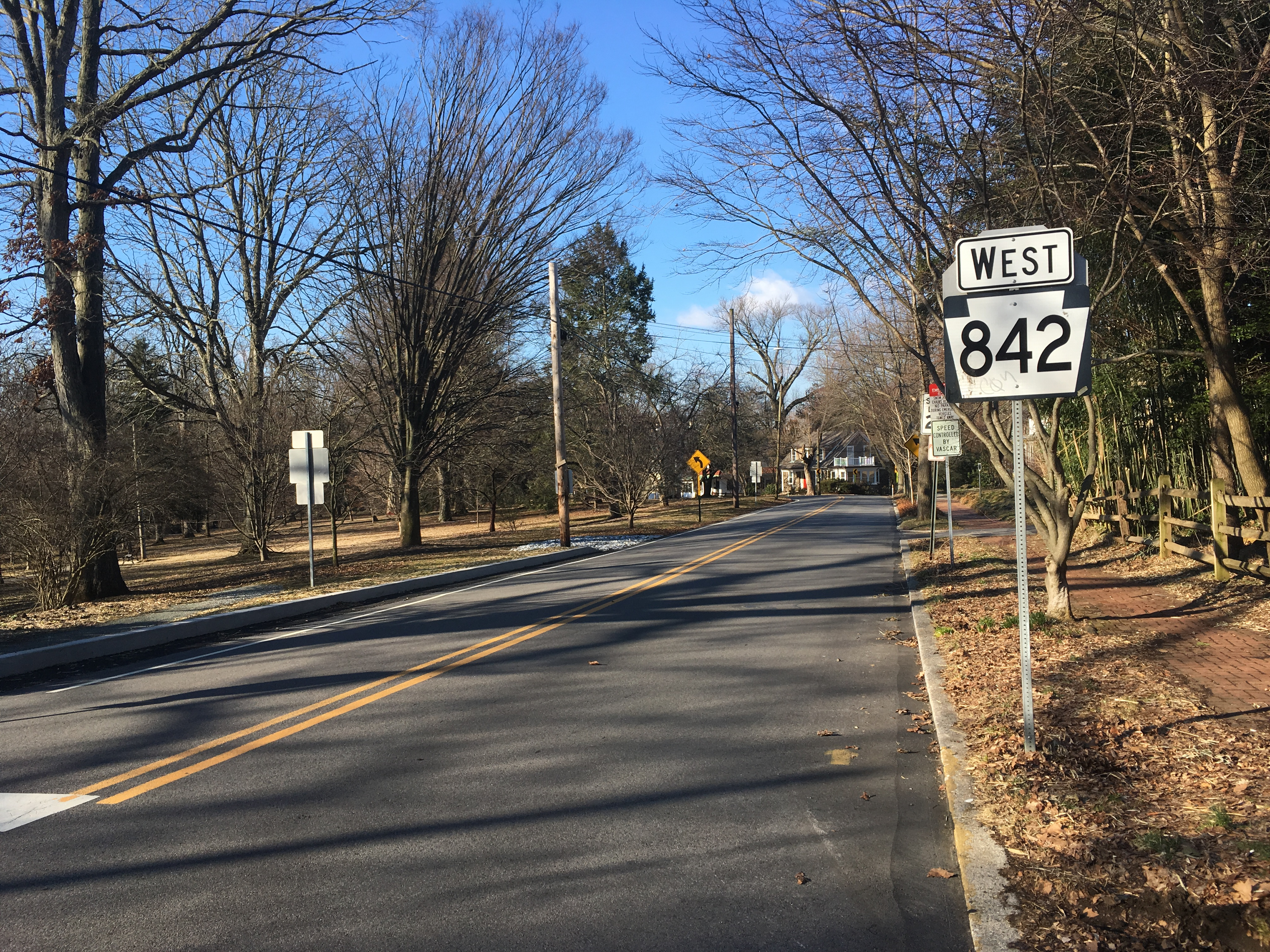
PA 842 westbound past Brandywine Street in West Chester

After this, PA 842 turns northeast onto Creek Road and winds northeast through fields and woods. The route splits from Creek Road and continues northeast on West Miner Street as it heads through wooded areas with some homes. At the Bradford Avenue intersection, the road crosses into the borough of West Chester and continues through residential areas. Here, PA 842 splits into a one-way pair. The eastbound direction turns northwest onto South Brandywine Street before heading northeast onto West Market Street, entering the commercial downtown of West Chester and ending at the eastbound direction of US 322 Bus. at the intersection of West Market Street and New Street. Westbound PA 842 begins at US 322 Bus. at the intersection of South High Street and Miner Street and runs west along West Miner Street past homes.

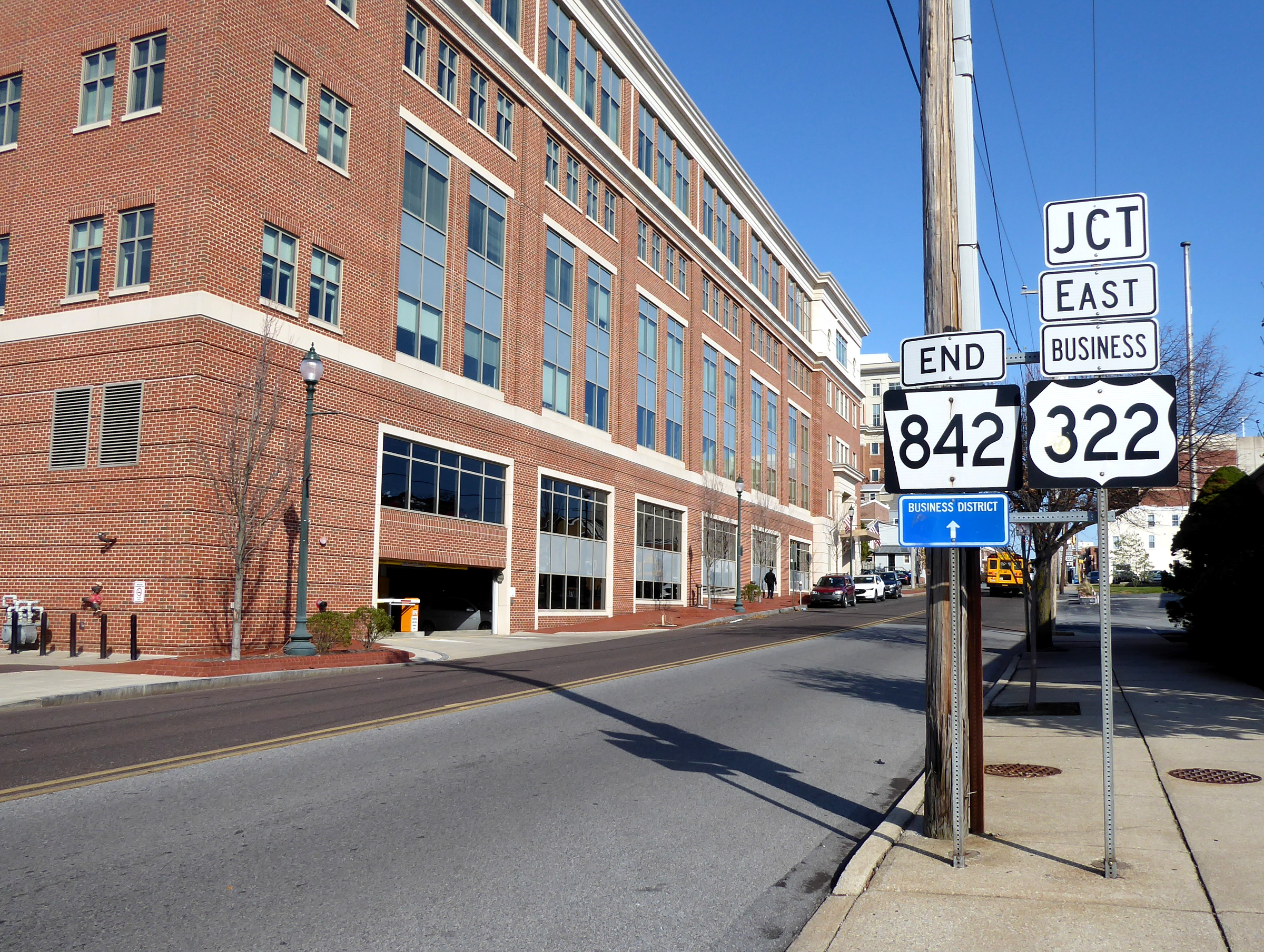
PA 842 eastern terminus at US 322 Bus. in West Chester

The section of PA 842 along Creek Road in East Bradford Township is part of the Brandywine Valley Scenic Byway, a Pennsylvania Scenic Byway.

== History ==
Miner Street in West Chester, which comprises part of PA 842, was laid out in 1831 as part of an expansion of West Chester built by William Everhart. The street was named for Charles Miner, a West Chester resident. When Pennsylvania first legislated routes in 1911, what would become PA 842 was not legislated as part of a route. PA 842 was first designated by 1928 to run from PA 82 in Unionville east to US 122/PA 5/PA 62 (now US 322 Bus.) in West Chester, following its current alignment. In 1937, PA 842 was extended west from Unionville to its current western terminus at PA 841. PA 842 has remained on the same alignment since.

== Major intersections ==
The entire route is in Chester County.

Location	mi	km	Destinations	Notes
West Marlborough Township	0.000	0.000	PA 841 (North Chatham Road) – Chatham, Springdell	Western terminus
East Marlborough Township	5.503	8.856	PA 82 north (West Doe Run Road)	Western terminus of PA 82 concurrency
East Marlborough Township	5.763	9.275	PA 162 east (Embreeville Road)	Western terminus of PA 162
East Marlborough Township	5.823	9.371	PA 82 south (West Doe Run Road)	Eastern terminus of PA 82 concurrency
West Chester	15.019	24.171	US 322 Bus. east (West Market Street) to US 322 Bus. west	Continuation east
1.000 mi = 1.609 km; 1.000 km = 0.621 mi: Concurrency terminus; Incomplete access
