= Pennsylvania Route 162 =

State highway in Chester County, Pennsylvania, United States

Pennsylvania Route 162

Route information
- Maintained by PennDOT
- Length: 10.144 mi (16.325 km)
- Existed: 1928–present
- Tourist routes: Brandywine Valley Scenic Byway

Major junctions
- West end: PA 82 / PA 842 in Unionville
- East end: US 322 Bus. in West Chester

Location
- Country: United States
- State: Pennsylvania
- Counties: Chester

Highway system
- Pennsylvania State Route System; Interstate; US; State; Scenic; Legislative
← PA 161	→ PA 163

Pennsylvania Route 162 (PA 162) is a 10.1-mile-long (16.3 km) state highway in Chester County in southeast Pennsylvania. The western terminus of the route is at PA 82/PA 842 in Unionville. The eastern terminus is at U.S. Route 322 Business (US 322 Bus.) in West Chester. PA 162 is known as Embreeville Road from its western terminus to the village of Embreeville and Telegraph Road from Embreeville to an intersection with Strasburg Road west of Marshallton. At this point, the route turns east, following Strasburg Road to US 322 Bus. in West Chester. The portion of road between Marshallton and West Chester follows the 17th-century Great Minquas Path and became part of the Strasburg Road linking Strasburg and Philadelphia in the 1770s. PA 162 was designated onto its current alignment by 1930.

== Route description ==
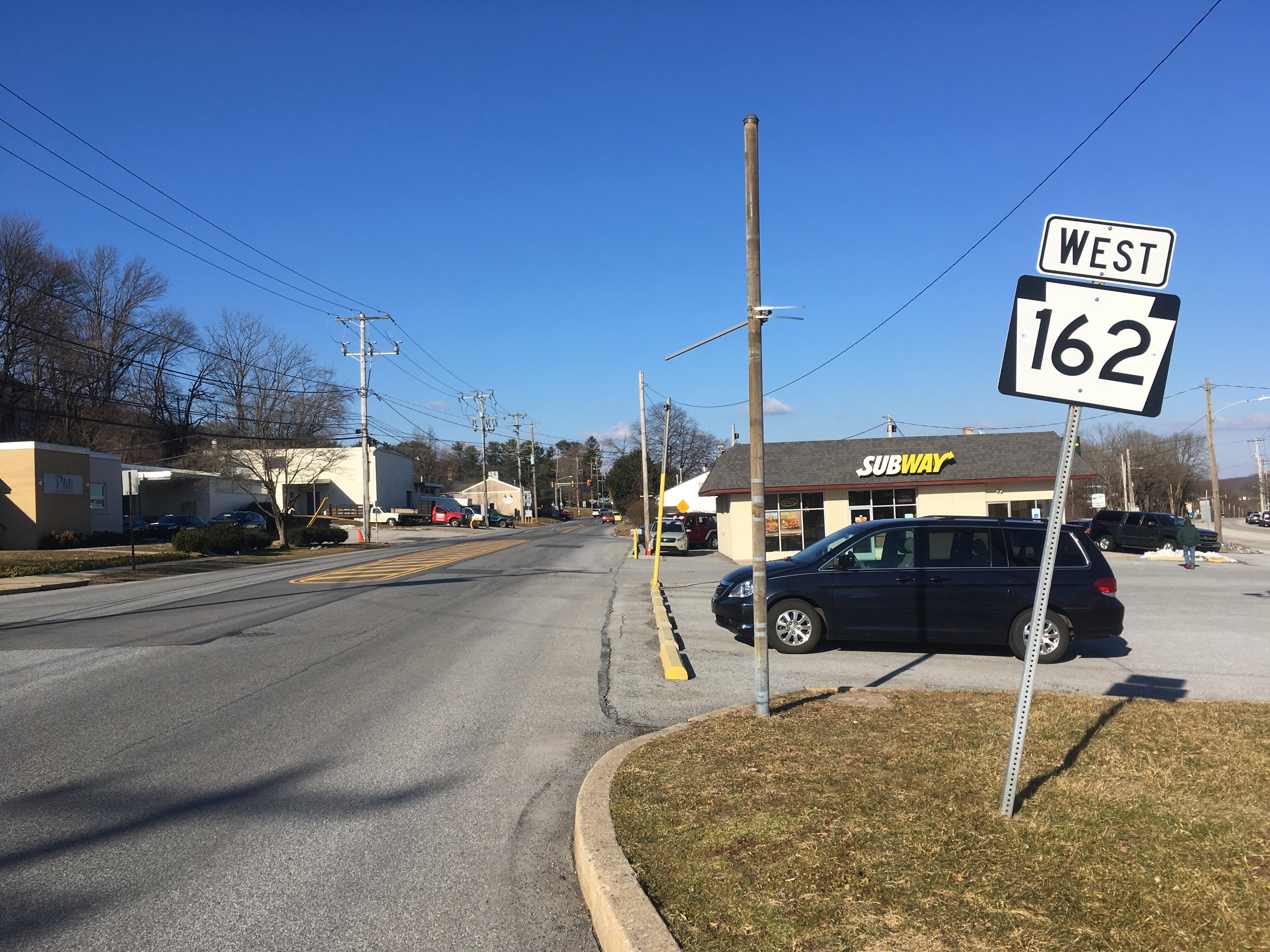
PA 162 westbound past its eastern terminus at US 322 Bus. in West Chester

PA 162 begins at an intersection with PA 82/PA 842 in the community of Unionville in East Marlborough Township, heading north on two-lane undivided Embreeville Road. The road heads through a mix of farms and woods, crossing into Newlin Township. The route makes a sharp turn east and north again as it crosses the West Branch Brandywine Creek, which begins to run to the east of the route. PA 162 enters Embreeville, where the road crosses an East Penn Railroad line at-grade and passes a few homes. Leaving Embreeville, the road heads into forested areas and makes a turn to the east, continuing to parallel the creek. As PA 162 moves away from the creek, it crosses into West Bradford Township and passes to the south of the closed Embreeville State Hospital before continuing past a mix of fields and woods as Telegraph Road. The route bears east onto Strasburg Road and passes woodland and homes, running through the community of Marshallton. After entering East Bradford Township, PA 162 crosses the East Branch Brandywine Creek on Cope's Bridge and intersects North Creek Road as it heads into increasing areas of residential subdivisions. The road gains a center left-turn lane and enters commercial areas as it crosses into the borough of West Chester at the Bradford Avenue intersection, coming to its eastern terminus at US 322 Bus.

The section of PA 162 between North Creek Road in East Bradford Township and Bradford Avenue in West Chester is part of the Brandywine Valley Scenic Byway, a Pennsylvania Scenic Byway.

== History ==
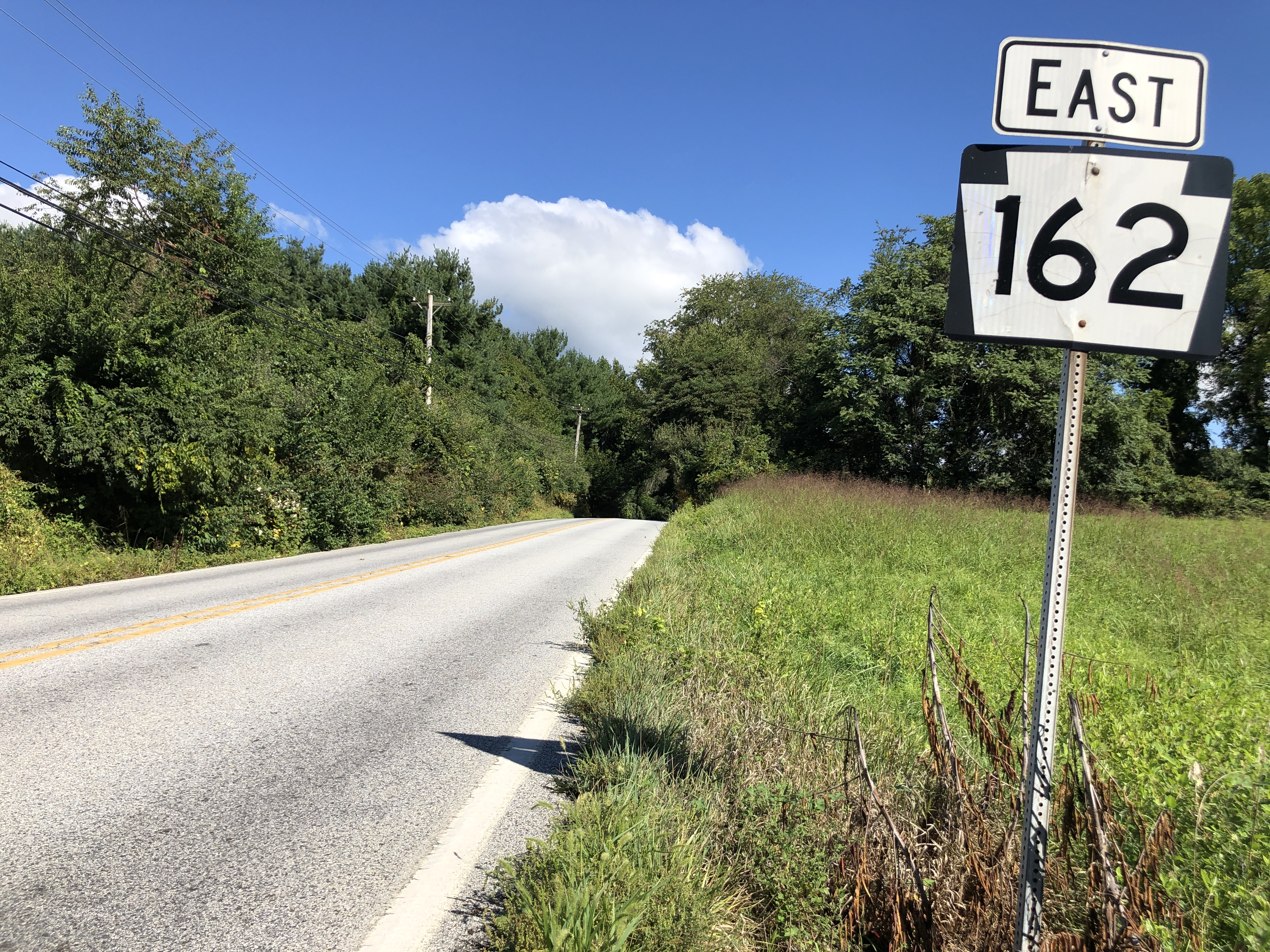
PA 162 eastbound in Newlin Township

The portion of PA 162 between Marshallton and West Chester follows a Native American path known as the Great Minquas Path, which dates back to 1620. In 1772 and 1773, the road between Marshallton and West Chester was surveyed as part of the Strasburg Road, which ran between Strasburg and Philadelphia. The survey was conducted by John Sellers and others under the colonial administration of Governor Richard Penn. This road was completed under a new administration of an independent state of Pennsylvania. When Pennsylvania first legislated routes in 1911, the current alignment of PA 162 was legislated as part of Legislative Route 273, which ran from Kennett Square to West Chester. PA 162 was designated to follow its current alignment between PA 82/PA 842 in Unionville and PA 5 (now US 322 Bus.) in West Chester in 1928. At this time, the road was paved between Embreeville and West Chester. By 1930, the road between Unionville and Embreeville was paved. PA 162 has remained on the same alignment since.

On September 1, 2021, the remnants of Hurricane Ida produced torrential rain over the region, causing severe flooding on the West Branch Brandywine Creek. The flood damaged the Embreeville Bridge, a historic concrete arch bridge constructed in 1923, resulting in its closure for over a year. The bridge was reopened on January 13, 2023, following the replacement of the closed spandrel arch span of the bridge with a precast concrete arch. The reinforced concrete retaining walls adjacent to the arch were also replaced.

== Major intersections ==
The entire route is in Chester County.

Location	mi	km	Destinations	Notes
East Marlborough Township	0.000	0.000	PA 82 / PA 842 (West Doe Run Road)	Western terminus
West Chester	10.144	16.325	US 322 Bus. (Downingtown Pike) – Downingtown, West Chester	Eastern terminus
1.000 mi = 1.609 km; 1.000 km = 0.621 mi
