= List of highways numbered 162 =

Route 162, or Highway 162, may refer to:

== Canada ==
- Nova Scotia Highway 162
- Prince Edward Island Route 162
- Quebec Route 162

== India ==
- National Highway 162 (India)

== Ireland ==
- R162 road (Ireland)

== Japan ==
- Japan National Route 162

== United States ==
- Alabama State Route 162
- Arkansas Highway 162
- California State Route 162
- Connecticut Route 162
- Georgia State Route 162
- Idaho State Highway 162
- Illinois Route 162
- Indiana State Road 162
- Kentucky Route 162
- Louisiana Highway 162
- Maine State Route 162
- Maryland Route 162
- M-162 (Michigan highway)
- Missouri Route 162
- Nevada State Route 162
- New Jersey Route 162
- New Mexico State Road 162
- New York State Route 162
- North Carolina Highway 162
- Ohio State Route 162
- Oklahoma State Highway 162
- Pennsylvania Route 162
- South Carolina Highway 162
- Tennessee State Route 162
- Texas State Highway 162 (former)
  - Texas State Highway Spur 162
  - Farm to Market Road 162
- Utah State Route 162
- Virginia State Route 162
- Washington State Route 162
- Wisconsin Highway 162

Territories

- Puerto Rico Highway 162

Preceded by 161	Lists of highways 162	Succeeded by 163
