= PA5 =

PA5 may refer to:

- Paranormal Activity 5, a supernatural horror film
- Pennsylvania Route 5
- Pennsylvania Route 5 (1920s)
- Pennsylvania's 5th congressional district
- Pitcairn PA-5 Mailwing
- The PA5, a type of rolling stock used on the PATH train in New York and New Jersey
