= Lenape Bridge =

- U.S. National Register of Historic Places
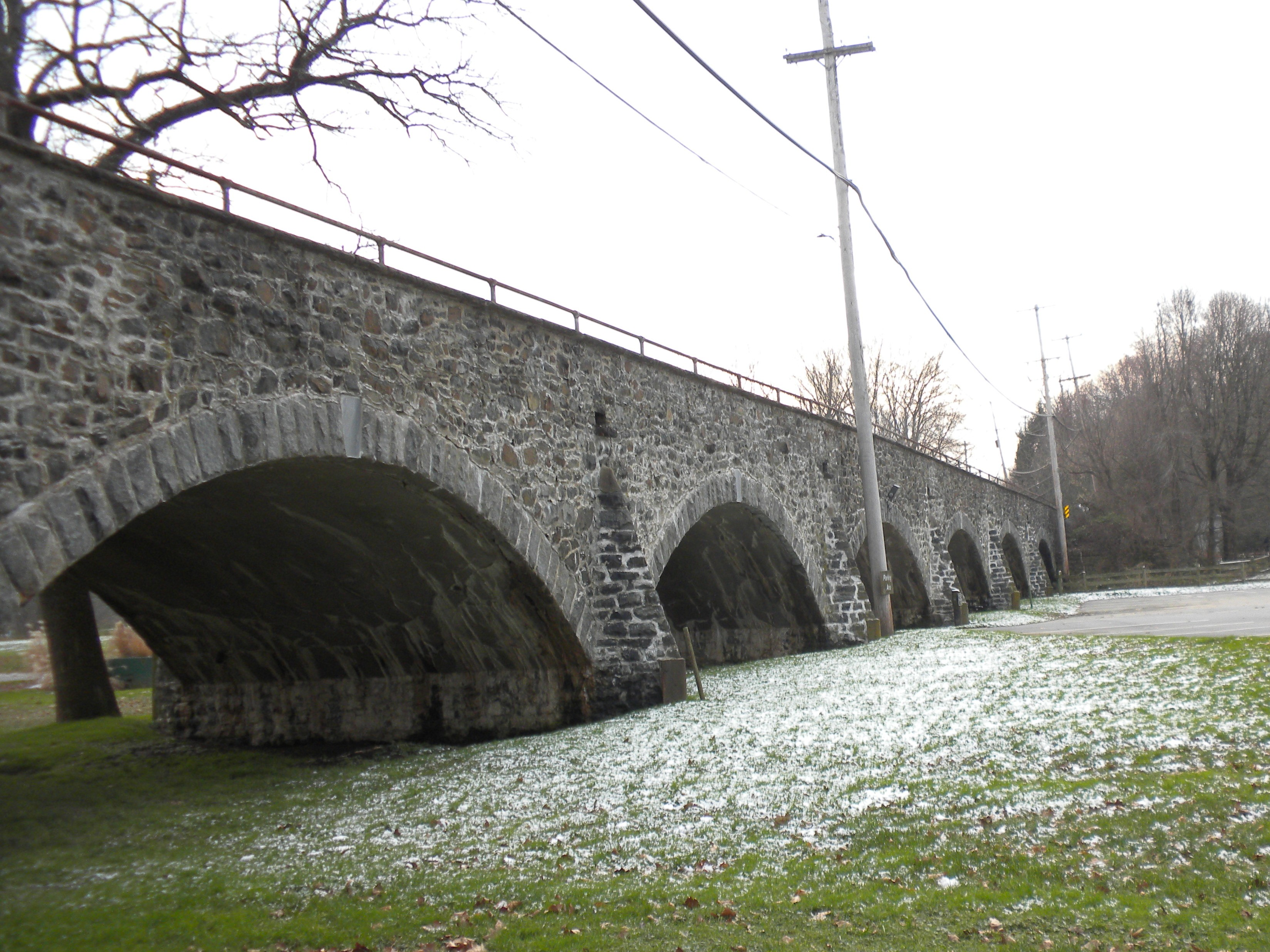
- Lenape Bridge, December 2009

- Location within Pennsylvania Location within the United States
- Location: Pennsylvania Route 52 over parking lot, Birmingham Township and Pocopson Township, Pennsylvania
- Coordinates: 39°54′54″N 75°37′47″W
- Area: less than one acre
- Built: 1911–1912
- Built by: Corcorn Construction Co.
- Architectural style: Multiple span stone arch
- MPS: Highway Bridges Owned by the Commonwealth of Pennsylvania, Department of Transportation TR
- NRHP reference No.: 88000781
- Added to NRHP: June 22, 1988

Lenape Bridge is a historic stone arch bridge located in Birmingham Township and Pocopson Township, Chester County, Pennsylvania. It has a seven spans, each 44-foot-long (13 m), with a total length of 308-foot (94 m). The bridge was constructed in 1911–1912, of random rubble stone.

It was listed on the National Register of Historic Places in 1988.
