= List of highways numbered 163 =

The following highways are numbered 163:

== Brazil ==
- BR-163

== Canada ==
- Prince Edward Island Route 163

== Costa Rica ==
- National Route 163

== India ==
- National Highway 163 (India)

== Japan ==
- Japan National Route 163

== United Kingdom ==
- A163 road.

== United States ==
- U.S. Route 163
  - U.S. Route 163 (former)
- Alabama State Route 163
- Arkansas Highway 163
  - Arkansas Highway 163 Spur
  - Arkansas State Road 163 (former)
- California State Route 163
- Connecticut Route 163
- Florida State Road 163
- Georgia State Route 163 (former)
- Illinois Route 163
- Indiana State Road 163
- Iowa Highway 163
- K-163 (Kansas highway)
- Kentucky Route 163
- Louisiana Highway 163
- Maine State Route 163
- Missouri Route 163
- Nevada State Route 163
- New Jersey Route 163
- New Mexico State Road 163
- New York State Route 163
- North Carolina Highway 163
- Ohio State Route 163
- Pennsylvania Route 163
- Tennessee State Route 163
- Texas State Highway 163
  - Texas State Highway Loop 163
- Utah State Route 163 (former)
- Virginia State Route 163
- Washington State Route 163
- Wisconsin Highway 163 (former)

Territories:

- Puerto Rico Highway 163

Preceded by 162	Lists of highways 163	Succeeded by 164
