= Lenape, Pennsylvania =

Unincorporated community in Pennsylvania, US

- Unincorporated community
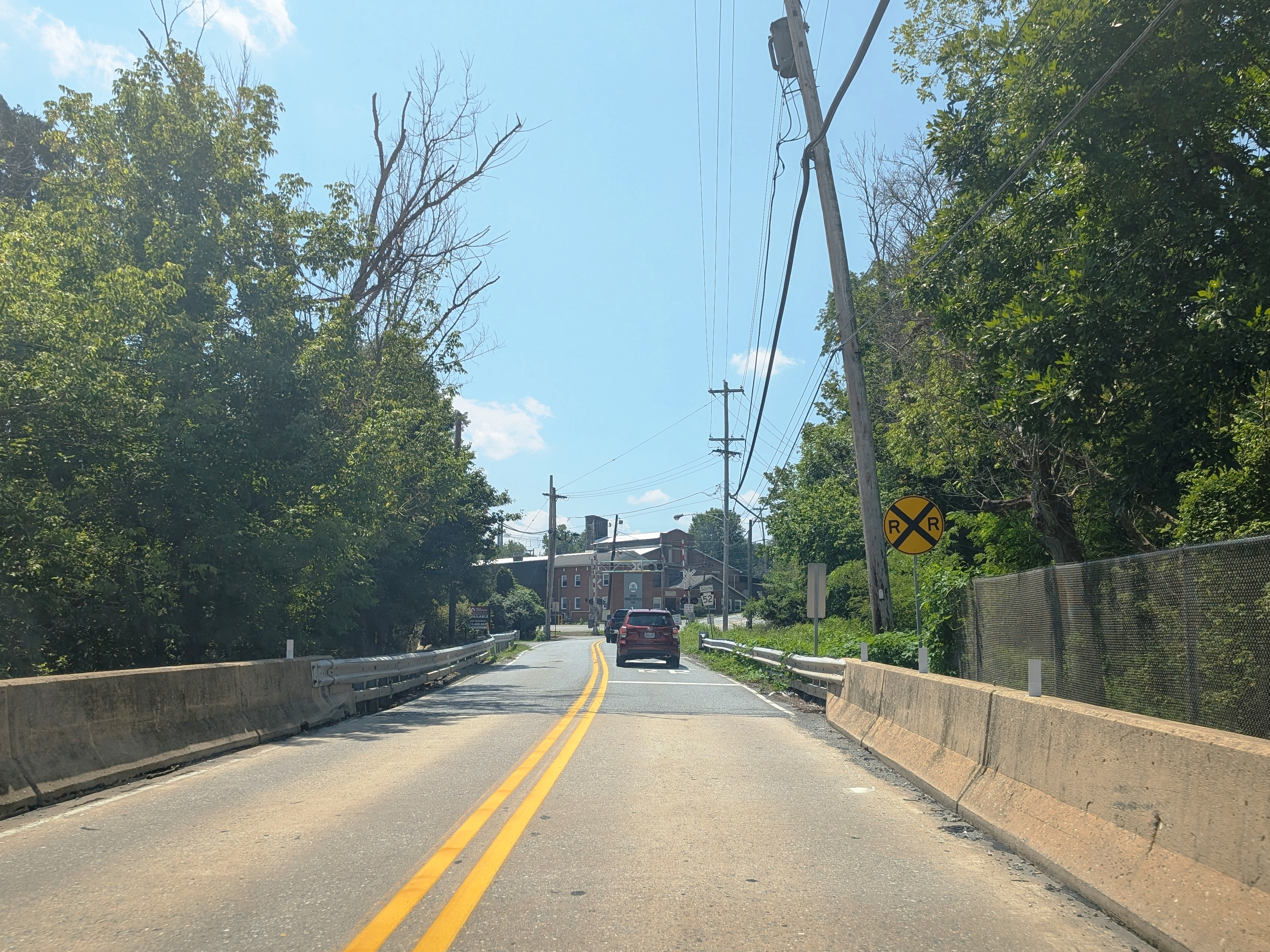
- PA 52 southbound entering Lenape

- Location within Pennsylvania Location within the United States
- Coordinates: 39°54′46″N 75°37′54″W
- Country: United States
- State: Pennsylvania
- County: Chester
- Township: Pocopson
- Elevation: 194 ft (59 m)
- Time zone: UTC-5 (Eastern (EST))
  - Summer (DST): UTC-4 (EDT)
- Area codes: 610 and 484
- GNIS feature ID: 1204010

Lenape is an unincorporated community in Pocopson Township in Chester County, Pennsylvania, United States. Lenape is centered on the intersection of Pennsylvania Route 52 and Pocopson Road, west of the Brandywine Creek.

== History ==
A post office called Lenape was established in 1870, and remained in operation until it was discontinued in 1923. The community was named after the Lenape Indians.
