= List of highways numbered 161 =

The following highways are numbered 161:

== Canada ==
- New Brunswick Route 161
- Prince Edward Island Route 161
- Quebec Route 161

== Costa Rica ==
- National Route 161

== India ==
- National Highway 161

== Ireland ==
- R161 road (Ireland)

== Japan ==
- Japan National Route 161

== United Kingdom ==
- A161 from Beckingham to Goole
- B161 road from A114 (Forest Gate) to A112 (near Leyton)

== United States ==
- U.S. Highway 161 (former)
- Alabama State Route 161
- Arkansas Highway 161
- California State Route 161
- Connecticut Route 161
- Florida State Road 161
- Georgia State Route 161 (former)
- Illinois Route 161
- Indiana State Road 161
- Iowa Highway 161 (former)
- K-161 (Kansas highway)
- Kentucky Route 161
- Louisiana Highway 161
- Maine State Route 161
- Maryland Route 161
- Mississippi Highway 161
- Missouri Route 161
- Nevada State Route 161
- New Jersey Route 161
- New Mexico State Road 161
- New York State Route 161
- North Carolina Highway 161
- Ohio State Route 161
- Pennsylvania Route 161 (former)
- South Carolina Highway 161
- Tennessee State Route 161
- Texas State Highway 161
  - Texas State Highway Spur 161
- Utah State Route 161
- Virginia State Route 161
- Washington State Route 161
- West Virginia Route 161
- Wisconsin Highway 161
- Wyoming Highway 161

Territories

- Puerto Rico Highway 161

Preceded by 160	Lists of highways 161	Succeeded by 162
