= Wilkinson House (Pocopson Township, Pennsylvania) =

Historic house in Pennsylvania, United States

- U.S. National Register of Historic Places
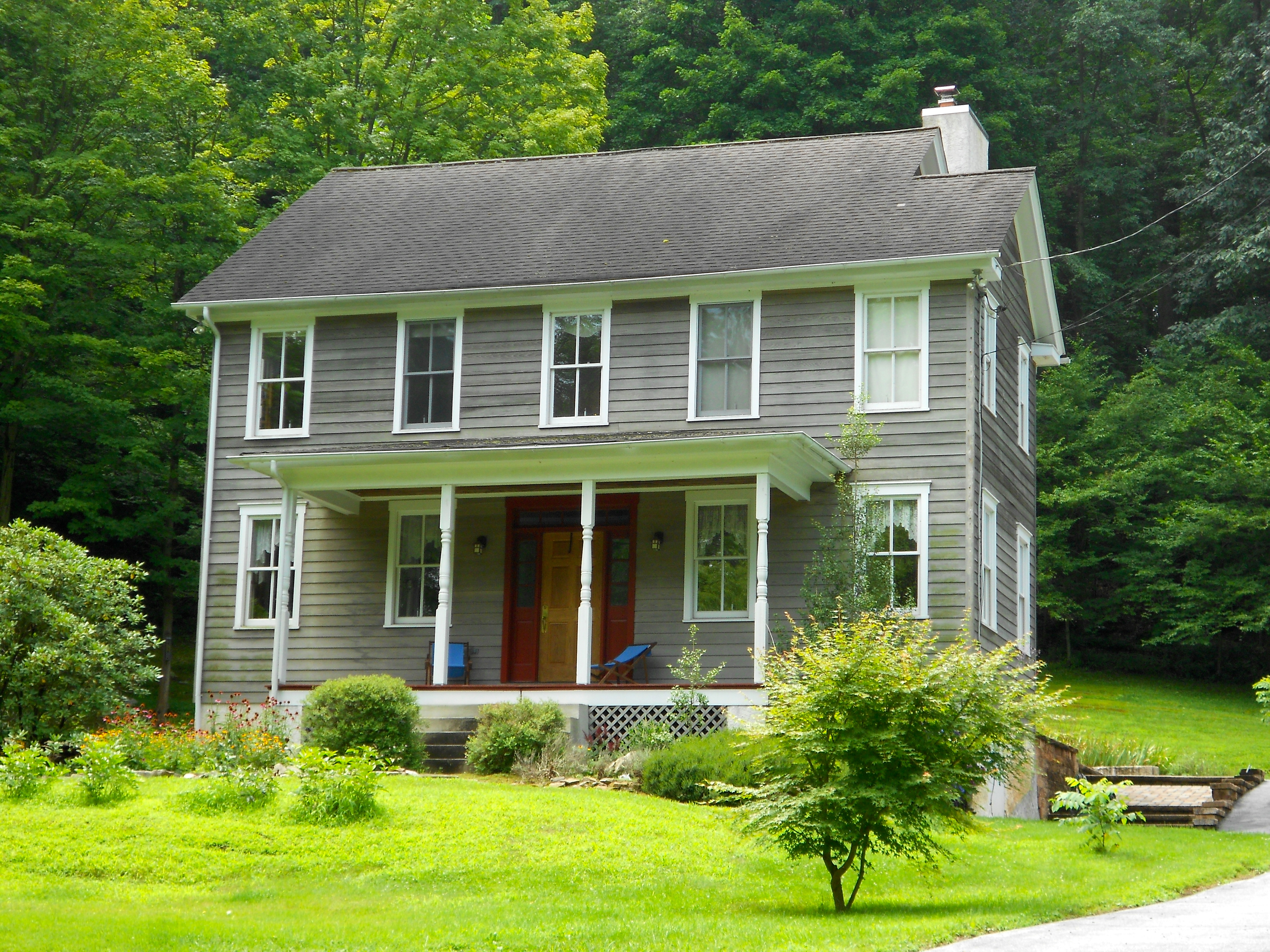
- House in 2013. The cross gable has been removed.

- Location within Pennsylvania Location within the United States
- Location: Rt. 842, Pocopson Township, Pennsylvania
- Coordinates: 39°55′33″N 75°39′57″W
- Area: 2 acres (0.81 ha)
- Built: c. 1884
- Architectural style: Rural Gothic
- MPS: West Branch Brandywine Creek MRA
- NRHP reference No.: 85002379
- Added to NRHP: September 16, 1985

Wilkinson House is a historic home located in Pocopson Township, Chester County, Pennsylvania. The house was built about 1884, and is a two-story, five-bay, frame dwelling with German siding in a Rural Gothic style. It has a full basement and attic and a cross gable roof. It features a three-bay front porch with decorative scrollwork.

It was added to the National Register of Historic Places in 1985.
