= Pennsylvania Route 52 =

State highway in Pennsylvania, US

Pennsylvania Route 52

Route information
- Maintained by PennDOT
- Length: 11.782 mi (18.961 km)
- Existed: 1928–present
- Tourist routes: Brandywine Valley Scenic Byway

Major junctions
- South end: DE 52 at the Delaware state line in Pennsbury Township
- US 1 in Kennett Township; PA 926 in Pennsbury Township
- North end: US 322 Bus. in West Chester

Location
- Country: United States
- State: Pennsylvania
- Counties: Chester

Highway system
- Pennsylvania State Route System; Interstate; US; State; Scenic; Legislative
← PA 51	→ PA 53

Pennsylvania Route 52 (PA 52) is a 11.8-mile-long (19.0 km) state highway located in southeast Pennsylvania. The southern terminus of the route is at the Pennsylvania-Delaware state line near Kennett Square, where the road continues as Delaware Route 52 (DE 52). The northern terminus is at U.S. Route 322 Business (US 322 Bus.) in West Chester. Near the Kennett Township community of Longwood, it has about a 1-mile (1.6 km) wrong-way concurrency with US 1. PA 52 passes through suburban and rural areas along its route.

PA 52 was first designated by 1928, continuing northeast from West Chester to New Hope along a concurrency with US 122 (later US 202). This concurrency was removed by 1930 and the northern terminus of PA 52 was cut back to its current location in West Chester. In 2011, a portion of PA 52 north of US 1 was realigned.

== Route description ==
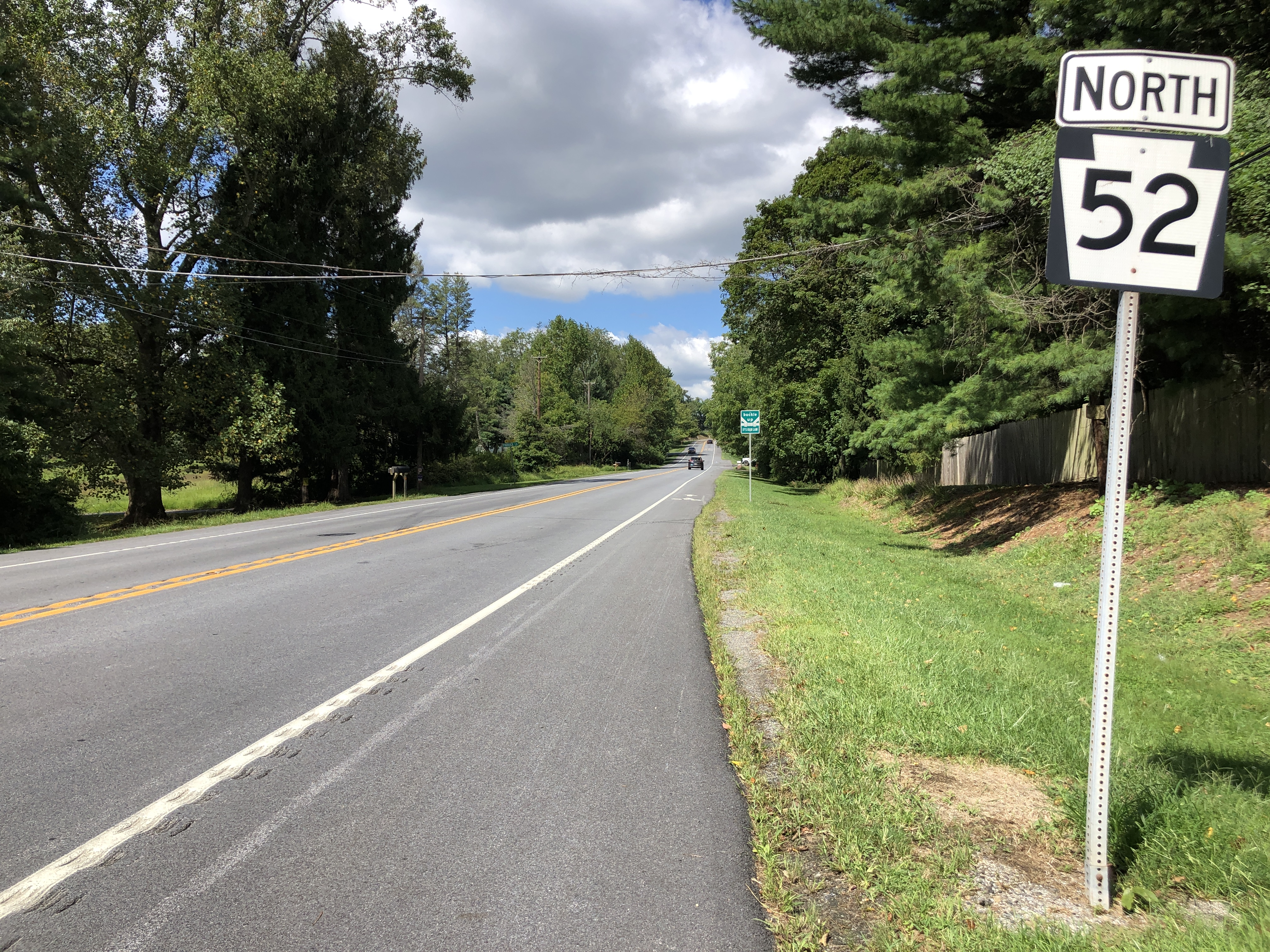
PA 52 northbound in Pennsbury Township

PA 52 begins at the Delaware border in Pennsbury Township, Chester County, at which point the road continues south into Delaware as DE 52. From the state line, the route heads north-northwest on two-lane undivided Kennett Pike through wooded residential areas. The road enters Kennett Township and heads northwest to the community of Mendenhall, where it crosses an East Penn Railroad line at-grade. Farther northwest, PA 52 comes to an intersection with US 1 (Baltimore Pike) in the community of Hamorton and turns west to form a concurrency with that route, which is a four-lane divided highway that passes fields. Near Longwood Gardens, PA 52 splits from US 1 by heading north on two-lane undivided Lenape Road. The road runs a short distance east of the border between East Marlborough Township to the west and Pennsbury Township to the east as it passes through a mix of woods and fields, intersecting PA 926 (Street Road).

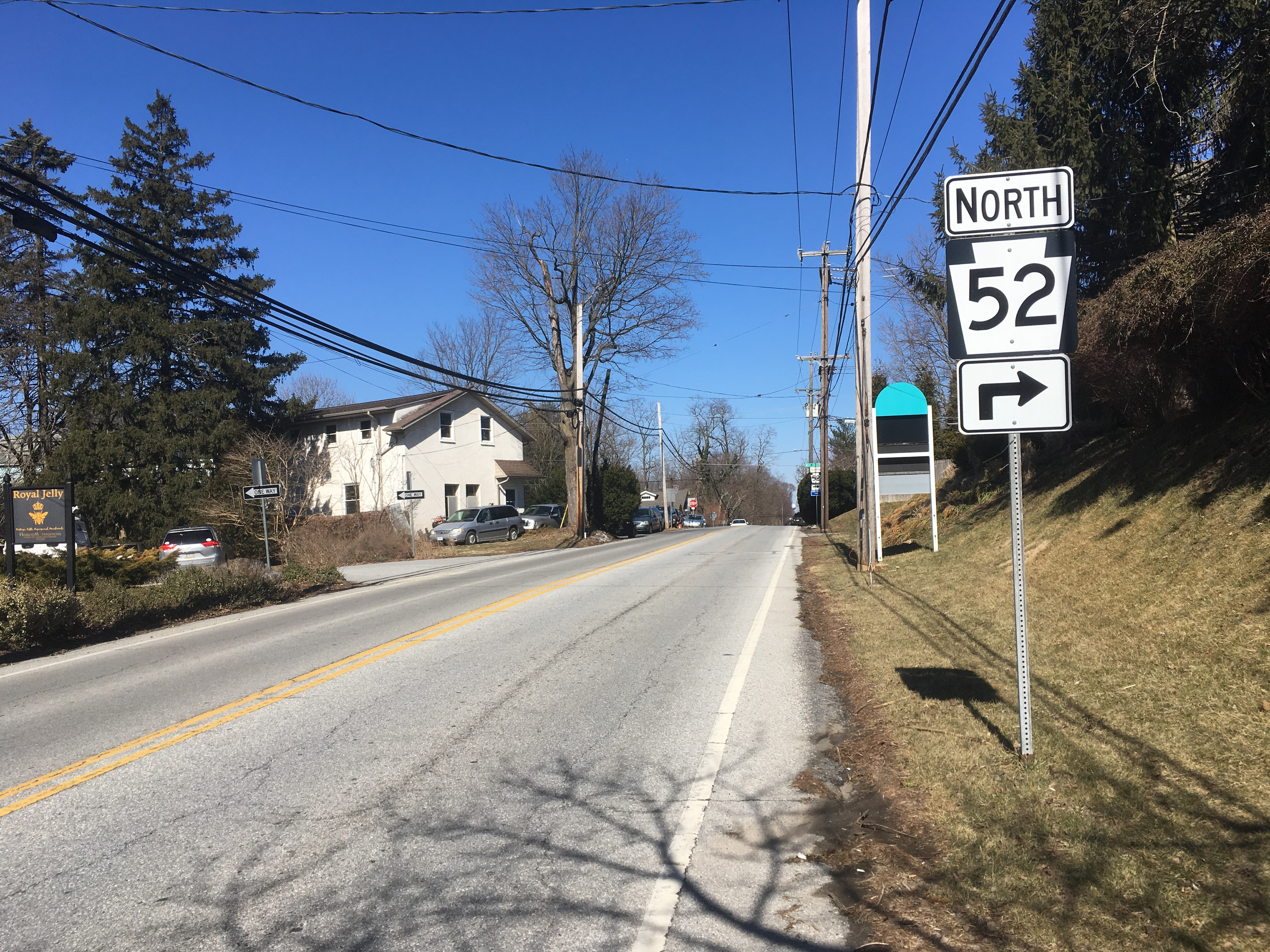
PA 52 northbound approaching the turn onto Price Street in West Chester

Past this intersection, the road passes through forested residential areas, crossing into Pocopson Township as it winds more to the northeast and reaches a roundabout with Lenape Unionville Road and South Wawaset Road. In the community of Lenape, PA 52 heads across another East Penn Railroad line at-grade prior to crossing the Brandywine Creek and then over a parking lot on the Lenape Bridge into Birmingham Township. Here, the road turns northwest onto Creek Road (the old alignment of PA 100) prior to continuing northeast along Lenape Road into East Bradford Township. The route passes through areas of woods, fields, and housing developments prior to intersecting West Rosedale Avenue. At this point, PA 52 heads northwest on Bradford Avenue, forming the border between East Bradford Township to the west and the borough of West Chester to the east, passing homes. The route makes a turn northeast onto Price Street, fully entering West Chester, where it continues through residential areas. The route comes to its northern terminus at US 322 Bus. (South High Street) a short distance north of the West Chester University campus. At this intersection, the old alignment of PA 100 turned north onto South High Street.

The section of PA 52 south of West Chester is part of the Brandywine Valley Scenic Byway, a Pennsylvania Scenic Byway.

== History ==
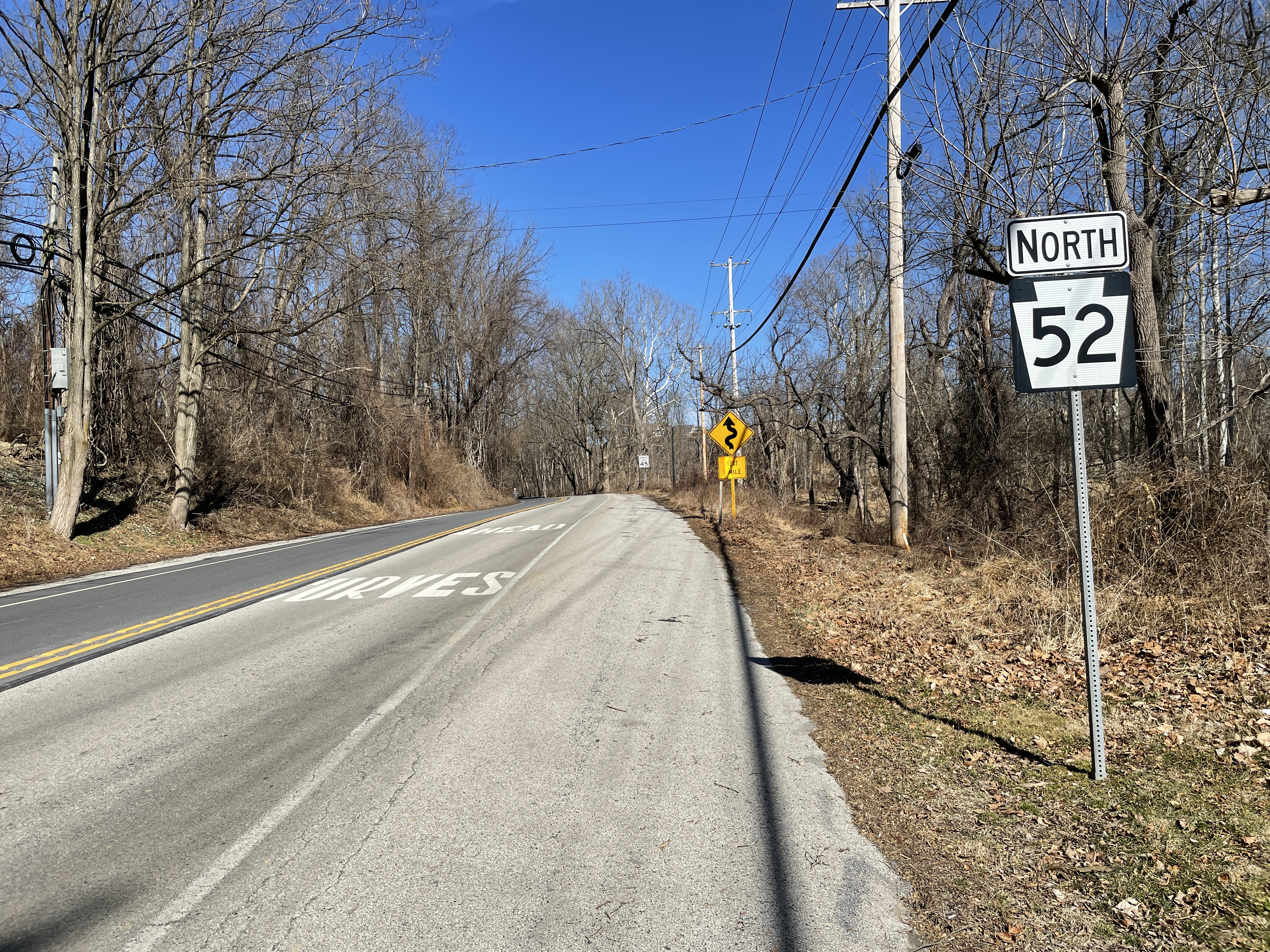
PA 52 northbound in East Bradford Township

When Pennsylvania first legislated routes in 1911, what would become PA 52 was legislated as Legislative Route 134 between the Delaware border and West Chester, Legislative Route 143 between West Chester and Norristown, Legislative Route 178 between Norristown and Buckingham, and Legislative Route 155 between Buckingham and New Hope. PA 52 was first designated by 1928 to run from the Delaware border northeast to the New Jersey border at the Delaware River in New Hope, following its current routing to West Chester, where it reached an intersection with US 122 at High Street. PA 52 ran concurrent with US 122 between West Chester and New Hope by way of Paoli, King of Prussia, Norristown, Montgomeryville, Chalfont, Doylestown, and Buckingham. By 1930, the concurrency with US 122 (later US 202) was removed, leaving the northern terminus at US 122 (High Street, now US 322 Bus.). When first assigned, PA 52 ran concurrent with PA 62 between Lenape and West Chester. In 1932, PA 62 was renumbered to PA 100. In 2003, the PA 100 concurrency was removed when the southern terminus of that route was cut back from the Delaware border to north of West Chester.

In 2010, construction began to relocate PA 52 onto a new alignment between US 1 and PA 926 in order to improve traffic flow. This shortened but did not eliminate the wrong-way concurrency between US 1 and PA 52. The new alignment of PA 52 opened on October 25, 2011 at a cost of $15.4 million. With completion of the new alignment, the former PA 52 south of Webb Barn Lane became an access road to Longwood Gardens while the rest of the road was slated to be torn up.

== Major intersections ==
The entire route is in Chester County.

Location	mi	km	Destinations	Notes
Pennsbury Township	0.000	0.000	DE 52 south	Delaware state line; southern terminus
Kennett Township	2.987	4.807	US 1 north (Baltimore Pike) – Chadds Ford	Southern terminus of US 1 concurrency
Kennett Township	3.675	5.914	US 1 south (Baltimore Pike) – Kennett Square	Northern terminus of US 1 concurrency
Pennsbury Township	4.618	7.432	PA 926 – Oxford, Newtown Square	
West Chester	11.782	18.961	US 322 Bus. (South High Street)	Northern terminus
1.000 mi = 1.609 km; 1.000 km = 0.621 mi: Concurrency terminus

== PA 52 Alternate Truck ==
PA Route 52 Alternate Truck
- Location: Kennett Square–West Chester
- Length: 12.0 mi (19.3 km)
- Existed: 2017–present

Pennsylvania Route 52 Alternate Truck is a truck route that bypasses the historic Lenape Bridge on which trucks and trailers over 28.5 feet long are prohibited. The route follows US 1, US 202/322, and US 322 Business throughout portions of Chester and Delaware counties. The route was signed in 2017.

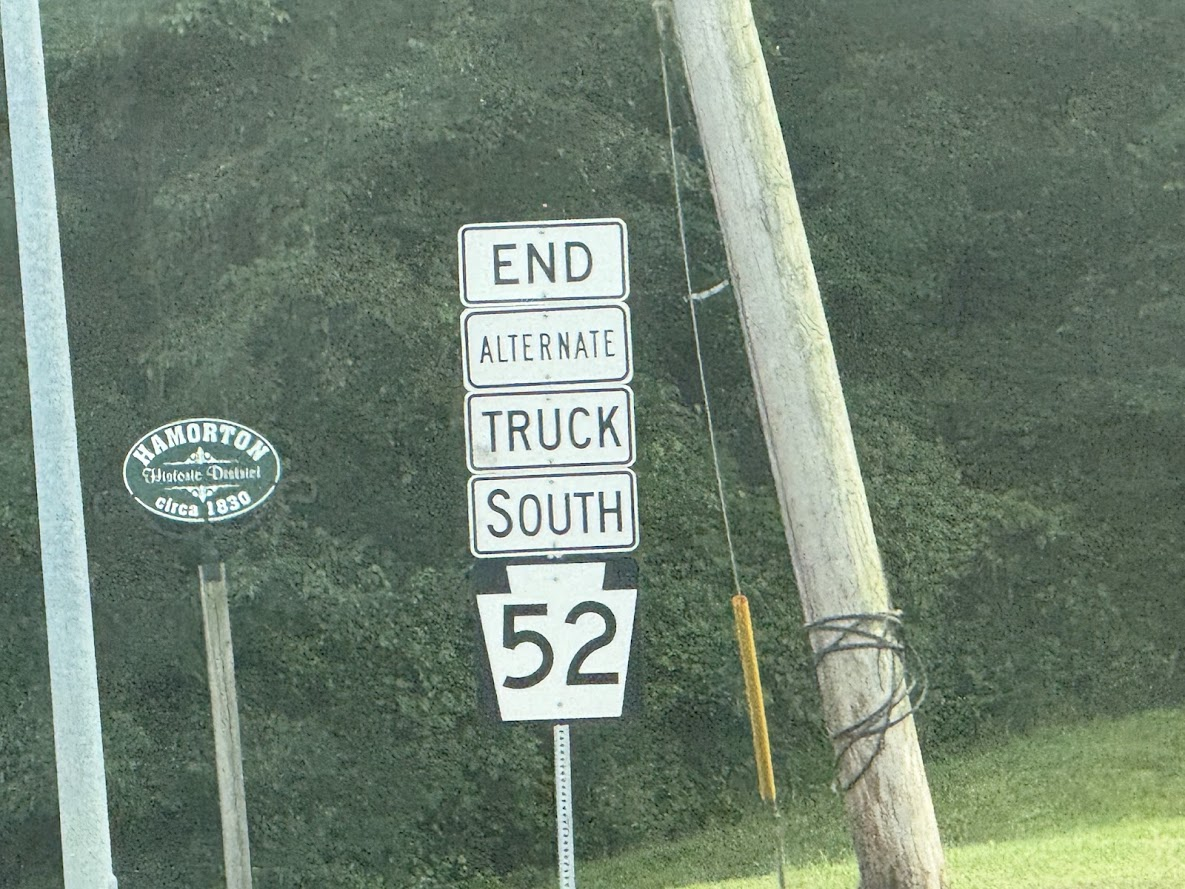
PA 52 Alternate Truck southbound ends at US 1 near Kennett Square.
