= Utah State Route 163 (disambiguation) =

Utah State Route 163 is the state highway designation (legislative overlay) for U.S. Route 163 (US-163) within San Juan County, Utah, United States, that runs through the picturesque Monument Valley and connects U.S. Route 191 in Bluff with Arizona at Oljato-Monument Valley.

Utah State Route 163 may also refer to:

- Utah State Route 163 (1968-1977), a former state highway in southeastern Juab County, Utah, United States, that ran along the former routing of U.S. Route 91 and connected Interstate 15 at Mills Junction, with Utah State Route 28 in Levan (the route was renumbered as Utah State Route 78 in 1977)
- Utah State Route 163 (1933-1966), a former state highway in southern Cache County, Utah, United States, that connected Avon with Utah State Route 101 in Hyrum (the route was renumbered as Utah State Route 126 in 1966)

== See also ==
- List of state highways in Utah
- List of U.S. Highways in Utah
- List of named highway junctions in Utah
- List of highways numbered 163
