= Pocopson Township, Pennsylvania =

Township in Pennsylvania, US

Pocopson Township
- Township
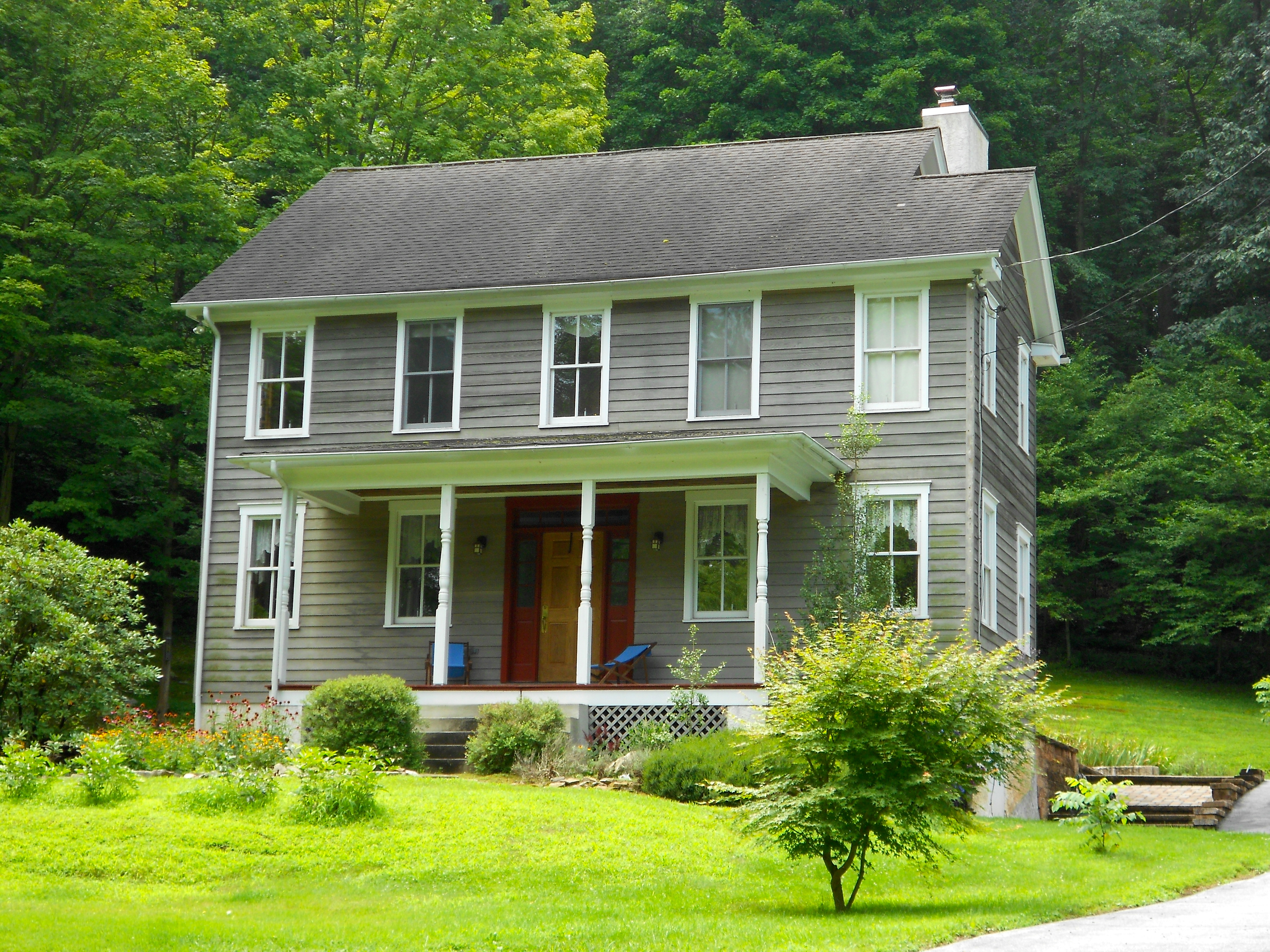
- The Wilkinson House, a historic site in the township

- Location of Pocopson Township in Chester County and of Chester County in Pennsylvania

- Location of Pennsylvania in the United States
- Coordinates: 39°54′27″N 75°40′19″W
- Country: United States
- State: Pennsylvania
- County: Chester

Area
  - Total: 8.32 sq mi (21.56 km^{2})
  - Land: 8.19 sq mi (21.20 km^{2})
  - Water: 0.14 sq mi (0.36 km^{2})
- Elevation: 397 ft (121 m)

Population (2010)
  - Total: 4,582
  - Estimate (2016): 4,842
  - Density: 591.4/sq mi (228.35/km^{2})
- Time zone: UTC-5 (EST)
  - Summer (DST): UTC-4 (EDT)
- Area code: 610
- FIPS code: 42-029-61800
- Website: www.pocopson.org

Pocopson Township is a township in Chester County, Pennsylvania, United States. The population was 4,582 at the 2010 census.

== History ==
There are indications that Pocopson Township was once named Kennet Township, with the change happening before 1900.

The Northbrook Historic District, Trimbleville Historic District, Lenape Bridge, and Wilkinson House are listed on the National Register of Historic Places.

The first settlers were four Indian villages and campsites that were in or near what has now become known as Pocopson Township. Two were located on the Brandywine, one just north of Route 926 and the other northeast of Route 52. A third was near Marshallton and a fourth was just over the line in Newlin Township. These Native Americans were part of a tribe that had occupied this territory for thousands of years. They called themselves "Lenni Lenape" which meant "common people" and they were usually near a river or creek valley.

== Geography ==
According to the United States Census Bureau, the township has a total area of 8.4 square miles (22 km^{2}), of which 8.3 square miles (21 km^{2}) is land and 0.1 square miles (0.26 km^{2}), or 1.43%, is water.

== Demographics ==
Historical population
Census	Pop.	Note	%±
1930	416		—
1940	513		23.3%
1950	475		−7.4%
1960	1,315		176.8%
1970	1,556		18.3%
1980	2,331		49.8%
1990	3,266		40.1%
2000	3,350		2.6%
2010	4,582		36.8%
2020	4,455		−2.8%

At the 2010 census, the township was 81.6% non-Hispanic White, 8.4% Black or African American, 0.3% Native American, 4.3% Asian, 0.1% Native Hawaiian or other Pacific Islander, and 1.6% were two or more races. 4.4% of the population were of Hispanic or Latino ancestry.

At the 2000 census there were 3,350 people in 859 households, including 716 families, in the township. The population density was 404.4 inhabitants per square mile (156.1/km^{2}). There were 890 housing units at an average density of 107.4 per square mile (41.5/km^{2}). The racial makeup of the township was 87.01% White, 11.64% African American, 0.03% Native American, 0.78% Asian, 0.15% Pacific Islander, and 0.39% from two or more races. Hispanic or Latino of any race were 2.09%.

There were 859 households, 36.8% had children under the age of 18 living with them, 75.9% were married couples living together, 5.4% had a female householder with no husband present, and 16.6% were non-families. 13.9% of households were made up of individuals, and 5.7% were one person aged 65 or older. The average household size was 2.80 and the average family size was 3.09.

The age distribution was 19.0% under the age of 18, 8.1% from 18 to 24, 29.7% from 25 to 44, 27.6% from 45 to 64, and 15.4% 65 or older. The median age was 41 years. For every 100 females there were 125.1 males. For every 100 females age 18 and over, there were 132.2 males.

The median household income was $98,215 and the median family income was $105,144. Males had a median income of $77,174 versus $42,500 for females. The per capita income for the township was $51,883. About 1.1% of families and 3.4% of the population were below the poverty line, including 1.1% of those under age 18 and 1.5% of those age 65 or over.

== About Pocopson ==
Pocopson is a mostly rural community, home to (besides residential areas) three restaurants, two parks, two veterinary offices, a career coaching practice, a canoe rental company, a dentist office, a beauty salon, a coffee shop, a florist, a prison and juvenile detention center, a retirement home, a post office, a hardware store, an elementary school, a fencing company and a steelworking hall. In December 2014, the township completed construction on a $2.1 million roundabout on Route 52 at Wawaset Road and Lenape-Unionville Road. The township was home to a giant Penn Oak that died in July 2016. Shortly after the tree's death, one local heaped praise on the fallen resident by stating "It had the courtesy not to hurt anyone or fall onto the road.” There were, however, signs that the majestical tree's health was in decay; mushrooms were growing around its base approximately two years prior to its death. The township is part of the Unionville-Chadds Ford School District.

== Transportation ==
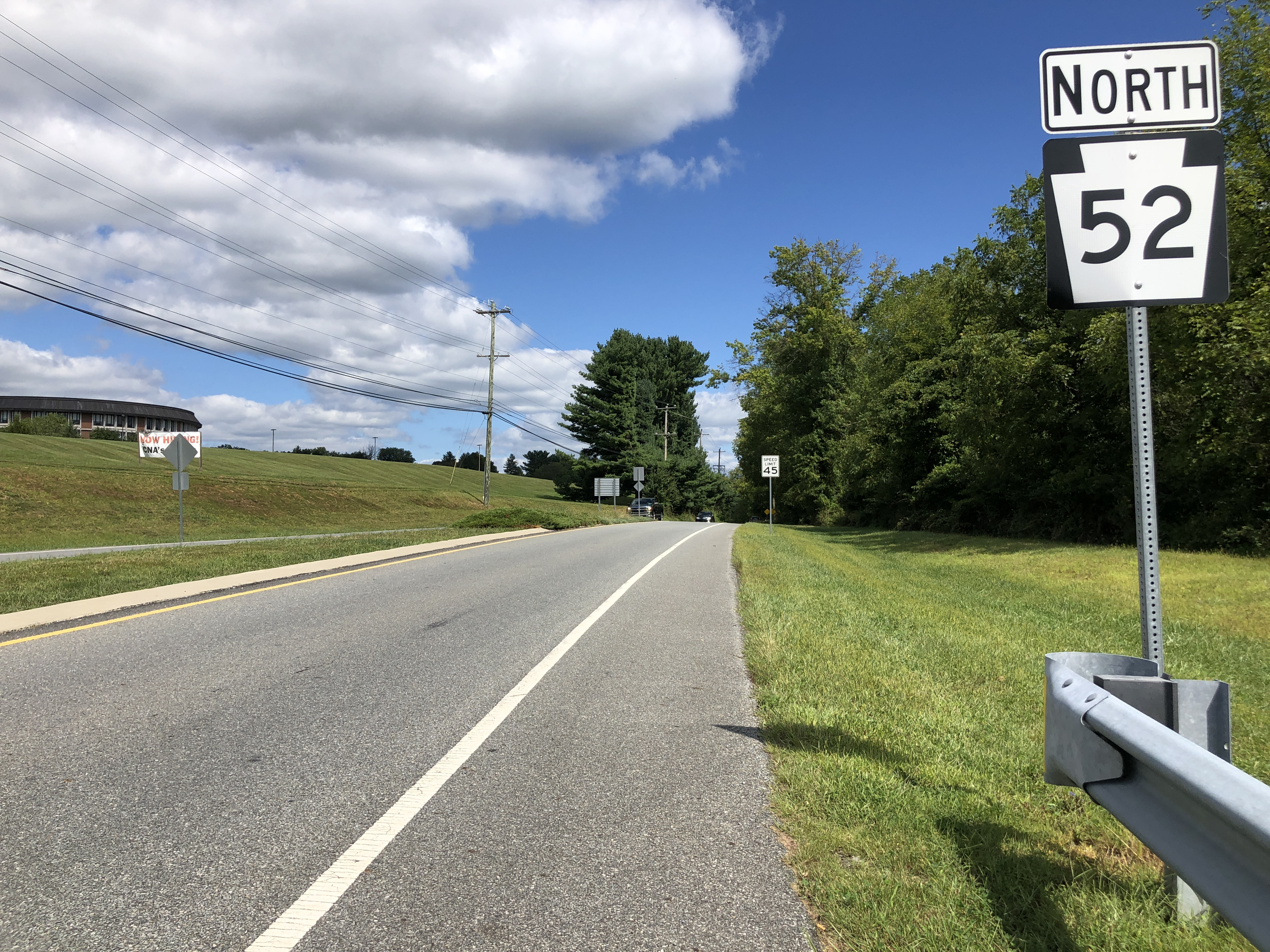
PA 52 northbound in Pocopson Township

As of 2020, there were 43.15 miles (69.44 km) of public roads in Pocopson Township, of which 13.04 miles (20.99 km) were maintained by the Pennsylvania Department of Transportation (PennDOT) and 30.11 miles (48.46 km) were maintained by the township.

Pennsylvania Route 52, Pennsylvania Route 842 and Pennsylvania Route 926 are the numbered highways serving Pocopson Township. PA 52 follows Lenape Road along a southwest–northeast alignment through the southeastern portion of the township. PA 842 follows Unionville Wawaset road along a southwest–northeast alignment through the northwestern part of the township. Finally, PA 926 follows Street Road along a southwest–northeast alignment through the southeastern corner of the township.

== Government and infrastructure ==
The township houses Chester County Prison.

== Education ==
The school district is Unionville-Chadds Ford School District.

== Notable people ==
- Eusebius Barnard, Quaker minister and station master on the Underground Railroad
- Bam Margera, member of MTV's Jackass crew
