= Great Minquas Path =

Historic trade route in the United States

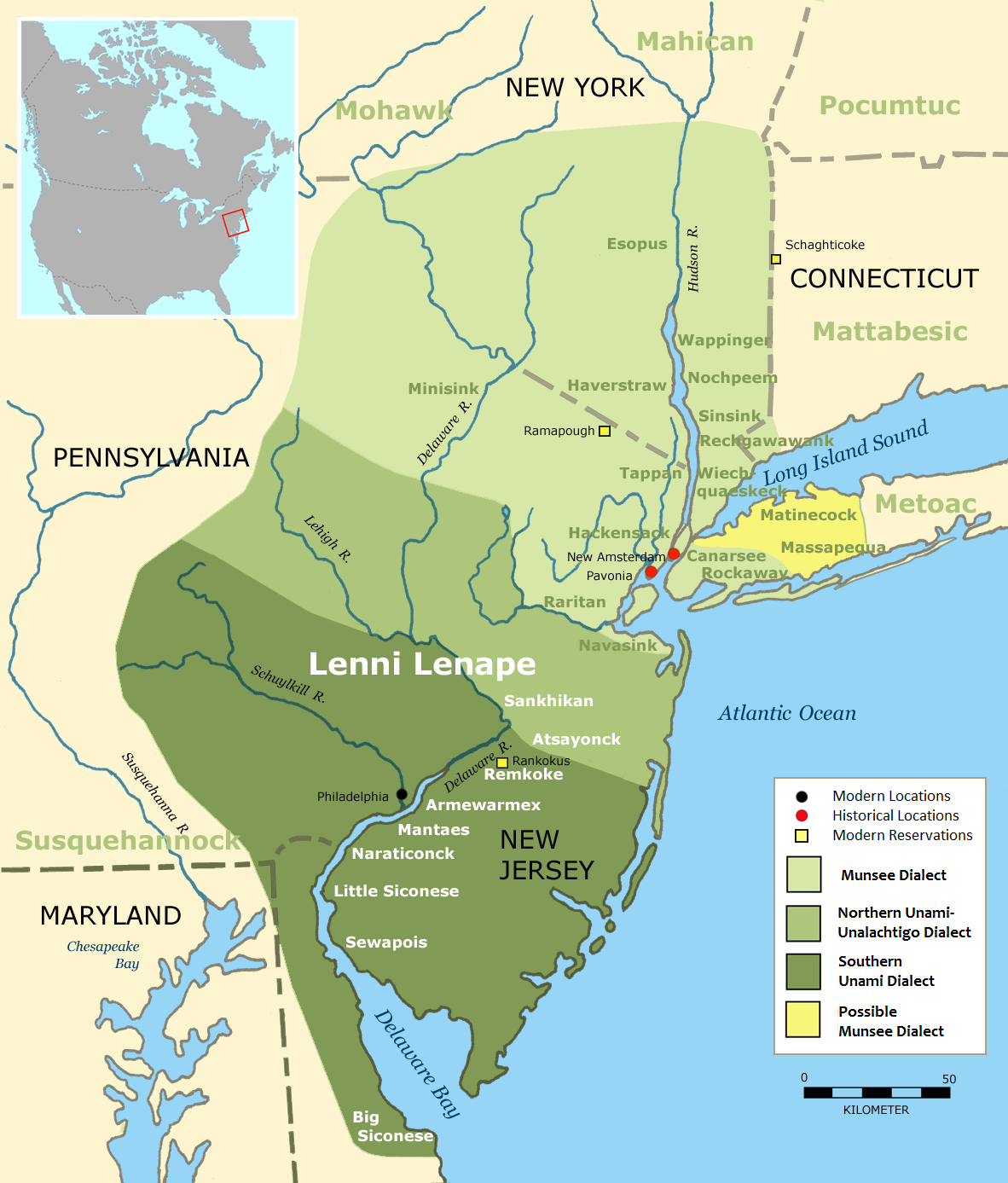
Great Minquas Path, which went from the Susquehanna River (far left) to present-day Philadelphia, on the Schuylkill River

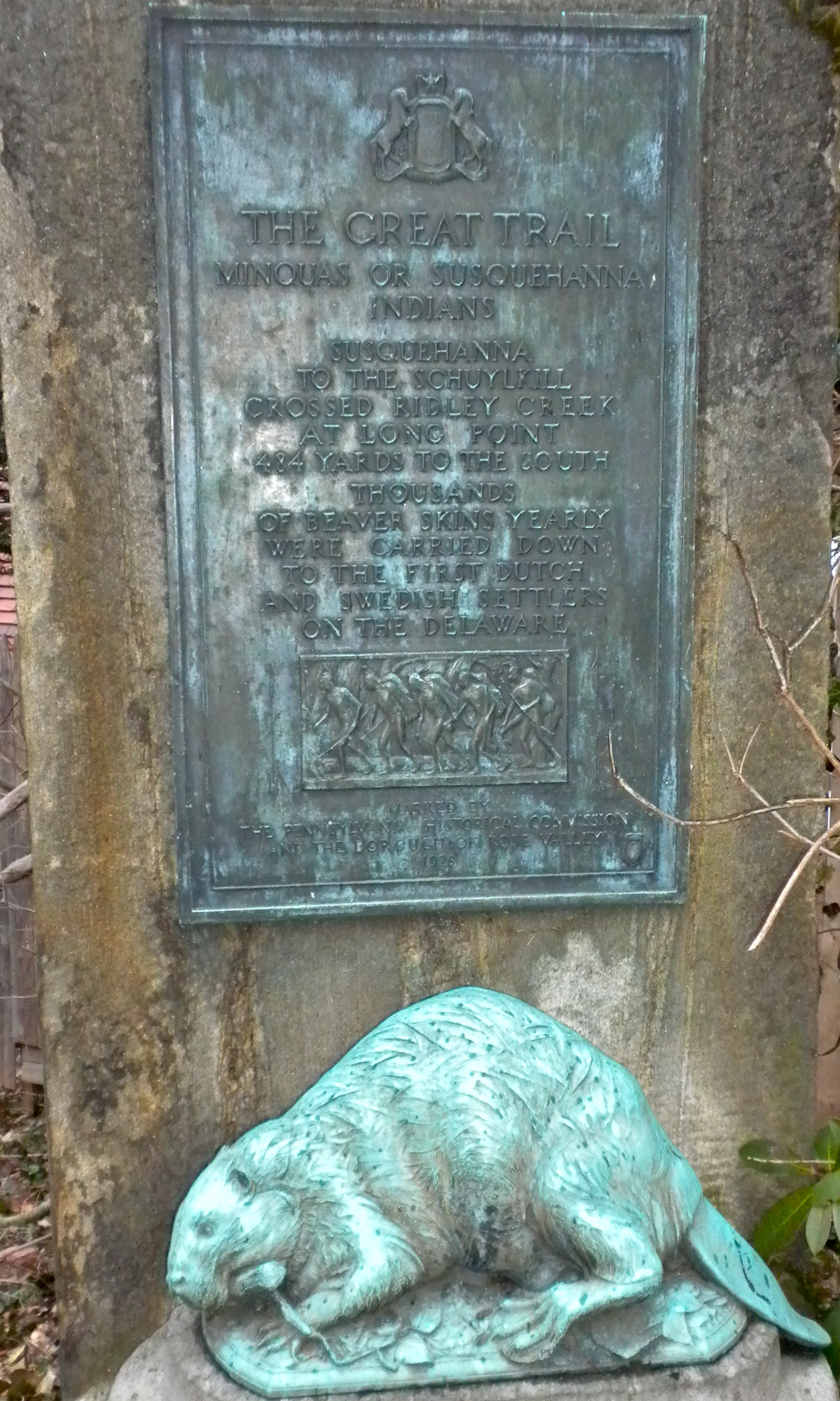
The Great Trail, a 1926 Pennsylvania State Historical Marker in Rose Valley, Pennsylvania, including a beaver sculpture by Albert Laessle

Great Minquas Path, or The Great Trail, was a 17th-century trade route that ran through southeastern Pennsylvania from the Susquehanna River, near Conestoga, to the Schuylkill River, opposite Philadelphia. The 80-mile (130 km) east-west trail was the primary route for fur trading with the Minquas (or Susquehannock) people. Dutch, Swedish and English settlers fought one another for control of it. A 1688/1689 survey prepared by Benjamin Chambers for William Penn depicts a Native American footpath extending from the Susquehanna River to the west side of Ridley Creek, in present-day Delaware County, in or near Rose Valley. The survey does not identify the path by name or show its continuation eastward through Delaware County.

== Dutch ==
The Dutch began the fur trade in the 1620s, and named the trail "Beversreede" or "Beaver Road." Sometime after 1633, they built Fort Beversreede at the trail's eastern terminus, the confluence of the Schuylkill River and the Delaware River. A 1655 Swedish map shows the fort on Providence Island, on the west bank of the Schuylkill River, at its mouth, although Scharf and Westcott state that the fort was on the east bank of the Schuylkill River.

In 1634, the Susquehannock used the Great Minquas Path in their conquest of the Lenape people. "Minquas," meaning "treacherous," was the Lenni-Lenape name for the Susquehannock, their traditional enemy. The name was adopted by the Dutch, and later the Swedes.

== Swedes ==
The Swedish colony, New Sweden, was founded in 1638, about 20 miles (32.5 km) south of Fort Beversreede, in what is now Wilmington, Delaware. In 1644, Governor Johan Björnsson Printz built Fort Nya Vasa where the Great Minquas Path crossed Cobbs Creek. This attempt to siphon off Native American trade from the Dutch was unsuccessful. Printz tried again at Fort Beversreede itself. In 1648, the Swedes built a blockhouse directly in front of the Dutch fort, rendering it useless for defense. The Dutch abandoned the fort in 1651.

Under Peter Stuyvesant, the Dutch returned and conquered "New Sweden" in 1655, renaming the colony "New Netherlands."

== English ==
The English in turn conquered the Dutch in 1664, and the tiny colony became part of the 1681 land grant to William Penn. The English called the Susquehannock "Conestogas," after their main settlement on the Susquehanna River. The Susquehannock were decimated by smallpox, and by long conflicts with European settlers in the Chesapeake Bay region, 1642–52, and the Iroquois to the north, 1658–62. Many of them moved or intermarried with other tribes. A century later, in December 1763, the Paxton Boys massacred 20 of the Conestogas, and the tribe soon became extinct in Pennsylvania.

Strasburg Road in Chester County and Lancaster County generally follows the route of the Great Minquas Path. The trail is marked by Pennsylvania State historical markers in Philadelphia, Delaware, Chester, and Lancaster Counties.
