= Strasburg Road =

Historic road in the United States

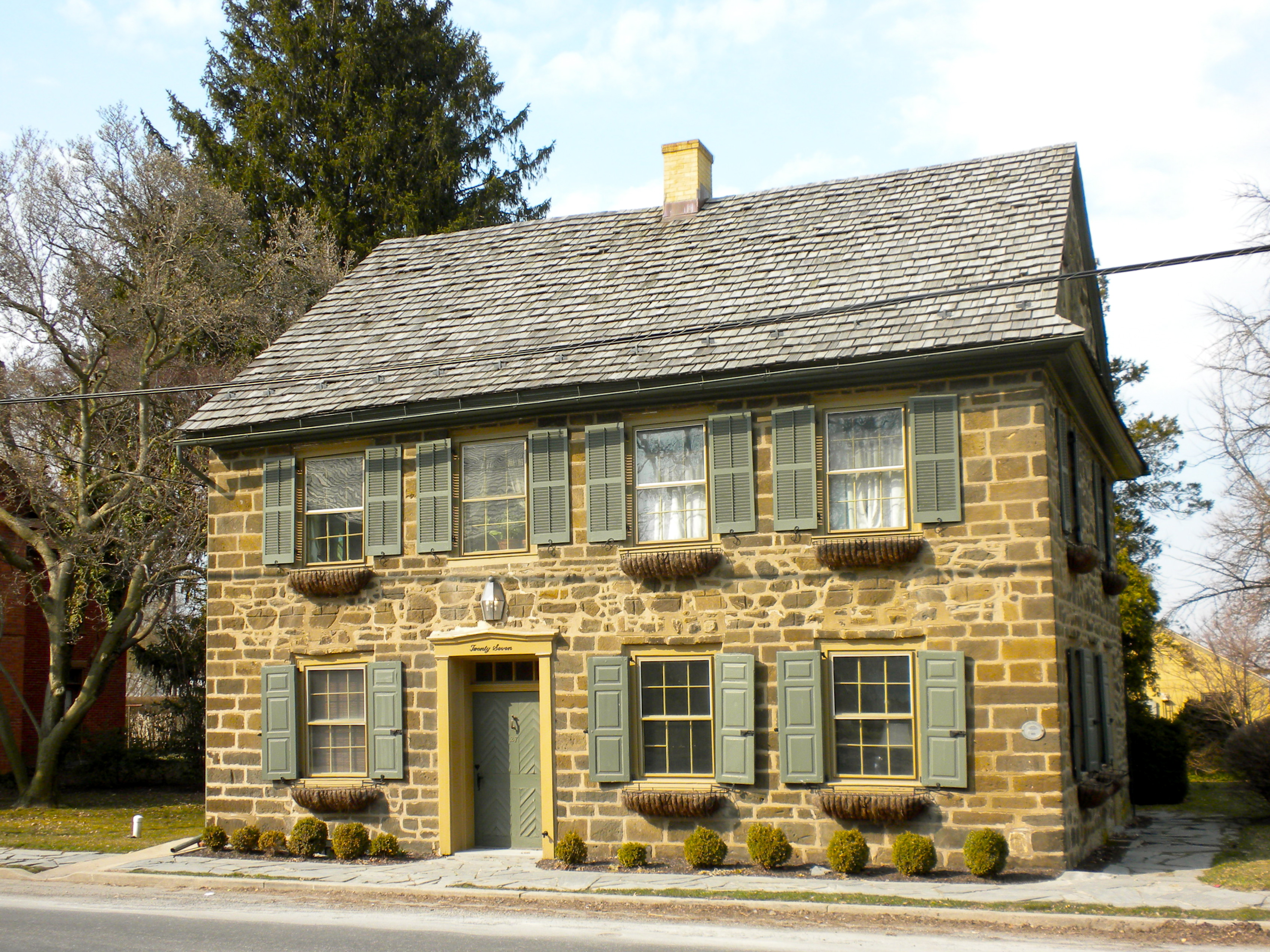
House built in 1754 on Strasburg Road in Strasburg, Pennsylvania

Strasburg Road was an early road in Pennsylvania connecting Philadelphia to Strasburg in Lancaster County. The route was surveyed by John Sellers and others in 1772–73 under the colonial administration of Governor Richard Penn and completed under the new administration of the independent state of Pennsylvania. The route started at the "second ferry" on the Schuylkill River, today's Market Street in Philadelphia, and went through West Chester, East Fallowfield Township, and Gap, before ending in Strasburg. Earlier roads travelled much the same route, including a Native American path in use as early as 1620.

== Earlier routes ==
A road following much of the same route had existed at least since the 1750s, but the area around the road only began to develop as the state constructed, or re-constructed, the road in the 1790s.

The use of wagons on this road began as early as 1714 as it developed out of the earlier Great Minquas Path. Wagons on this road were the first to be called Conestoga wagons.

A Native American path, known as the Great Minquas Path went through much of the same area as early as 1620. Confusingly, there were several branches of this path, and it and some other early roads are also called the Conestoga Path or Conestoga Road. From the Susquehannock village near the confluence of the Susquehanna and Conestoga Rivers the path travelled east to European traders and early settlers on the Delaware River. The path went east from the Conestoga to the area of the present day town of Willow Street, then Strasburg, and Gap, then entered present day Chester County. There it continued east via Atglen, Parkesburg, Mortonville, and West Chester, crossed into Delaware County and there led through Lima and Rose Valley, where it could go south to Chester or east to Darby, and finally to Philadelphia. Parts of Pennsylvania Route 741 follow the path in Lancaster County, and parts of Pennsylvania Route 162 follow the path in Chester County. These modern roads are generally named "Strasburg Road" and are connected by smaller roads carrying street signs of "Strasburg Road" or "West Strasburg Road."

East of West Chester, the Minquas Path travelled well south of Pennsylvania Route 3, the West Chester Pike, which today carries traffic between Market Street in Philadelphia and Market Street in West Chester. The name Strasburg Road is not used today east of West Chester except for a short stretch of road which branches off of the West Chester Pike going east, named "Strasburg Road". After about a mile, this road becomes Goshen Road, which goes east to Darby Paoli Road, in Radnor Township, Delaware County, Pennsylvania.

== Historic buildings ==
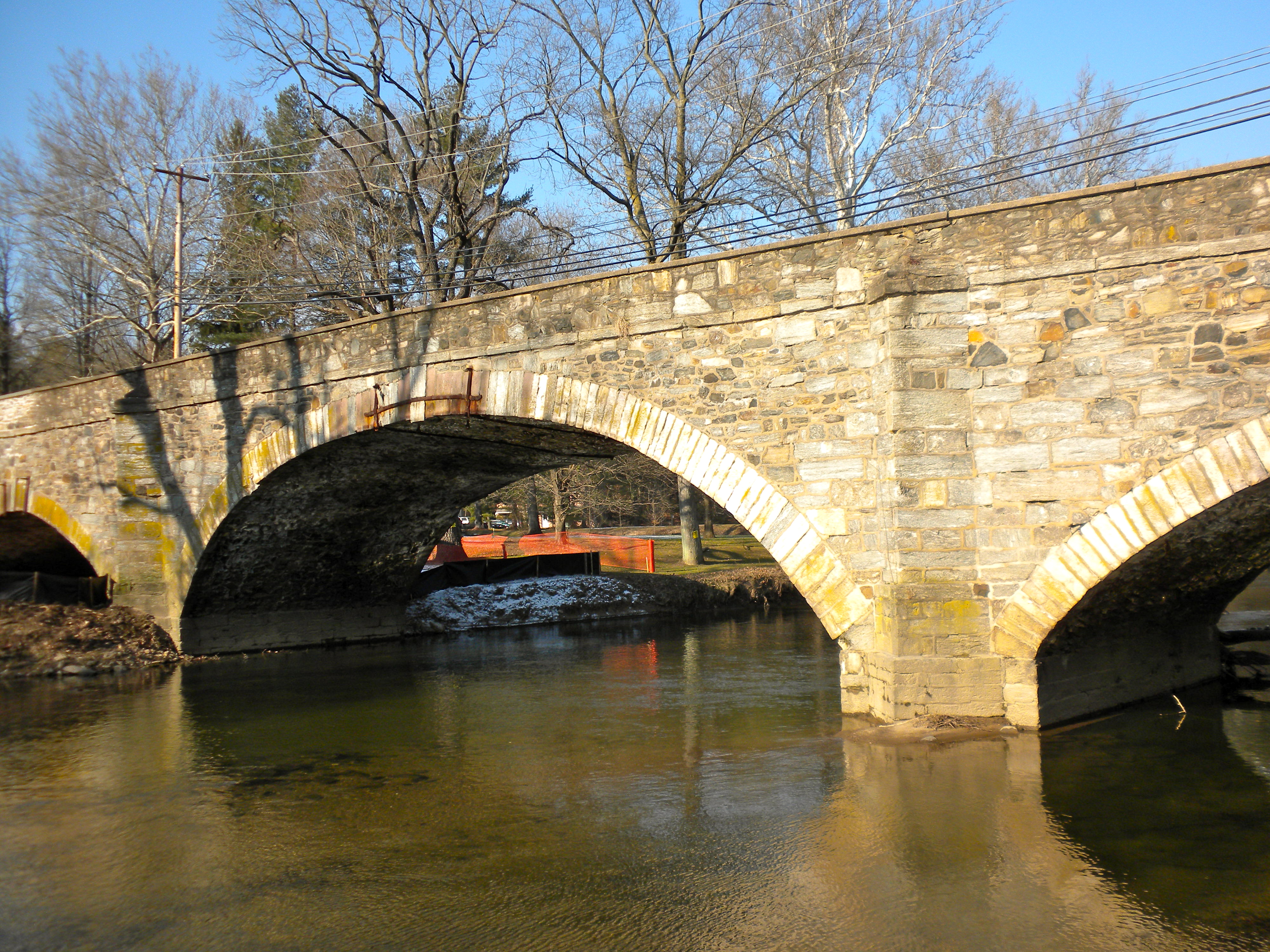
Cope's Bridge, built 1828

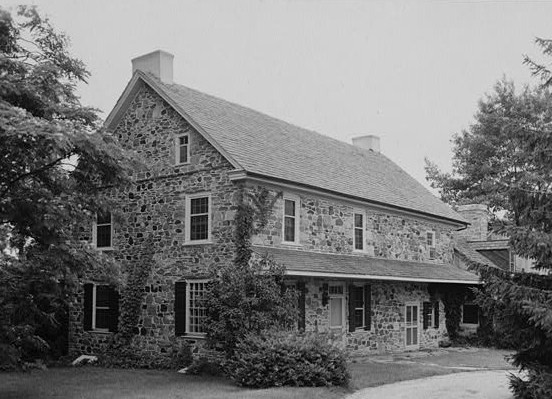
Humphrey Marshall House, a National Historic Landmark

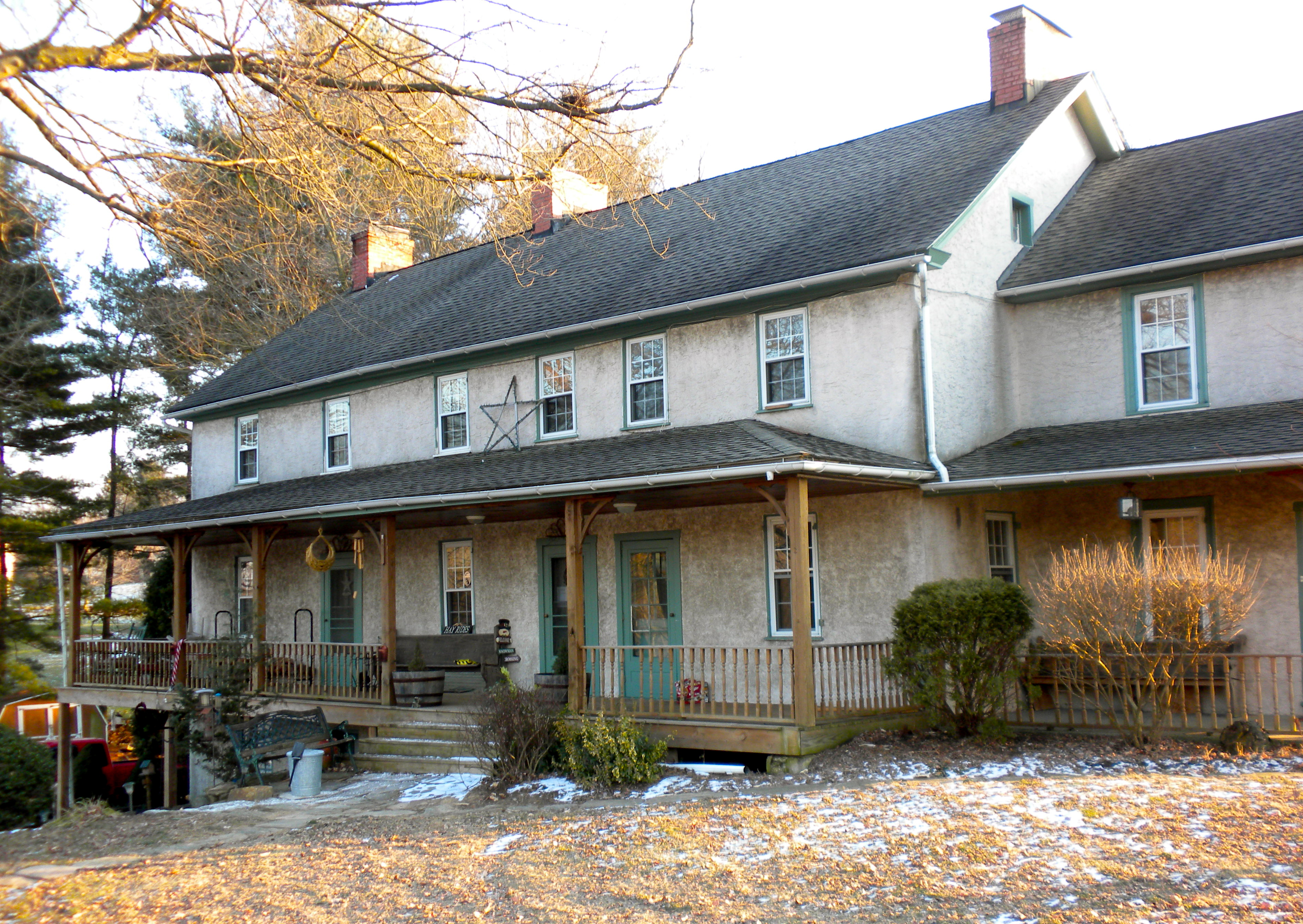
Drovers Inn in East Fallowfield Township

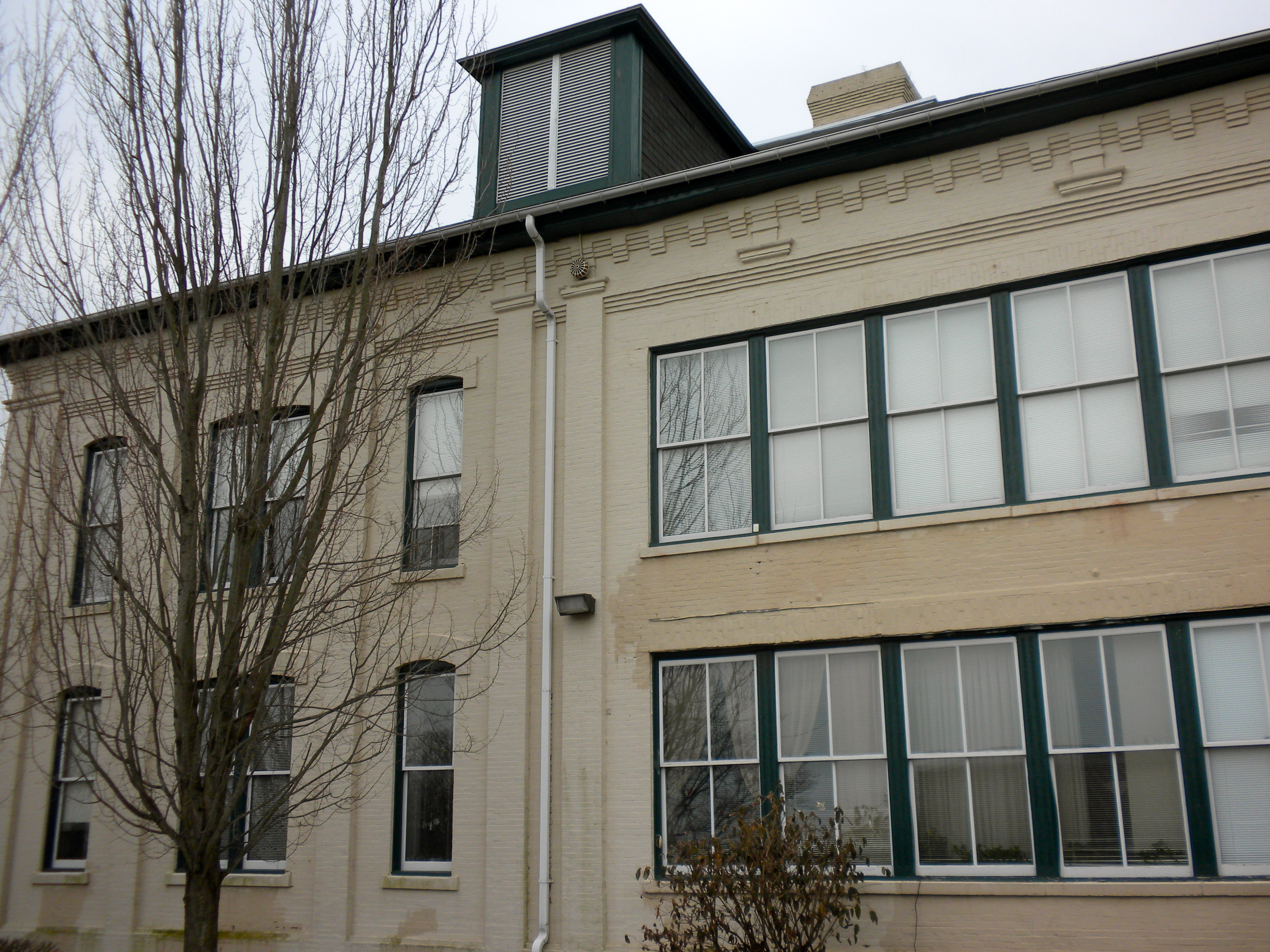
Parkesburg School

Due to the commercial use of Strasburg Road during the Colonial and Early Federal periods, at least twenty-three buildings or historic districts along the road have been listed on the National Register of Historic Places in Chester County. From east to west, these are:

- West Chester Downtown Historic District 39°57′37″N 75°36′20″W includes Market Street, with a dozen individually listed buildings nearby
- Taylor-Cope Historic District 39°57′32″N 75°38′50″W
- Cope's Bridge 39°57′31.9″N 75°39′19.3″W
- Taylor House 39°57′27″N 75°39′40″W
- Marshallton Historic District 39°57′0″N 75°40′35″W
- Marshallton Inn 39°57′1″N 75°40′43″W
- Humphry Marshall House 39°57′2″N 75°40′54″W
- Baily Farm 39°56′55″N 75°42′11″W
- Mortonville Hotel 39°56′49″N 75°46′41″W
- Bridge in East Fallowfield Township 39°56′46″N 75°46′43″W
- Mortonville Bridge 39°56′47″N 75°46′47″W
- Rev. Joshua Vaughan House 39°57′3″N 75°48′54″W
- White Horse Tavern 39°57′2″N 75°49′11″W
- Robert Young House 39°57′2″N 75°49′13″W
- Drovers Inn 39°57′14″N 75°50′18″W
- Robert Wilson House 39°57′9″N 75°50′32″W
- Isaac Pawling House 39°57′21″N 75°50′55″W
- Harry DeHaven House 39°57′18″N 75°50′56″W
- Asa Walton House 39°57′20″N 75°51′16″W
- Philip Dougherty Tavern 39°57′40″N 75°51′42″W
- Philip Dougherty House 39°57′32″N 75°52′20″W
- Parkesburg National Bank 39°57′35″N 75°55′22″W
- Parkesburg School 39°57′40″N 75°55′14″W

In Lancaster County

- the Railroad Museum of Pennsylvania 39°58′56″N 76°9′40″W, which contains 25 NRHP listed locomotives and train cars, and
- Strasburg Historic District 39°58′51″N 76°11′15″W

are located on Strasburg Road.
