= Lakes-to-Sea Highway =

The Lakes-to-Sea Highway, also known as the "Ship-to-Shore" highway, was an auto trail in the Northeastern United States, running from Erie, Pennsylvania on Lake Erie southeast via Harrisburg and Philadelphia to Atlantic City, New Jersey on the Atlantic Ocean.

The highway roughly followed the following present routes:

- U.S. Route 19, Erie to Meadville
- U.S. Route 322, Meadville to West Chester
- Pennsylvania Route 3, West Chester to Philadelphia
- U.S. Route 30, Philadelphia to Atlantic City

It ran along the William Penn Highway between Water Street and Hershey.
